= List of aces of aces =

List of leading military aces

Ace of aces is a title accorded to the top active ace within a branch of service in a nation's military in time of war. The term ace is used for a highly successful military professional that has been accredited with: multiple enemy aircraft shot down, tanks destroyed, or ships sunk; by number or tonnage. The term was widely used for propaganda purposes during World War I, and mainly applied to a pilot who was credited with shooting down five enemy aircraft. The title is most closely associated with fighter aces, though there are other types, such as tank aces and submarine aces.

== Flying aces ==
Ace of aces is a title accorded to the top flying ace of a nation's air force during time of war.

=== World War I ===
The concept of aces emerged in 1915 during World War I.

This with the * indicates that the pilot was either killed in action or killed in a training event during the war.

Person	Country	WWI years active	Overall years active	Aerial victories	Plane flown	Notes
René Fonck	(France) French Third Republic	May 1915 – 1 November 1918	1914–1918 1937–1940	75	Caudron G III, SPAD VII, SPAD XII and SPAD XIII	All-time Allied ace of aces, with 75 confirmed aerial victories.
Manfred von Richthofen	German Empire	17 September 1916 – 21 April 1918	1911–1918	80	Albatros D.V, Fokker Dr.I and others	Ace of Aces, the highest score in World War I. Richthofen, also called "The Red Baron", achieved 80 air combat victories. Shot down on 21 April 1918. Available evidence suggests that he was most likely killed by Australian Sergeant Cedric Popkin.
Billy Bishop	Canada	April 1917 – end of World War I	1914–1918; 1936–1944	72	Nieuport 17	Credited with 72 victories, making him the top Canadian and British Empire ace of the war. In 1917 he became the highest scoring ace in the RFC and the third top ace of the war, behind only the Red Baron and René Fonck.
Francesco Baracca	Kingdom of Italy	May 1915 – 19 June 1918	1907 – 1918	34	Nieuport 11,Nieuport 17, SPAD VII,SPAD XIII	Italian ace of World War I. His Prancing Horse emblem was adopted as logo of Italian carmaker Ferrari in his honor. Shot down during a strafing mission on the Montello (hill) area on 19 June 1918.
Eddie Rickenbacker	United States	29 September 1918 – end of World War I	1917–1919	26	Nieuport 17, SPAD S.XIII	American Ace of Aces, 26 aerial victories.
Indra Lal Roy	(British Raj) British India	1917–22 July 1918	1917–1918	10	S.E.5	India's most successful fighter pilot, with 10 kills. Killed during a dogfight with German aircraft

=== World War II ===
World War II had more aces than any other war.

Person	Country	WWII years active	Overall years active	Aerial victories	Plane flown	Notes
Erich Hartmann	Nazi Germany	19 September 1942 – 8 May 1945	1940–1945 1956–1970	352	Bf 109	Hartmann is the highest scoring ace of all time, with 352 aerial victories, the first pilot to achieve 300 aerial victories (on 24 August 1944) and 350 aerial victories (on 17 April 1945)
Kurt Welter	Nazi Germany	1939 – 1945	1934–1945	20 (Note: According to Hinchliffe, Kurt Welter is credited in excess of 20 aerial victories while flying the Me 262, but the exact number is disputed.)	Me 262	All-time leading jet ace during World War II.
Ilmari Juutilainen	Finland	1939–1944	1932–1947	94	Fokker D.XXI, Brewster Buffalo and Bf 109	The top scoring Ilmavoimat (Finnish Air Force), and the top scoring non-German fighter pilot of all time. The top flying ace of the Finnish Air Force with 94 confirmed aerial combat victories
Teresio Vittorio Martinoli	Italy	1940–1944	1938–1944	22	CR.42, C.202	22 air victories, 21 on Allied aircraft and 1 on German aircraft after Italian Armistice of Cassibile. Killed in an accident flying on behalf of the Italian Co-belligerent Air Force.
Constantin Cantacuzino	Romania	1941–1945	1941–1945	69	Hurricane and Bf 109	69 victories by Romanian standards, of which 7 against the Axis after the 1944 coup. Top scoring Romanian ace. Flew as a commercial pilot before and after the war.
Pat Pattle	United Kingdom	4 August 1940– 20 April 1941	1936–1941	50	Hurricanes and Gladiators	Credited with 51 victories, making him the most successful South African Ace of the Second World War. Killed in a dogfight with a German Bf 110.
George 'Buzz' Beurling	Canada	1940–1944	1940–1944, 1948	31	Spitfire and P-51 Mustangs	Credited with 31 confirmed victories, making him the most successful Canadian ace of the Second World War.
Richard Bong	United States	19 January 1942 – 6 August 1945	1941–1945	40	P-38 Lightning and P-80 Shooting Star	Top US flying ace of the war, credited with 40 confirmed downed Japanese aircraft. Awarded the Medal of Honor. Killed in a flying accident before the war's end.
Ivan Kozhedub	Soviet Union	6 July 1943 – 17 April 1945	1940–1985	64	La-5 and La-7	Credited with 64 victories, Kozhedub is the top scoring Allied ace of World War II. One of the few pilots to shoot down a Messerschmitt Me 262.

=== Post-World War II era ===
Person	Country	Wars	Years active	Aerial victories	Plane flown	Notes
Nikolai Sutyagin	Soviet Union	Korean War	1941–1978	22	Mig-15	The 'Ace of Aces' in the Korean War, with the highest number of kills for any pilot. Officially the highest scoring jet ace in history. Awarded Hero of the Soviet Union.
Joseph C. McConnell	United States	Korean War	1940–1954	16	F-86 Sabre	First US Jet ace, also top scoring American ace.
Fan Wanzhang	China	Korean War	?–1952	8	Mig-15	Also known as Fan Van Chou. Killed in action on 8 August 1952. Highest scoring People's Liberation Army Air Force Ace.
Muhammad Mahmood Alam	Pakistan	Indo-Pakistani War of 1965	1953–1982	9	F-86 Sabre	Muhammad Mahmood Alam is credited with having shot down five Indian aircraft in less than a minute, the last four within 30 seconds. He is the only jet pilot who has achieved Ace in a day.
Giora Even Epstein	Israel	Six-Day War; War of Attrition; Yom Kippur War	1956–1997	17	Mirage III, Mirage 5, Kfir and F-16	Credited with 17 victories, 16 against Egyptian jets, making Epstein the ace of aces of supersonic fighter jets and of the Israeli Air Force.
Saiful Azam	Pakistan Bangladesh	Indo-Pakistani War of 1965, Six-Day War	1960–1980	5	F-86 Sabre, Hawker Hunter	He holds the world record for shooting down the highest number of Israeli aircraft (4) in aerial combat. He is also the only pilot to have served in four different air forces (PAF, RJAF, IrAF and BAF).
Nguyễn Văn Cốc	Democratic Republic of Vietnam	Vietnam War	1961–2002	7–9	MiG-17 and MiG-21	From seven to nine victories on US-crewed aircraft, as well as two drones.
Vadim Shcherbakov	Soviet Union	Vietnam War	1966–1967	6	MiG-21	Per US sources.
Randy H. Cunningham	United States	Vietnam War	1967–1987	5	F-4 Phantom II	First American ace of the Vietnam War.
Legesse Tefera	Ethiopia	Ogaden War		7	Northrop F-5	Ethiopia's most successful pilot, and the most successful Northrop F-5 pilot, with six or seven kills.
Jalil Zandi	Iran	Iran–Iraq War	1970–2001	8–11	F-14 Tomcat	Iran's most successful fighter pilot ever, with eight confirmed aerial victories. The most successful F-14 Tomcat pilot.
Mohommed "Sky Falcon" Rayyan	Iraq	Iran–Iraq War	1977–1986	5	MiG-21 and MiG-25	Iraq's most successful fighter pilot ever, with five confirmed aerial victories. The most successful MiG-25 pilot. Shot down in July 1986.

== Submarine aces ==
Top subsea ace/undersea ace/submarine ace of a nation's submarine force during time of war.

Persons accorded the title ace of aces
Person	Country	War	Period	Notes
Lothar von Arnauld de la Perière	(German Empire) Imperial Germany	World War I	1915–18	The commander of U-35, Arnauld de la Perière sank a total of 194 merchant vessels and gunboats totaling 453,716 gross metric tons.
Georg von Trapp	(Austria-Hungary) Austro Hungary	World War I	1915–18	Most successful Austro-Hungarian Empire submarine commander with 13 enemy ships sunk including two warships.
Wolfgang Lüth	Nazi Germany	World War II	1933–1945	46 enemy merchant ships sunk and plus French Submarine. Total GRT sunk of 225,204.
Otto Kretschmer	Nazi Germany	World War II	1939–1941	46 or 47 enemy ships sunk with 274,418 GRT. The most successful German Submarine ace in GRT sunk.
Dick O'Kane	United States	World War II	July 1943 – 25 October 1944	31 Japanese merchant ship sunk. Captured and made Prisoner of war.
Malcolm David Wanklyn	United Kingdom	World War II	February 1940 – 14 April 1942	16 enemy ships sunk. Wanklyn was the British Ace of Aces in terms of tonnage, disappeared during 28th patrol on board HMS Upholder.
Gianfranco Gazzana-Priaroggia	(Kingdom of Italy) Italy	World War II		The highest scoring Italian submarine commander, with 11 ships sunk for a total of 90,601 tons.
Carlo Fecia di Cossato	(Kingdom of Italy) Italy	World War II		With 16 sinkings, he is credited with the most kills in the Regia Marina, as well as the second most successful Italian submarine commander with 86,545 tons.

== Submarine hunters ==
Persons accorded the title ace of aces
Person	Country	War	Period	Notes
John Walker	United Kingdom	World War II	1909–1944	Walker sank more U-boats (12 confirmed) during the Battle of the Atlantic than any other British or Allied commander. Died 9 July 1944 by cerebral thrombosis.

== Tank aces ==
A "tank ace" or Panzer ace has been described by Historian Robert Kershaw as being the minority of tank commanders that accounted for the most destroyed enemy armor, saying it is roughly analogous with a flying ace.

Person	Country	War	Period	Tanks destroyed	Tank type crewed	Notes
Edmund Roman Orlik	Poland	Invasion of Poland	1 September 1939 – 28 September 1939	10 (official)	TKS (20mm variant)	Polish "tank ace of aces". During the Invasion of Poland by Nazi Germany in September 1939 he claimed to have destroyed ten German tanks, including one Panzer IV Ausf. B, the largest tank then fielded by Germany, with a 2.6 tonne TKS tankette armed with a 20mm autocannon. The unofficial claim is that he destroyed 13 tanks, although this has not been confirmed by any trustworthy sources to date.
Ervin Tarczay	Hungary	World War II	January 1943 – 18 March 1945	10	41M Turán II, Tiger I, Panther and Panzer IV Ausf. H	10 confirmed and 15 unconfirmed tank kills during World War II. On 15 March 1945, he was knighted and took medical leave. He returned to service quickly and was officially declared missing in action on 18 March 1945, after having been left behind while wounded in Söréd.
Kurt Knispel	Nazi Germany	World War II	1940 – 28 April 1945	168	Tiger I and Tiger II	168 confirmed and 195 unconfirmed tank kills. He fought in nearly every type of German tank, working as a loader, gunner, or commander. He is credited with destroying a T-34 tank from 3,000 meters.
Otto Carius	Nazi Germany	World War II	1940 – 7 May 1945	150	Tiger I, various others	Credited with over 150 tank kills and 1 aircraft shot down, mostly in various Tiger tanks.
Johannes Bölter	Nazi Germany	World War II	1940 – 28 April 1945	139	Tiger I	Destroyed 139 enemy tanks, including 16 tanks in one action. Referenced in Wolfgang Schneider's "Tigers in Combat, Volume 1"
Michael Wittmann	Nazi Germany	World War II	1941 – 8 August 1944	138	Tiger I and Sturmgeschütz III	Credited with over 138 tank kills
Walter Kniep	Nazi Germany	World War II	5 July 1943 to 17 January 1944	129	Stug	Awarded the Iron cross, commander of the assault gun battalion of SS-Das Reich
Paul Egger	Nazi Germany	World War II	1941 – 3 May 1945	113	Tiger I	SS Oberscharfuehrer Credited with 113 tank kills
Fritz Lang	Nazi Germany	World War II	1941 – ????	111	Stug III	Germany's WW2 top assault gun ace.
Albert Kerscher	Nazi Germany	World War II	???? – 19 April 1945	100	Tiger I	Feldwebel Albert Kerscher, a member of Schwere Panzer Abteilung 502. Credited with 100 tanks destroyed
Dmitry Lavrinenko	(Soviet Union) USSR	World War II	1941	52	T-34	Dmitry Fyodorovich Lavrinenko was a Soviet tank commander and Hero of the Soviet Union. He was the highest scoring tank ace of the Allies during World War II. Lavrinenko destroyed 52 tanks in just 2.5 months of fierce fighting in 1941.
Alfred Nickolls	United Kingdom	World War II	1940 – 1943	30	M4 Sherman	According to 22 November 1942 citation, Corporal Nickolls, in a Sherman tank at El Alemain destroyed 14 tanks, including destroying 9 German tanks in one single engagement. He destroyed 30 tank during the entire North Africa campaign, making him the top tank ace of the United Kingdom and the top tank ace of the western Allies during World War II Awarded the Military Medal by Field Marshall Bernard Montgomery
Zinovy Grigoryevich Kolobanov	(Soviet Union) USSR	World War II	1941	25	KV-1	During an ambush on German units on 20 August 1941 as part of the battle for Leningrad, region of Voyskovitski, his KV-1 destroyed 22 tanks and 2 artillery pieces before running out of ammunition. His unit of 5 KV-1Es destroyed a total of 43 German tanks that day.
Sydney Valpy Radley-Walters	Canada	World War II	October 1942 - end of World War II	18	M4 Sherman	Credited with 18 tank kills and many other armoured vehicles, whilst in command of three Sherman tanks, named 'Caribou'. The tank squadron under his command may have been responsible for the death of German tank ace Michael Wittmann.
Lafayette G. Pool	United States	World War II	27 June 1944 – 15 September 1944	12	M4 Sherman	Widely recognised as the American tank ace of aces, with 12 confirmed tank kills and 258 armoured vehicle kills, whilst in command of a Sherman tank.
Börje Bror Brotell	Finland	World War II	1943 – 1944	11	Sturmgeschütz III	Recognised as the Finnish tank ace of aces, with 11 confirmed and 4 unconfirmed tank kills during World War II. Brotell's role during The Battle of Tali–Ihantala was decisive and his Sturmgeschütz III destroyed multiple enemy tanks which had achieved a breakthrough.
Arun Khetarpal	India	Indo-Pakistani War of 1971 Battle of Basantar	9 December 1971 - 16 December 1971	10	Centurion	Indian tank ace. Personally responsible for destroying 10 tanks before he was killed in action in Battle of Basantar
Zvika Greengold	Israel	Yom Kippur War	6 October 1973 – 25 October 1973	60	Centurion (more specifically Sho't)	In total 60 tanks were accredited to him. Greengold himself claims 20 Syrian tanks over the space of holding his position for 20 hours. He changed tanks six times.

== See also ==
- Ace (military)

== General and cited references ==
=== World War I sources ===
- Franks, Norman; Bailey, Frank (2008). Over the Front: The Complete Record of the Fighter Aces and Units of the United States and French Air Services, 1914–1918. London, UK: Grub Street Publishing. ISBN 978-0-948817-54-0.
- Franks, Norman; Bailey, Frank; Guest, Russell (2008). Above the Lines: A Complete Record of the Aces and Fighter Units of the German Air Service, Naval Air Service and Flanders Marine Corps 1914–1918. London, UK: Grub Street Publishing. ISBN 978-0-948817-73-1.
- Shores, Christopher F.; Franks, Norman; Guest, Russell F. (1990). Above the Trenches: a Complete Record of the Fighter Aces and Units of the British Empire Air Forces 1915–1920. London, UK: Grub Street. ISBN 978-0-948817-19-9.

=== Later wars ===
- Aces of WWII
- Bagdonas, Raymond (2014). The Devil's General: The Life of Hyazinth Graf Strachwitz – the "Panzer Graf". Philadelphia; Oxford: Casemate Publishers. ISBN 978-1-61200-222-4.
- Brantberg, Robert (2000). Sotasankarit. 21 suomalaisen sotasankarin elämäntarina (in Finnish). Gummerus (1st ed.). [Tampere]: Revontuli. ISBN 952-5170-11-X. OCLC 58273901.
- Cooper, Tom; Bishop, Farzad (2004), Holmes, Tony; Hales-Dutton, Bruce (eds.), Iranian F-14 Tomcat Units in Combat, Osprey Combat Aircraft, vol. 49, Oxford: Osprey Publishing, ISBN 1-84176-787-5
- Dixon, Jeremy (2019). The U-Boat Commanders — Knight's Cross Holders 1939–1945. Yorkshire, UK: Pen and Sword Books. ISBN 978-1-52671-873-0.
- Dunstan, Simon (2020). British Battle Tanks: Post-war Tanks 1946–2016. Osprey Publishing. ISBN 978-1472833365.
- Foreman, John; Harvey, S.E. (1995), Messerschmitt Combat Diary Me.262, Crecy Publishing Ltd, ISBN 1-871187-30-3.
- Forty, George (1997). Tank Aces: From Blitzkrieg to the Gulf War. Motorbooks Intl. ISBN 0750914475.
- Forty, George (2009). Tiger Tank Battalions in World War II. Zenith Imprint. ISBN 978-1616732622.
- Giorgerini, Giorgio (2002). Uomini sul fondo : storia del sommergibilismo italiano dalle origini a oggi. Milano: Mondadori. ISBN 8804505370.
- Hadley, Michael L. (1995). Count Not the Dead: The Popular Image of the German Submarine. Montreal: McGill-Queen's University Press. ISBN 9780773512825.
- Hannah, Craig C. (2002). Striving for air superiority: the Tactical Air Command in Vietnam. Texas A&M University Press. ISBN 978-1-58544-146-4.
- Hart, Sydney (2008). Submarine Upholder. Gloucester: Amberley. ISBN 978-1-84868-116-3.
- Hensel, Howard M. (2020). Air Power in the Indian Ocean and the Western Pacific: Understanding Regional Security Dynamics. Routledge. ISBN 9781000091779.
- Hinchliffe, Peter (1998). Luftkrieg bei Nacht 1939–1945 [Air War at Night 1939–1945] (in German). Stuttgart, Germany: Motorbuch Verlag. ISBN 978-3-613-01861-7.
- Kenney, General George C. (15 August 2014) [1960]. Dick Bong: Ace Of Aces. Verdun Press. ISBN 978-1-78289-909-9.
- Kershaw, Robert J. (2008). Tank Men: the Human Story of Tanks at War. London: Hodder & Stoughton. ISBN 9780340923474.
- Nicolle, David; Cooper, Tom (2004). Arab MiG-19 and MiG-21 Units in Combat. Combat Aircraft. UK: Osprey Publishing. ISBN 978-1-84176-655-3.
- O'Kane, Richard H. (1978). Clear the Bridge! The War Patrols of the USS Tang. London: Macdonald & Jane's. ISBN 0354011855.
- Polak, Tomas; Shores, Christopher (1999). Stalin's Falcon – The Aces of the Red Star. London: Grub Street. ISBN 1-902304-01-2.
- Rabinovich, Abraham (2005). The Yom Kippur War. New York: McGraw-Hill. ISBN 0-8052-1124-1.
- Robertson, Linda R. (2003). The Dream of Civilized Warfare: World War I Flying Aces and the American Imagination. Minneapolis: University of Minneapolis Press. ISBN 978-0-8166-4270-0.
- Roscoe, Theodore (1949). United States Submarine Operations in World War II. Annapolis, Maryland: United States Naval Institute.
- Rose, Larry (23 April 2015). "Tank Ace began stellar career at Normandy". The Globe and Mail.
- Samuel, Wolfgang W.E. (2004). American Raiders – The Race to Capture the Luftwaffe's Secrets. Jackson: University Press of Mississippi. ISBN 978-1-57806-649-0.
- Schneider, Wolfgang (2000). Tigers in Combat I. Mechanicsburg: Stackpole Books. ISBN 978-0-8117-3171-3.
- Schneider, Wolfgang (2005). Tigers in Combat II. Mechanicsburg: Stackpole Books. ISBN 978-0-8117-3203-1.
- Seidov, Igor (2016). Советские асы корейской войны. Moscow: Фонд содействия авиации «Русские витязи». ISBN 978-5-903389-35-3. OCLC 970400945.
- Stockert, Peter (2012) [1996]. Die Eichenlaubträger 1939–1945 Band 1 [The Oak Leaves Bearers 1939–1945 Volume 1] (in German) (4th ed.). Bad Friedrichshall, Germany: Friedrichshaller Rundblick. ISBN 978-3-9802222-7-3.
- Toliver, Raymond F.; Constable, Trevor J. (1998) [1977]. Die deutschen Jagdflieger-Asse 1939–1945 [The German Fighter Aces 1939-1945] (in German). Stuttgart, Germany: Motorbuch Verlag. ISBN 978-3-87943-193-9.
- Tucker, Spencer C.; Wood, Laura Matysek; Murphy, Justin D. (1996). The European Powers in the First World War. New York: Garland Pub. ISBN 0-8153-0399-8.
- Tucker-Jones, Anthony (2020). Hitler's Panzers: The Complete History 1933–1945. Pen and Sword Military. ISBN 978-1-5267-4161-5.
- Tuohy, William (2009). The Bravest Man. Random House. ISBN 978-0307554871.
- Varhola, Michael J. (2000), Fire and Ice: The Korean War, 1950–1953, Mason City, Iowa: Da Capo Press, ISBN 978-1-882810-44-4
- Woolner, Frank (22 September 1944). "THE TEXAS TANKER". YANK Magazine.
