= Armored Weaponry Museum, Poznań =

Armored Weaponry Museum of the Museum of Polish Army
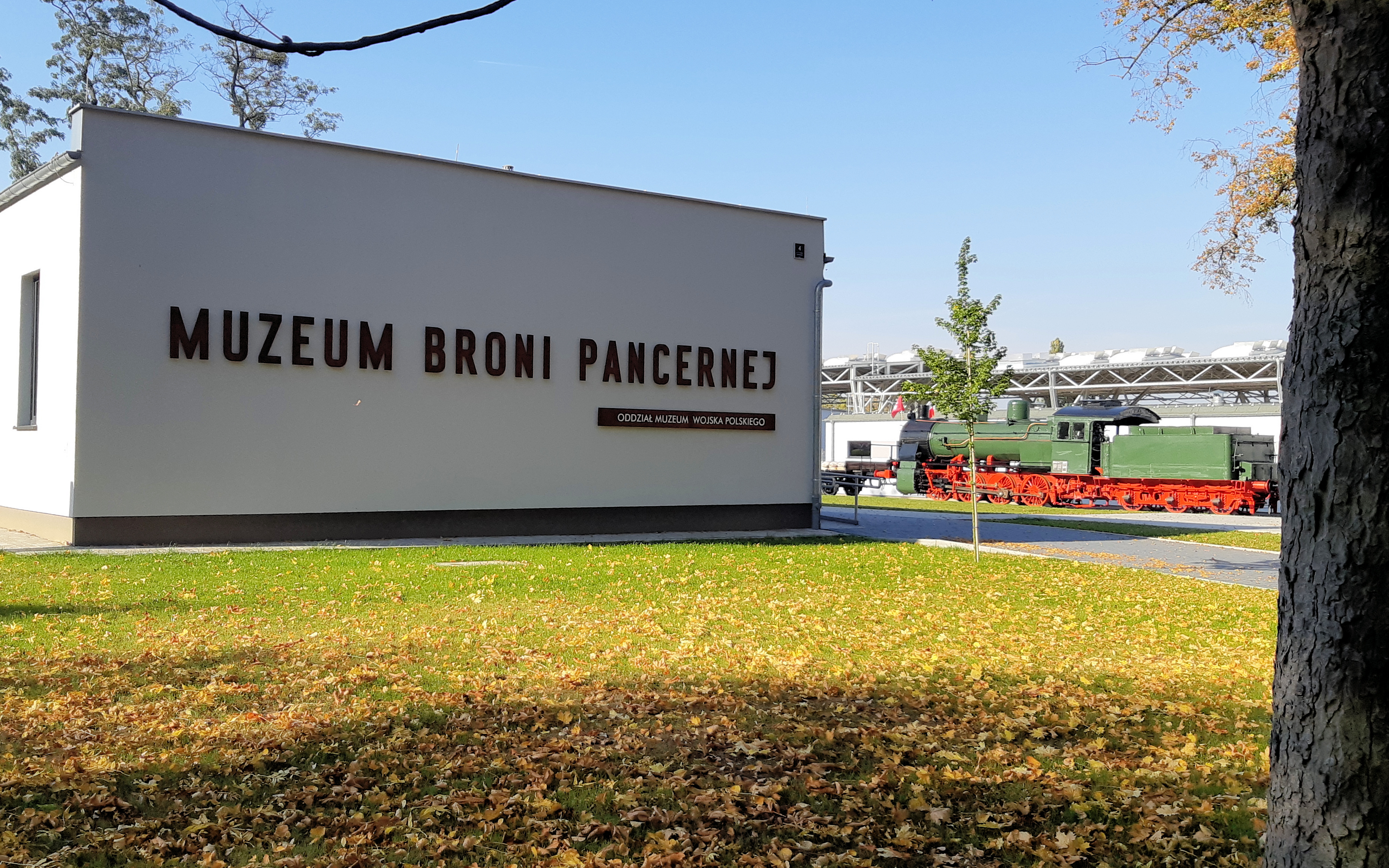
- Armored Weaponry Museum
- Established: 1963
- Location: Poznań, Poland
- Coordinates: 52°25′58″N 16°53′27″E
- Type: Museum division
- Director: ppłk Tomasz Ogrodniczuk
- Website: muzeumbronipancernej.pl

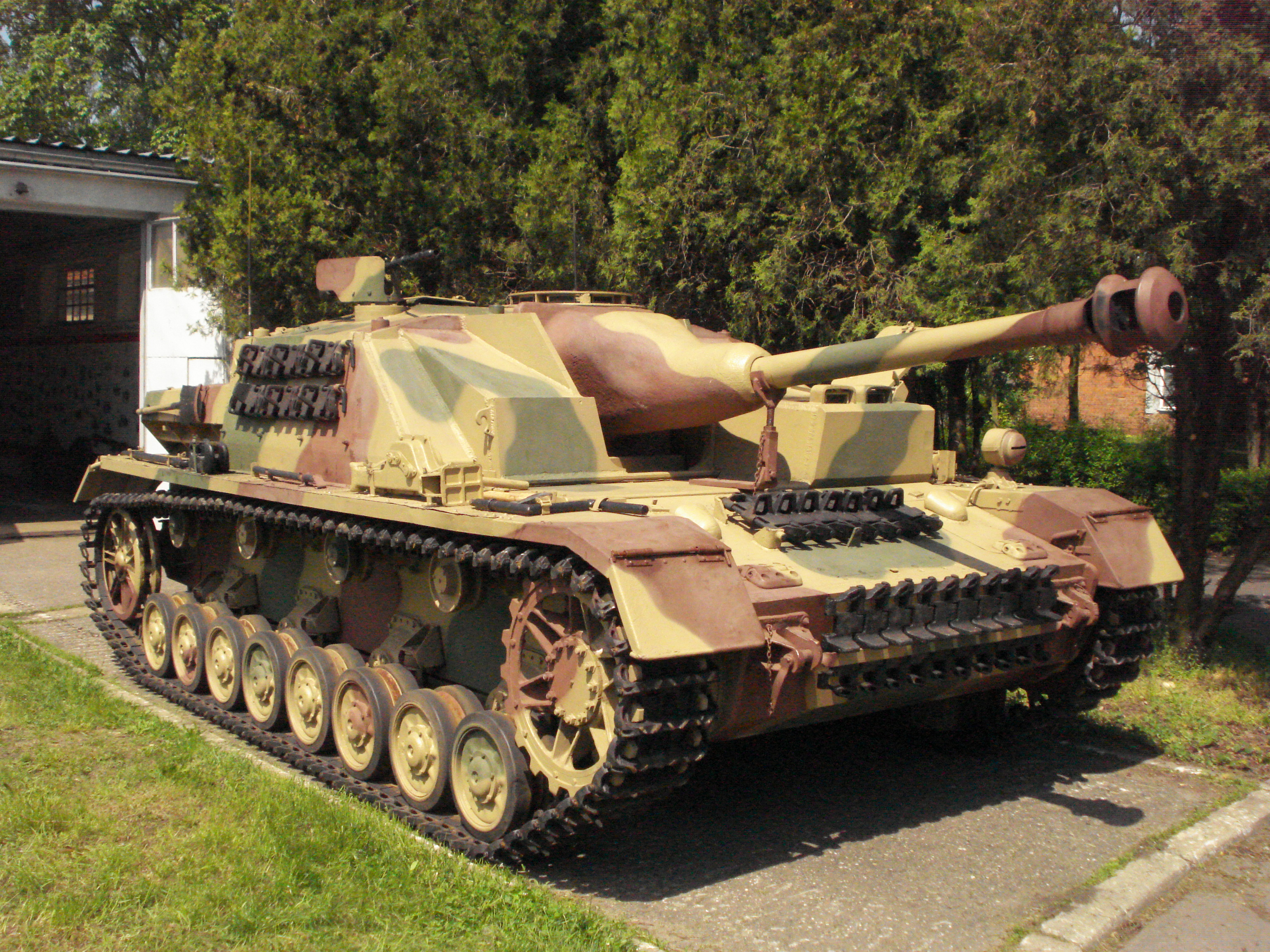
Sturmgeschütz IV from 2.Pz.Jg.Abt. "Brandenburg" (2nd Anti-tank Battalion) restored in 2009

Muzeum Broni Pancernej Centrum Szkolenia Wojsk Lądowych im. Hetmana Polnego Koronnego Stefana Czarnieckiego w Poznaniu, (Armored Weapons Museum of the Land Forces Training Center named after Field Crown Hetman Stefan Czarniecki in Poznań) abbreviated Muzeum Broni Pancernej CSWL (Armoured Warfare Museum) is a large collection of military vehicles, formerly located within Land Forces Training Center in Poznań, Poland.

The museum has the largest collection of armoured fighting vehicles in Poland, displaying around 60 vehicles from the First World War, interwar, Second World War and Cold War periods. In 2018, the old museum was closed to visitors; it was re-opened in early 2019 in a new location.

== History ==
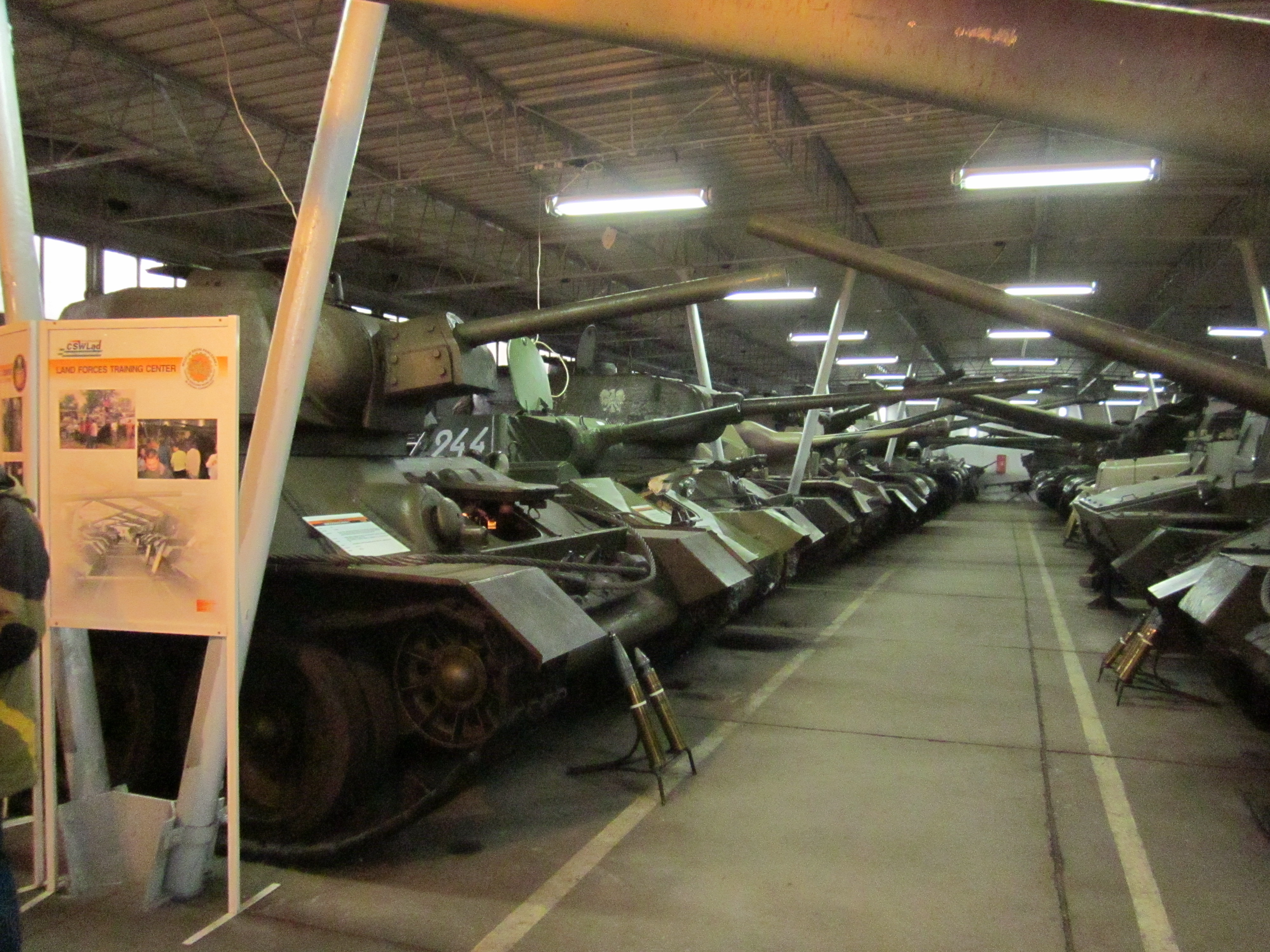
The original storage shed used until 2019.

The museum was established in 1963, as a small collection of vehicles formerly used by the local military training center. It was located in former barracks in Sołacz district. For most of the Communist period, the only vehicles in the museum were those of Soviet (or USSR's satellites) production. After the fall of communism in Poland in 1989, the museum started to acquire non-Soviet exhibits (Western or German) as well.

The museum was located inside a single hangar, housing much of its exhibits, although some vehicles were stored outside.

The museum's curator is Lt Col Tomasz Ogrodniczuk, who also participates in the restoration efforts and would occasionally drive certain vehicles during the "Armoured Parade" - from the museum's hangar to the Training Center's parade square.

In November 2013 it was announced that by 2015, the museum will be turned into a branch of Land Forces Museum in Bydgoszcz. This offered several advantages, the most important being financial aid from the state, and also that the museum will be open to visitors for all year long. Ultimately, however, the museum was turned into a branch of Polish Army Museum in Warsaw. In January 2015 it was announced that the museum will be moved to an unused hangar near the Ławica airport by June 2017. As of 2017, the museum was no longer accessible, and expected to be reopened in spring 2019, after the restoration of the hangars and relocation of the exhibits is finished.

The museum was eventually reopened on 8 October 2019.

== Excavations and restorations ==
In 2008, a German Sturmgeschütz IV assault gun was recovered from the Rgilewka river near Grzegorzew. It was moved to Poznań and by the summer of 2009, it was restored to running condition. As of 2012, it's the only running StuG IV in the world and one of three preserved examples at all (one is also in Poland and second in Latvia)

On August 5, 2011, a German Sd.Kfz. 6 artillery tractor was excavated from Warta river near Białobrzeg. Exactly one year later, on August 5, 2012, its restoration was officially finished. Thanks to the restoration team's efforts, much of the vehicle is original (only the wooden elements and thinnest metal parts were replaced), though as of 2012, its engine is still being restored and it uses a replacement powerplant.

In April 2012 the museum acquired the wreckage of TKS tankette (lower hull only) and first presented it on June 2 of that year. The restoration took two years and was finished in May 2014. In October 2012, renovation of BTR-152 APC was finished. Almost simultaneously, the restoration of IS-2 heavy tank was launched. One month later, T-70 tank was also taken to repair shop. They were finished in June and February 2013, respectively.

In late 2012 a Renault FT tank was brought from Afghanistan and initially brought to Poznań and exhibited shortly near the Poznań National Museum and the Bazar Hotel. The tank was to be restored in Poznań with the help of Armoured Warfare Museum, however it was eventually sent to Polish Army Museum in Warsaw and restored by the end of 2013.

In June 2013, a Cruiser Tank Mk VIII Centaur Mk I was brought from Portugal. Such tanks were used by Polish Armed Forces in the West during World War II for training. Its restoration began in May 2014.

In September 2013, three new vehicles were acquired from Norway - a wreck of Panzer III medium tank, an M47 Patton main battle tank and an M88 Recovery Vehicle. It was the second time when the museum worked together with Norwegian authorities, the first being the acquisition of the TKS tankette. Thanks to the assistance from Polish Army Museum in Warsaw, another wreck was donated to the museum, and the two wrecks were used to complete a single vehicle.

In 2014, the T-54 and T-55 tanks were taken to Wrocław to take part in the shooting of Bridge of Spies, standing for NVA vehicles in East Berlin. Steven Spielberg and Janusz Kamiński left their signatures on the latter tank.

In June 2015, an M10 Achilles tank destroyer was donated to the museum and is currently under restoration.

In September 2016, a Daimler Dingo scout car was donated to the museum from the United States. Such cars were used by the Polish Armed Forces in the West, and after a renovation, it was given the markings of 15th Poznań Uhlan Regiment.

In October 2017, the museum acquired a 7.7 cm FK 96 n.A. gun, once exhibited outside of the Czocha Castle, which was severely damaged by elements and tourists. In December of that year, the renovation of the gun was finished, and it was decided it will stay in the museum to prevent further destruction. Around the same time, the museum acquired another artillery piece, a 10.5 cm leFH 18 howitzer. Since its restoration, it has been exhibited side by side with its dedicated tractor, the Sd.Kfz. 6.

In January 2018, the museum acquired three new vehicles: a Jagdpanzer 38(t) Hetzer tank destroyer, an M4A1 Half-Track and a replica of an Austin Putilov armoured car (all three from private owners). All three vehicles are in running condition.

In May 2020, a Fox Armoured Car, found in Italian scrapyard by Polish soldiers taking part in Operation Irini, was delivered for restoration. Much like the aforementioned Dingos, such cars were used by the 15th Poznan Uhlans Regiment and one of the aims of the restoration process is to determine whether this particular vehicle was a part of this unit during the war.

== Exhibits ==
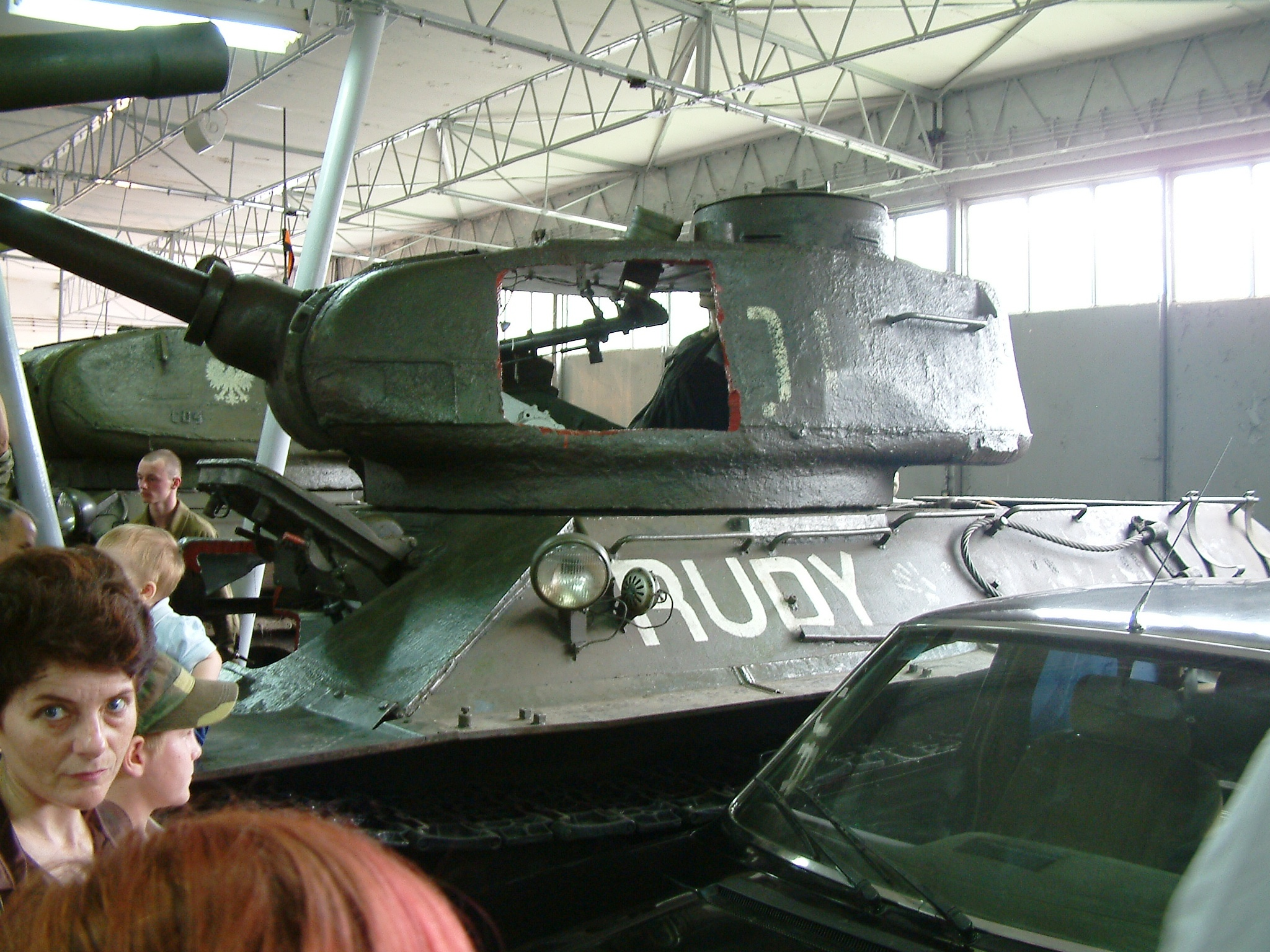
"Rudy 102" inside the museum hangar

Exhibits in italics are under restoration and are not part of current exhibition (as of 2020).

=== Tanks ===
- TKS tankette - restored to running order in May 2014.
- 7TP - on loan from Warsaw
- Panzer III - acquired from Norway, under restoration
- T-70 light tank - in running condition; the last remaining example of this tank in Poland.
  - It was used to counter Ukrainian nationalists in south-eastern Poland in the 1940s; after it was set on fire in combat, it was partially repaired and put on the monument in Baligród to commemorate the victims of UPA-led genocide. In 1975, it was replaced by a T-34 and transferred to the museum.
- T-34/76
- Three T-34/85s - one inside the museum, in running condition, one formerly outside as gate guardian (currently removed for restoration and replaced with a PT-91), and one wartime production tank that was excavated from Biedrusko firing range (restored and rebuilt as a virtual reality tank simulator)
- T-34/85 "Rudy"
  - This tank was damaged during the battle of Poznań and later used for film making; holes were cut in its hull and turret to insert cameras
- IS-2 - in running condition
- IS-3 - one of two tanks of this type in Poland (the other one is in Warsaw); they were acquired for evaluation, but were deemed unsatisfying and sent to the firing ranges before being restored and donated to the museums
- T-54
- T-55A
- PT-76 - restored to running condition in 2015
- PT-91 "Wilk" - a prototype of Polish PT-91 Twardy tank
- M47 Patton - acquired from Norway
  - While this particular tank never served in the French Army, it bears the markings of the French 5e regiment de cuirassiers Royal Pologne (5th "King of Poland" Cuirassier Regiment), formed in Lorraine by former King of Poland Stanisław Leszczyński
- M48A5 and M60A1 Patton tanks - both in running condition; acquired from Greece in 2012

=== Self-propelled guns and rocket artillery ===
- Jagdpanzer 38(t) Hetzer - in running condition, wartime production vehicle
- Sturmgeschütz IV - in running condition; it was the only running StuG IV in the world until June 2020 when the Australian Armour and Artillery Museum restored their own vehicle
- SU-76M
  - The gun has an inscription, Zemsta za Katyń (Revenge for Katyn), barely visible under the camouflage on the gun mantlet. The unit in which the vehicle served - 27th Tank Regiment - was made of Soviet soldiers claiming to be descendants of the 1863 January insurgents, and nicknamed "Katyń's Avengers", to propagate the Soviet version of the Katyń massacre being perpetrated by the Germans in 1941 after the Nazi invasion of the Soviet Union
- M10 Achilles - in running condition
- SU-100 - in running condition
- ISU-122
- ISU-152
- ASU-85
- 2S1 Goździk
- 2S7 Pion
- 9K52 Luna-M

=== Armoured cars and personnel carriers ===
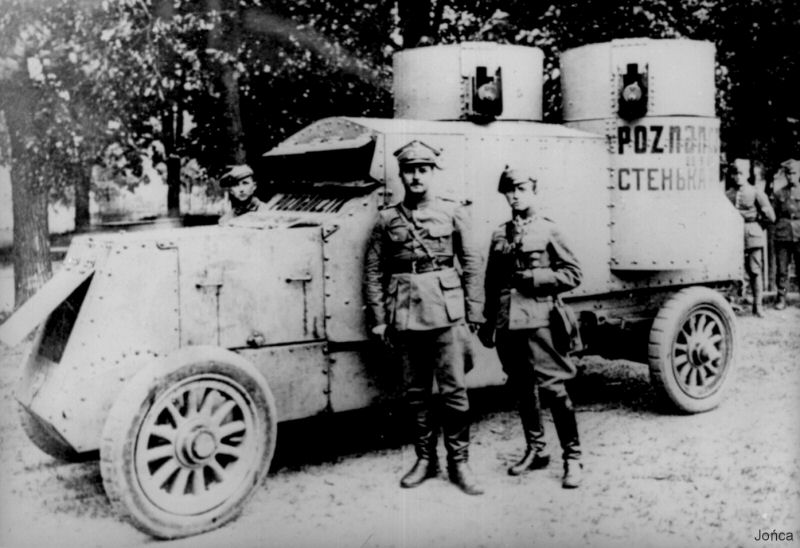
Austin-Putilov «Poznańczyk» near Babruysk, Polish–Soviet War 1920. The museum acquired a running replica in January 2018.

- Austin Putilov - full-scale replica, in running condition
  - The vehicle bears the markings of an armoured car captured from the Red Army by the 55th Infantry Regiment of 14th Greater Poland Infantry Division near Babruysk, with both names (the initial Stenka Razin and the later Poznańczyk) and the date of capture (May 28, 1920) painted on its sides.
- Daimler Dingo - in running condition
- Fox Armoured Car
- M4A1 Half-Track - in running condition
- BTR-152 - in running condition
- BTR-60
- BRDM-2
- FUG
- OT-64 SKOT
- OT-62 TOPAS

=== Artillery tractors and recovery vehicles ===
- C2P - on loan from Warsaw
- Sd.Kfz. 6 - in running condition
- MTS-306 - a prototype of Polish artillery tractor, did not reach serial production due to political and financial issues
- WPT-34
- M88 Recovery Vehicle - in running condition, occasionally used to move other vehicles in the museum

=== Other vehicles ===
- Infantry railway car of the Poznańczyk armoured train
- ZIL-111D - a convertible limousine used by Communist authorities (in running condition). Only 8 examples of the D model were made, two are known to remain in Poland
- Several VIP cars of various types

=== Towed artillery ===
- ZiS-2
- ZiS-3
- M-30
- 7.7 cm FK 96 n.A.
- 10.5 cm leFH 18

=== Wrecks ===
- Jagdpanzer IV (frontal armour and wheels)

=== Former exhibits ===
- Sherman Firefly - formerly; brought from Belgium, transferred to the Museum of the Second World War in Gdańsk.
  - The tank was in running condition while in Poznań, but used a post-war truck engine and gearbox. After the transfer, it was put on permanent static display inside the museum and the engine was removed.

== Visiting the museum ==
Formerly, because the museum was located inside the military area, it was necessary to pre-arrange the visit by acquiring an entry permit from the CSWL command. However, during certain events (Child Day in May/June and the CSWL Patron's Day in September/October), visitors could enter it without permits.

Since the museum was moved to a new location, no permits are needed, but tickets must be acquired before entry. The museum is open from Wednesday to Sunday, however opening hours might be subject to change without prior warning due to organisational matters (e.g. arrival of new exhibits). Thursday is a ticket-free entry day.

=== Location and access ===
The old museum was located on the 86/90 Wojska Polskiego Street, north-west from the city center. The new site is located closer to the Ławica airport, on 4 "3 Pułku Lotniczego" Street, close to the intersection with Dąbrowskiego Street, with the nearest bus stop being Tatrzańska. During the summer season, a special "102" heritage bus line between the Poznań Main Station and the museum is launched.

== See also ==
- Museum of Polish Army
- Muzeum im. Orła Białego
- Muzeum Polskiej Techniki Wojskowej
- Muzeum Lotnictwa Polskiego w Krakowie
