= Museum of Polish Military Technology =

Museum in Mokotów, Warsaw, Poland

Coordinates: 52°10′57″N 21°03′59″E

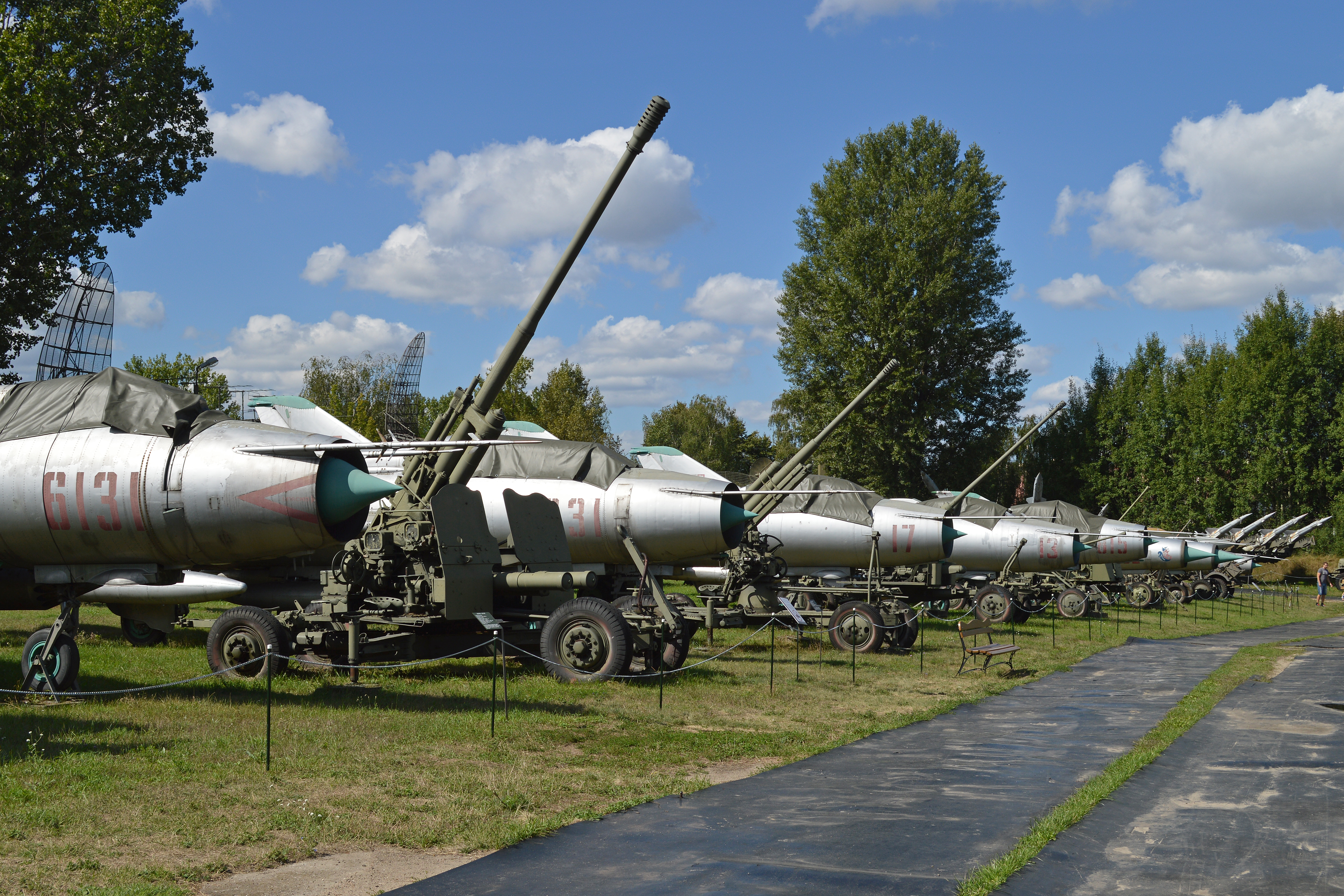
- Soviet-produced military jets and artillery displayed outdoors at the museum
- Location: Warsaw, Poland
- Director: Mirosław Zientarzewski
- Website: muzeumptw.pl

The Museum of Polish Military Technology (Polish: Muzeum Polskiej Techniki Wojskowej) is a military museum in the Mokotów district of Warsaw, Poland. It is a branch of the Polish Army Museum. It is located in former Fort IX of the Warsaw Fortress.

== Description ==
The museum is located in a former Russian fortress which is divided by Powsińska Street in two parts, the larger part being the museum and the smaller part being Szczubełka Park. In the 1990s, with the retirement of obsolete military equipment, the Polish Army Museum built a warehouse, which later opened as an outdoor exhibition branch of the museum.

Because the branch has a larger area than the main museum, the site is also used for storage and restoration of equipment.

== Exhibits ==
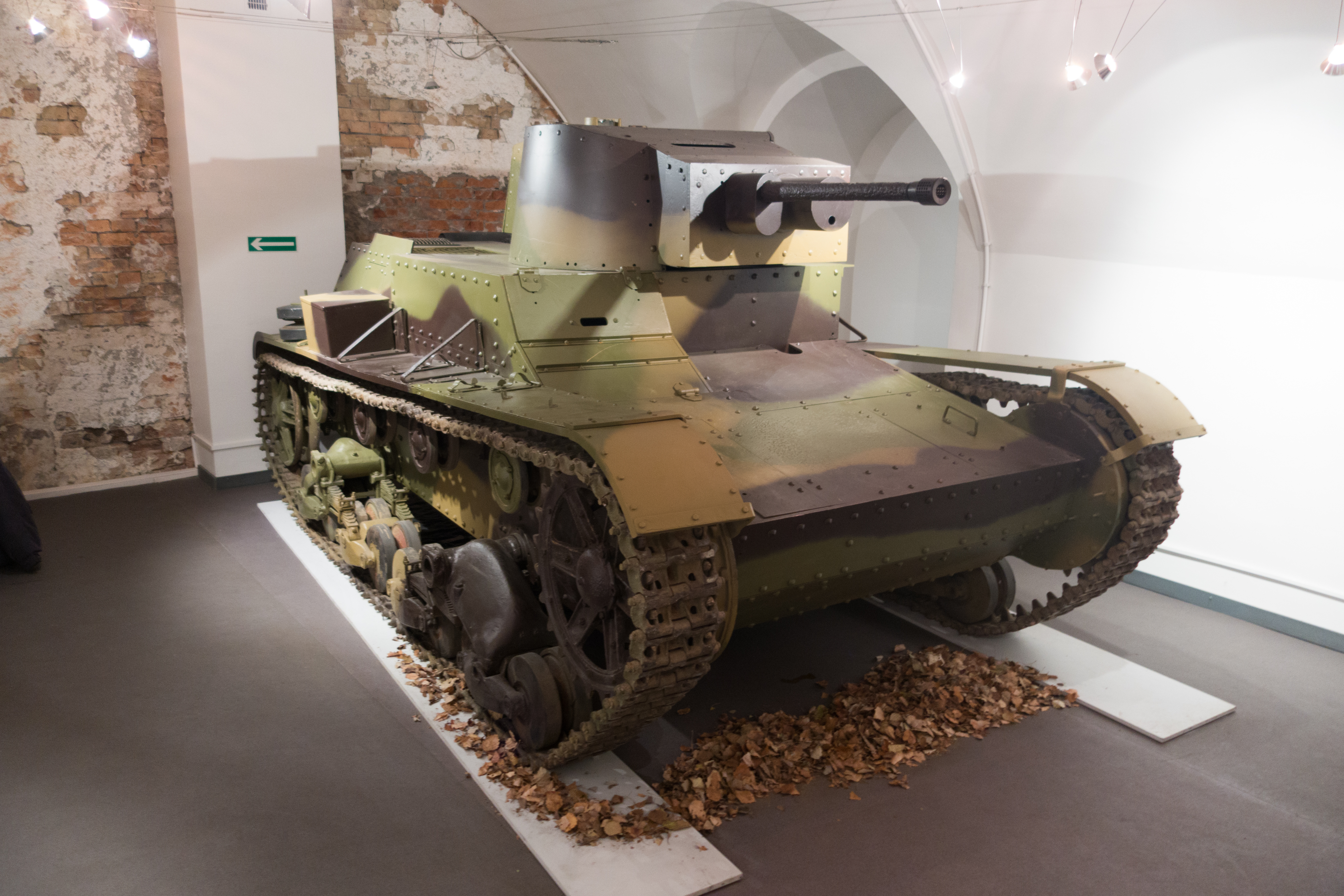
7TP

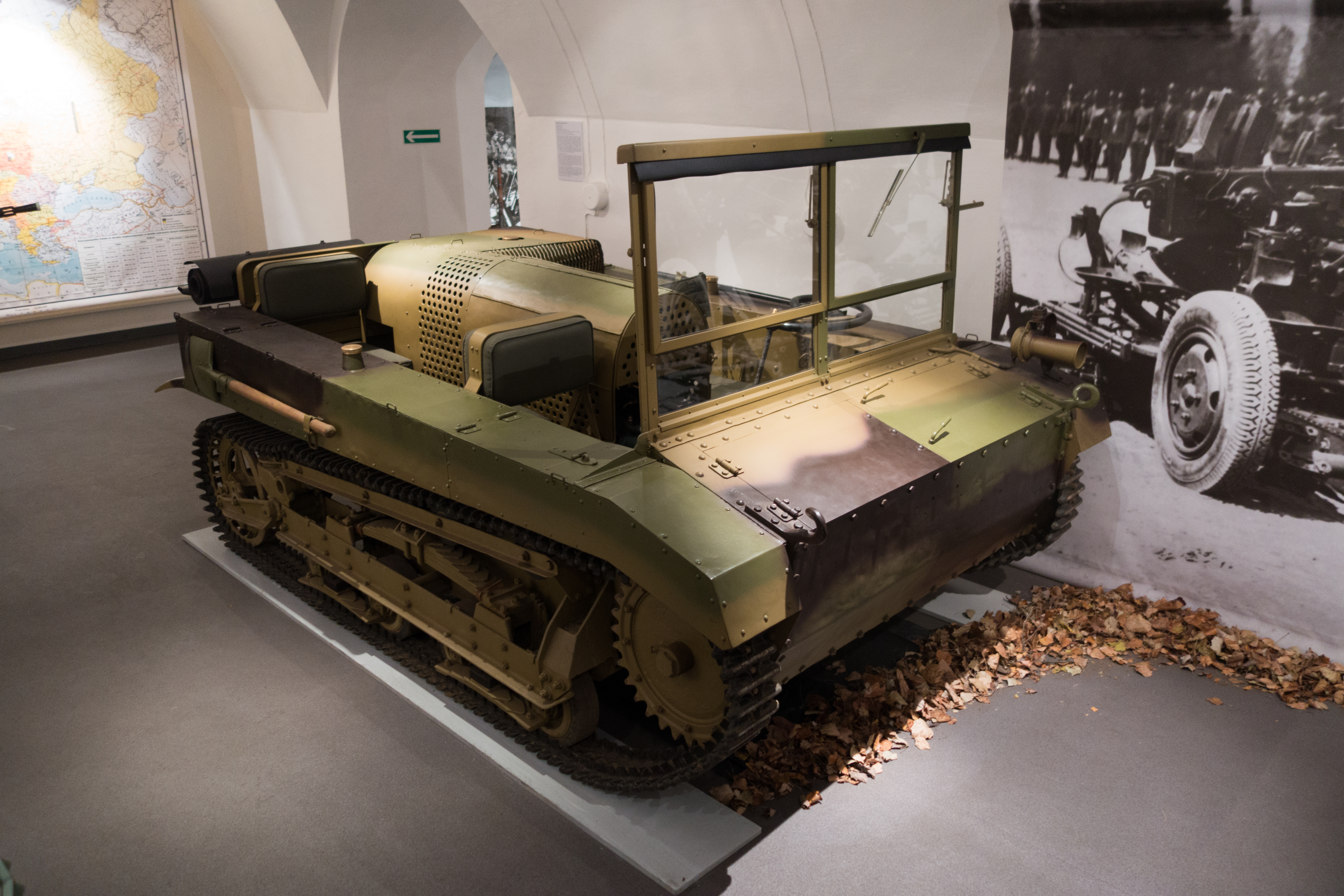
C2P

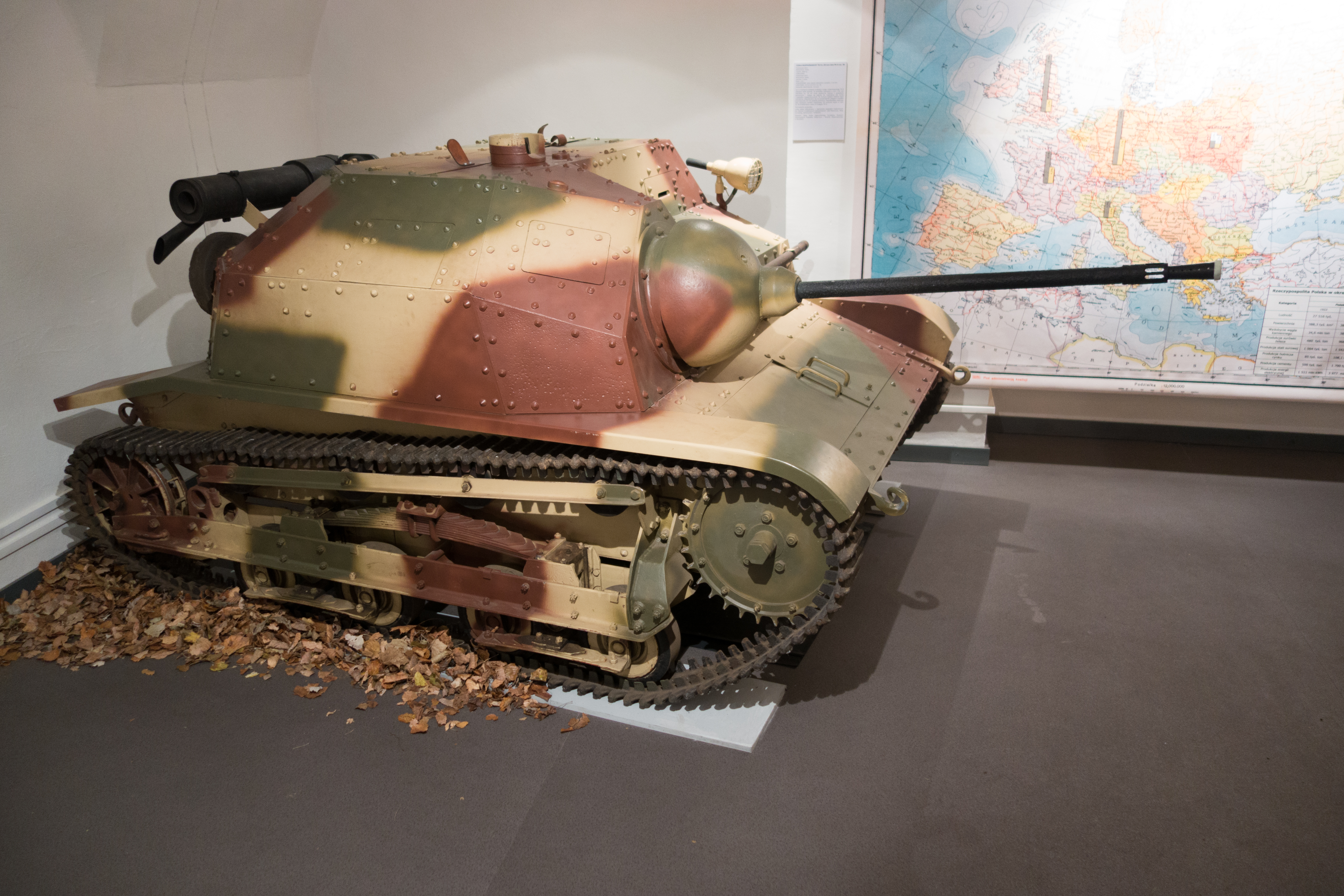
TKS-NKM

=== Tanks ===
- T-34 model 1942
- T-34/85
- T-55U
- T-55AM
- T-55AM WOŁNA
- T-72
- IS-2m
- IS-3
- PT-76
- fragmented 7TP

=== Other vehicles ===
- ISU-152
- ISU-122
- SU-85
- SU-76
- ASU-85
- reconstructed TKS
- Universal carrier, model T-16
- Humber scout car
- BRDM
- BRDM-2
- BTR-40
- BTR-60
- BTR-152
- BTR-152W
- TOPAS,
- TOPAS-2AP, /
- FUG,
- SKOT
- SKOT-2A
- SKOT-R3
- SKOT-R6
- SKOT-2
- MT-LB
- BWP
- S-75M Dźwina (SA-2)
- S-125 Newa (SA-3)
- ZSU-23-4
- ZSU-57-2
- M107 SPG
- Soyuz 30 descent module

=== Planes ===
- MiG-15
- Lim-2 (MiG-15 bis)
- Lim-5 (MiG-17F)
- Lim-6 bis
- SBLim-2A
- MiG-23MF
- MiG-21MS
- MiG-21PS
- MiG-21US
- MiG-21SPS
- MiG-21UM
- Su-20
- Su-7BM
- Su-7BKŁ
- Su-7U
- Ił-28
- PZL Mi-2R
- PZL Mi-2T
- PZL Mi-2URN
- fragmented B-17
- fragmented B-24
- An-2
- Jak-23
- TS-8 Bies 1E0409

== Literature ==
- Zawadzki Wojciech, Polskie muzea wojskowe: informator, Towarzystwo Przyjaciół Muzeum Tradycji POW. Bydgoszcz, 2002.

== Gallery ==
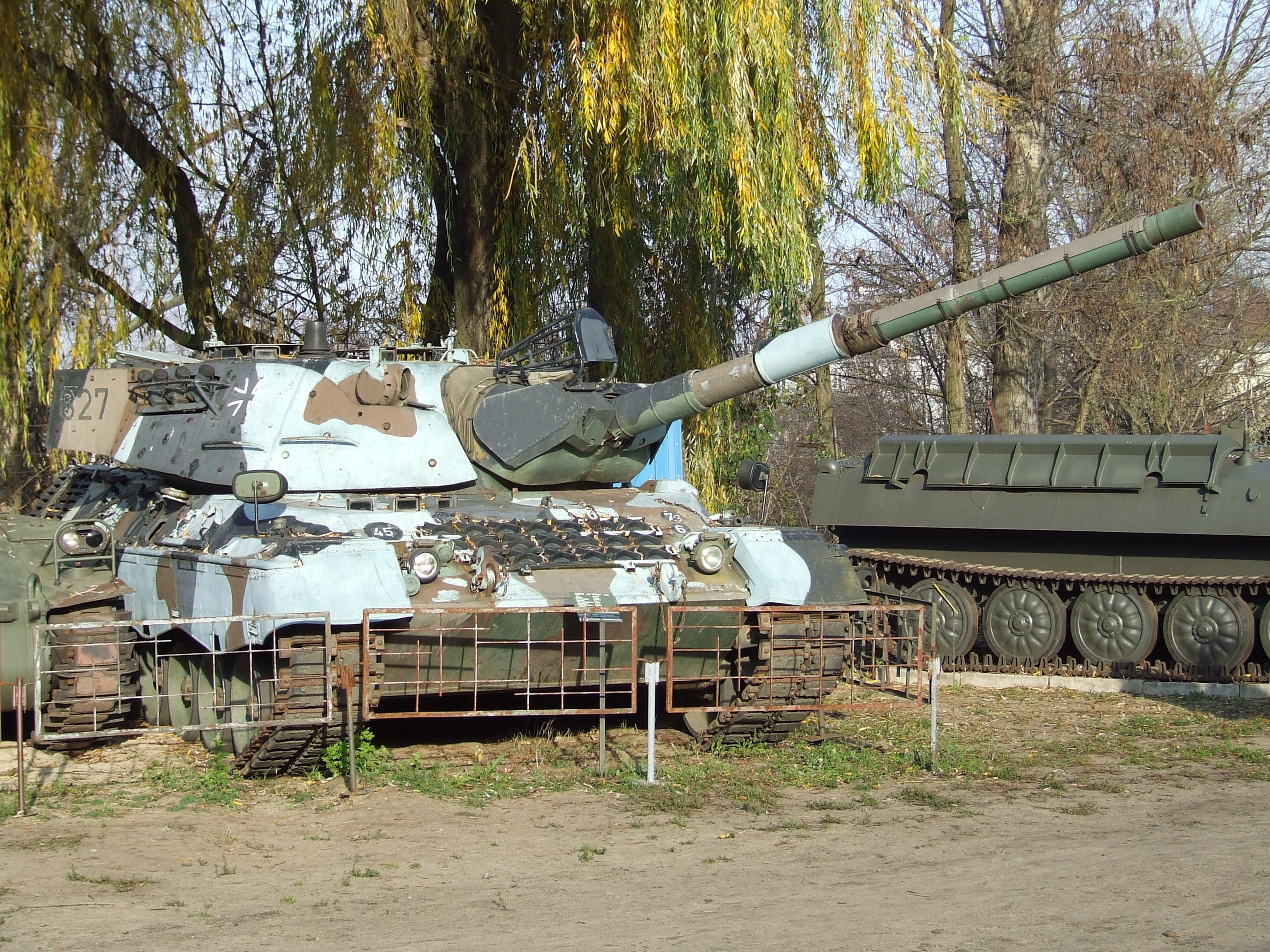
Leopard 1A4

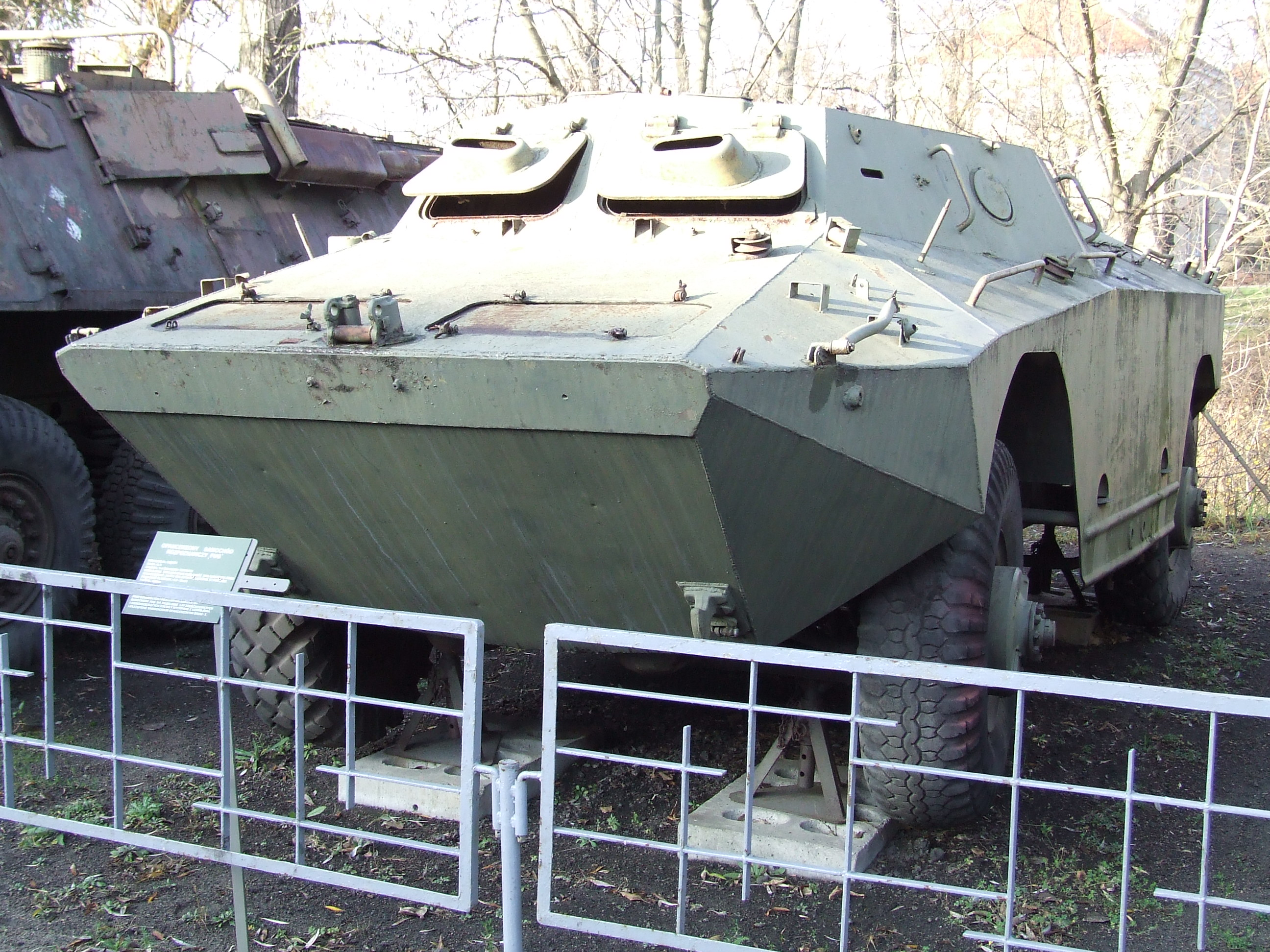
FUG

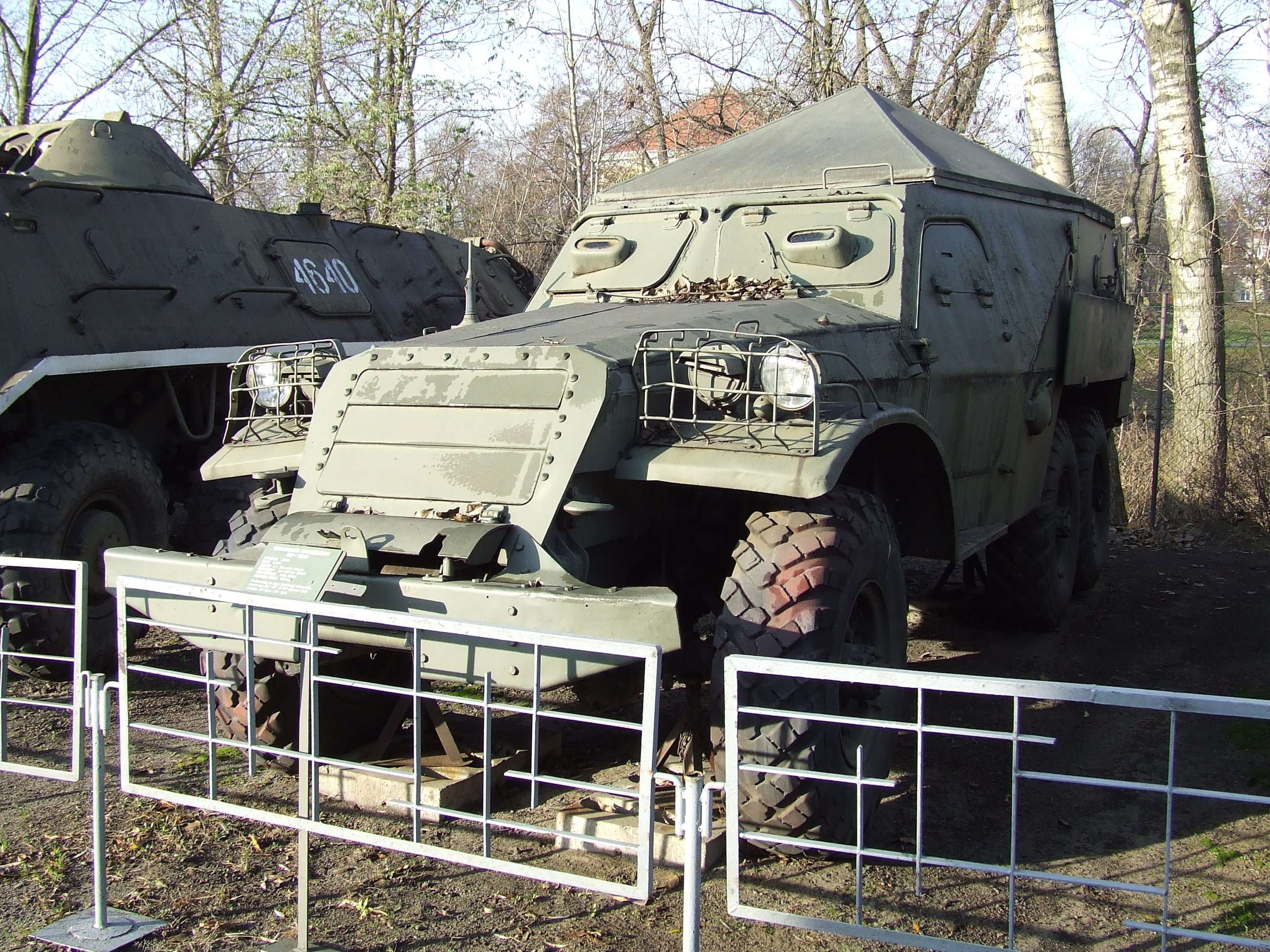
BTR-152W

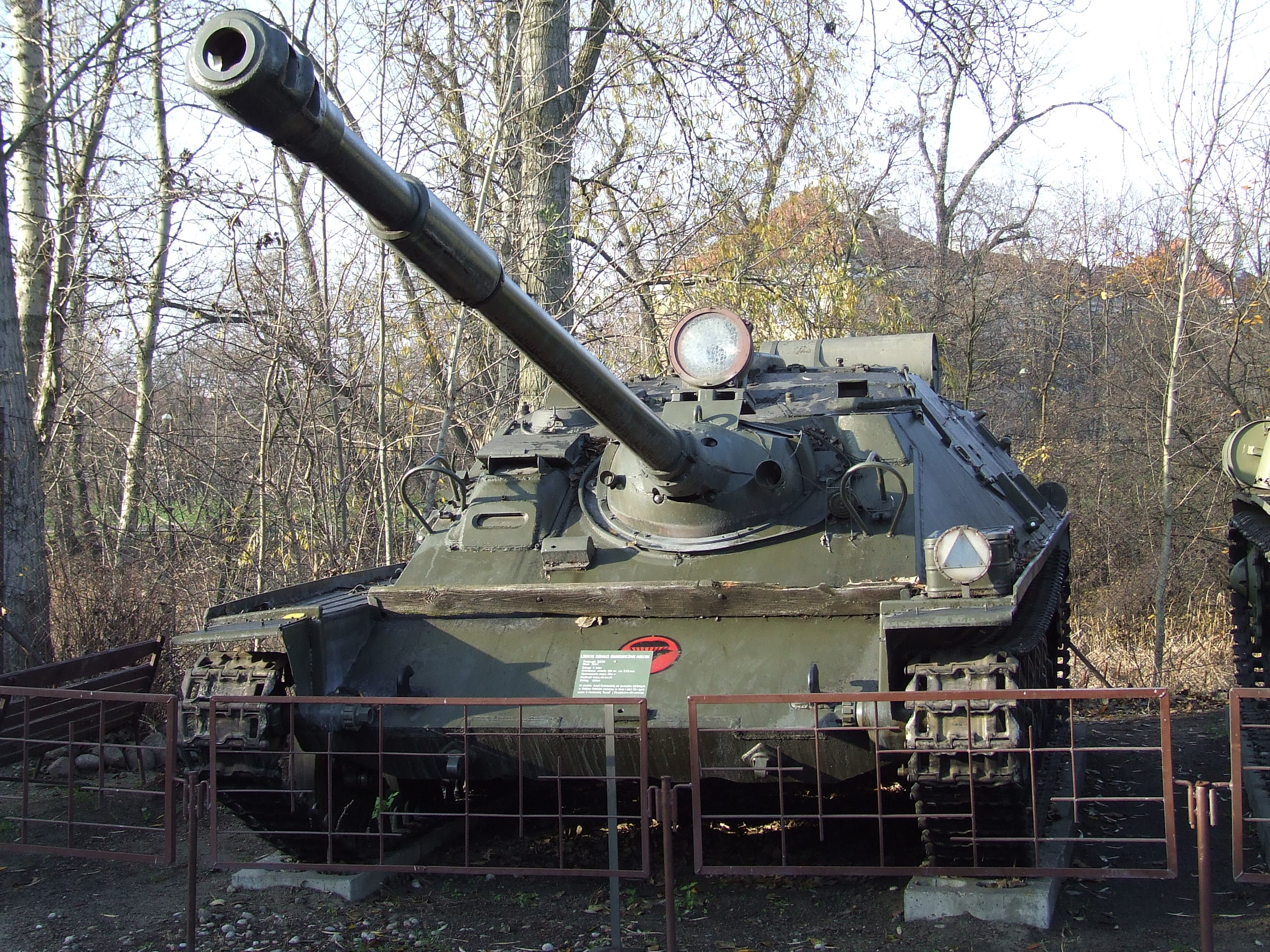
ASU-85

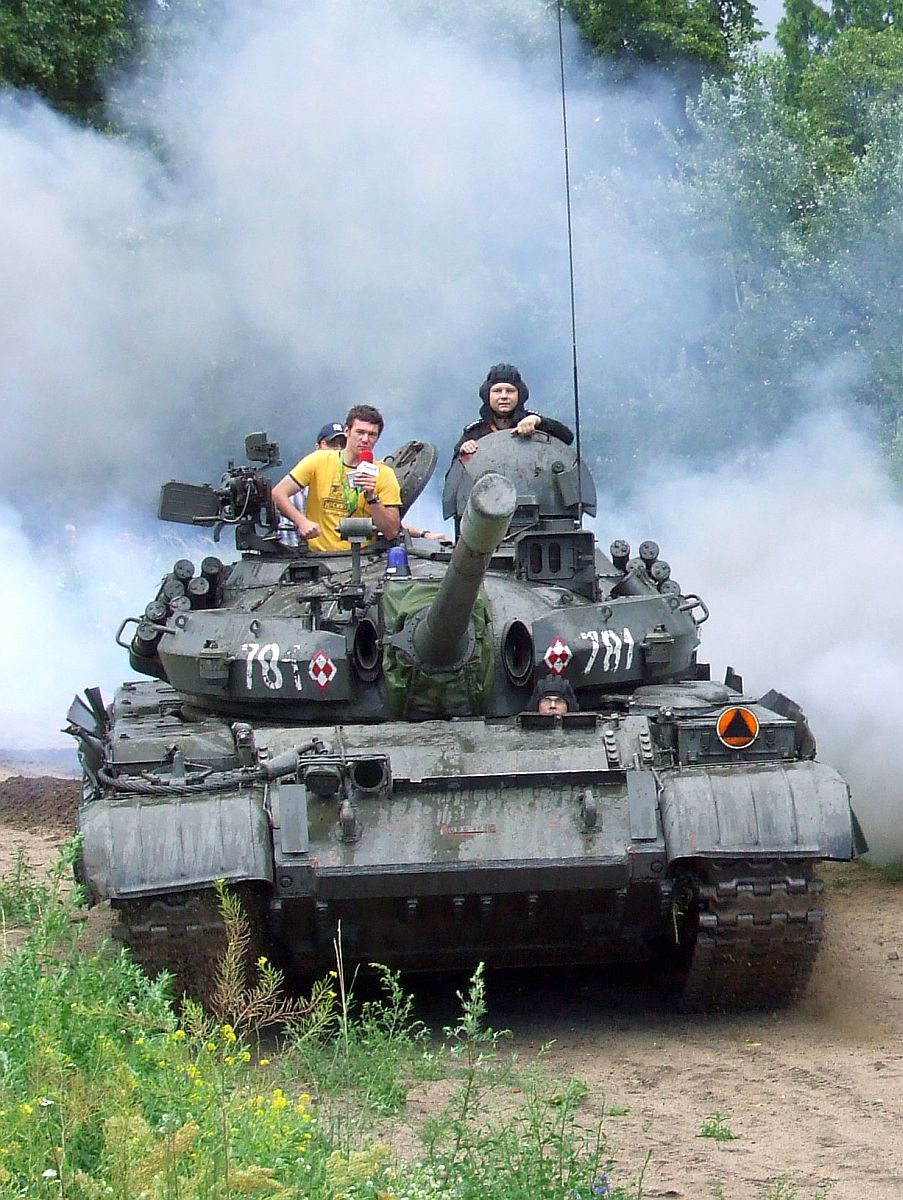
T-55AM Merida

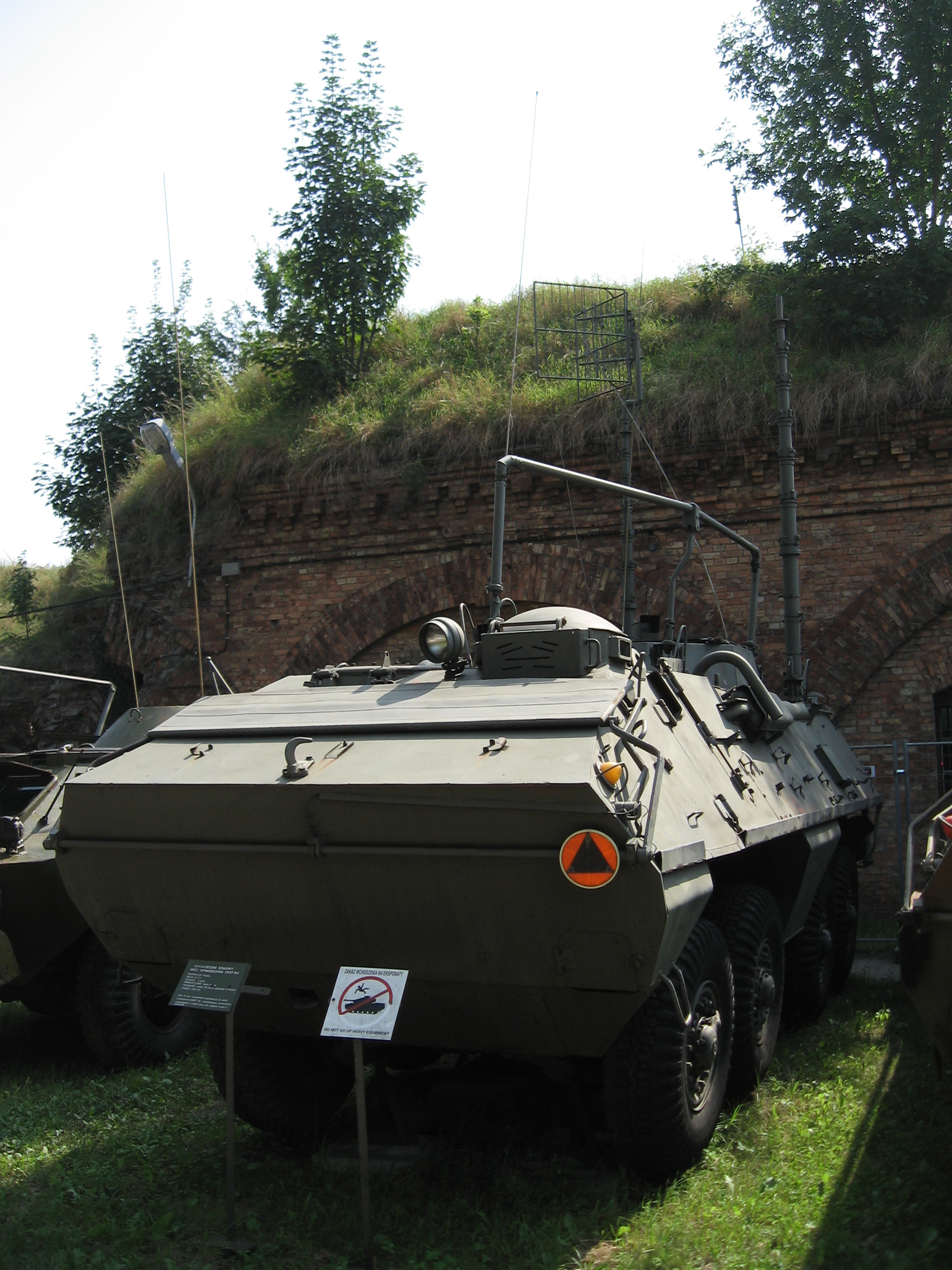
SKOT-R6

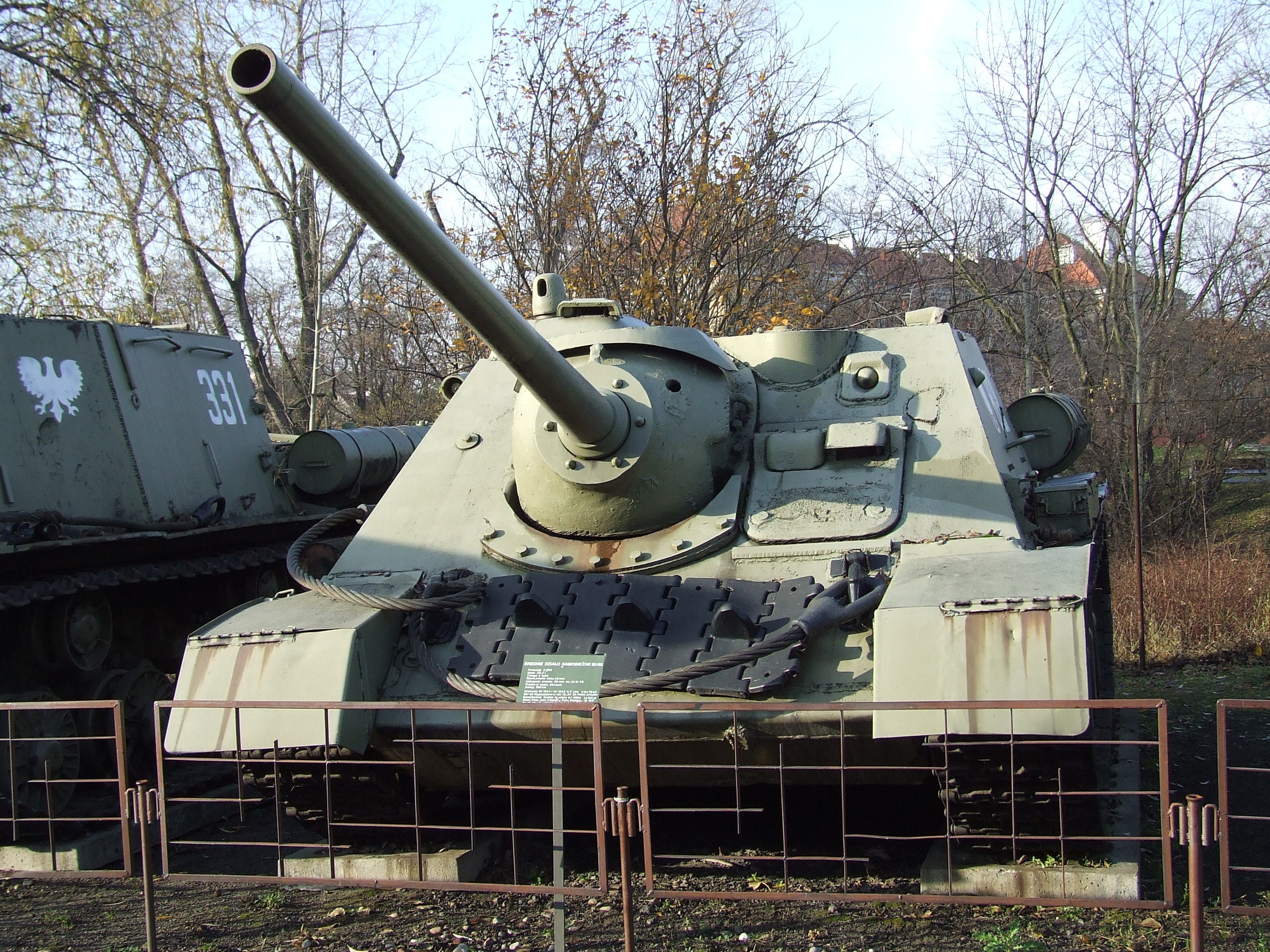
SU-85
