= Janusz Magnuski =

Janusz Magnuski (1933–1999) was a Polish author and military historian. His principal works document the development and deployment of Polish and Soviet armor utilized during World War II and he has been called "the world's most noted historian of Soviet tank history". He was one of the authoritative sources for documentation of the hardware on display in the Museum of the Polish Army located in Warsaw.

He was born in Poland on August 12, 1933 and died of Amyotrophic lateral sclerosis (ALS) in Warsaw on November 6, 1999.

== Bibliography ==
- J. Magnuski. Samochody Pancerne Wojska Polskiego 1918-1939 (Armoured Cars of the Polish Army). WiS, Wyd. 1 edition, Warsaw (1993).
- J. Magnuski. Czerwony Blitzkrieg, Wrzesien 1939: Sowieckie wojska pancerne w Polsce (Red blitzkrieg, September 1939; Soviet armoured divisions in Poland). Pelta, Wyd. 1 edition, Warsaw (1994).
- J. Magnuski. Wozy bojowe Polskich Sił Zbrojnych 1940-1946 (w: Ilustrowana encyklopedia techniki wojskowej) (Armoured vehicles of the Polish Army 1940-1946). Wydawnictwo Lampart, Warsaw (1998). ISBN 83-86776-39-0
- J. Magnuski. Wozy Bojowe LWP 1943-1983 (Armoured vehicles of the Polish People's Army). Wydawnictwo Ministerstwa Obrony Narodowej, Wyd. 1 edition, Warsaw (1985). ISBN 83-11-06990-5
- J. Magnuski. Armor in profile 1 / Pancerne profile 1. Pelta, Warsaw (1997).
- J. Magnuski. Drezyna pancerna SOK (Armoured train of the Railway Defence). Militaria Vol.1 Nr.1.
- J. Magnuski. Czołg rozpoznawczy TK-3 (TKS)(Recce tank TK-3 (TKS)). TBiU nr 36, Warsaw (1975).
- J. Magnuski. Samochód pancerny wz.34 (wz. 34 Armoured car). TBiU nr 56, Warsaw (1979).
- J. Magnuski. Pociąg Pancerny "Śmiały" w trzech wojnach. Seria "Czołgi w Boju" nr 3. (Armoured train "Śmiały" in three wars). Pelta, Warsaw (1996).
- J. Magnuski. Ciężki czołg KW. Seria "Czołgi w Boju" nr 4. (Tanks in Battle No.4:, KV Heavy Tank). Pelta, Warsaw.
- J. Magnuski. Karaluchy przeciw Panzerom (Cockroaches against the Panzers). Pelta, Warsaw (1995).
- J. Magnuski. Czołg pływający PT-76 (Amphibious tank PT-76). Warszawa (1971). TBiU 12. s. 3.
- J. Magnuski, M. Kolomijec. Rudý blitzkrieg (Red Blitzkrieg).
- J. Magnuski, Jan Jędryka. Czołg lekki 7 TP (Light tank 7-TP). Militaria Zeszyt Specjalny Vol.1 No.5 (Lektura obowiązkowa)
- J. Magnuski. Ciągnik artyleryjski C7P na podwoziu 7-TP (C7P Artillery Carrier on 7-TP chassis). Militaria Zeszyt Specjalny Vol.1 No.5
- J. Magnuski. Czołgi rozpoznawcze PZInż.-130 i PZInż.-140 (Recce tanks PZInż 380-130 and 380-140). Nowa Technika Wojskowa nr 11/93
- J. Magnuski. Czołgi Renault w Wojsku Polskim, cz. I (Renault tanks in the Polish Army). Nowa Technika Wojskowa nr 8/97
- J. Magnuski. Drezyna pancerna Tatra (Armoured draisine Tatra). Nowa Technika Wojskowa nr 1/98
- J. Magnuski. Angielski lekki czołg Vickers Mark E w polskiej służbie (British Vickers E light tank in Polish service). Nowa Technika Wojskowa nr. 5 and 6/99
- J. Magnuski. Crusader - Krzyzowiec pustyni (Crusader tank - the crusader of the desert).
- J. Magnuski. Czołg średni T-34 (Medium tank T-34). Warszawa : Wydaw. MON 1970 16 s. (Seria : Typy broni i uzbrojenia nr 1)
- J. Magnuski. Lądowe trałowce. Żołnierz Polski 1970 nr 36 s. 8-9
- J. Magnuski. Przeciw czołgom (Against the tanks). Żołnierz Polski 1970 nr 22 s. 13
- J. Magnuski. W pościgu. Ze wspomnień oficera 3 Brygady Pancernej 1 Korpusu Pancernego Wacława Szernera spisał ... (In pursuit; Memoirs). Żołnierz Polski dodatek społeczno-literacki 1970 nr 21 s. 335
- J. Magnuski. Pancerna uczelnia (Armoured University). Żołnierz Polski 1969 nr 51/52 s.
- J. Magnuski. Pancerny zwiadowca (Armoured Recon). Żołnierz Polski 1969 nr 51/52 s. 16-17
- J. Magnuski. Prezentacja BWP (bojowego wozu piechoty) (Presentation of an APC). Żołnierz Polski 1969 nr 30 s. 8-9
- J. Magnuski. T-54. Żołnierz Polski 1969 nr 15 s. 8-9
- J. Magnuski. Mój pocisku gdzie polecisz. 4 Samodzielny Pułk Czołgów na Wale Pomorskim (Oh! my bullet, where will you fly?). Żołnierz Polski 1968 nr 11 s. 4-5
- J. Magnuski. Trzecie pokolenie 1 Warszawskiej Dywizji Zmechanizowanej (The third generation of the 1 Warsaw Armoured Division). Żołnierz Polski 1968 nr 13 s. 8-9
- J. Magnuski. WPT-34. Pancerne pogotowie (WPT-34. Armoured ambulance). Żołnierz Polski 1968 nr 21 s. 10
- J. Magnuski. W Sudeckiej Pancernej (In a Sudeten Armoured). Żołnierz Polski 1968 nr 7 s. 8-10
- J. Magnuski. Żelazko na gąsienicach (PT-76) (Tracked Iron (PT-76)). Żołnierz Polski 1968 nr 27 s. 8-9
- J. Magnuski. Jak powstaje SKOT (SKOT - the making of) . Żołnierz Polski 1967 nr 47 s. 4-5
- J. Magnuski. Nawigacja pojazdów (Navigation of Vehicles). Żołnierz Polski 1967 nr 6 s. 13
- J. Magnuski. Pancerni powietrznego desantu (Armoured, Air Transportable). Żołnierz Polski 1967 nr 12 s. 4-5
- J. Magnuski. Saperzy szturmowej przeprawy (Engineers of River-crossing under Fire). Żołnierz Polski 1967 nr 27 s. 8-9
- J. Magnuski. Rycerze pancerni XX wieku (Armoured knights of the 20th century). Warszawa : Wydaw. MON 1967 200 s.
- J. Magnuski. W południe (At noon). Żołnierz Polski 1967 nr 28 s. 8-9
- J. Magnuski. Samochód nakłada pancerz (A Car Puts On an Armour). Żołnierz Polski 1966 nr 22 s. 13

== See also ==
- List of Poles
- Polish contribution to World War II
