= Edmund Roman Orlik =

Polish army officer (1918–1982)

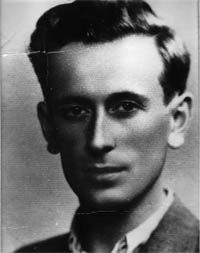
- Born: January 26, 1918; Rogoźno, Poland
- Died: April 8, 1982 (aged 64); Opole, Poland
- Military career
- Allegiance: Poland
- Branch: Polish Army (1937–1939); Armia Krajowa (1940–1944)
- Rank: podchorąży
- Unit: 71st Armored Unit
- Awards: Cross of Valour (Poland)
- Other work: architect

Edmund Roman Orlik (26 January 1918 – 8 April 1982) was a Polish architect, and World War II tank commander. During the Invasion of Poland by Nazi Germany in September 1939 he claimed to have destroyed ten German tanks, including one Panzer IV Ausf. B, the largest tank then fielded by Germany, with a 2.6 tonne TKS tankette armed with a 20mm autocannon.

== Early life ==
Orlik was born on 26 January 1918. After graduating high school he volunteered for military service and completed his training in Armoured Warfare Training Centre (Centrum Wyszkolenia Broni Pancernych) in Modlin in 1937. Then he began to study Architecture at the Warsaw Polytechnic.

== World War II ==
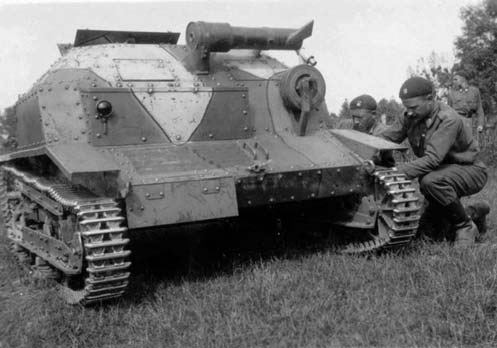
Officer cadet Orlik and his driver, Bronisław Zakrzewski, near their TKS tankette

In August 1939 he was mobilized and took part in the September Campaign in the 71st Polish Armored Squadron as a Podchorąży (officer cadet). On 18 September 1939, Orlik took part in the skirmish of Pociecha in the Kampinos Forest, in which three TKS tankettes destroyed two Panzer 35(t) and one Panzer IV German tanks, from the 1. Leichte Division.

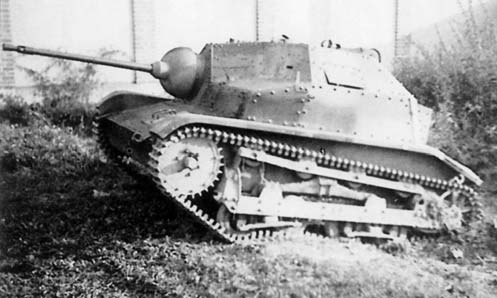
A TKS armed with a Nkm wz.38 FK 20mm autocannon, the same type commanded by Orlik

As a result of the battle the commander of the German platoon and heir to the Duchy of Racibórz, 23-year-old Silesian prince and lieutenant Viktor IV Albrecht Johannes von Ratibor, was killed. There is an established version, coming from Janusz Magnuski's works, based solely on Orlik's accounts, that only Orlik's tankette had a 20mm cannon; the others were equipped with machine-guns, and Orlik destroyed all three tanks. However, there are other sources, that all three Polish TKS were armed with 20mm cannons. Moreover, a history of Polish armoured weapons written in 1971 in London does not mention Orlik, listing three other tankette commanders in the skirmish at Pociecha out of six Polish tankers (names: Tritt, Pachocki and Łopatka).

The next day Orlik and his unit participated in the battle of Sieraków. During the night, the Germans were repelled by the Polish 9th Uhlan Regiment and 7th Mounted Rifles. However, the Germans counter-attacked with several dozen tanks from the Panzer-Regiment 11 and Panzer-Abteilung 65. During the battle, Orlik claimed to have destroyed seven tanks with his TKS and took two German tank crewmen prisoners with his service pistol. The Polish forces managed to destroy 20 tanks with artillery support. After the battle, he and his unit retreated east and took part in the Siege of Warsaw.

During the Occupation of Poland (1939–45) Orlik was a member of the Home Army.

== Post-war architectural career ==
After the war Orlik returned to his pre-war studies, after graduating from the Visual Arts College (Wyższa Szkoła Plastyczna) he was employed as an architect in Łódź. He designed the Łódź University Library, built between 1956-1960, and considered to be one of the most elaborate architectural work in the city during the Polish People's Republic era. Orlik also designed the dormitory for foreign students (nicknamed the Tower of Babel) and the Department of Foreign Languages building. He eventually completed his architectural studies at the Wrocław University of Technology and from the beginning of the 1970s, resided and worked in Opole.

== Death ==
He died by car accident on 8 April 1982.

== Memorial ==
In Pociecha, where the battle was fought, a memorial stone dedicated to Orlik was erected. (Located at 52°20′02″N 20°44′15″E).

== Awards ==
Cross of Valour (Poland)

== Popular culture references ==
In the video game World of Tanks, the Orlik's Medal is awarded for destroying two or more enemy tanks or tank destroyers with a light tank. The targets must be at least one tier higher than the player's tank. The game also features the TKS as a playable vehicle.
