= Nkm wz. 38 FK =

nkm wz. 38 FK
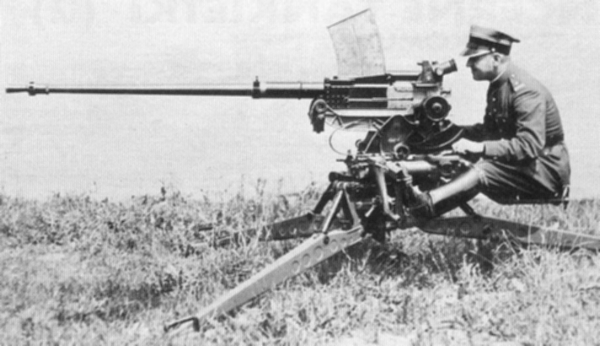
- The gun in light infantry configuration
- Type: Anti-air and anti-tank heavy machine gun/autocannon
- Place of origin: Poland

Service history
- In service: 1938–1939
- Used by: Poland
- Wars: World War II

Production history
- Designer: Wawrzyniec Lewandowski
- Designed: 1938
- Manufacturer: Państwowa Fabryka Karabinów
- Unit cost: zl30,000 (tank version)
- Produced: 1938–1939
- No. built: 55

Specifications
- Mass: 57.6 kilograms (127 lb)
- Length: 2,015 millimetres (79.3 in)
- Barrel length: 1,476 millimetres (58.1 in)
- Width: 202.5 millimetres (7.97 in)
- Crew: 3 (PL 20A mount)/ 6 (PL 20B mount)
- Shell: 20x138mmB
- Shell weight: 320g
- Caliber: 20 mm
- Action: blowback
- Rate of fire: 320-350 rpm
- Muzzle velocity: 856 metres per second (2,810 ft/s)
- Effective firing range: 5,000 metres (5,500 yd)/7,000 metres (7,700 yd)
- Feed system: box(5/10 rounds)/drum(15/100 rounds)

The nkm wz. 38 FK (Polish military acronym meaning heaviest machine gun pattern 1938) was a 20 mm heavy machine gun (autocannon by modern terminology) produced in inter-war Poland. It was used both in anti-air and anti-tank role and was also adapted for tank use and mounted on some TKS tankettes. Mass-produced since 1938, it was used extensively during the Polish Defensive War of 1939.

== Name ==
In line with other arms design of the time, the nkm wz. 38 FK was a code-name rather than a proper name of the weapon. The nkm acronym stands for Polish: najcięższy karabin maszynowy, literally the heaviest machine gun (i.e. heavier than standard contemporary heavy machine guns using standard rifle cartridges such as the 7.92 Mauser, .303 British or 7.62×54mmR). The second part of the name, wz. 38 stands for wzór 38, that is Mark 1938, referring to the year the weapon was submitted to the military for testing or the year the weapon was designed. Finally, when more than one weapon of certain type was conceived in the same year, additional designation was added at the end to differentiate between various types. In this case the FK stood for Fabryka Karabinów, the Warsaw-based state-owned rifle factory.

== History ==
=== Origins ===
In early 1930s the Polish Army was looking for a modern anti-tank and anti-air weapon to replace outdated World War I equipment still in use. In 1931 heavy machine guns made by Hotchkiss, Solothurn and Oerlikon were tested, but were found unsuitable for Polish needs. Most importantly, they could not suit both AT and AA roles well. In 1937 another commission was sent abroad to test the newly designed weapons of 20mm calibre by Oerlikon, Madsen and Hispano-Suiza. As all designs had several flaws, it was decided to start works on an indigenous design. Engineer Bolesław Jurek of Warsaw-based Fabryka Karabinów company became the lead designer.

Four designs were considered for the wz 38FK, dubbed Models A-D, from which only the Model A would become adopted;

Model A - heavy machine gun designed by Bolesław Jurek. Adopted by the Polish Army in 1939. Automatic self-repeating weapon. Operating on the principle of short barrel recoil. It had an easily replaceable barrel with a muzzle brake. It is fed from a box magazine with a capacity of 5 or 10 rounds or a drum magazine with a capacity of 15 rounds. It is mounted in the tank with a spherical yoke with an armored cover developed by Napiórkowski and Miniewski.

Model B - prototype of a heavy machine gun developed by W. Lewandowski. A gas operated design which utilised a gas port in the barrel. Fed from a cloth or metal link belt or from a box magazine.

Model C - prototype of a heavy machine gun developed by S. Rytwiński and W. Lewandowski. Operation as the Model B HMG. Fed via 200 round cloth or metallic belt, box magazine for 5-10 rounds or drum magazine with capacity of 100 rounds. A PL20A tripod base was designed for the use of the gun as an anti-tank infantry weapon. The tripod was made according to J. Skrzypiński's design and developed by L.Kowalewicz. In this version, the HMG was to be equipped with a lighter barrel and 5 round box magazine. A heavier PC20A wheeled mount would be used for the weapon when equipped at higher tactical levels.The mount had a weight of 400–500 kg and was developed by L. Kowalewicz. It was predicted that the HMG could be used for arming aircraft.

Model D - prototype heavy machine gun developed by Bolesław Jurek. Works like Model B. Powered by a 100-round drum magazine. Could be used for arming aircraft.

A first batch of 100 Model A HMGs was ordered on August 26, 1938. The gun was produced by Sanok-based Zieleniewski company, with barrels made by Pruszków-based Zakłady Przemysłowe Stowarzyszenia Mechaników Polskich z Ameryki works and newly designed ammunition at the State Munition Works in Skarżysko-Kamienna. In April 1939 another 140 pieces were ordered, 40 of those as stationary weapons (without mountings) and with time the production was to reach 100 pieces a month.

However, the initial costs were high. The design itself, factory equipment and the guns of the first batch themselves cost roughly 2.2 million złotys. The plans for budget year 1939/1940 amounted to almost 3.4 million. In addition, the initial batch was being manufactured at a much slower rate than expected. Because of that by the outbreak of World War II out of 896 pieces ordered for delivery by 1940 only 55 pieces were delivered to the Polish Army.

=== Usage ===
The nkm wz. 38 FK was accepted by the Polish Army in 1939. As a stop-gap solution roughly 30 TK-3 and TKS tankettes were rearmed with this HMG. As an anti-tank and anti-air weapon, the gun was to be used extensively: 8 pieces in AA configuration for every infantry division.

However, as of September 1, 1939 the overall production did not exceed 60 pieces.

== Penetration Capacity ==
- Penetration Capacity:

Distance (m)	Thickness (mm)
Hardened Steel
100	20
200	18
300	17
400	15
500	13
Steel
300	25
400	23
500	20

Note: Capable of penetrating any German tank of 1939 except for possibly Panzer IV. The more recently provided photos show that the tank driven by Prince Wiktor IV Albrecht von Ratibor, destroyed by Mr. Cadet Roman Orlik, was indeed a Panzer IV and not a Panzer 35(t).

== See also ==
- TKS Polish tankettes
- Polsten
