= TKS =

Polish tankette

TK-3 / TKS
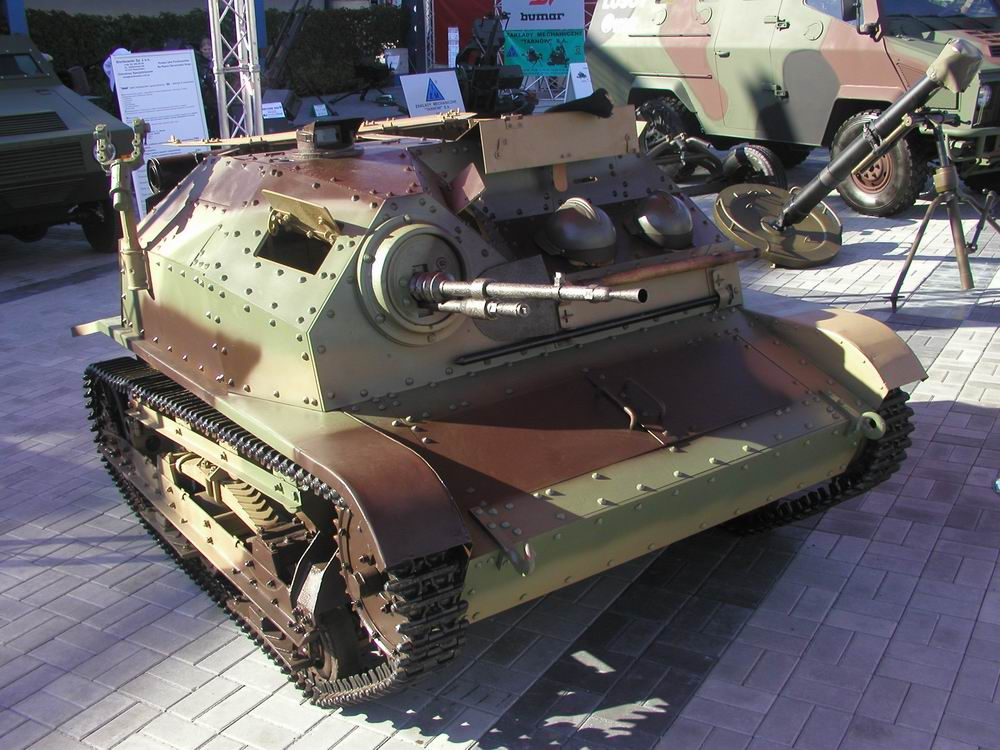
- TKS tankette
- Type: Tankette
- Place of origin: Poland

Production history
- Manufacturer: Fabryka Samochodów PZInż.
- Produced: 1931–1939
- No. built: 575

Specifications
- Mass: 2.43 / 2.6 tonnes (2.39 / 2.56 long tons; 2.68 / 2.87 short tons)
- Length: 2.58 metres (8 ft 6 in)
- Width: 1.78 metres (5 ft 10 in)
- Height: 1.32 metres (4 ft 4 in)
- Crew: 2 (gunner, driver)
- Armor: 4–10 mm (0.16–0.39 in)
- Main armament: 7.92 mm Ckm wz.25 Hotchkiss machine gun 2000 rounds
- Engine: Ford A / Polski FIAT-122 petrol engine 40 / 46 hp (30 / 34 kW)
- Power/weight: 17 / 18 hp/tonne (13 / 13 kW/tonne)
- Suspension: Bogie suspension
- Fuel capacity: 70+8 l
- Operational range: 200 km (120 mi) (roads), 100 km (62 mi) (cross-country)
- Maximum speed: 40–46 km/h (25–29 mph)

The TK (TK-3) and TKS were Polish tankettes developed during the 1930s and used in the Second World War.

== Design and development ==
The TK (also known as the TK-3) tankette was a Polish design produced from 1931 based on the chassis of the British Carden Loyd tankette, with an improved hull and more powerful engine, and armour up to 8 mm (0.31 in) thick (10 mm or 0.39 in on the TKS). In 1939, up-arming of the tankettes with nkm wz. 38 FK 20 mm (0.79 in) autocannons began, but only 24 of these were completed before the outbreak of World War II.

On 6 November 1934 Estonia purchased 6 vehicles from Poland, with the contract deal worth over 180 000 krones. The deal also included one additional tracked-lorry, and a motorcycle was given free as a bonus. After the Soviet Union occupied Estonia, these vehicles were put into service with the Red Army.

== Combat history ==
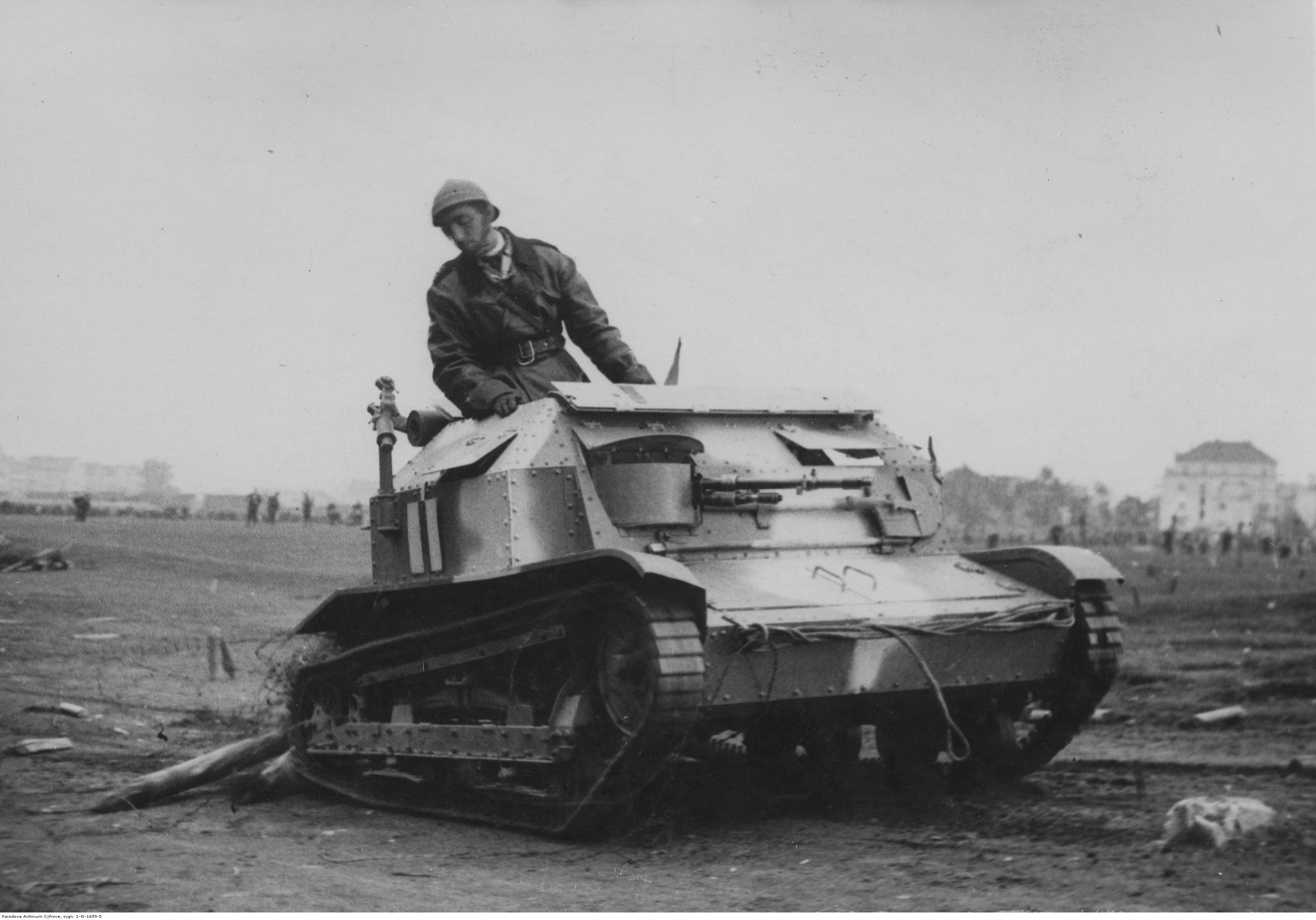
TK prototype nr. 6007 in its final form with roof hatches open. According to the TK-3 standard (it might be a rebuilt TK-2). Note a horizontal angle of MG fire and two side observation hatches, present in early series TK-3 only.

575 TK/TKS tankettes formed the bulk of the Polish armoured forces before the outbreak of war. They suffered heavy losses during the invasion of Poland, often being the only armoured fighting vehicles available. Their small size suited them for reconnaissance and infantry support, but with their light armament of a single machine gun they stood no chance in combat against German tanks, except against the Panzer I.

The handful of tankettes armed with 20 mm guns were more effective against enemy tanks; in one instance on 18 September 1939 a 20 mm gunned TKS commanded by Podchorąży (officer cadet) Roman Orlik destroyed two German Panzer 35(t) tanks and a Panzer IV ausf B tank which was commanded by Victor IV Albrecht von Ratibor.

After the conquest of Poland, captured tankettes were used by the German army in various support roles, mostly for training, security duties or as artillery tractors. Many captured tankettes were also used by the Luftwaffe for airfield security and snowplowing. Some were later sold to the puppet state of Croatia. In spring 1941, the National Police received 18 TK-3 tankettes, some with the 20mm gun, while in summer 1941 the Army received 18 TKS, 4 of them being sent to the Ustashe Militia.

A smaller Polish force retreated to (then neutral) Hungary from the German and Soviet troops occupying Poland. This mixed formation had 30 tracked vehicles, of which 15–20 were TKS (contemporary sources did not officially distinguish between TK-3 and TKS). These vehicles were used for training in tank driving and machine gun handling drills. By the end of the war, they were worn out due to the lack of spare parts, so there is no trace of them after early 1944. The crew was able to travel to England with the help of the Hungarian government in 1940.

== Variants ==
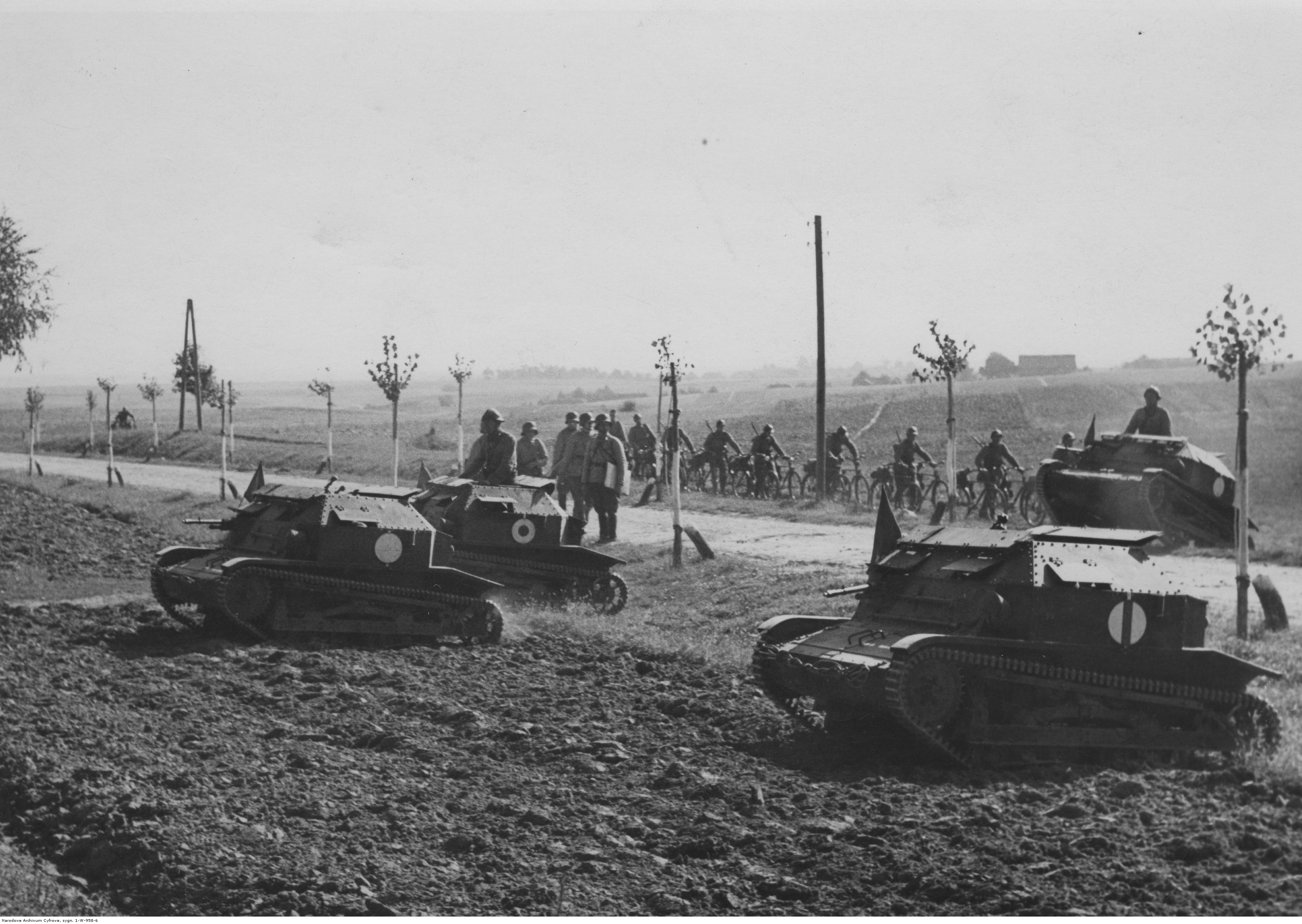
TK-3 tankettes during field exercises, 1938.

- TK (TK-3) – from 1931, about 280 built (Ford A engine)
- TKF – TK tankette with 46 hp (34 kW) Polski Fiat engine and new (TKS-type) suspension, about 18 built
- TKS – improved model of 1933, about 260 built (new hull, suspension, Polski Fiat engine)
- TKS with nkm wz. 38 FK – about 24 TKS fitted with 20 mm autocannon in 1939.
- C2P – unarmoured light artillery tractor, about 200 built.

Experimental models:

- TK-1, TK-2 – first prototypes
- TKD – light self propelled gun with 47 mm gun, four made.
- TKW – light reconnaissance tank with turret, one prototype made.
- TK-3 with 20 mm gun – only one prototype with a modified hull was completed.
- TKS-D – light tank destroyer with 37 mm Bofors anti-tank gun, two made

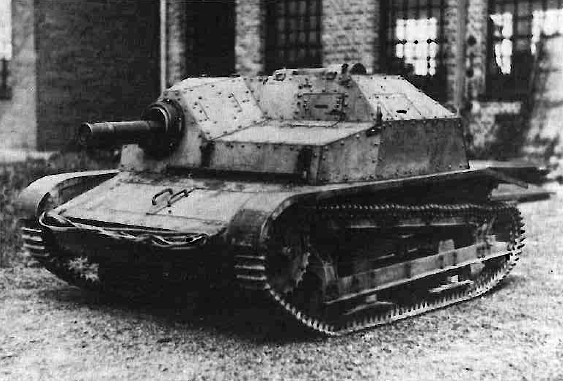
The TKS prototype nr. 1160 – note the TK-3 suspension, Ckm wz.30 (Browning) machine gun, a high muffler and lack of a periscope.

== List of registration numbers ==
A list of registration numbers (might be incomplete):

- 1143–52 – Carden-Loyd Mk.VI (10 tanks)
- 1154–68 – "iron" TK-3 (15 tanks)
  - 1156–59 – rebuilt to TKD SP-guns
  - 1160 – rebuilt to TKS prototype
  - 1164 – rebuilt to TKW prototype
- 1169–1353 – TK-3 (185 tanks)
  - 1221 – rebuilt to TKF prototype
- 1362–1461 – TK-3 (200 tanks), possibly including TKF
- 1492–1511 – "iron" TKS of pre-production series (20 tanks)
  - 1510 – rebuilt to TKS-B prototype, than to TKS-D tank destroyer
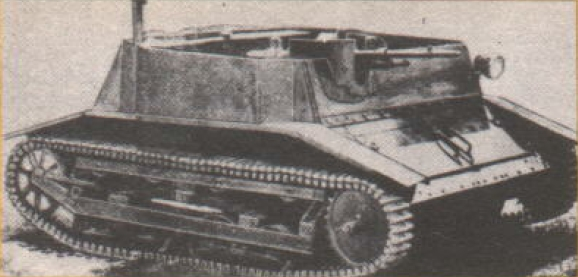
- Tk1
  1512–94 – TKS (83 tanks, of these 6 sold to Estonia)
- 1597–1682 – TKS (85 tanks)
- 1702–64 – TKS (63 tanks)
- 1799–1814 – TKS (16 tanks)
- 6006 – TK-1 prototype
- 6007 – TK-3 prototype
- 6008 – TK-2 prototype
- Some from among 8890–8910 range – TKS (14 tanks?)
  - 8897 – rebuilt to TKS-D tank destroyer
  - 8898 – C2P tractor prototype

== Users ==
- Poland
- Estonia
- Independent State of Croatia
- Nazi Germany
- Soviet Union
- Kingdom of Romania (possibly)

== Surviving TK-series tankettes ==
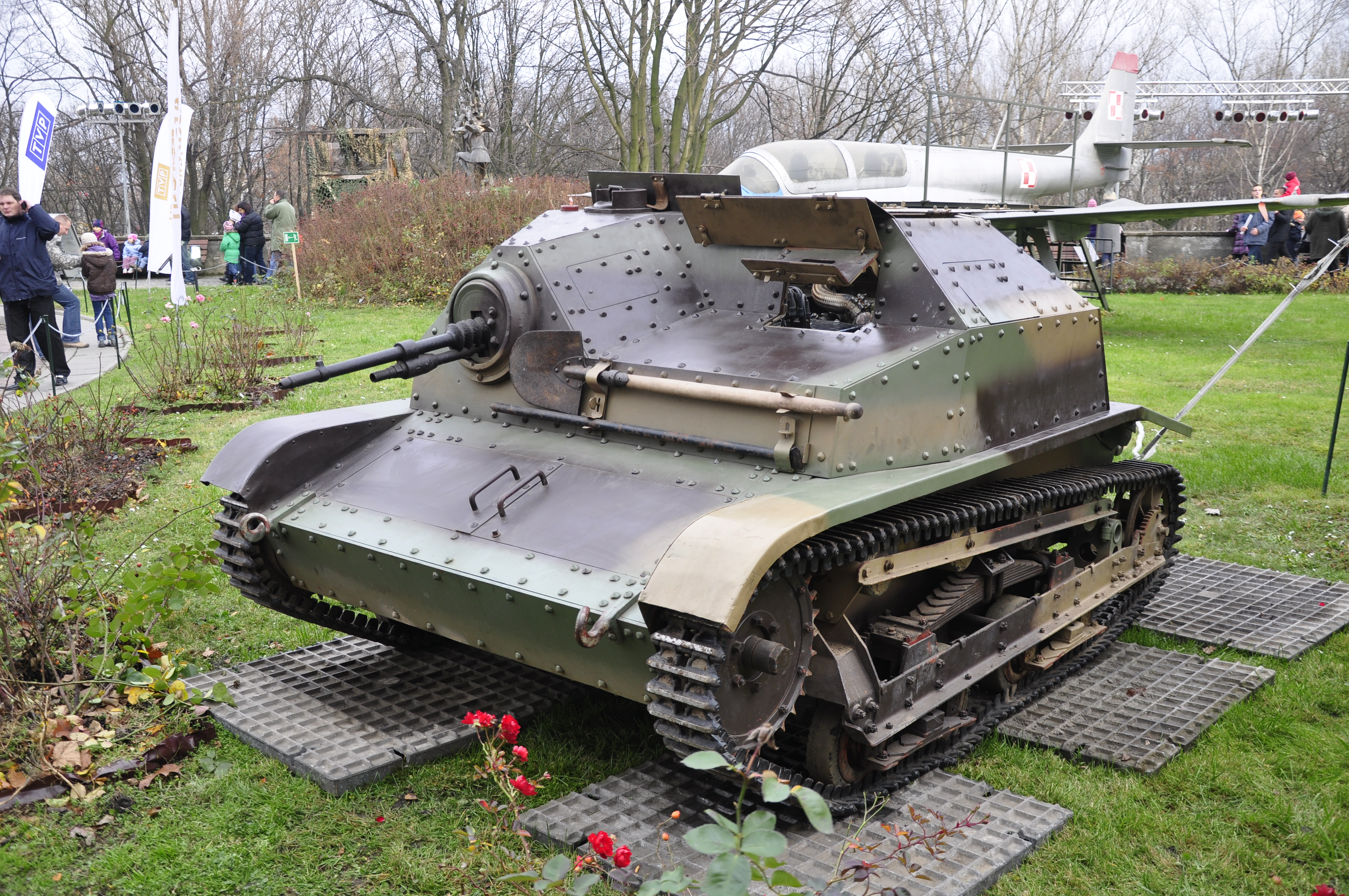
TKS tankette in the Polish Army Museum

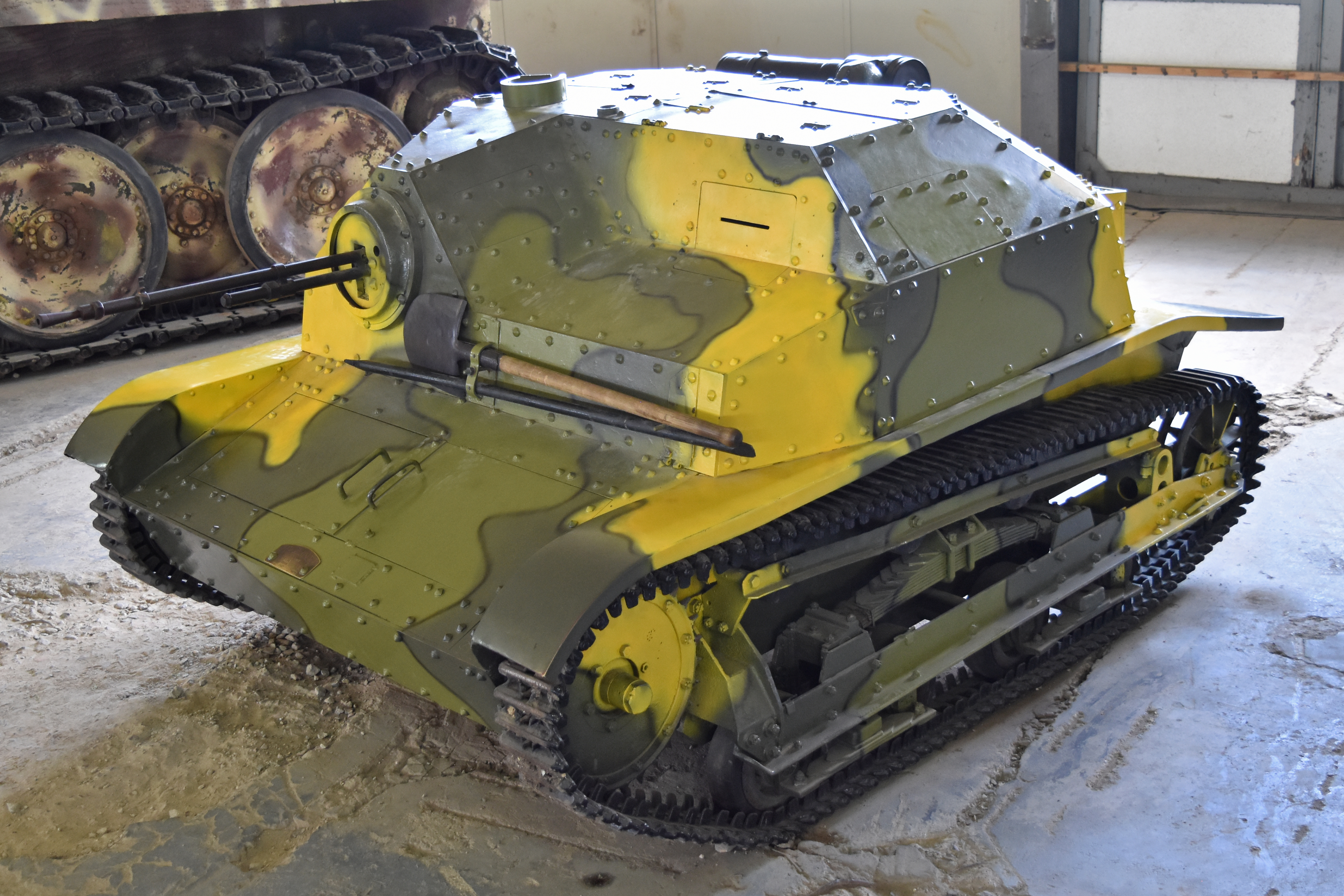
TKS tankette in Kubinka Tank Museum

There are only two fully operational TKS tankettes and one TK-3 surviving. All of them were reconstructed from wrecks in the first decade of 21st century, using non-original parts.

- 1 TKS – One of the TKS tankettes was donated to Poland by the Swedish Axvall Tank Museum and since 2008 it is on exhibition in the Museum of the Polish Army. The Swedish TKS survived the post-war period in Norway, where it was operated by a local farmer as a tractor.
- 1 TKS – Private collection.
- 1 TK-3 – Private collection.

The other survivors are not in working order.

- 1 TKS – On exhibition in the Kubinka Tank Museum in Russia.
- 1 TKF – On exhibition in the Military Museum in Belgrade.
- 1 TKS – Returned from the Norwegian Armed Forces museum to the Armoured Weapon Museum in Poznan, Poland.
- 1 C2P artillery tractor – Was found in Belgium and bought by the National Military History Center of Auburn, Indiana, where it was on exhibition until the center closed in 2019. Its whereabouts are currently unknown.

== Gallery ==
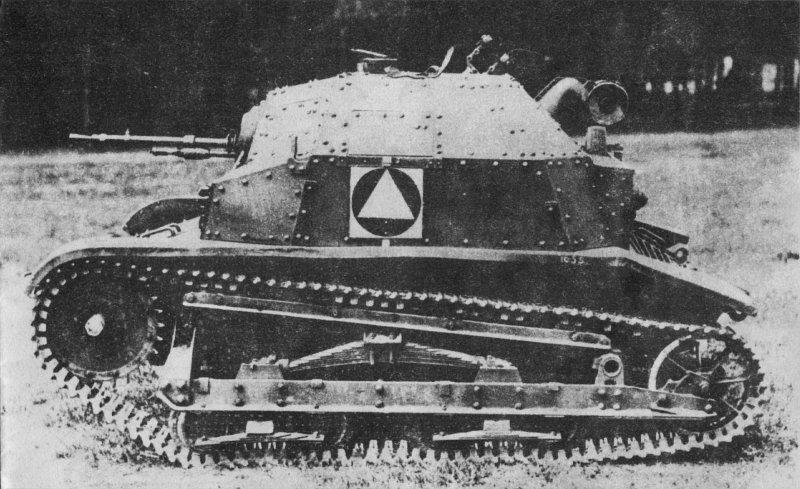
TKS

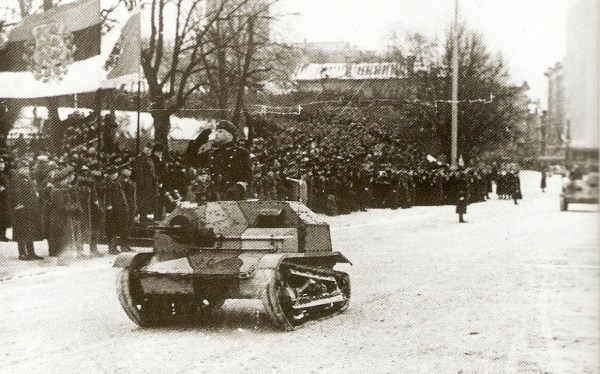
Estonian TKS tankettes on the republic's anniversary parade on 24 February 1937.

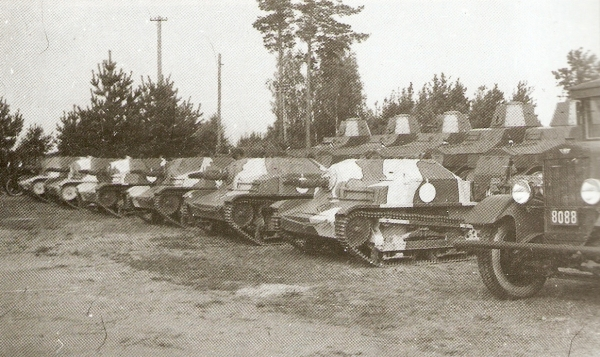
Estonian TKS tankettes

== Comparable vehicles ==
- Czechoslovakia Tančík vz. 33 and AH-IV
- France Renault UE2
- Italy: L3/33 • L3/35
- Japan: Type 94
- Romania: R-1
- Soviet Union: T-27 • T-37A • T-38
- Sweden: Strv m/37
- United Kingdom: Carden Loyd tankette

== Bibliography ==
- "Czołg rozpoznawczy TK-S", Militaria i Fakty nr. 31 (6/2005)
- Adam Jońca, Rajmund Szubański, Jan Tarczyński, "Wrzesień 1939 - Pojazdy Wojska Polskiego - Barwa i broń"; WKiŁ; Warsaw 1990. ISBN 83-206-0847-3
- Leszek Komuda, "Przeciwpancerne tankietki" in: "Militaria" Year 1 Nr. 3 and Nr. 4.
- Janusz Magnuski, "Czołg rozpoznawczy TKS (TK)"; TBiU-Typy broni i uzbrojenia series nr. 36; Wydawnictwo MON; Warsaw 1975
- Janusz Magnuski, "Karaluchy przeciw panzerom"; Pelta; Warsaw 1995
- Eesti soomusmasinad : soomusautod ja tankid 1918-1940 / Tiit Noormets, Mati Õun Tallinn : Tammiskilp, 1999 Page 52 ISBN 9985-60-692-2
- Jan Tarczyński, K. Barbarski, A. Jońca, "Pojazdy w Wojsku Polskim - Polish Army Vehicles - 1918-1939"; Ajaks; Pruszków 1995.
- Zbigniew Lalak, "Czołg rozpoznawczy TK3 / Reconnaissance tank TK3" in Z. Lalak, T. Basarabowicz, R. Sawicki, M. Skotnicki, P. Żurkowski "Pojazdy II wojny swiatowej (tom 2) / Military Vehicles of WW2, part 2", Warsaw 2004, ISBN 83-920361-0-7
