= C2P =

Polish light artillery tractor

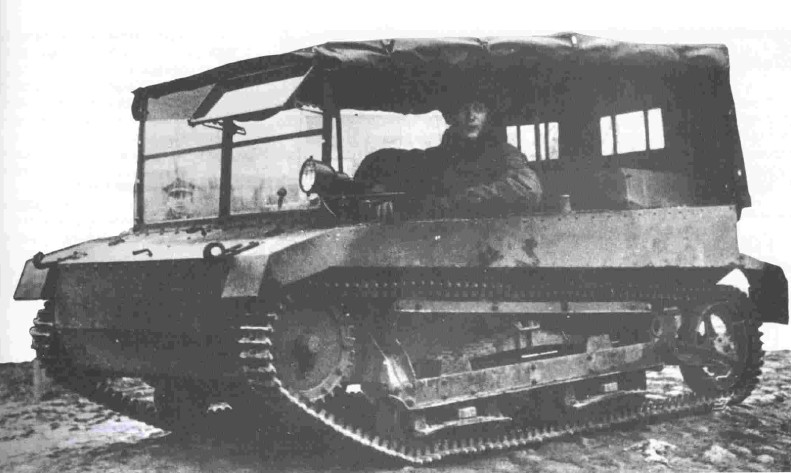
- C2P artillery tractor
- Type: artillery tractor
- Place of origin: Second Polish Republic

Service history
- In service: 1937-1945
- Used by: Second Polish Republic, Nazi Germany
- Wars: World War II

Production history
- Designer: Janusz Łapuszewski
- Designed: 1933
- Manufacturer: Państwowe Zakłady Inżynierii
- Unit cost: zl 33,000
- Produced: 1937-1939
- No. built: 196-310
- Variants: TKS-D

Specifications (C2P plus 40 mm Bofors in tow)
- Mass: 2,750 kg (6,060 lb)
- Length: 2.85 m (9 ft 4 in)
- Width: 1.82 m (6 ft 0 in)
- Height: 1.65 m (5 ft 5 in)
- Crew: 1
- Passengers: 3
- Engine: 6-cylinder Fiat 122B (PZInż 367) petrol 46 hp (34 kW) at 2,600 rpm
- Power/weight: 16.7 hp/ton
- Suspension: Bogie on leaf spring, four rubber-tyred wheels each side
- Ground clearance: 30 cm (12 in)
- Fuel capacity: 70 L (18 US gal)
- Operational range: 150 km (93 mi) on road 110 km (68 mi) off-road
- Maximum speed: 40 km/h (25 mph) on road 20 km/h (12 mph) off-road

C2P was a Polish light artillery tractor. Designed in the 1930s, it was the basic tractor of Polish anti-aircraft artillery during the 1939 Nazi and Soviet invasion of Poland. There are only two surviving vehicles, both in private hands in Poland.

== Development ==
The origins of the design can be traced to the Carden Loyd tankette of the 1920s. In 1929 Poland bought 10 or 11 Mark VI tankettes with a licence for their production, and used them for development of their own TK tankette series. In October 1931 Polish General Staff expressed interest in a small, highly mobile artillery tractor intended for 75 mm field guns in Polish service at the time. In 1932 Janusz Łapuszewski and A. Schmidt of the BBTBP institute ("Armoured Forces Technical Study Bureau") designed a small, fully tracked artillery tractor based on TK-3 tankette. It was designed to tow 40 mm Bofors anti-aircraft guns, but could also tow other light and medium artillery used by the Polish Army, such as the modernised 75 mm Schneider guns and 100 mm Skoda howitzers. For heavier guns it was to be eventually replaced in Polish service with the PZInż 343 wheeled tractor, but only a couple of these were completed before the war.

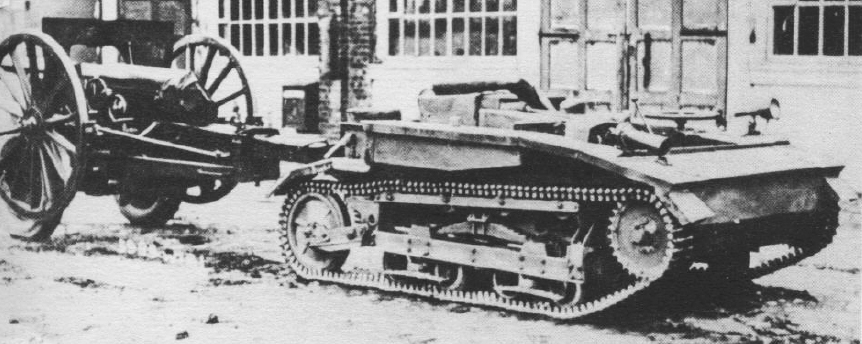
Prototype of the C2P tractor after the second round of tests

Initially designated C2T (Ciągnik 2-tonowy, "Trailer, 2-Tonne"), the design looked promising and the following year the first prototype was constructed by the PZInż works. The original C2P design was basically a TK-3 tankette razee: it included all elements of the undercarriage and traction system, with the armoured fighting compartment removed and replaced with a simple open cockpit with seating for four crew members: one driver and three passengers. The prototype was completed on 1 July 1933 and included some modifications to the Carden Loyd suspension designed for the TKS tankette.

The prototype was a promising vehicle. The design, to some extent similar to French Renault UE tractors, was nevertheless both more advanced, more reliable and faster than its French counterpart. During trials it was discovered that in ideal conditions the C2P could tow a 40 mm Bofors anti-aircraft gun at a speed of 30 to 40 km/h (19 to 25 mph) on a good road, and that similar speeds were achieved during cross-country trials. Earlier C4P tractors were significantly slower, towing the guns at 12 km/h (7.5 mph).

However, it was discovered that the rear of the vehicle was overloaded and that the vehicle's manoeuvrability was far from satisfactory. To counter the first problem, the rear tension wheels were enlarged, equipped with leaf springs and lowered to the ground, thus converting them to driving wheels. The problem with steering the tractor under heavy load was eventually solved by adding two steering clutches to both sides of the suspension system. The latter modification in 1938 was included also in the development of the TKS tankette (in the TKS-B variant). However, by then the serial production of TKS was stopped and in the end the C2P's undercarriage remained distinctive. However, as both designs were being developed simultaneously at the same facility, both were supervised by Rudolf Gundlach and their designers sometimes referred to the C2P as "ciągnik TKS" (TKS tractor), some sources call C2P a development version of TKS, which is not entirely true.

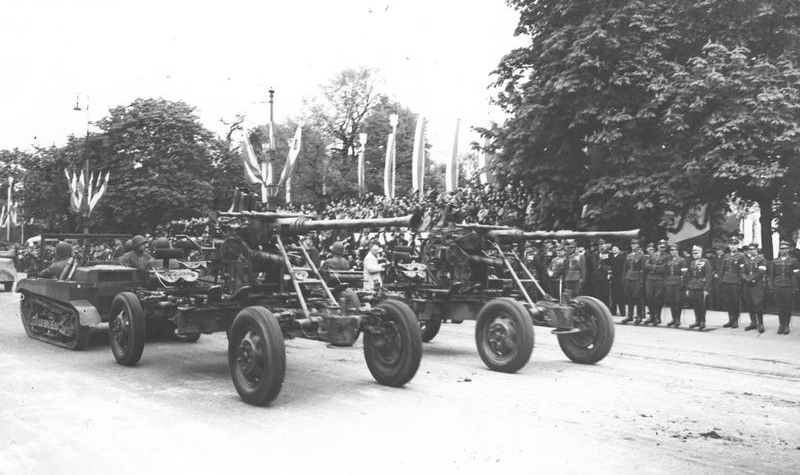
C2P tractors towing the 40 mm Bofors guns during the May 3rd Constitution Day parade of 1939

After the second round of trials the prototype was also equipped with a simple windshield and a folding tarpaulin roof to protect the crew from rain or snow. On 20 January 1936 the prototype left the PZInż factory for the third round of road tests. The vehicle spent the best part of February travelling across Poland with a 75 mm gun attached. In June and July the tests were resumed, this time with a 1,480 kg (3,260 lb) fuel trailer, and again in September, towing the new Bofors 40 mm gun (Polish designation wz. 36 Bofors). Altogether the prototype covered over 4,000 km (2,500 miles) without a serious malfunction. On 15 February 1937 the trials ended and the C2P was proposed for serial production.

== Production ==
Serial production was started in 1937 at the F-1 factory of the PZInż holding at Czechowice near Warsaw. The C2P replaced TKS on the production lines, which meant that the production could start quickly, as both vehicles shared many components. According to newest research, until September 1939 no less than 316 were delivered to the Polish Army (earlier publications gave smaller figures). An additional 117 were on order, to be completed from December 1939 to 1940.

== Operational history ==
Although initially designed for field artillery, in the end all C2P tractors were attached to anti-aircraft artillery units as the primary vehicle for towing the Bofors 40 mm gun, two for every gun: one towed the gun itself, the other towed an ammo caisson carrying 400 shells. Both trailers also carried the gun's crew of 5 (plus two drivers), as well as up to 160 shells. 292 tractors were used in regular units (with 31 A-type four-gun batteries and 11 B-type two-gun batteries).

== Variants ==
In 1936 two C2P tractors served as the basis for the TKS-D tank destroyer prototypes.

== Users ==
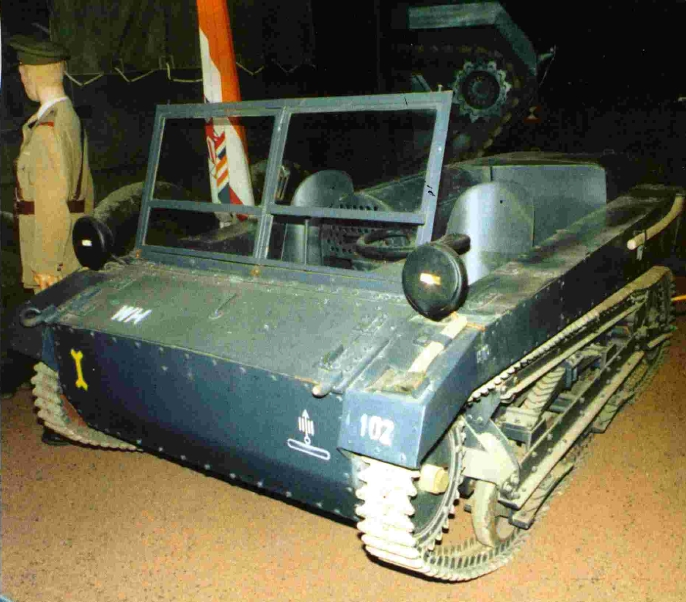
One of two surviving C2P tractors (in German camouflage)

The C2P tractor was primarily used by the Polish Army. A number of C2P tractors were captured by the invading Wehrmacht and were pressed into German service under the designation of Artillerie Schlepper C2P(p) ("artillery tractor, C2P, Polish").

== See also ==
- Universal Carrier – (United Kingdom)
- M29 Weasel – (United States)
- Komsomolets armored tractor – (Soviet Union)
- Raupenschlepper, Ost – (Nazi Germany)
- Renault UE – (France)
