= Experimental Mechanized Force =

Experimental Mechanised Force/Armoured Force
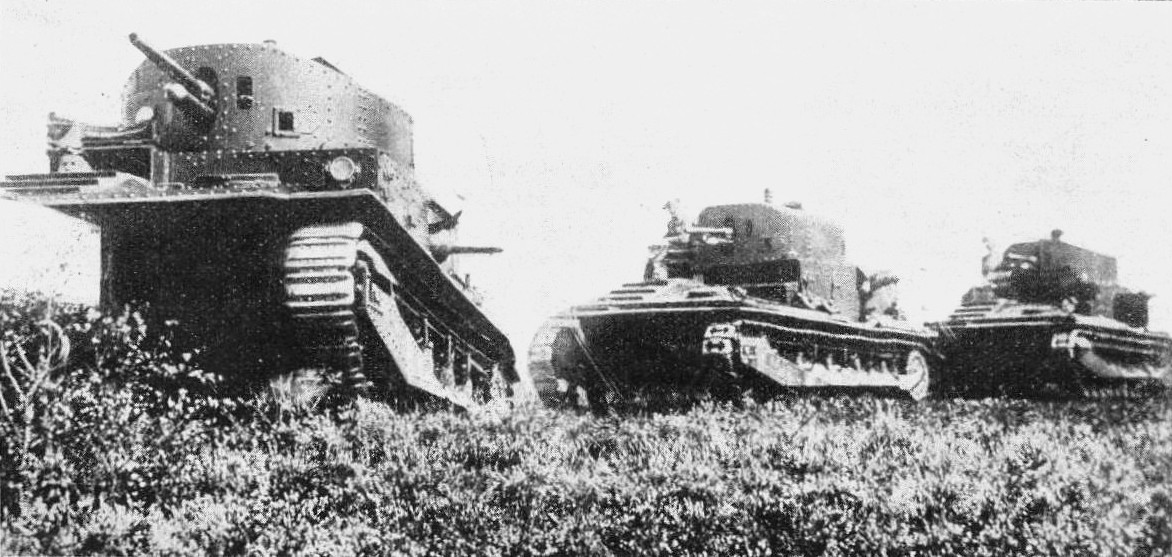
- Vickers Medium tanks on the move in England in the 1930s
- Active: 1927–1929
- Disbanded: 1929
- Country: United Kingdom
- Branch: Army
- Type: Armoured
- Role: Research
- Size: Brigade
- Equipment: Tanks and other armoured vehicles

Commanders
- Notable commanders: Robert Collins (1927–1928); Charles Broad (1931); George Lindsay (1934); Percy Hobart (1st Tank Brigade, 1934–1937)

The Experimental Mechanised Force (EMF) was a brigade-sized formation of the British Army. It was officially formed on 1 May 1927 to investigate and develop the techniques and equipment required for armoured warfare and was the first armoured formation of its kind in the world. It was renamed the Armoured Force the following year. The Royal Air Force (RAF) took part in the exercises and demonstrated the value of ground–air co-operation.

For two years the EMF participated in exercises which demonstrated the capabilities of mechanised forces against traditionally organised and trained infantry and cavalry. The force was controversial in the army and was disbanded in February 1929. The EMF and AF were followed by experiments with a Tank Brigade in 1931, which had three mixed battalions of medium and light tanks and a battalion of Carden Loyd machine-gun carriers for reconnaissance.

== Armoured warfare theory ==
In the aftermath of the First World War, several theorists sought ways to avoid a repetition of trench warfare, despite the war of movement from August to December 1914 costing the French c. 850,000 casualties and the Germans c. 670,000. The trench warfare that followed had been less costly in men but attrition warfare was indecisive; limited objective attacks, under an umbrella of massed artillery-fire, could succeed but only at the cost of unlimited duration. In 1918, fighter-bombers had been attached to the Tank Corps, bombing and machine-gunning positions blocking the advance. The weight of air attack had not been sufficient to overcome German resistance and the Tank Corps had still needed to pause until artillery caught up with the advance. Lieutenant-Colonel Percy Hobart transferred to the Tank Corps in 1923 and became something of an armoured warfare theorist, anticipating that faster tanks, self-propelled guns and much more support from RAF bombers, would allow an advance to move beyond the range of artillery.

Major-General George Lindsay had been in command of armoured cars in Iraq and seen the effect of air support, which left him with an interest in armoured operations. Lindsay thought that the war of the future would be "the Mechanised force on the ground working with the Mechanised force in the air". Trafford Leigh-Mallory, commander of the School of Army Co-operation from 1927 to 1930, promoted the new thinking. Colonel J. F. C. Fuller, Chief of Staff of the Tank Corps during the First World War and Chief instructor at the Staff College, Camberley in the 1920s, proposed an all-tank force, which would operate independently against enemy headquarters and lines of communication. Basil Liddell Hart, a retired officer, journalist and writer on military theory, advocated mechanised forces of all arms, able to carry out operations of war other than the all-out offensive. (Note: On half pay from 1924, Liddell Hart retired from the Army in 1927.) Major Giffard LeQuesne Martel, at the Experimental Bridging Establishment, a former staff officer to Fuller, designed armoured vehicles as a sideline and proposed that tanks should be subordinated to infantry formations, while many cavalry officers maintained that the horse still had a part to play on a modern battlefield, despite the evidence of Western Front in the First World War.

== Formation of the EMF ==
=== Experimental Force ===
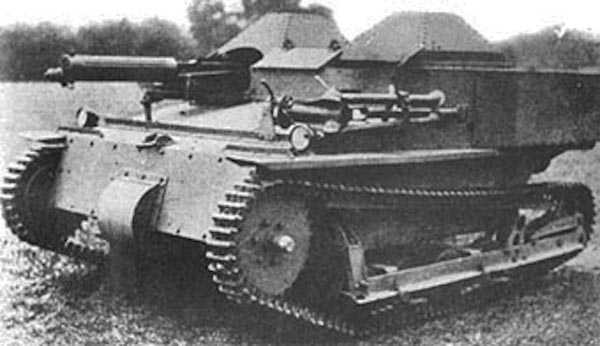
The Carden Loyd tankette Mk VI gave mobility to the Vickers machine gun

During the early 1920s, Japan had been considered the most likely military threat to the British Empire. Britain signed the Locarno Treaties in 1925 in accepting a responsibility with France, Germany and Belgium, militarily to intervene if one power attacked any of the others but no military forces were committed by the guarantors to enforce the treaties and their language was deliberately vague. The size of the British Empire made it difficult for the Army to plan equipment and training, since it might have to fight in diverse terrains and climates needing different types of equipment and organisation. The Cardwell Reforms of 1868–1874 had linked the metropolitan army battalions with those on overseas service but this tended to reduce British-based units to training and reinforcement cadres.

In September 1925 the army held its biggest exercise since 1914, part of which was to test new thinking on mechanised warfare. Three infantry divisions, one cavalry brigade and a tank battalion under the command of General Philip Chetwode exercised against an infantry division, two cavalry brigades and a tank brigade commanded by General Alexander Godley. On day 1, Godley formed a mobile force with the cavalry brigades, a motorised infantry brigade and artillery to attack part of the Chetwode force. The infantry disembarked from their lorries 7–10 mi (11–16 km) from their jumping-off points and took too long to arrive. The cavalry horses, also carried on lorries, got mixed up with the infantry transport. On day 3, Chetwode sent his tank battalion on a 30 mi (48 km) outflanking manoeuvre but his infantry divisions failed to pin down Godley's units which were easily able to retreat. The exercises showed that the British had much of the equipment necessary for mechanised and armoured warfare but not the theoretical framework to make them effective.

The Secretary of State for War, Sir Laming Worthington-Evans announced in March 1926 the formation of an experimental all-arms force. In February 1926, General George Milne, the General Officer Commanding (GOC) Eastern Command became the Chief of the Imperial General Staff (CIGS). Milne was suspicious of German intentions, circulated reports on German military potential and began to plan an army capable of resisting German aggression, despite post-war cuts in the Army Estimates. Continental warfare would need expensive equipment of little use in other parts of the world, where British commitments had increased since 1914. Following vacillation by the War Office and pressure from Fuller and Lindsay, the Inspector of the Royal Tank Corps, Milne arranged for the formation of the Experimental Mechanised Force in May 1927. Milne was already inclined against the pure tank theorists and organised the force as a balanced, all-arms command, which amounted to a prototype armoured division, as far as resources allowed.

Fuller was considered for appointment as commander of the force, combined with command of the 7th Infantry Brigade (Brigadier Robert Collins) and the administrative responsibilities connected with the garrison of Tidworth Camp. In what became known as the Tidworth Affair, Fuller turned down the appointment and resigned from the Army, because the War Office refused to allot extra staff to assist him. Fuller believed he would be unable to devote himself to the force, its methods and tactics. Liddell Hart wrote an article in the 22 April edition of The Daily Telegraph alleging that the Army was reneging on its commitment to assemble an experimental force. The article galvanised the Army into action and a public commitment to the force. Collins, a light infantry man, was appointed to command the Experimental Force in April 1927. The Experimental Force was established on 1 May 1927 at Tidworth Camp on Salisbury Plain; after unit training with the new equipment that summer, training of the force as a unit began on 19 August.

=== Royal Air Force ===
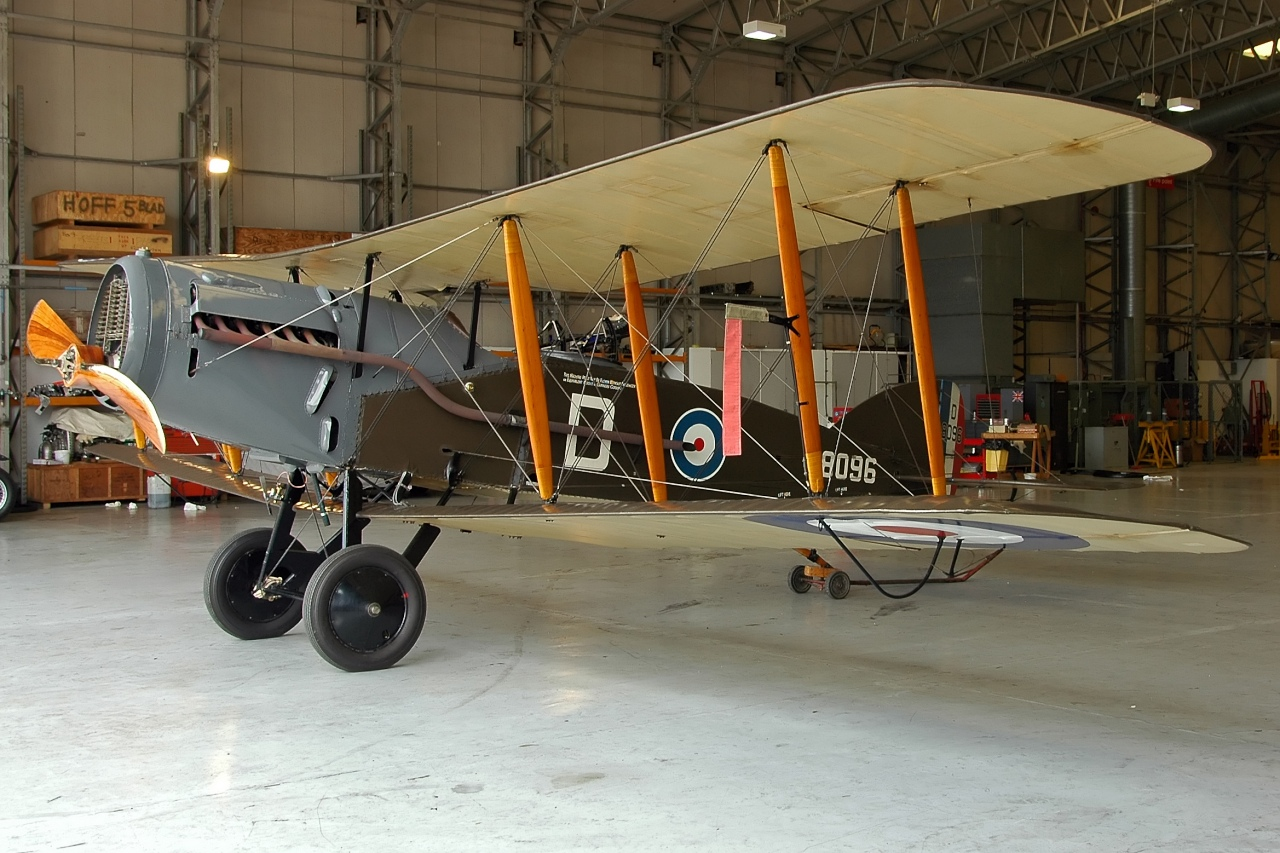
An example of a Bristol Fighter (D8096), the standard RAF army cooperation aircraft in the 1920s

Milne needed to obtain a measure of co-operation from the RAF; Hugh Trenchard, Marshal of the Royal Air Force and professional head of the RAF, agreed that an expeditionary army of four to five divisions would need 25 to 30 RAF squadrons, far more than the eight squadrons promised in Air Staff Memorandum 25, which determined the RAF army-support contribution. (Note: Two long-range bomber–reconnaissance, five army co-operation and one fighter squadron.) Trenchard insisted that it would not be wise to make promises that might not be called upon for twenty years; the Air Ministry did not possess the resources for a fifty-squadron Air Defence of Great Britain (ADGB, created in 1925) and another fifty squadrons each for the army and the Royal Navy. RAF squadrons would have to be multi-purpose to be used as needs dictated.

Milne could not base his plans on assumptions about RAF support that might not be forthcoming but Trenchard told Milne that RAF squadrons were trained for tactical and strategic operations. Trenchard said that ten of the ADGB squadrons were mobile and could move with an expeditionary force at once. It would only take two to three weeks to prepare the others, despite the mobile squadrons not being mobile and would not adequately be equipped for years. In spite of the claims by Trenchard to Milne, only the army co-operation squadrons took much notice of air support for ground forces. At the 1926 Imperial Conference, aircraft dived over moving tanks; the spectacular event was not a realistic exercise but recalled the co-operation during the First World War between the Army, its semi-independent Royal Flying Corps (RFC) and the Royal Naval Air Service (RNAS) which had merged to form the RAF on 1 April 1918.

== Exercises ==
=== Eastland vs. Westland, 1927 ===
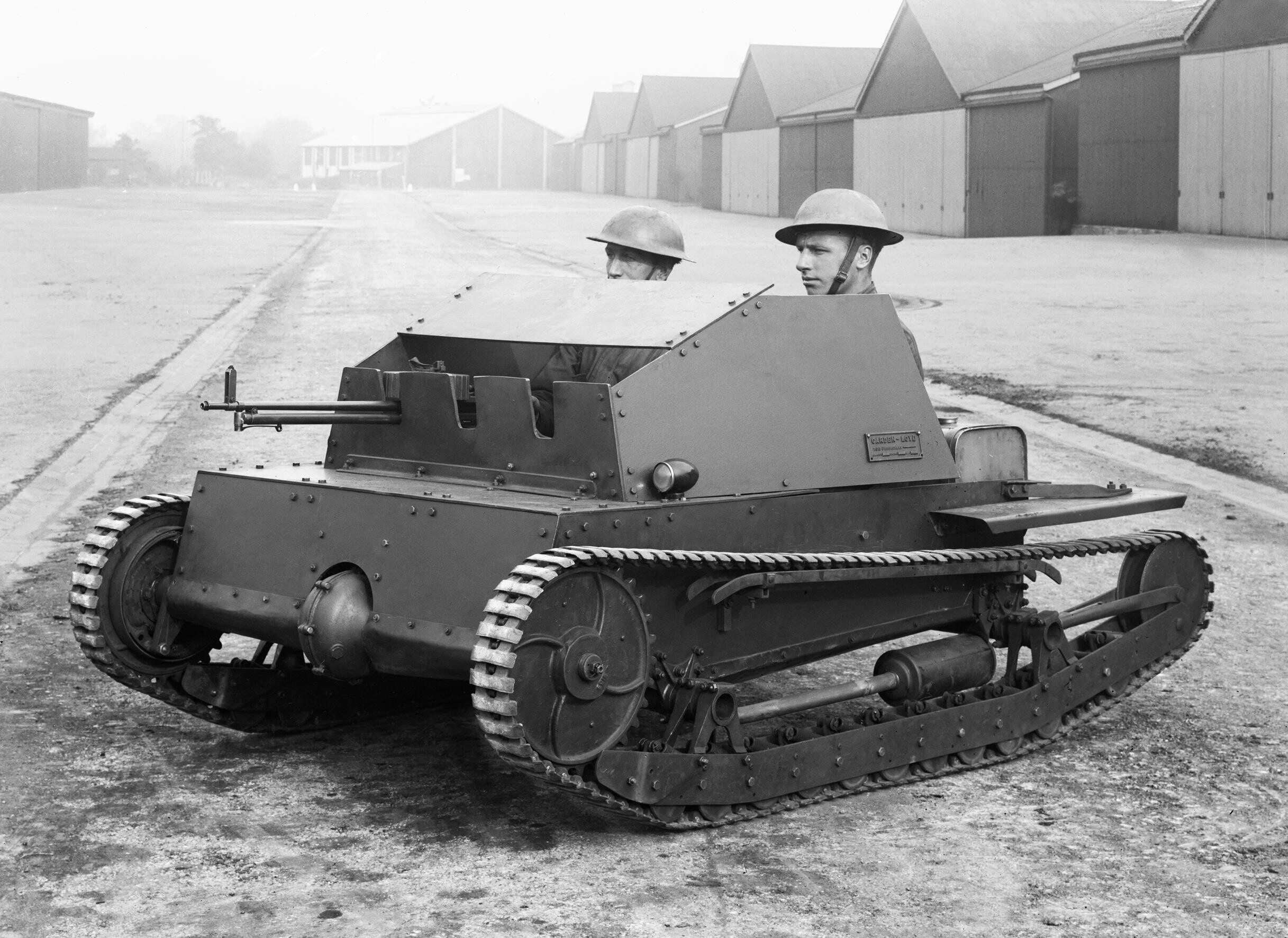
Carden-Loyd Two-Man Tankette, 1926

In 1927, the EMF (Eastland Force) fought the 3rd Infantry Division (Major-General John Burnett-Stuart) and a cavalry brigade (Westland Force), both sides having air support. The opponents began the exercise 35 mi (56 km) apart, Westland Force having an objective to capture high ground near Andover against Eastland Force based at Micheldever. The Fast Group dodged Westland Force cavalry patrols, covered 40 mi (64 km) and captured bridges, which enabled the rest of Eastland Force to advance. Despite a few losses from air attack, the Fast Group armoured cars attacked the vanguard of the Westland Force column and pinned it down for attacks by aircraft at low altitude and a flank attack by the tanks. Eastland Force then camped overnight but Westland Force kept moving.

Eastland Force armoured car and tankette reconnaissance parties spotted the move but lacking wireless communication, sent a despatch rider whose motorcycle broke down. Half of the Westland Force column was over the River Avon before Collins received the information. Part of Westland Force reached the objective on the next day, winning the contest, albeit surrounded and under counter-attack by Eastland Force. After the exercise, Collins discussed the difficulties encountered by the EMF and its vulnerability to anti-tank guns and artillery. Burnett-Stuart said that the tank should no longer be considered an infantry-support weapon but the main arm on the battlefield. The General Staff produced a training memorandum in early 1928 which criticised poor co-ordination in the EMF and its failure to organise sufficient fire support before attacks.

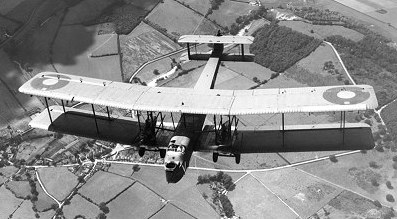
Vickers Virginia bomber

During the exercise, 7 Squadron flying Vickers Virginia and Vimy bombers and 11 Squadron with its single-engined Horsley bombers, participated briefly; the Horsleys were somewhat large aircraft for low-altitude bombing. The Bristol Fighters of 16 Squadron participated throughout the exercise, while the Woodcock fighters of 3 Squadron simulated strafing attacks. The RAF contingent proved to be of great value to motorised units blocked on roads and infantry pinned down by enemy fire; Collins was convinced of the value of low-level ground attack. Sceptics at the War Office doubted the realism of the exercise but other soldiers were enthused by the prospect of a mobile form of military operation superseding trench warfare. At the Air Ministry, Wing Commander Richard Peck, the Deputy Director of the Directorate of Plans (1927 to 1930) pondered the use of aircraft to support mechanised army units in making big outflanking manoeuvres, deep into the rear areas of the enemy army, "We cannot throw away this means to victory....". Bombers, reconnaissance aircraft and troop transports would participate; single-seat fighters would be of great value in pursuing a defeated enemy force. (Note: Peck got in touch with Wing Commander Owen Boyd, commander of the School of Army Co-operation from 1923 to 1926, at the Staff College, Camberley in 1927 and found that Boyd, despite being surprisingly unfamiliar with such ideas, was in favour of rapid ground advances by armoured car units and lorried infantry supported by ground-attack fighters.)

=== Armoured Force, 1928–1933 ===
The EMF was renamed Armoured Force (AF) and in early 1928 its 280 vehicles, of fifteen designs, conducted exercises to test the limits of the force. At the end of the year, the AF was suspended because the army took the view that little more could be learnt from it as presently constituted. It had been too soon to remedy the deficiencies that had emerged and as the exercises became more ambitious, it was found that the tanks were still very vulnerable to bogging down ("sensitive to ground") the force was split up for smaller exercises. Milne wanted a year's interval, due to the lack of light tanks and tankettes, necessary for an experimental brigade comprising a battalion of light tanks and tankettes with three battalions of infantry. In the period 1930 to 1931, Milne intended to establish a permanent Armoured Brigade. An experimental Tank Brigade was established, with three battalions of mixed medium and light tanks and a battalion of Carden-Loyd machine-gun carriers, operating as light tanks for reconnaissance but with no supporting arms. Colonel Charles Broad commanded the brigade and concentrated on improving command by using flag signals and radio sets fitted to company and command vehicles. After two weeks the Army Council witnessed a manoeuvre in formation, that was maintained through a bank of fog, a persuasive example of massed armoured manoeuvre.

==== The Purple Primer, 1929 ====
In March 1929, Broad wrote the first War Office manual about armoured warfare, "Mechanised and Armoured Formations: (Instructions for Guidance when considering their Action), 1929 (provisional)", known as the Purple Primer because of its cover. The manual was intended to provide the framework for staff exercises and was a concise yet wide-ranging document that foreshadowed many of the features of armoured operations in the Second World War. Because equipment and tactics were in flux, officers were told to keep an open mind. The primer contained predictions on the composition, organisation and use of armoured forces. The manual comprised four short chapters on vehicles, organisation, operations and administration. Broad divided vehicles into armoured fighting vehicles (AFVs), armoured troop carriers and soft-skinned carriers, supply vehicles and tractors. AFVs gave an attacker the means to combine fire, manoeuvre and protection, were less vulnerable than conventional units to air attack and gas warfare, AFVs had a great "moral and material effect" on other arms. Broad cautioned that tanks and other armoured vehicles were dependent on supply from a base and limited in cross-country mobility. Static anti-tank guns would always be more powerful than tank-mounted guns and were easier to aim than guns fired on the move. A frontal attack on prepared defences would court severe losses, unless supported by covering fire. Medium tanks were the most powerful and best used to "destroy the enemy by fire or shock action".

The chapter on the organisation of the army of the future described cavalry brigades or divisions, light armoured brigades or divisions, medium armoured brigades and infantry divisions that incorporated armoured units. Medium armoured brigades would be the most powerful units in the army, conducting the most important attacks and providing infantry and cavalry support at times, provided that the commander engaged the armoured brigades under the "most favourable conditions". Five pages of the operations chapter described armoured brigades attacking independently; only half a page was devoted to attacks with the cooperation of infantry and cavalry. For an attack on a defensive position, tanks would be part of the attack, protected by machine-gun fire, smoke screens, air and infantry support. The tanks would exploit success by causing a collapse of the opponent's defences and cut supply lines, creating chaos in which mobile warfare leading to decisive results could occur. The chapter on administration dealt with organisation, supply, recovery and repair of vehicles, traffic control and medical services. Armoured units had considerable support needs which were a severe constraint; gleaning food from the countryside was difficult for such fast-moving formations and their needs for fuel, ammunition and spare parts required a separate supply organisation.

=== Tank Brigade, 1933 ===
The British were the world leaders in tank design and the organisation and use of armoured forces. The Reichswehr in Germany had only a few covert prototype vehicles and had created little in writing about the use of tanks. In the US, tank experiments had only begun and in the USSR, the Red Army had started to develop theories of deep operations but the best Soviet tanks were Vickers derivatives. In late 1933, the new CIGS, Field Marshal Archibald Montgomery-Massingberd, established permanently a Tank Brigade, under the command of Percy Hobart. In February 1934 Massingberd desired to include a tank brigade and a cavalry division, with mechanised transport and light vehicles for reconnaissance, in a Field Force for continental operations. In October Massingberd decided that the cavalry division should be replaced by a mechanised Mobile Division.

In the exercises, bombers and fighters simulated low-altitude ground attacks again and the RAF participation was judged "invaluable". The exercises concentrated on the capacity of an opposing air force to obstruct the advance of British tanks, an important feature of defensive battle. This put the emphasis on finding problems when the exercise could have concentrated on how friendly air support might speed a British advance. The army had control over the air co-operation squadrons and considered them to be a part of the armoured unit, adding to the work of the armoured car reconnaissance vehicles. Collins became apprehensive of the possibility that an opposing air force might prevent RAF air support or that the support would not be forthcoming. Fighters could obtain air superiority to protect the ground force but the RAF could be elsewhere when it was needed, because of the independent status of the RAF. Air support that might or might not materialise could not form the basis of army planning and operations.

=== 1934 ===
On 25 January 1934, Massingberd issued a directive to determine the training of the Tank Brigade which, rather than frontal attacks, emphasised independent operations such as raids and flank attacks. The brigade was to prepare for strategic or quasi-independent attacks on an enemy's organisation behind the front line, by exploiting weakness rather than confronting strengths. The brigade was to examine its ability to manoeuvre en masse, co-operate with the RAF and experiment with the means to supply and maintain the force while moving 70 mi (110 km) a day or 150 mi (240 km) over three days and then conducting an attack. The Tank Brigade was composed of the 2nd, 3rd and 5th battalions of the Royal Tank Corps, each with Vickers medium tanks and tankettes. In May, a staff exercise was conducted to devise methods for deep operations behind an enemy's front line. The opponent had invaded friendly territory and a British counter-offensive was about to begin. The brigade would make a 100 mi (160 km) flank move to attack the enemy's rear organisations 40 mi (64 km) behind the front line. The result was a decision to move dispersed on a wide front, to deceive the enemy as to the objective and to evade air attack. The RAF was to co-operate for reconnaissance, air defence, supply and as a substitute for artillery support, which was thought incapable of keeping up.

When the brigade began to train as a unit, each medium company had an HQ section of four medium tanks and three mixed companies with a command tank, a section of seven tankettes or light tanks, one section of five medium tanks and a section of two tanks for close support, theoretically carrying guns capable of firing high explosive shells; no tanks were armed like this and Vickers medium tanks were substituted instead. Nearly all the force was tracked and there were no infantry or artillery. Hobart manoeuvred the brigade in a 10 by 10 mi (16 by 16 km) box formation which could make 8 mph (13 km/h) covering about 60 mi (97 km) a day and move somewhat more slowly at night. The brigade was so successful that the non-mechanised troops of Aldershot Command complained that they were being set up to fail. In September the Tank Brigade was joined by the 7th Infantry Brigade, a brigade of motorised field artillery and supporting units, to make up the Mobile Force, opposed by a non-mechanised infantry division, a brigade of horsed cavalry and two armoured car units.

==== Battle of Beresford Bridge ====
In the autumn of 1934, Burnett-Stuart, now general officer commanding (GOC) Aldershot Command, judged the Mobile Force to have neglected supply and devised an exercise to challenge the force. Several objectives behind enemy lines near Amesbury were to be raided and the Mobile Force was to be ready to fight a battle after the raids. The exercise required a long approach march from an assembly area and the crossing of a defended obstacle, the Kennet and Avon Canal. The exercise was to begin at 2:00 a.m. on 19 September against the 1st Infantry Division (Major-General John Kennedy), that left only four hours of darkness, insufficient for the move to be completed before daybreak. Lindsay had no command staff and several members of the Tank Brigade and the 7th Infantry Brigade staffs were at odds. (Note: Lindsay was distracted by a family illness and his staff was composed of the two brigade staffs, in which his Brigade major of the infantry brigade, Captain (Brevet-Major) Robert Bridgeman did not get on with Hobart or Hobart's Brigade major, Lieutenant John Crocker.) The first plan was for an advance on a wide front with mixed units of armoured cars, light tanks, motorised infantry and the Vickers Medium Tanks. The faster vehicles would arrive at the canal and seize crossings for the medium tanks to cross as they arrived. The raids would begin at dawn on the next day; Hobart rejected plan because it required the division of the Tank Brigade into mixed columns.

The Mobile Force planned a wide flank move at night, around rather than through the enemy, then a daytime lay-up for maintenance, followed by the raids on day three. Burnett-Stuart had doubts about the plan because of its supply implications and the plan was revised for the 7th Infantry Brigade to capture the canal crossings on day one, the Tank Brigade to cross that night and the plans for the raids to be decided later. The Mobile Force began its advance from Gloucester, west of the River Severn, to break through the defenders' positions at Hungerford. The infantry brigade made a 50 mi (80 km) night move across the front of the defenders and captured easily the crossings. The infantry brigade was bombed while waiting for the Tank Brigade to move during the night. When the tanks arrived, the element of surprise was gone and the Mobile Force faced powerful opposition. During the afternoon of 20 September, umpires judged that the Mobile Force was compelled to retire by air attack; Kennedy sent out armoured cars and his cavalry sortied to the north, planting mines and blocking roads that made the retreat of the Mobile Force most difficult. Despite the partiality of the umpires, the Mobile Force split up and managed to retreat, bypassing many of the obstacles.

== Analysis ==
=== Exercises ===
The Battle of Beresford Bridge was condemned by Liddell Hart in his 1959 publication "The Tanks: The History of the Royal Tank Regiment and its Predecessors Heavy Branch Machine-Gun Corps Tank Corps & Royal Tank Corps 1914–1945". Liddell Hart purported that the rules had been biased against the Mobile Force and claimed that its defeat had an unfortunate effect on the development of armoured forces and on Lindsay's career, who before this exercise had "trapped a larger force...by the boldness and skill by which he had manoeuvred his mobile elements". In 1995, J. P. Harris wrote that the favourable attitude of the General Staff had not been changed by the exercise. Hobart had played down the rigging of the exercise intended to restore the morale of the un-mechanised troops, because it was necessary and supported the umpires because,

...the Powers [sic] were confident that the morale of the Tank Brigade would be unbroken whatever they did. And [sic] I think they were justified in their confidence.

Lindsay lost influence in mechanisation policy after the exercise; he was judged to have failed and was humiliated by Burnett-Stuart at the debriefing after the exercise. Despite retaining the confidence of Montgomery-Massingberd, Lindsay's reputation was irreparably damaged. Lindsay had not been helped by Hobart being awkward at times, at one point almost refusing to continue because the exercise had become so farcical, yet Burnett-Stuart praised him. Harris wrote that by 1933, Lindsay was the most clear-sighted member of the tank lobby, believing that the Tank Brigade should become part of an "all-arms mechanised division" and had devised the best scheme for its organisation. Harris wrote that the views of Lindsay were the reason for Montgomery-Massingberd deciding in October 1934 to form a mobile division. By late 1937 enough equipment had been produced to establish the Mobile Division in Egypt, that evolved into the 7th Armoured Division. Percy Hobart was moved from his position as Director of Military Training to command the force.

In 2014, John Plant wrote that the exercises in England had been unrealistic operations on Salisbury Plain or road-bound, with no obstructions from demolitions or anti-tank obstacles like minefields, broken bridges, rivers, defiles and ridges. With no need for engineers to overcome obstacles, there had been no need to gain control of an area with infantry.

=== The future British Army, 1935 ===
On 9 September 1935, Montgomery-Massingberd promulgated the plan "The Future Reorganisation of the British Army" for the creation of armoured forces. Part I contained an analysis of the First World War, predicted the form of another war with Germany and specified how a Field Force should be organised, equipped and trained for continental warfare. The section drew on the Kirke Report (1932) into the lessons of the Great War, that found that the static warfare of the Western Front had been caused by the firepower of modern weapons and the superiority of defensive methods. At the start of the war, the Army had a machine-gun for every three hundred soldiers and by the end, one for every twenty men. The General Staff described the part played by tanks and aircraft in breaking the stalemate in late 1918 and called them the weapons of the future. Tanks could overcome barbed wire covered by small-arms fire; aircraft enabled an attacker to advance into the hinterland, beyond the zone covered by artillery. In Part II, the peacetime responsibilities of the Army and its extra-continental commitments were laid down, along with the organisation of the Territorial Army. Part III contained general conclusions.

The General Staff had decided by the mid-30s that a horsed cavalry division would be useless in a continental war and that the importance of tank and other armoured formations could not be overestimated. Montgomery-Massingberd wrote that the

introduction of a self-contained armoured formation of our field army...

was one of the most important changes in the Army since 1918. Tanks and armoured vehicles were,

capable of operations widely differing from the close support of infantry for which tanks were originally produced.

The General Staff also wrote a "Forecast of the Opening Stages of a War with Germany" (1935) in which the First World War was considered to have left European states certain that a long war would be calamitous, even for the winning side. Germany was thought to be making "strenuous endeavours" to fight quick wars by mobile operations. The French were thought to have planned a defensive strategy for the beginning of a war and that the Germans could attack with a small, élite mobile force against a small portion of the Maginot Line or bypass it via Switzerland or the Low Countries. The General Staff concluded that the only real prospect for a quick German success was by invading through the Netherlands and Belgium. The General Staff wanted to dispatch a first echelon of the Field Force, comprising four infantry divisions and a mechanised mobile division. (Note: The first part of the Field Force would have a generous allotment of mechanised and armoured troops, two armoured car regiments, preferably two mechanised cavalry brigades, a tank brigade, two mechanised artillery brigades and other supporting troops.) The troops were to arrive swiftly enough to prevent the Germans from occupying all of the Low Countries. Depth would be provided for the air defence of Britain and British bombers would be able to fly from Continental bases. The British Army would "provide sufficient moral and material support to our Allies" to keep the Germans out of the western Netherlands and western Belgium.

== Order of battle ==
- Flank Reconnaissance Group
  - 3rd Battalion Royal Tank Corps (RTC, Lieutenant-Colonel Frederick Pile), HQ, two armoured car companies, one of two sections with four cars each and one of three sections of four cars each
- Main Reconnaissance Group
  - 3rd Battalion RTC, four sections comprising eight Carden Loyd tankettes and eight Morris-Martel tankettes (one-man tankette designed by Martel)
- 5th Battalion RTC (Lieutenant-Colonel C. A. Bolton)
  - 45 Vickers Medium Mark II tanks
  - 1 Radio telephone section with 4 wireless tanks
- 2nd Battalion Somerset Light Infantry (Lieutenant-Colonel H. I. R. Allfrey)
  - Machine gun battalion (Vickers machine guns in Crossley-Kegresse half-tracks and six-wheeler Morrises.
- 9th Field Brigade Royal Artillery (Lieutenant-Colonel C. R. B. Carrington)
  - QF 18 pounder field guns, QF 4.5 inch Howitzers 2 batteries towed by Dragon tractors, 1 battery towed by Crossley-Kégresse half-tracks)
  - 20 Battery (self-propelled Birch Guns)
  - 9th Light Battery, Royal Artillery (3.7-inch mountain howitzers portée on Burford-Kégresse half-tracks)
- 17th Field Company Royal Engineers (Major Giffard Le Quesne Martel)
  - Mounted in 6-wheeler vehicles

Attachments (occasional)

- 2nd Battalion Cheshire Regiment (Lieutenant-Colonel E. G. Hamilton) mechanised infantry battalion, first line transport of half-tracks and six-wheelers, with a bus-column of lorries for exercises with the EMF
- No. 16 (Army co-operation) Squadron
- No. 3 (Fighter) Squadron
- No. 11 (Bombing) Squadron
