= Type 93 light tank =

- Type: Tankette
- Place of origin: Japan

Service history
- Used by: Empire of Japan
- Wars: unknown

Production history
- Designed: 1933
- Produced: unknown
- No. built: unknown

Specifications
- Mass: 7.8 t (7.7 long tons; 8.6 short tons)
- Length: 4.47 m (14 ft 8 in)
- Width: 1.80 m (5 ft 11 in)
- Height: 1.83 m (6 ft 0 in)
- Crew: 3
- Armor: 6–22 mm
- Main armament: 2 x Type 91 6.5 mm machine gun
- Secondary armament: none
- Engine: Mitsubishi diesel 85 hp (64 kW)
- Suspension: Bell crank
- Operational range: 193 kilometers
- Maximum speed: 45 km/h (28 mph) on road

== History ==
Besides the US Army wartime publication, there is no evidence this "light tank" or tankette existed. What has been mistakenly referred to be the Type 93 in the US Army publication was actually a later version of the Type 92 heavy armoured car (tankette).
