= Birch gun =

Birch Gun Mk II
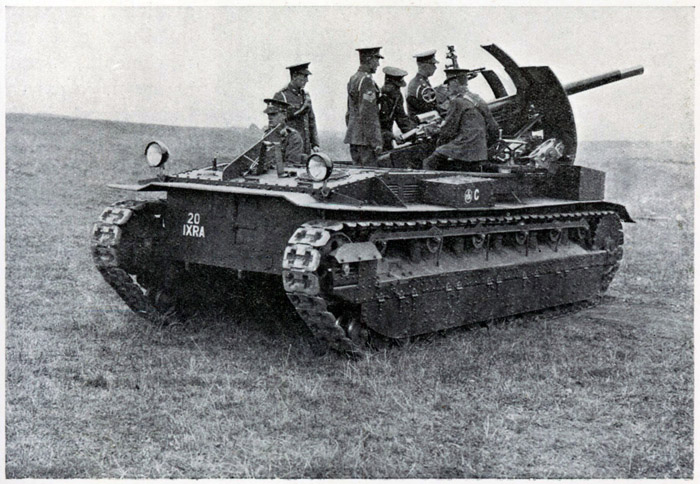
- Mark II Birch Gun in action during British Army manoeuvres
- Type: Self-propelled gun
- Place of origin: United Kingdom

Production history
- Manufacturer: Vickers (chassis), Royal Arsenal (conversion)

Specifications
- Mass: 26,700 lb (12,100 kg)
- Length: 19 ft 3/8 in (5.80 m)
- Width: 7 ft 10 1/2 in (2.40 m)
- Height: 7 ft 6 1/2 in (2.30 m)
- Crew: 6
- Armour: 6 mm (0.24 in) Steel
- Main armament: 1 × QF 18-pounder 3.30 in (83.8 mm) gun
- Engine: 1 × Armstrong Siddeley 8-cylinder petrol engine 90 hp (67 kW)
- Suspension: bogie
- Operational range: 119 mi (192 km)
- Maximum speed: 15 mph (24 km/h)

The Birch Gun was the first practical British self-propelled artillery gun, built at the Royal Arsenal, Woolwich in 1925.

Despite proving itself a practical proposition the Birch Gun was never highly regarded by the British High Command, not for any particular defect or capability issue, but due to the belief that such an innovation was unrequired, expensive and unnecessary. Named after General Sir Noel Birch, who was Master General of Ordnance at the time, the Birch gun comprised a Vickers Medium Mark II tank chassis originally fitted with a QF 18-pounder (83.8 mm) gun. This remained the armament in all the models, although the latest version, generally called the Mk III, had limited elevation. Birch Guns were used in the Experimental Mechanized Force manoeuvres of 1928, but by 1931 they had been removed from service and political pressure was applied to prevent any plans to complete the third revision of the weapon.

== Armament ==
The armament for the original Birch Gun consisted of an Ordnance QF 18 pounder field gun (3.3 inch, 84 mm). The mounting and sighting arrangements varied in the various versions but the gun remained the same.

== Powerplant ==
The Armstrong Siddeley engine was only moderately powerful by later standards, an 8-cylinder 90 horse power unit which gave a maximum speed of 13 mph/24 km/h. it was considered more than adequate and had twice the Whippet's range.

== Use ==
The Birch gun was tested as part of the Experimental Mechanized Force (EMF) in the 1920s. The Force undertook various experiments in mechanized warfare combining tanks and infantry with their own motorised transport.

The components of the EMF were:

- reconnaissance group with tankettes and armoured cars
- battalion of 48 Vickers medium tanks
- motorised machine gun battalion
- mechanised artillery regiment
  - including one battery of Birch guns
- motorised field engineer company

== Bibliography ==
- Fletcher, David (1990). Moving the Guns: the Mechanisation of the Royal Artillery, 1854–1939. HMSO. ISBN 0-11-290477-7.
- Livesey, Jack (2007). Armoured Fighting Vehicles of World War I and II. London: Southwater. ISBN 978-1-84476-370-2.
