= Morris-Martel =

British tankette

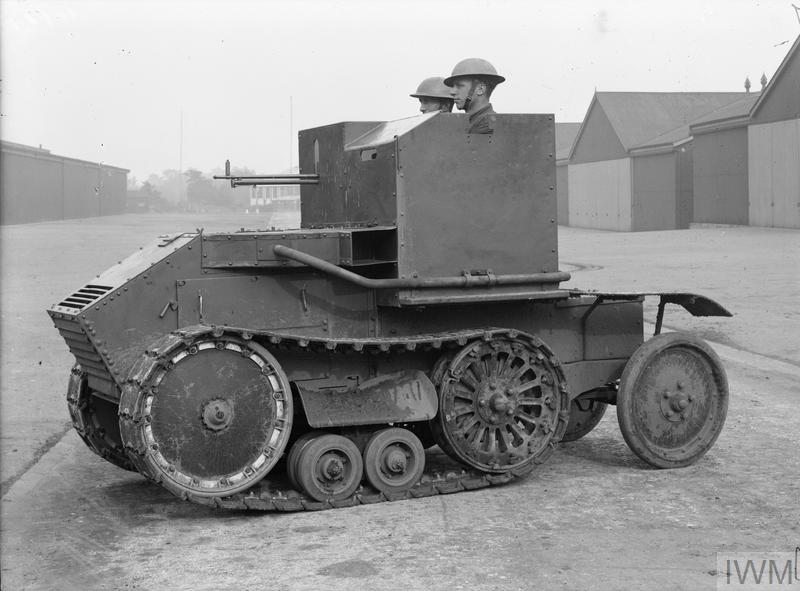
- Morris-Martel Tankette 2-man variant
- Type: Tankette
- Place of origin: United Kingdom

Service history
- In service: 1927-1928
- Used by: United Kingdom (prototypes only)
- Wars: None

Production history
- Designer: Sir Giffard Le Quesne Martel
- Designed: 1925
- Manufacturer: Morris Commercial Cars
- Produced: 1927
- No. built: 8
- Variants: 1-man and 2-man variants

Specifications
- Mass: 2.25 long tons (2.29 t)
- Crew: 1-2 depending on model
- Armour: 0.3 in (7.6 mm)
- Main armament: Lewis Gun
- Engine: Morris "16hp"
- Suspension: Leaf spring
- Ground clearance: 18 in (460 mm)
- Maximum speed: 30 mph (48 km/h) on road

The Morris-Martel was a British inter-war tankette developed from prototypes designed by Lieutenant-General Sir Giffard Le Quesne Martel. Intended for reconnaissance, eight were constructed for the Experimental Mechanized Force and were tested on Salisbury plain in 1927, against experimental models of the Carden Loyd tankette built by John Carden and Vivian Loyd as a response to Martel's work. The project was abandoned after testing with the Carden Loyd design chosen instead; during its short existence the tankette attracted "quite a lot of publicity" and was a pioneer of the tankette concept.
