= T23 =

T23 may refer to:

== Aviation ==
- Aerotec T-23, a Brazilian military trainer
- Albany Municipal Airport (Texas), in Shackelford County, Texas, United States
- Junkers T 23, a German experimental trainer
- Slingsby T.23 Kite 1A, a British glider

== Rail and transit ==
=== Rolling stock ===
- SJ T23, a Swedish locomotive
- WEG T 23, a German railbus

=== Stations ===
- Nishi-Funabashi Station, in Funabashi, Chiba, Japan
- Tanimachi Yonchōme Station, in Chūō-ku, Osaka, Japan
- Yashima Station (Kagawa), in Takamatsu, Kagawa, Japan

== Ships and boats ==
- Columbia T-23, an American sailboat
- French frigate Tunisien
- German torpedo boat T23

== Other uses ==
- Cooper T23, a British racing car
- T23 Medium Tank, an American prototype tank
- T-23 Tankette, a Soviet tank
- T23 road (Tanzania), a road in Tanzania
- ThinkPad T23, a notebook computer
