= Vivian Loyd =

English military engineer

Captain Vivian Graham Loyd MC
- Born: 13 May 1894; Windsor, Berkshire, England
- Died: 1972 (aged 77–78); Windsor, Berkshire, England
- Education: Wellington College, Berkshire
- Spouse(s): Enid Beatrice Loyd, Phyllis M. Loyd
- Parent(s): Captain William Graham Loyd, Emily Diana Mary Loyd
- Engineering career
- Discipline: Vehicle design
- Employers: Loyd-Lord, Carden-Loyd Tractors Ltd, Vickers-Armstrong
- Significant design: Carden Loyd tankette, Loyd Carrier
- Awards: Military Cross

Captain Vivian Graham Loyd MC (13 May 1894 – 1972) was an English soldier and engineer who designed armoured vehicles including the Carden Loyd tankette and Loyd Carrier.

== Early years ==
Vivian Graham Loyd was born in Windsor, Berkshire, to a family of Welsh origin. His parents were Captain William Graham Loyd and Emily Diana Mary Loyd. He was educated at Wellington College, Berkshire, after which he worked in a bank in Canada.

== Military career ==
Loyd was commissioned as a second lieutenant in the 4th Home Counties (Cinque Ports) Brigade, Royal Field Artillery (RFA) on 1 May 1913.

During the First World War he served in India from 1914–1916 and Mesopotamia from 1916, where he contracted tuberculosis, which was the reason for his subsequent health problems. He ended the war as a captain, having been promoted to lieutenant in August 1914, after the war began.

== Engineering career ==
After the First World War, Loyd became an engineer, initially making cars then moving on to light armoured vehicles.

=== Loyd-Lord ===
Loyd founded a small car manufacturing company with A. O. Lord in December 1922, where they built passenger cars of Loyd’s design, under the brand name Loyd-Lord (possibly a tongue in cheek reference to the Rolls-Royce marque). Falling into debt, the company was liquidated in 1924.

=== Carden-Loyd Tractor Ltd ===
In 1922 or 1923 Loyd met self-taught engineer Sir John Carden, with whom he founded the small Carden-Loyd Tractor Company in Chertsey near London. Together they started working on the design of tracked vehicles, primarily with military applications. Carden was chief engineer on the team while Loyd was mainly responsible for organizational issues and marketing.

Carden and Loyd rapidly took the lead in development and managed to get the British Army interested in their vehicle for reconnaissance purposes as well as for a weapons carrier. By doing so they blurred the original concept, for the Army called Carden-Loyd’s carriers “Tankettes” and thus gave the impression that the Tank Corps and not the Infantry had a vested interest in them.

In practice, carriers extended the range and safety of infantrymen and gave them the opportunity to raise their speed to that of the tank arm by acting as a team which could be formed around the principal armoured fighting vehicle – the tank. This was the essence of the “All Armoured Idea”, which few at the time really understood, and which many more traditionally minded soldiers reviled as the “All Tank Idea.”

Steadily, these versatile little Carriers were improved and for lack of anything better, played an important part in reconnaissance and protection duties for the main force of medium tanks during the first British Armoured Force experiments of 1927 and 1928. Carden-Loyd would be bought out by Vickers-Armstrong in 1928. The Carden-Loyd carriers grew into Light Tanks, while foreign purchasers came forward to buy the basic vehicle and adapt it in their own factories to suit their own requirements. France’s Renault UE Chenillette, Russia’s T-27 and the Italian CV-33 and CV-35 came closer to the weapons carrier concept, although they are often referred to as tanks. In Britain, the weapon carrier would return to the Infantry in 1935 with the introduction of the Universal Carrier, a tracked and lightly armoured carrier which would become ubiquitous within the British Army through World War II.

=== Vivian Loyd & Co ===
Loyd remained in the shadow of John Carden, and after Carden’s death in a plane crash in 1935, relations between Vickers management and Loyd deteriorated. In September 1938 Loyd finally left Vickers and founded his own company, Vivian Loyd & Co. In August 1938 he presented a prototype of a low-cost light tracked artillery tractor, the Loyd Carrier. It was ordered by the British army during the war and more than 26,000 units were built, 2,790 from Loyd’s factory. After the war, Loyd built crawler tractors and agricultural machinery.

== Personal life ==
Loyd died in 1972 at his farm in Berkshire. He was married three times and had two sons and two daughters. His grandson by his son is Anthony Loyd, a noted journalist and war correspondent.

== Bibliography ==
- Christopher F. Foss, Peter McKenzie: The Vickers Tanks, 1995, ISBN 1-899506-10-1.
