= Giffard Martel =

British Army officer (1889–1958)

Lieutenant-General Sir Giffard Martel KCB KBE DSO MC
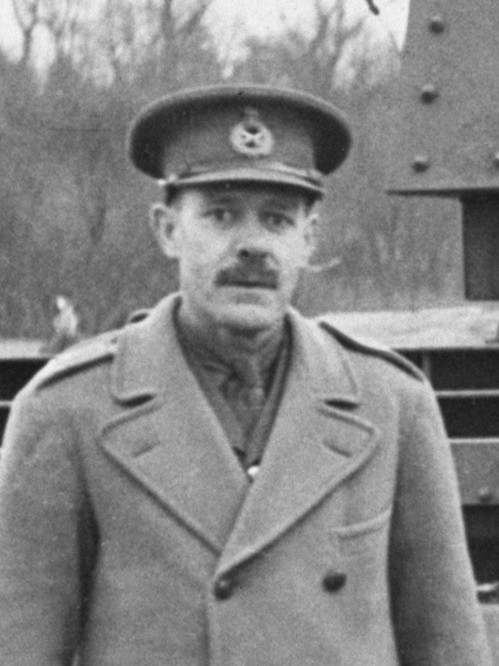
- Martel in 1941
- Born: 10 October 1889; Millbrook, Southampton, Hampshire, England
- Died: 3 September 1958 (aged 68); Camberley, Surrey, England
- Military career
- Allegiance: United Kingdom
- Branch: British Army
- Service years: 1908–1945
- Rank: Lieutenant-General
- Nicknames: "Q Martel" "Q"
- Service number: 6628
- Units: Royal Engineers; Royal Tank Regiment
- Commands: 9th Field Company RE; 50th (Northumbrian) Infantry Division; Royal Armoured Corps
- Conflicts: First World War; Great Retreat; First Battle of the Marne; First Battle of the Aisne; Battle of Armentières; Second Battle of Ypres; Battle of the Somme; Second World War
- Awards: Knight Commander of the Order of the Bath; Knight Commander of the Order of the British Empire; Distinguished Service Order; Military Cross; Mentioned in Despatches (5)

Lieutenant-General Sir Giffard Le Quesne Martel, KCB, KBE, DSO, MC (10 October 1889 – 3 September 1958) was a British Army officer who served in both the First and Second World Wars. Familiarly known as "Q Martel" or just "Q", he was a pioneering British military engineer and tank strategist.

== Early life and military career ==
Born into a traditional military family he was the son of Brigadier-General Sir Charles Philip Martel who was Chief Superintendent of Ordnance Factories. He married Maud Mackenzie on 29 July 1922 and they had one son.

Martel entered the Royal Military Academy, Woolwich, in 1908 and was commissioned as a second lieutenant into the British Army's Royal Engineers on 23 July 1909. Martel was instrumental in the establishment of The Royal Navy and Army Boxing Association in 1911 and was Army and Inter Services boxing champion both before and after World War I.

== First World War ==
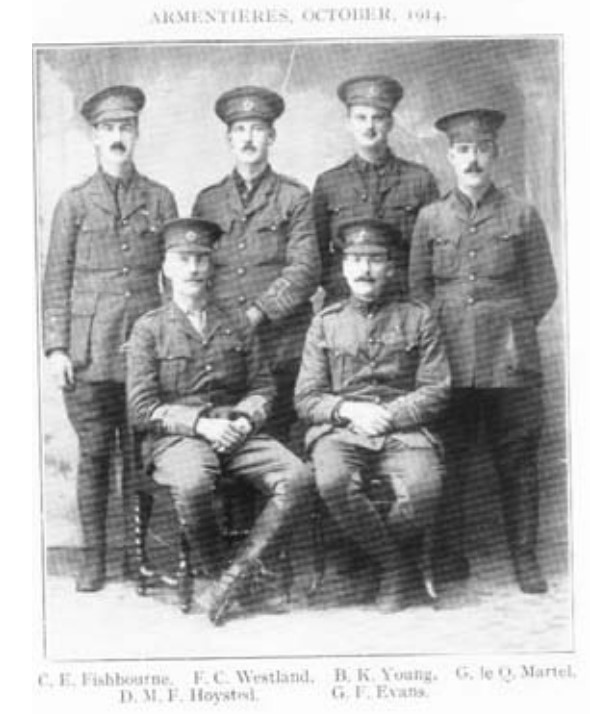
A young Lt Martel (furthest right), October 1914.

Martel deployed for the First World War with 9th Field Company RE, serving in the Great Retreat, First Battle of the Marne, First Battle of the Aisne, the Battle of Armentières and the Second Battle of Ypres. He commanded the 9th Field Company from October 1915 to July 1916.

In 1916, as a sapper officer with direct experience of the first British use of tanks on the Somme, Martel was put in charge of recreating a 1.5-mile (2.4 km) wide replica of the British and German trench systems, complete with no man's land, at Elveden, Norfolk, as part of a tank training ground.

There he developed a keen interest in tank theory believing them to be the future of warfare and in November 1916 he wrote a paper, A Tank Army, suggesting an army composed entirely of armoured vehicles. As J. F. C. Fuller's GSO3 the wide-ranging ideas set out in this paper profoundly influenced Fuller's thinking which at the time simply regarded the tank as no more than a useful adjunct to infantry on the battlefield. Martel was also interested in the construction of wire net roads as deployed in the British Army's 1917–1918 campaign in the Sinai and Palestine and their use in supporting tracked vehicles.

In late 1916, Martel was on Hugh Elles' staff at Bermicourt in France assisting Fuller on the operational planning.

In addition to his Military Cross (1915) and Distinguished Service Order (1916), in the course of the war Martel was mentioned in despatches five times.

== Between the wars ==
After the Armistice with Germany, now a major, Martel was able to combine his two interests of tanks and military bridging when he became head of the Experimental Bridging Establishment at Christchurch, Hampshire, which researched the possibilities of using tanks for battlefield engineering purposes such as bridge-laying and mine-clearing. Here he continued trials on modified Mark V tanks. The bridging component involved an assault bridge, designed by Major Charles Inglis RE, the Canal Lock Bridge, which had sufficient length to span a canal lock.

Martel, who attended the Staff College, Camberley, from 1921 to 1922, also developed his new bridging concept at the EBE, the Martel bridge, a modular box girder bridge suitable for military use. The Martel bridge was adopted by the British Army in 1925 as the "Large Box Girder Bridge". A smaller version, the Small Box Girder Bridge, was also formally adopted by the Army in 1932 and copied by many countries, including Germany, who called their version the Kastenrager-Gerät (K-Gerät for short). The United States created a copy, the H-20. The modular construction of the basic Martel bridge was also used for the Bailey bridge. In 1954, the Royal Commission on Awards to Inventors awarded Martel £500 for infringement on the design of his bridge by the designer of the Bailey bridge, Donald Bailey.

Martel also continued to pursue his interest in tanks independently. In 1925 he built, in his own garage, a one-man tankette powered by a car engine and capable of a speed of 15 mph (24 km/h). After a demonstration to the War Office, Morris Commercial Cars was contracted to build four test models, the first of which was delivered in 1926. Carden Loyd Tractors built a similar one-man machine, the Carden Loyd One Man Tankette.

In 1927, eight more Martel tankettes were ordered to assess their potential role in forward reconnaissance. They were tested along with two-man Carden Loyd tankettes in manoeuvres with the Experimental Mechanized Force on Salisbury Plain in 1927 and 1928.

The idea for a single-man fighting vehicle was soon dropped as it became apparent that one operator could not control the vehicle at the same time as firing a weapon and the British Army requirement for a light tank, the Light Tank Mark I, was a development of the Carden Loyd tankette. Morris Motors tried developing a two-man version of the Martel design and Crossley Motors a further version – the Morris-Martel – in 1927 with Kégresse rubber tracks but after two prototypes were tested the project was abandoned.

In 1928, the Tank and Tracked Transport Advisory Committee that Martel was a member of became the Mechanical Warfare Board which was to liaise with industry and to advise on technical matters relating to "mechanised transport". In 1929, Martel was seconded to the King George V's Own Bengal Sappers and Miners and then served as an instructor at the British Indian Army's Staff College in Quetta from 1930 until 1934, after which he attended the Imperial Defence College. 1931 a invention by Martel concerned a vehicle drive system, and in particular the patent GB386987, which described an invention for a combined wheel-cum-track-drive system.

From 1936 until 1939, Martel served at the War Office, first as Assistant Director of Mechanisation, then from 1938 as the Deputy Director with the temporary rank of Brigadier. He was promoted to colonel on 21 October 1936, with seniority backdated to 1 January 1932, and appointed assistant director of mechanisation at the War Office.

In 1936, he attended along with Wavell a large-scale tank exercise in the Belorussian Military District of the Soviet Union in which large numbers of the Soviet BT tanks took part. Martel pressured for a similar fast tank design to be investigated for addition to British tank brigades and convinced the General Staff to issue a specification for a cruiser tank.

Martel was appointed General Officer Commanding the 50th Northumbrian Division, Territorial Army in February 1939 with the rank of major-general. The division had been converted from October 1938 to "motorised" with the whole of the infantry being carried by large lorries.

== Second World War ==
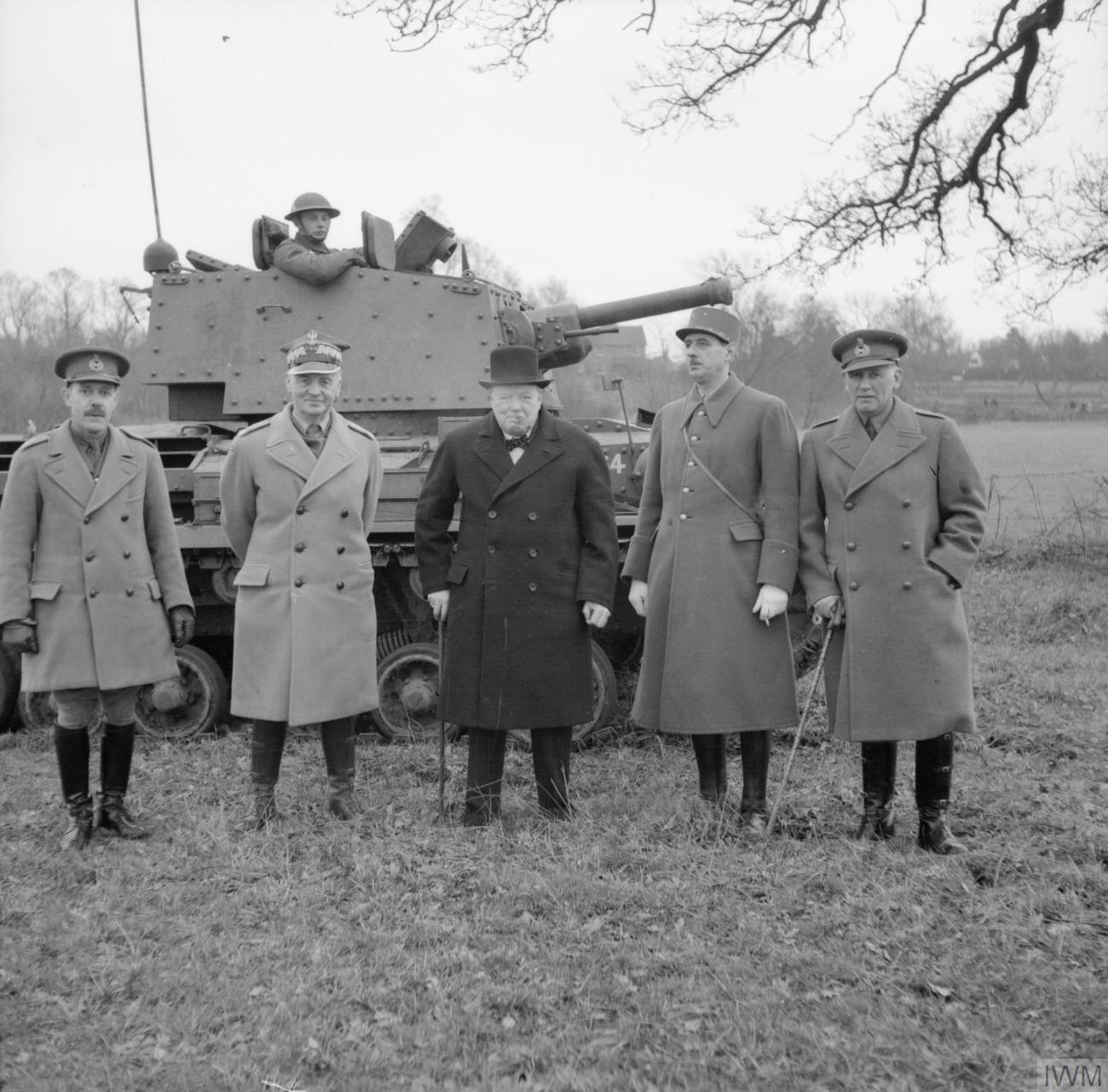
After a tank demonstration near Frensham, Surrey; Martel, Władysław Sikorski (Prime Minister of the Polish Government-in-Exile and C-in-C of the Polish Armed Forces), Winston Churchill, General Charles de Gaulle (C-in-C of the Free French Forces) and Willoughby Norrie (GOC 1st Armoured Division), February 1941.

The 50th Division embarked for France on 14 September 1939 as part of the British Expeditionary Force (BEF). There, on 21 May 1940 during the Battle of France, Martel directed the tank attack on the 7th Panzer Division in the Battle of Arras in which the German frontline was driven back eight miles.

Following the BEF's evacuation, Martel became the Commander of the Royal Armoured Corps in 1940 where he put his theories of armoured warfare to good use. In March 1941, he gave the military attaché of the neutral United States in London, Brigadier General Raymond E. Lee, a report outlining his experiences and assessment of the German armoured tactics in France.

In March 1943, Martel became the Head of the Military Mission to the Soviet Union. He assessed the effectiveness of the Soviet order of battle and tactics during a visit to the front line in the Kursk-Oryol region between 11 and 19 May 1943.

His reports based on his visit to the Soviet front line and his discussions with the Red Army Tank Directorate concluded that the Soviet battlefield experience would be far more relevant to armoured tactics in the forthcoming Operation Overlord than that of the experience of the British Army in the North African campaign. Martel's intelligence-gathering and his clear and perceptive analyses of the Soviet military position were commended by his superiors at the War Office but with the arrival of the new and overtly anti-communist Head of RAF Mission, Air Marshal Sir John Babington in September 1943 his working relationship with the Soviets deteriorated with a marked decline in co-operation. He was recalled, being replaced by Lieutenant-General Montagu Burrows and left Moscow on 7 February 1944. Later that month, he lost his right eye as a result of a German bombing raid on London.

== Subsequent life ==
Martel was knighted in 1943, with the Knight Commander of the Order of the Bath following in 1944. He retired from the army in 1945 with the rank of lieutenant-general. He stood unsuccessfully as the Conservative Party candidate for the Barnard Castle constituency in the 1945 UK General Election.

On his retirement, Martel wrote on military matters. He died at his home in Camberley, Surrey, on 3 September 1958.

== Publications ==
- Bridging in the Field. London: The Institution. 1922. OCLC 43902675.
- In the Wake of the Tank: The First Eighteen Years of Mechanization in the British Army. London: Sifton, Praed & Co. 1935. OCLC 8572309.
- Our Armoured Forces. An account of their operations during the war of 1939–45. London: Faber & Faber. 1945. OCLC 562608463.
- The Problem of Security. London: Michael Joseph. 1945. OCLC 2342477.
- The Russian Outlook. London: Michael Joseph. 1947. OCLC 2386676.
- An Outspoken Soldier, His Views and Memoirs. London: Sifton Praed & Co. 1949. OCLC 2187093.
- East Versus West. London: Museum Press. 1952. OCLC 2107160.

== Bibliography ==
- Mead, Richard (2007). Churchill's Lions: A Biographical Guide to the key British generals of World War II. Stroud: Spellmount. ISBN 978-1-86227-431-0.
- Smart, Nick (2005). Biographical Dictionary of British Generals of the Second World War. Barnsley: Pen and Sword Books. ISBN 978-1-84-415049-6.

Military offices
Preceded by William Herbert	GOC 50th (Northumbrian) Infantry Division; 1939–1940	Succeeded by William Ramsden
