= Type 94 tankette =

Japanese tankette

Type 94
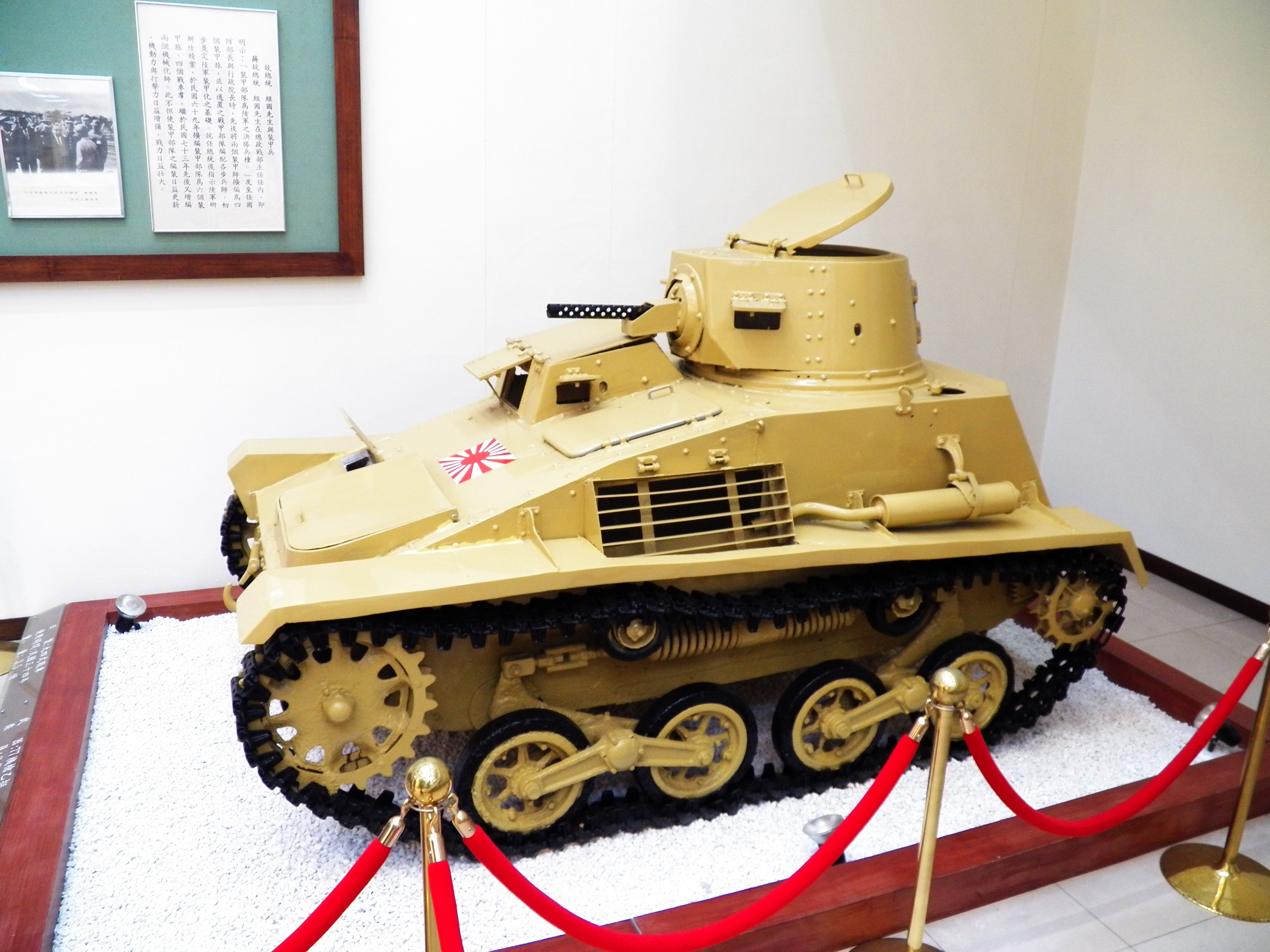
- Type 94 tankette at the Armor School History Museum
- Type: Tankette
- Place of origin: Empire of Japan

Service history
- Used by: Imperial Japanese Army; National Revolutionary Army (captured); Chinese Red Army (captured); Manchukuo Imperial Army

Production history
- Designed: 1932
- Unit cost: 25,300 yen ($6,798 USD) in August 1939, excluding armament
- Produced: 1935–1940
- No. built: 823

Specifications
- Mass: 3.4 tonnes (3.35 long tons; 3.75 short tons)
- Length: 3.08 m (10 ft 1 in)
- Width: 1.62 m (5 ft 4 in)
- Height: 1.62 m (5 ft 4 in)
- Crew: 2 (commander, driver)
- Armor: 8–12 mm (0.31–0.47 in)
- Main armament: 6.5mm Type 91 machine gun
- Engine: Mitsubishi Franklin air-cooled inline 4-cylinder gasoline 32 hp (24 kW)
- Power/weight: 9 hp/tonne (6.7 kW/tonne)
- Suspension: 2-wheel bogie
- Operational range: 200 km (120 mi)
- Maximum speed: 40 km/h (25 mph)

The Type 94 tankette (Japanese: 九四式軽装甲車, romanized: Kyūyon-shiki keisōkōsha, literally "94 type light armored car"; also known as TK, an abbreviation of Tokushu Keninsha, literally "special tractor") was a tankette used by the Imperial Japanese Army in the Second Sino-Japanese War, at Nomonhan against the Soviet Union, and in World War II. Although tankettes were often used as ammunition tractors, and general infantry support, they were designed for reconnaissance, and not for direct combat. The lightweight Type 94 proved effective in China as the Chinese National Revolutionary Army had only three tank battalions to oppose them, and those tank battalions were equipped only with some British export models and Italian CV-33 tankettes. As with nearly all tankettes built in the 1920s and 1930s, they had thin armor that could be penetrated by .50 caliber (12.7 mm) machine gun fire at 600 yards (550 m) range.

== History and development ==
From the 1920s, the Imperial Japanese Army tested a variety of European light tanks, including several Renault FTs, and a decision was reached in 1929 to proceed with the domestic development of a new vehicle based largely on the Carden-Loyd Mk VI tankette design to address the deficiencies of wheeled armored cars.

The initial attempt resulted in the Type 92 Jyu-Sokosha for use by the cavalry. However, Japanese infantry commanders felt that a similar vehicle would be useful as the support vehicle for transport, scout and communications within the infantry divisions.

A tankette fad occurred in Europe in the early 1930s, which was led by United Kingdom's Carden-Loyd Mk VI tankette. The IJA ordered six samples from the UK, along with some French Renault UE Chenillette vehicles and field tested them. The IJA determined that the British and French machines were too small to be practical, and started planning for a larger version, the Tokushu Keninsha (TK, meaning "Special Tractor"). The Imperial Japanese Army also experimented with a variety of armored cars with limited success. The wheeled armored cars were not suitable for most operations in the puppet state of Manchukuo, due to the poor road conditions and severe winter climate.

The design of the Type 94 began in 1932. Development was given to Tokyo Gas and Electric Industry (later known as Hino Motors) in 1933, and an experimental model was completed. It was a small light tracked vehicle with a turret armed with one machine gun. For cargo transportation it pulled an ammunition trailer. After trials in both Manchukuo and Japan, the design was standardized. It was reclassified as the Type 94 (Type 2594; tankette) and was designed for reconnaissance, but could also be used for supporting infantry attacks and transporting supplies. It entered service in 1935.) The Type 94 was later superseded by the Type 97 Te-Ke tankette, which was designed as a fast reconnaissance vehicle.

Many British and American sources have confused the Type 92 cavalry tank, of which only 167 were built with the Type 94, although the Type 94 was the model almost always encountered in the various fronts of the Pacific War.

== Design ==
The design of the Type 94 was inspired by the British Carden-Loyd Mark VIb tankettes. The IJA received delivery of six of these in 1930. Although the Japanese determined that both the Mark VIb and the French Renault UE were too small, they liked certain features of each of them. The design of the Type 94 had more similarities with the Vickers light tanks of the time. The hull of the Type 94 was of riveted and welded construction, with a front-mounted engine with the driver to the right. The engine was an air-cooled petrol motor that developed 35 hp (26 kW) at 2,500 rpm. Like many Japanese armored vehicles intended to operate in hot conditions, the engine was given asbestos insulation to protect the occupants from its heat. The commander stood in a small (unpowered) turret at the rear of the hull. A large door in the rear of the hull accessed the storage compartment.

Initially, the armament was a Type 91 6.5×50mm machine gun, although later models carried a Type 92 7.7 mm machine gun. The suspension consisted of four bogies - two on each side. These were suspended by bell-cranks resisted by externally placed armored compression springs placed horizontally, one each side of the hull. Each bogie had two small rubber road wheels with the drive sprocket at the front and the idler at the rear. There were two track-return rollers. In combat service the Type 94 was found to be prone to throwing its tracks in high speed turns. Further redesign work was carried out in 1937 on the suspension and the small idler was replaced by a larger diameter idler wheel suspended from a rocker arm that was now in ground contact; it did not completely solve the problem. Later models of the Type 94 had a revised suspension with the larger diameter idler wheel on a longer chassis. This increased the length of the tankette to 3.35 m (11 ft 0 in).

=== Variants ===
Several variants of the Type 94 were produced. These included the Type 94 "disinfecting vehicle" and Type 94 "gas-scattering vehicle", which were adapted for chemical warfare. Others produced were the "Type 97 pole planter" and "Type 97 cable layer", which acted in unison. These used the Type 94 chassis, with the former vehicle first planting a telegraph pole and then the latter vehicle laying the telegraph cable.

== Operational service ==
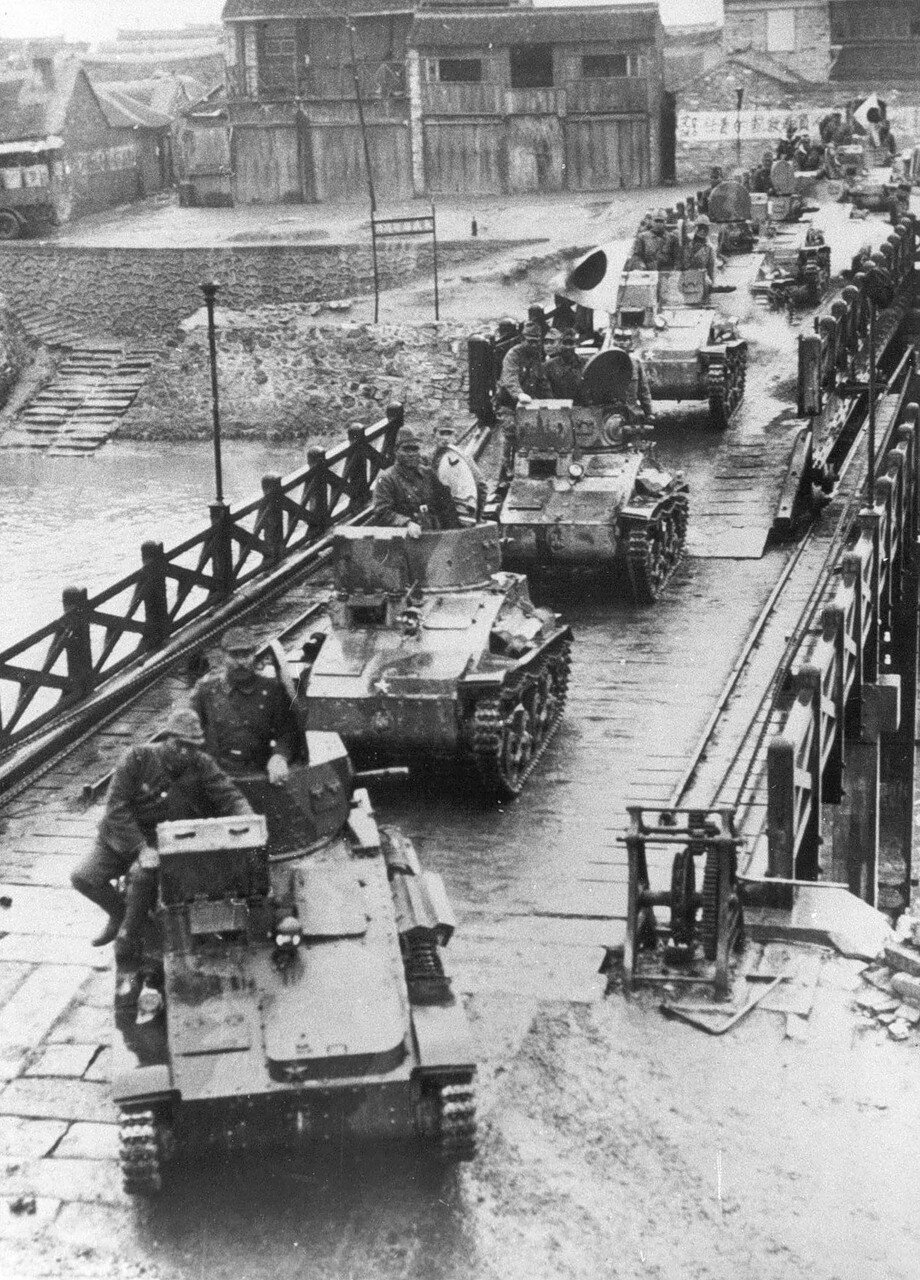
Type 94 tankette column, circa 1935

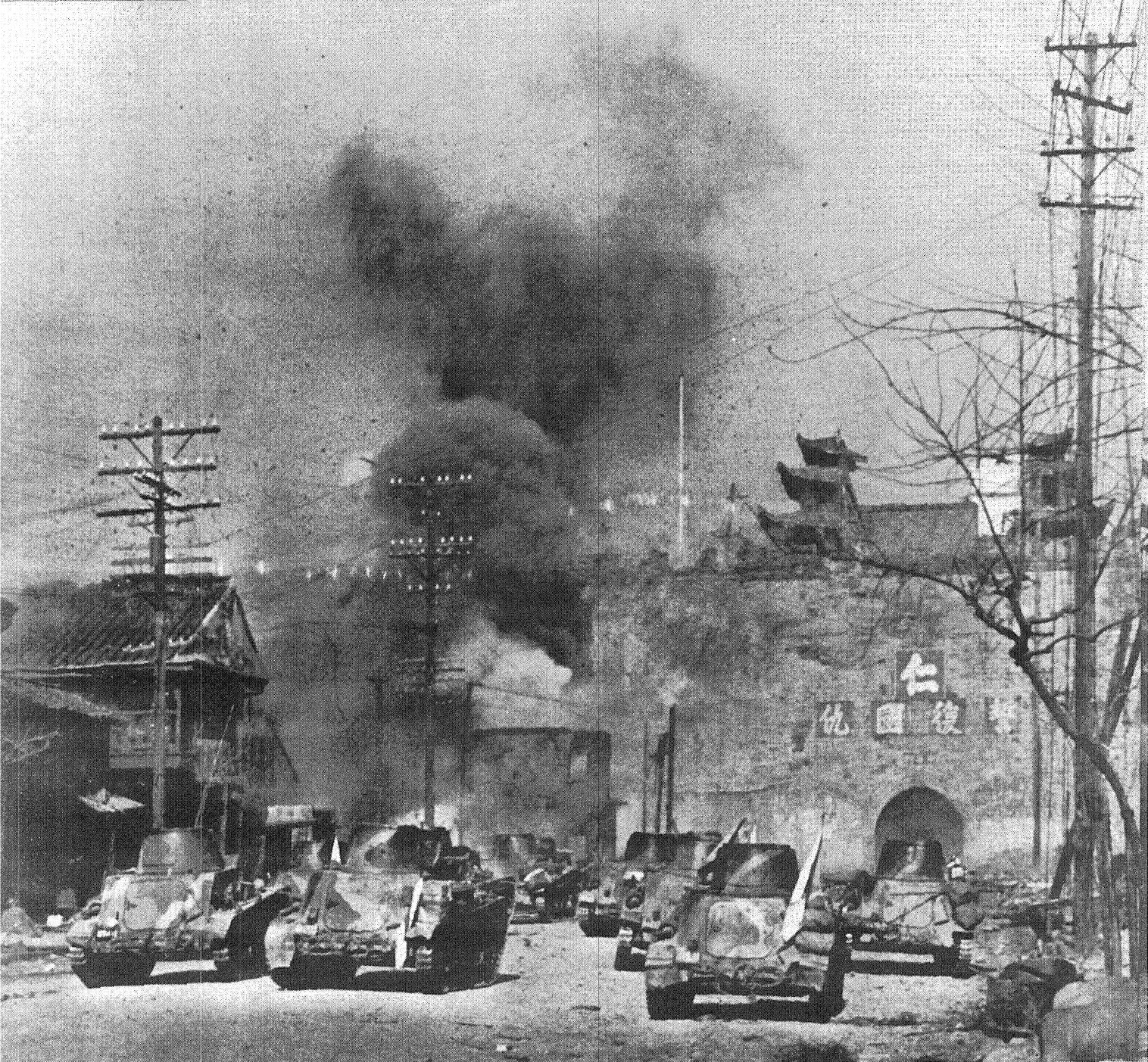
The moment of the blast, at the Gate of China (December 12, 1937).

The Type 94 was mainly deployed in "Tankette Companies". They were attached to infantry divisions for use in the reconnaissance role. Each Japanese division had four tankette platoons, with four tankettes in each platoon. The Type 94 tankette was an inexpensive vehicle to build, at approximately half the price of the Type 95 Ha-Go light tank, resulting in more Type 94's entering service than any other Japanese tankette (823 units). Production included 300 units in 1935, 246 units in 1936, 200 units in 1937, 70 units in 1938, 5 units in 1939 and 2 units in 1940. The lightweight Type 94 was "tailored" for operating in China and proved to be effective for infantry support and reconnaissance by infantry divisions. Given the utility of the design in combat in China, the Imperial Japanese Army was content to retain the Type 94, although the design, and indeed the concept of the tankette, came to be regarded as obsolescent in Western armies.

With the start of World War II, a number of Type 94s were issued to each Japanese infantry division in the Pacific theatre, with a tracked trailer. They saw action in Burma, the Netherlands East Indies, the Philippines and on a number of islands in the South Seas Mandate. Some were also assigned to Imperial Japanese Navy Land Forces. A detachment of eight Type 94 tankettes forming the 56th Infantry Group Tankette Unit (Also named the Anai tankette unit, after the name of their captain), part of the "Sakaguchi Detachment", had a notable role in the Japanese conquest of Java, engaging a large enemy element on 2 March and routing them, capturing a bridge on the same night, and at dawn overrunning a position of 600 enemy soldiers on the opposite bank, and participating in offensive operations that led to the surrender of Dutch forces over the next few days near Surakarta. The Sakaguchi detachment, along with the Shoji detachment, would receive a thank you letter from their parent unit (the 16th Army) for their actions in the campaign, the only units to receive them.

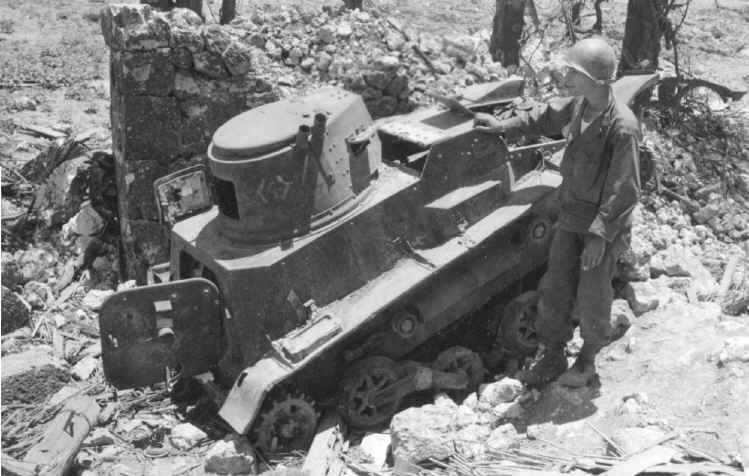
Type 94 tankette captured at the Battle of Okinawa

In 1941, the Wang Jingwei regime's army was given eighteen Type 94 tankettes. In 1943 ten Type 94 tankettes were given to the Manchukuo Imperial Army to form an armored company. They were still in use as late as 1945.

Major deployments included:

- Hebei, China: 1st Tank Battalion and 2nd Tank Battalion
- Chahar Province, China: 1st Independent Mixed Brigade
- Shanghai, China: 5th Tank Battalion
- Tai'erzhuang, China: Special Tank Company of China Detachment Tank Unit
- Xuzhou, China: 1st Tank Battalion and 5th Tank Battalion
- Nomonhan, Manchukuo: 3rd Tank Regiment and 4th Tank Regiment
- Xinjing, Manchukuo: Armored unit of Imperial Manchukuo Army
- Nanjing, China: Armored unit of the Nanjing Regime
- Timor: IJA 38th Division Tankette Company
- Java: Anai Tankette unit, 2nd, 3rd and 48th Recon Regiment, Sakaguchi Detachment, 56th Infantry Group Tankette Unit
- Kwajalein Atoll: 2nd Battalion of Army 1st Sea-mobile Brigade

== Survivors ==
Type 94 tankette

- Australia
  - Treloar Resource Centre, Mitchell, Canberra
- China
  - Tank Museum, Changping District, Beijing
- Japan
  - Chichijima, Bonin Islands (3 turrets)
- Russia
  - Patriot Park, Kubinka, Odintsovsky District
- Taiwan
  - Armor Training Command R.O.C. Army, Hukou Township, Hsinchu County
- United Kingdom
  - The Wheatcroft Collection, Leicestershire, East Midlands

Type 97 pole planter

- Papua New Guinea
  - Kokopo War Museum, Kokopo, East New Britain Province

== Gallery ==
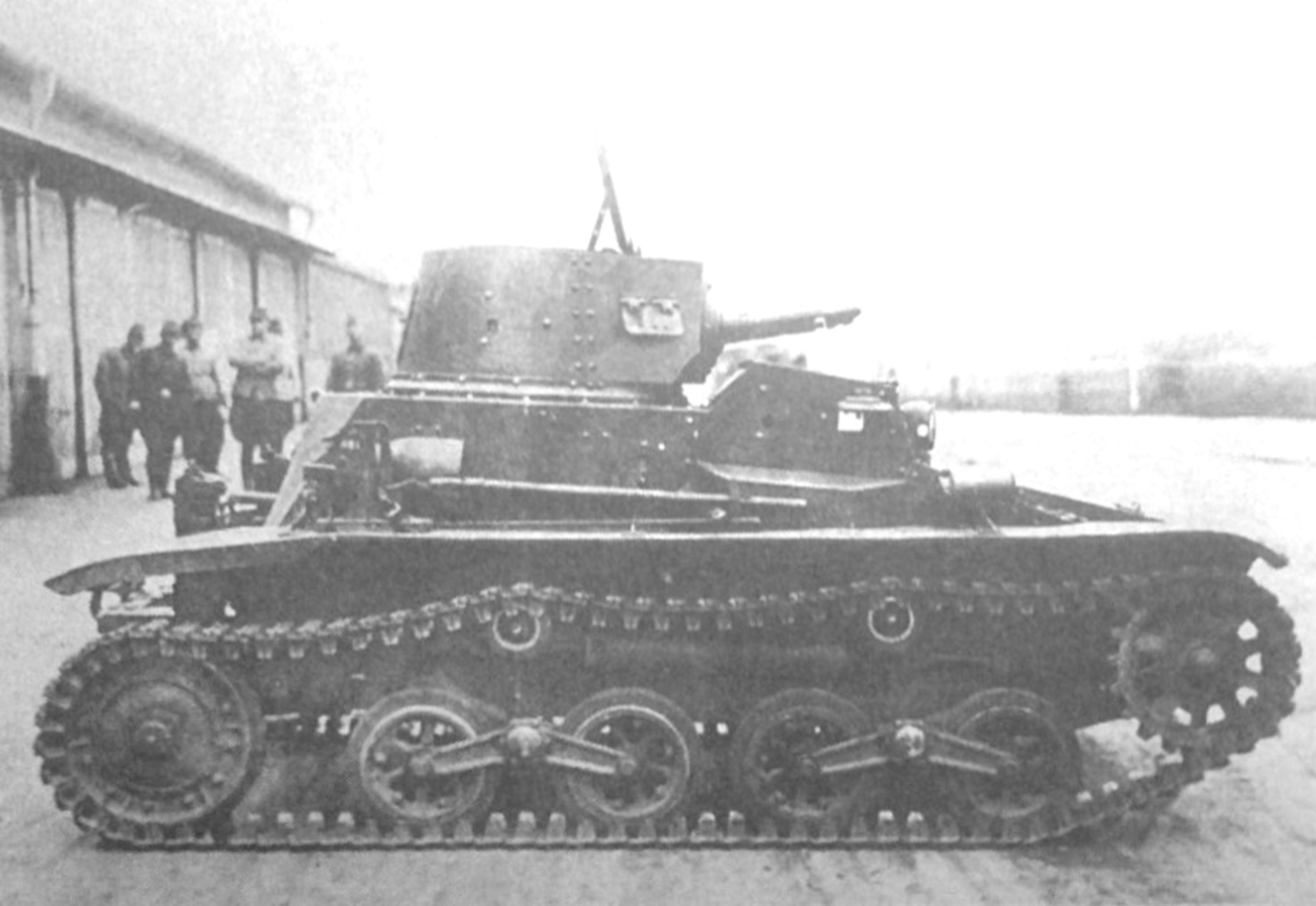
Late model Type 94 tankette

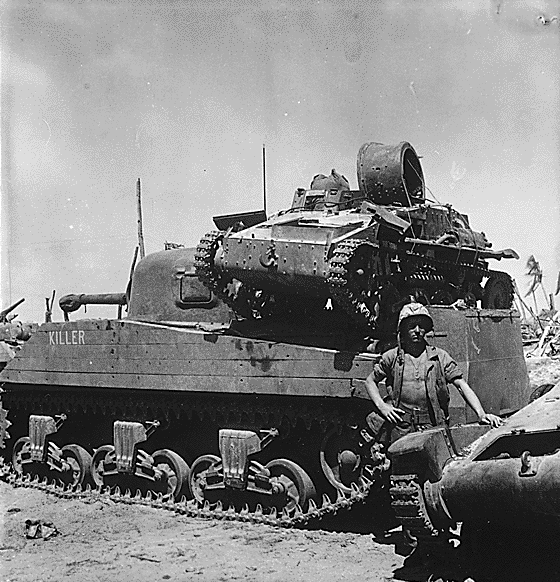
A captured Type 94 tankette with a damaged turret, on the engine deck of a USMC M4 Sherman tank at Kwajalein

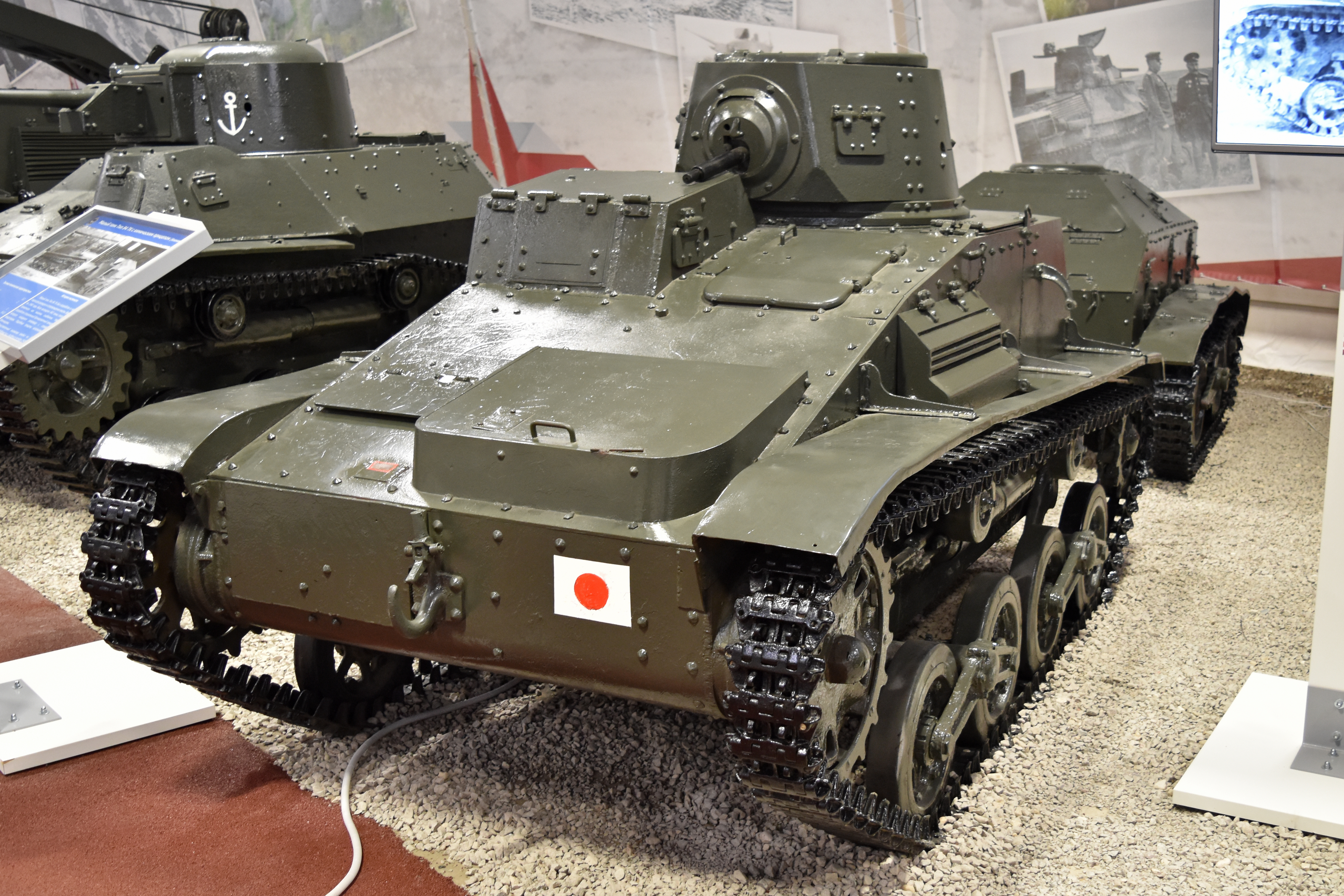
A Type 94 at Patriot Park, Russia.

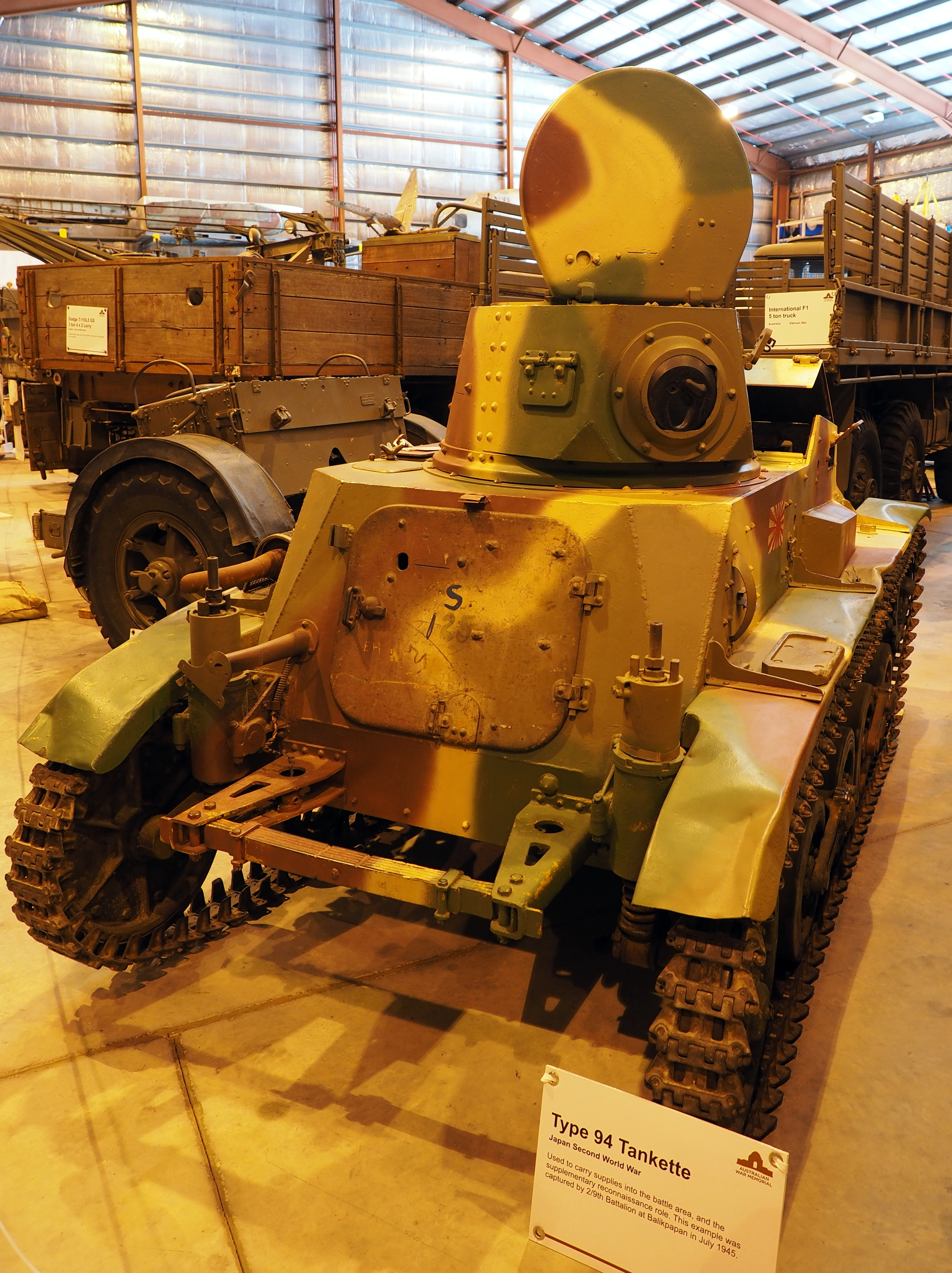
A Type 94 at the Treloar Resource Centre, Australia.

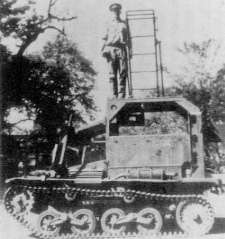
Type 97 pole planter

== Comparable vehicles ==
- Germany: Panzer I
- Italy: L3/35
- Romania: R-1
- Poland: TK-3 and TKS
- Soviet Union: T-27 • T-37A • T-38
- Sweden: Strv m/37
- United Kingdom: Light Tank Mk VI
