= T-23 tankette =

Soviet tankette

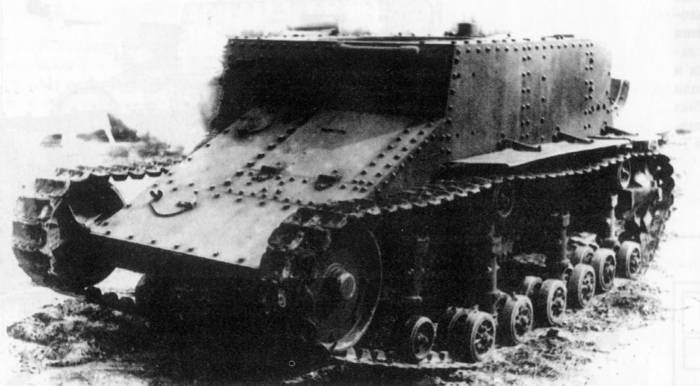
- Prototype T-23 Tankette
- Type: Tankette
- Place of origin: Soviet Union

Production history
- Designer: S. Ivanov
- Designed: 1929-30
- Produced: 1930
- No. built: 5

Specifications (T-23)
- Mass: 3.2 to 3.4 t (3.1 to 3.3 long tons; 3.5 to 3.7 short tons)
- Length: 3.35 m (11.0 ft)
- Width: 1.62 m (5 ft 4 in)
- Height: 1.5 m (4 ft 11 in)
- Crew: 2
- Armour: 6-10 mm
- Main armament: 1 x 7.62 mm (0 in) DT machine gun
- Engine: 4 cylinder, air cooled MS-2 (petrol); 60 hp (45 kW)
- Power/weight: 18.9 hp/tonne
- Suspension: sprung
- Ground clearance: 0.3 m (1 ft 0 in)
- Operational range: 190 km (120 mi)
- Maximum speed: 40 km/h (25 mph)

The T-23 was a prototype tankette developed by the Soviet Union during the interwar period. Only five examples of the vehicle were produced.

== Design history ==
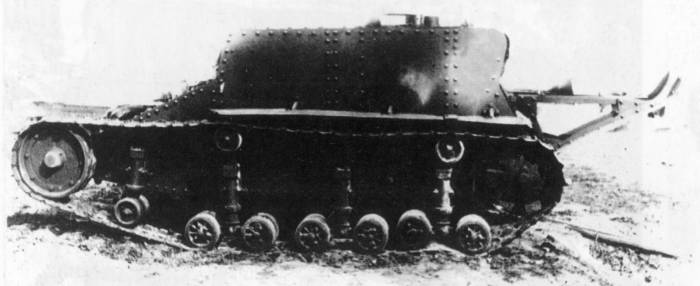
Side view of the T-23 showing the tail

The development of the T-23 began in 1929. The Red Army, now with experience from the earlier T-17 tankette, began development of the T-23. The design featured two crew members (placed on a row). The armour was made of riveted iron and was up to 10 mm thick on the front and sides of the vehicle. It was similar to the T-18 tank but lighter.

Many of the original design features of the tank were changed during the development. Originally the T-23 was to contain the same 35 hp four-cylinder engine as the T-18 light tank but this was eventually changed to a larger 60 hp version to enable it to reach speeds of up to 40 km/h (25 mph). The length of the tank was also increased by almost 30 cm (12 in) from original specifications. As built, the tank weighed between 3.2 and 3.4 t (3.1 and 3.3 long tons; 3.5 and 3.7 short tons), had a length of 283 cm (111 in), extending to 335 cm (132 in) with its tail. It was 162 cm (64 in) wide and 150 cm (59 in) high with a ground clearance of 30 cm (12 in). It had a range of between 100 and 190 km (62 and 118 mi). It was usually armed with a 7.62 mm (0 in) DT machine gun, although some examples were fitted with a 37 mm (1 in) anti-tank gun.

== Production ==
The T-23 never proceeded past the stage of a prototype. The design changes introduced to the tankette caused the price of production to rival that of the T-18 light tank itself, which had a much more powerful armament and a rotating turret. There were only five examples produced before the project was scrapped in favour of licensing the Carden Loyd tankette from the United Kingdom in 1930. This design was subsequently modified into the T-27 tankette and began full production in 1931.

== Sources ==
- Chamberlain, Pete (2002). Tanks of the World: 1915—1945. London: Cassell & Co. ISBN 978-0-30436-141-0.
- Novikov, M. S. (2020). "Танкетка Страны Советов — от идеи до реализации проекта. 1918–1932 гг" [Tankettes of the Soviet Union — from concept to project completion. 1918–1932]. Omsk Scientific Bulletin Series (in Russian). 5 (4): 16–24. doi:10.25206/2542-0488-2020-5-4-16-24.
