= Richard Peck (RAF officer) =

British Royal Air Force officer (1893–1952)

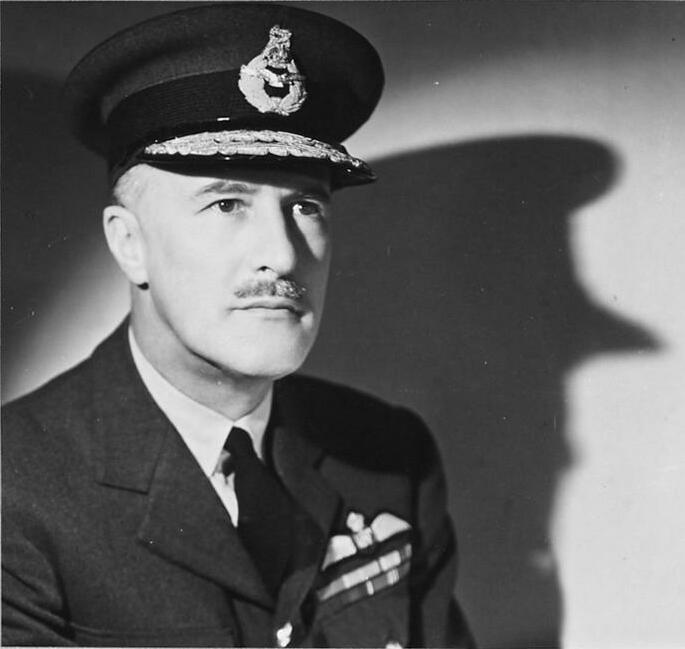
Peck as air marshal in 1943

Air Marshal Sir Richard Hallam Peck KCB (2 March 1893 – 12 September 1952) was a British officer in the Royal Air Force, who served in the First and Second World Wars.

== Biography ==
Peck was born in West Derby, Liverpool, and educated at St Paul's School, London and Brasenose College, Oxford. In the First World War he served in France with No 12 Squadron of the Royal Flying Corps. In 1919 he was commissioned as a Major. After the war he became a flight instructor and was stationed at RAF Iraq Command in 1922 and RAF Station Shaibah in 1924.

Peck attended the Army Staff College, Camberley in 1926 and the Imperial Defence College in 1933. In 1927 he joined the Air Staff and participated in the Experimental Mechanized Force. In 1935 he chaired the "Committee on the Defence of RAF Stations against Air Attack", which recommended an increase in resources. In 1936 he was stationed at RAF India.

During the Second World War, Peck was Director of Operations, Director-General of Operations, and Assistant Chief of the Air Staff (General). He was Lord Portal's primary public information deputy, and was often quoted in newspapers as an anonymous Air Ministry spokesman.

In 1940 Peck ensured the RAF ordered 50 de Havilland Mosquitos for reconnaissance. This was planned to be one of the fastest aircraft of its time, but there had been disagreements about its purpose and it was almost cancelled. Peck persuaded Wilfrid Freeman not to cancel, and it turned out to be an extremely versatile warplane which was used until the end of the war.

Peck was promoted to Air Marshal in 1942. He retired in 1946. He was a Governor of the BBC from 1946 to 1949, vice-chairman of the National Savings Committee in 1947, and he became president of the Royal Air Forces Association (RAFA) in 1949. He died in Switzerland from a heart attack aged 59. Richard Peck House, a RAFA rest home, was named after him.

== Publications ==
- Wing Commander R.H. Peck: "Aircraft in Small Wars (lecture)". Journal of the Royal United Services Institution, 73 (1928), pp. 535–50.
