= T-27 =

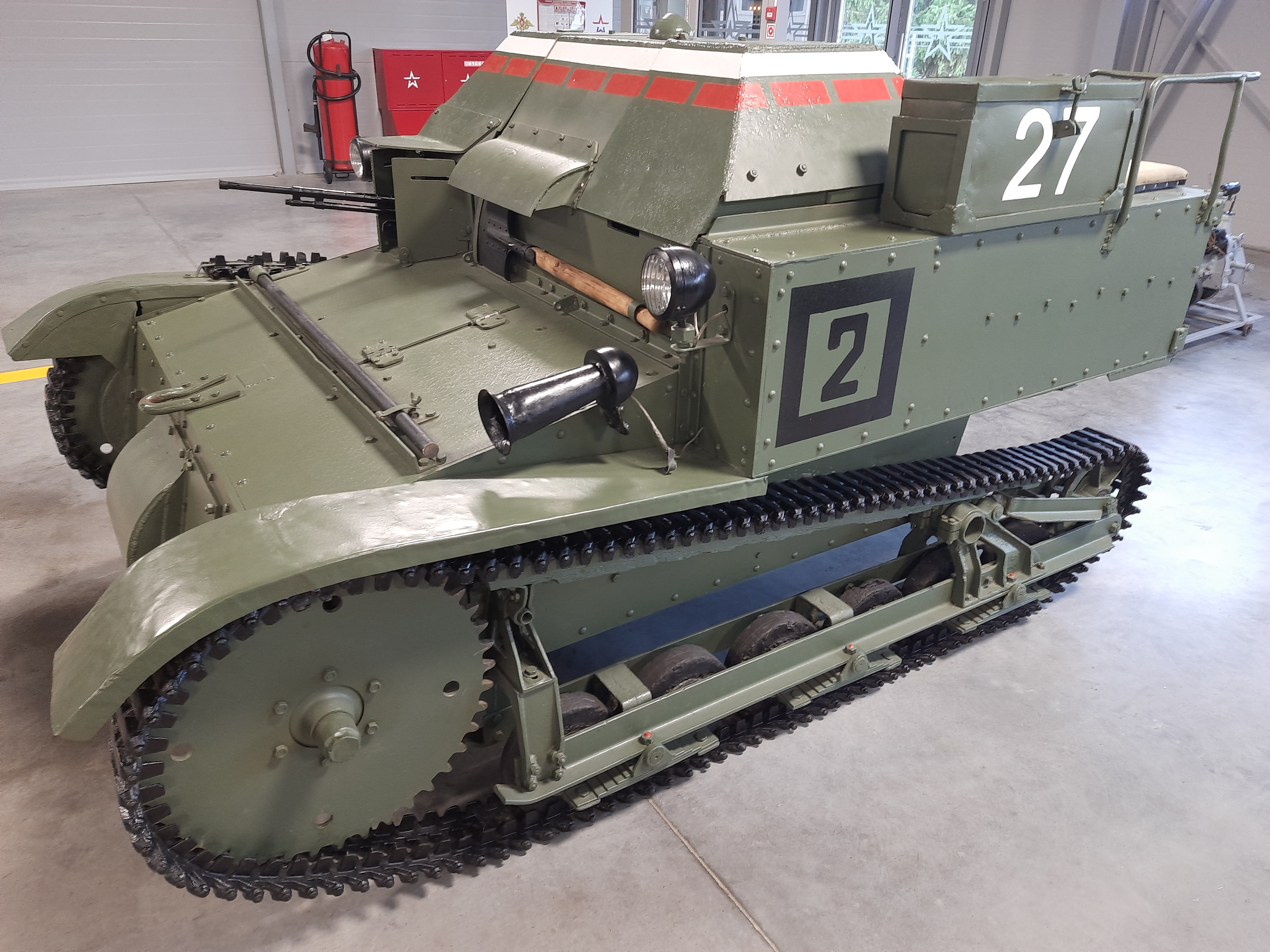
- A replica of the T-27 tankette on display in Kyiv, Ukraine
- Type: Tankette
- Place of origin: Soviet Union

Service history
- In service: 1931–1941
- Used by: Soviet Union (Kingdom of Hungary (1920–1946)) Hungary (captured); Turkey (Kingdom of Romania) Romania (captured)
- Wars: World War II

Production history
- Designer: Sir John Carden-Vivian Loyd, N. Kozyrev, Factory No. 37, Moscow
- Manufacturer: Bolshevik Factory, GAZ
- Produced: 1931–33
- No. built: 2,540
- Variants: T-27A

Specifications (T-27A)
- Mass: 2.7 tonnes
- Length: 2.60 m (8 ft 6 in)
- Width: 1.83 m (6 ft 0 in)
- Height: 1.44 m (4 ft 9 in)
- Crew: 2
- Armour: 6–10 mm (0.24–0.39 in)
- Main armament: 7.62mm DT machine gun (with 2,520 rounds)
- Engine: GAZ-AA; 40 hp (30 kW)
- Power/weight: 15 hp/tonne
- Suspension: bogie
- Fuel capacity: 46 l
- Operational range: 120 km (75 mi)
- Maximum speed: 42 km/h (26 mph)

The T-27 was a tankette produced in the 1930s by the Soviet Union. It was based on the design of the Carden Loyd tankette, bought under license from the United Kingdom in 1930.

== Design ==
The Soviets were not fully satisfied with the Carden Loyd design and made a number of changes before putting it into mass production under the designation of T-27. Compared with the British original, the hull was larger, the running gear was improved and the weapon mount was modified to take a Soviet 7.62 mm DT machine gun. A number of other changes were made by Chief Engineer N. Kozyrev and Lead Engineer K. Sirken to improve the tankette's ability to cope with the Russian climate and terrain. It lacked any communication devices, as communication between vehicles was intended to be carried out using signal flags.

== Service ==
The tankette was accepted into service on February 13, 1931. It was manufactured in two factories simultaneously, the Bolshevik factory in Leningrad and what would later become the GAZ factory in Nizhni Novgorod.

The principal use of the T-27 during its service life was as a reconnaissance vehicle. Initially, 65 tankette battalions were formed by the Red Army, with each having about 50 tankettes. This figure was later reduced to 23 per battalion. The tankette was also intended to be air-mobile. In 1935, the Soviets experimented with transporting T-27s by air, by suspending them under the fuselages of Tupolev TB-3 bombers.

The T-27 saw active service in the Soviet republics of Central Asia during the 1930s, where the tankettes were used in campaigns against basmachis. However, they fairly quickly became obsolete due to the introduction of more advanced tanks. The Red Army found them reliable and simple to operate, but the T-27 coped poorly with swampy and snowy terrain due to the narrowness of its tracks. It was also difficult to find crews, as the tankettes were so small that it was difficult to find crews of sufficiently diminutive stature. By the end of the 1930s the T-27 was relegated primarily to training use, with some being used as tractors to tow field guns.

Ten T-27s were captured by Hungarian forces during the fighting on the Eastern Front.

Five T-27s were ordered by Turkey in 1935, alongside 60 T-26s.

Two T-27 tankettes were captured by Romanian forces as of 1 November 1942.

== Variants ==
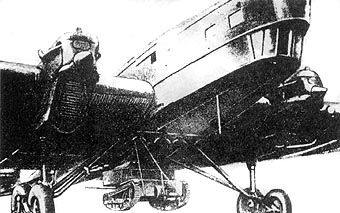
A TB-3 bomber carrying a T-27

Some experiments were also made to equip T-27s with more advanced weapons, such as flamethrowers and recoilless guns, but these did not prove successful. A few T-27s were pressurized and provided with special equipment to enable them to cross rivers underwater. It was also the first Soviet tracked vehicle transported by plane (a single tankette could be mounted below the fuselage of the TB-3 bomber).

== See also ==
=== Comparable vehicles ===
- Czechoslovakia/Romania: R-1
- Germany: Panzer I
- Italy: L3/33 and L3/35
- Japan: Type 94
- Poland: TK-3 and TKS
- Soviet Union: T-37A and T-38
- Sweden: Strv m/37
- United Kingdom: Carden Loyd tankette

== Sources ==
- Zaloga, Steven J.; James Grandsen (1984). Soviet Tanks and Combat Vehicles of World War Two. London: Arms and Armour Press. ISBN 0-85368-606-8.
