= L3/33 =

Tankette used by the Italian Army before and during World War II

Carro Armato L3/33
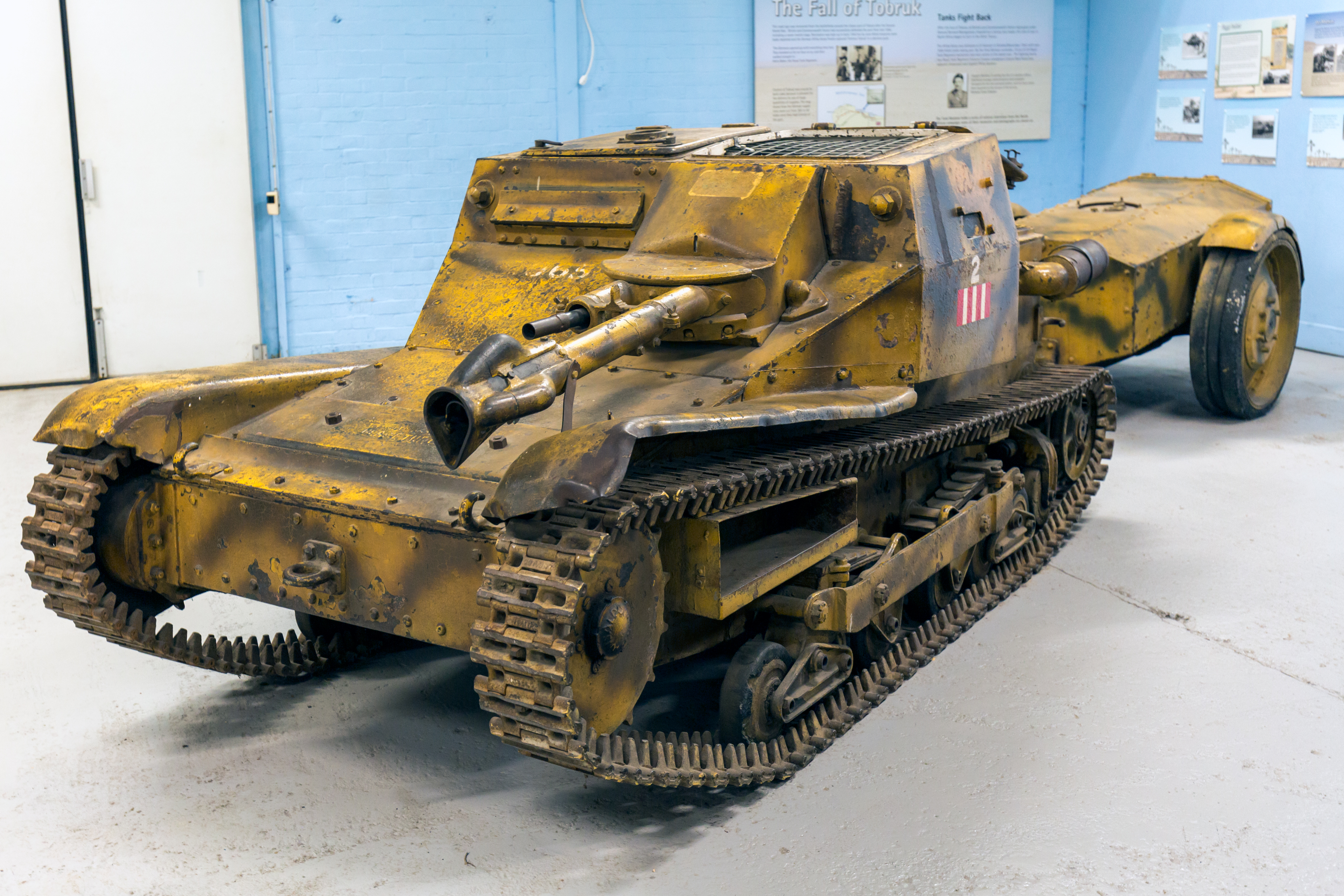
- Flamethrower variant of L3/33 (CV-33) at The Tank Museum, Bovington
- Type: Tankette
- Place of origin: Italy

Service history
- In service: 1933–1945
- Used by: Italy and others
- Wars: Austrian Civil War; Second Italo-Abyssinian War; Spanish Civil War; Second Sino-Japanese War; Slovak–Hungarian War; Invasion of Albania; Second World War; Anglo-Iraqi War; Chinese Civil War

Production history
- Designer: Ansaldo
- Unit cost: 89,890 lires in 1933
- Produced: 1933–1935
- No. built: 1,200 L3/33; 1,300 L3/35
- Variants: L3/35, L3 CC, L3 LF

Specifications
- Mass: 2.7 t (2.7 long tons; 3.0 short tons)
- Length: 3.03 m (9 ft 11 in)
- Width: 1.4 m (4 ft 7 in)
- Height: 1.2 m (3 ft 11 in)
- Crew: 2 (commander and driver)
- Armour: 6–12 mm (0.24–0.47 in)
- Main armament: 1 × 6.5mm machine gun on L3 CC: 1 × 20mm Fucile Controcarri S Mod.39 on L3 LF: Flamethrower
- Engine: FIAT-SPA CV3 water-cooled 43 hp (32 kW)
- Power/weight: 15.9/t
- Suspension: Bogie
- Operational range: 110 km (68 mi)
- Maximum speed: 42 km/h (26 mph)

The Carro Veloce 33 (CV 33) or L3/33 was a tankette originally built in 1933 and used by the Italian Army before and during World War II. It was based on the imported British Carden Loyd tankette (license-built by Italy as the CV 29). Many CV 33s were retrofitted to meet the specifications of the CV 35 in 1935. In 1938, the CV 33 was renamed the "L3/33" while the CV 35 became the "L3/35s."

The original CV 33 carried a two-man crew protected by 12 mm of welded armour and was armed with a single 6.5 mm machine gun.

The L3/33 saw action in China, Spain, France, the Balkans, North Africa, Italian East Africa, Italy, and Russia.

== Variants ==
=== L3/33 CC ===
The L3/33 CC (Contro Carro, literally "Anti Tank") was based on the L3 tankette. A small number of L3/33s and 35s had their 6.5mm machine guns replaced by a Fucile Controcarri S Mod.39 (20 mm) anti-tank gun, creating an ad-hoc tank destroyer platform. Arriving too late to see action in Libya before the Axis retreat of the area, they saw only limited action in Tunisia in late 1942.

=== L3 LF ===
Development of the "L3 LF" (LanciaFiamme, "flamethrower") flame tank, based on the L3 tankette, began in 1935. The flamethrower nozzle replaced the machine gun, and the flame fuel was carried in an armoured trailer towed by the vehicle. Later versions had the fuel carried in a box-shaped tank mounted above the L3's engine compartment. The vehicle weighed 3.2 tons, and the armoured trailer carried 500 L (110 imp gal; 130 US gal) of fuel. It had a range of 40 m (130 ft), though other sources report a 100 m (330 ft) range. They were fielded in North Africa, although there is no record of them being involved in combat there.

The L3 Lf saw action in the Second Italo–Abyssinian War, Spain, France, Russia, the Balkans, Italian North Africa and Italian East Africa.

=== Artillery tractor ===
Footage exists of an unarmed, open-topped, artillery tractor based on the L3. This could be used to tow a tracked trailer, as could the L3, as well as light artillery pieces, including a 100mm mountain howitzer. This vehicle does not appear to have entered production. Further analysis of the footage however revealed the open-topped vehicle as to the "Ansaldo Light Tractor Prototype" (1931). In the video, the "Ansaldo Light Tank Prototype (1931)" also appears. These vehicles were the predecessors of the L3/33, as those were the "stepping stone" from the Carro Veloce 29 to the Carro Veloce 33.

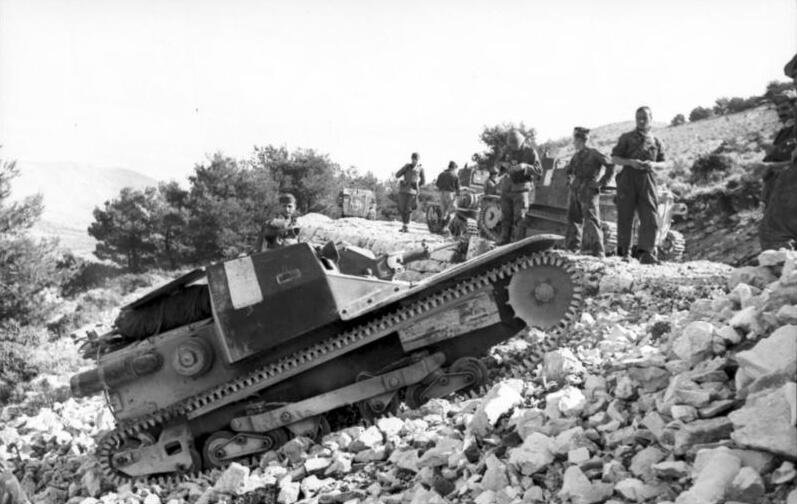
L3/33 in Greece.

== Operators ==
- Austria: 36 delivered in 1935.
- Afghanistan
- Bulgaria: 14, known as Ansaldo-Fiat, received in 1934.
- Taiwan
- Croatia: the Ustashe Militia received 6 Italian tankettes in 1941 while the Army received 10 from Hungary in 1942.
- Hungary: the Royal Hungarian Army received 30 in 1934.
- Iraq
- Italy
- Nicaragua
- Spain
- Albania

In the 1930s, the Kingdom of Romania intended to strengthen its armored forces and contacted multiple nations to attempt acquisitions. One of the countries contacted was Italy, who offered to present the CV 33 in 1935. However, the presentation never took place and Romania acquired vehicles from other countries (see Romanian armored fighting vehicle production during World War II).

== Survivors ==
One example of the L3/33 is on display in the Australian War Memorial in Canberra, Australia. It is believed this example was captured by British and Commonwealth troops in North Africa in 1940 or 1941. There is also a flame thrower variant on display at The Tank Museum in Bovington. There is also an example on a plinth at 305 Corps HQ at Kandahar Air Field, Afghanistan. A former Chinese Nationalist operated example, captured by the Communists in 1949, is on display at the Chinese People's Revolution Military Museum in Beijing. One example captured by the Yugoslav Partisans during World War II is on open display of the Belgrade Military Museum in Serbia.

At least one example was in running order in 2014.

== See also ==
=== Comparable vehicles ===
- France: AMR 35
- Germany: Panzer I
- Italy: L3/35
- Japan: Type 94
- Romania: R-1
- Poland: TK-3 and TKS
- Soviet Union: T-27 • T-37A • T-38
- Sweden: Strv m/37
- United Kingdom: Light Tank Mk VI
- United States M1 combat car • Marmon–Herrington CTLS
