= Tankette =

Small tracked armoured fighting vehicle

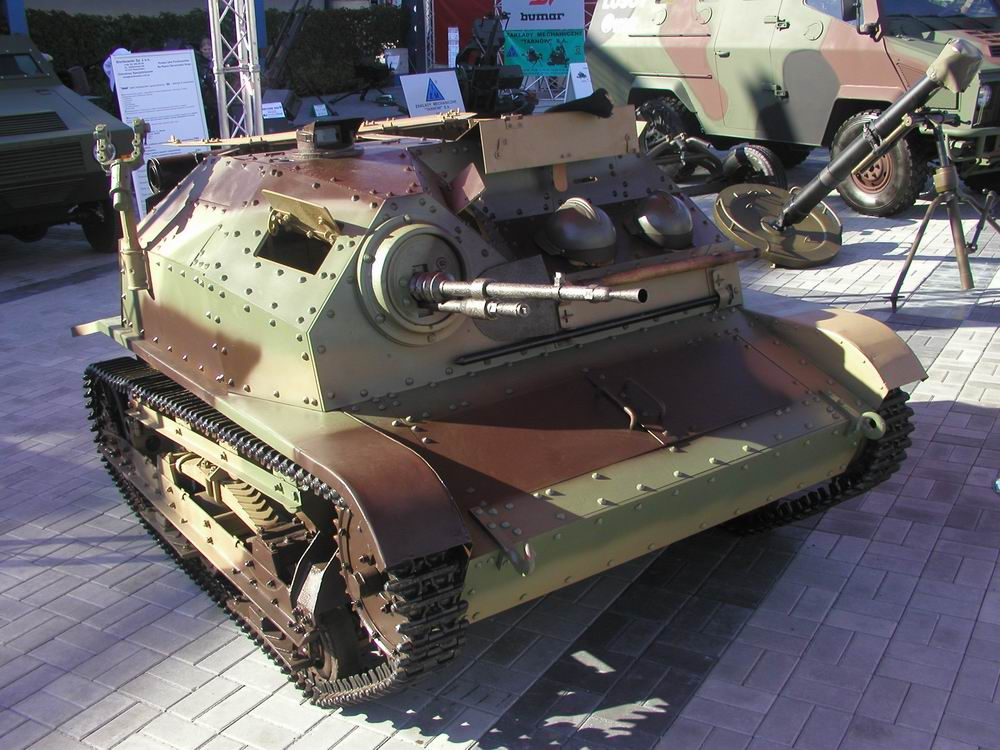
A TKS tankette in the Polish Army Museum

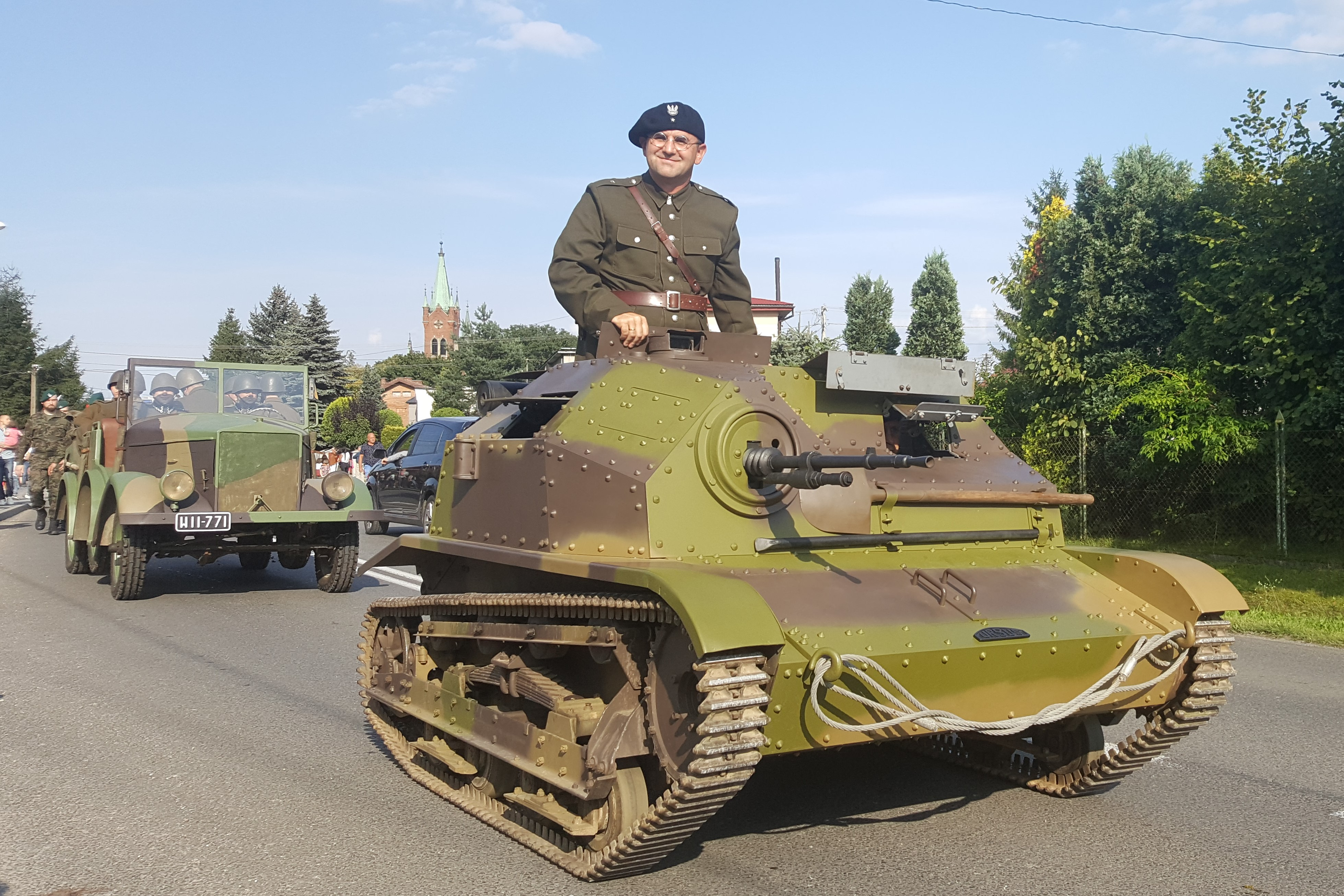
A TKS tankette with a human for scale in a 2019 parade in Poland

A tankette is a tracked armoured fighting vehicle that resembles a small tank, roughly the size of a car. It is mainly intended for light infantry support and scouting. Colloquially it may also simply mean a small tank.

Several countries built tankettes between the 1920s and 1940s, and some saw limited combat in the early phases of World War II. The vulnerability of their light armour, however, eventually led armies to abandon the concept with some exceptions such as the more modern German Wiesel (Weasel) series.

== Characteristics ==
Tankettes were made both in two- and three-man models. Some were so low that the occupant had to lie prone. Some models were not equipped with turrets (and together with the tracked mobility, this is often seen as defining the concept), or just a very simple turret that was traversed by hand or leg. They were significantly smaller than light tanks and did not have a tank gun; instead their main weapon tended to be one or two machine guns or, rarely, a 20 mm autocannon or grenade launcher.

== History ==
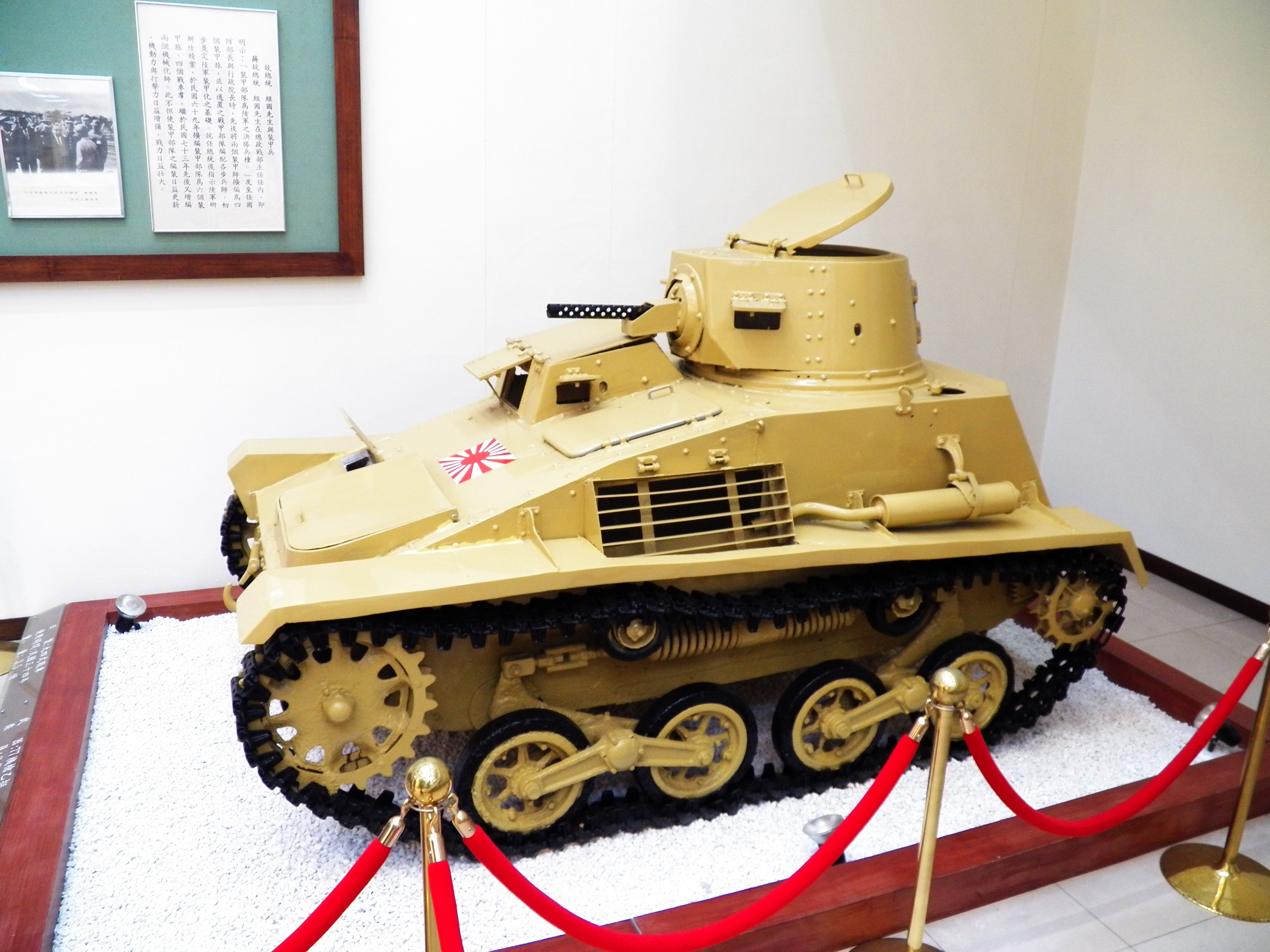
A Japanese Type 94 tankette

The genesis of the tankette concept was the armoured warfare of World War I. On the Western Front in the later stage of the war, Allied tanks could break through the enemy trench lines but the infantry (needed to take and hold the ground gained) following the tanks were easily stopped or delayed by small arms fire and artillery. The breakthrough tanks were then isolated and destroyed, and reinforcements plugged the hole in the trench line. The tankette was originally conceived in the early interwar period to solve this problem. The first designs were a sort of mobile, one-man machine gun nest protected against small arms fire and shell fragments. This idea was abandoned and the two man-model, mainly intended for reconnaissance, was produced instead. The moving up of infantry while protecting them was solved with the development of the armoured personnel carrier concept in the 1930s.

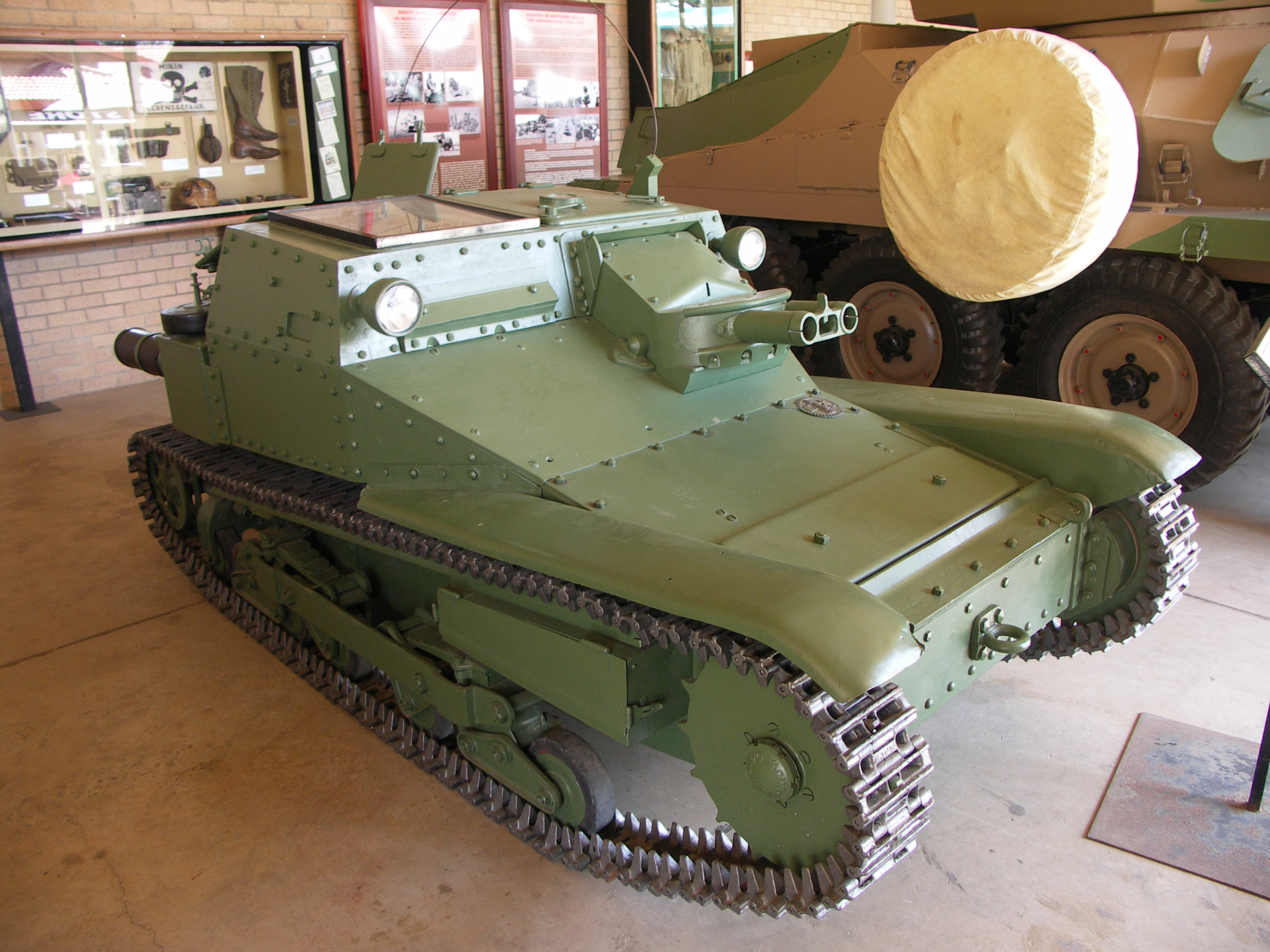
An Italian Carro Leggero 3/35 (L3/35) light tank

In 1925 British tank pioneer Giffard Le Quesne Martel built a one-man tank in his garage and showed it to the War Office, who agreed to production of a few (known as the Morris-Martel) for testing. The publicity caused John Carden and Vivian Loyd to produce their own. Both types were developed further, but the two-man Carden Loyd tankette was considered the classic and most successful design, with many other tankettes modelled after it. While the design was influential, few Carden Loyd tankettes saw combat, other than those the Bolivian side used during the Chaco War. However, the design did lead to the 'Bren Gun Carrier' which in final form as the Universal Carrier had an extensive operational history in the Second World War. In 1928, the British Army Council objected to the use of the word "tankette," noting that the "mechanization of the Army" was still in its infancy.

The Italian Royal Army (Regio Esercito) equipped three armoured divisions and three "fast" (celere) divisions with L3/33 and L3/35 tankettes. The L3s were used in large numbers during the Italian invasion of Ethiopia, the Spanish Civil War, and almost every place Italian soldiers fought during World War II. Some L3s went with the Italian Expeditionary Corps in Russia (Corpo di Spedizione Italiano, CSIR) as late as Operation Barbarossa.

The French armoured reconnaissance type (automitrailleuses de reconnaissance, "machine-gun scout") of the 1930s was essentially a tankette in form, specifically intended for scouting ahead of the main force.

In 1935, the Soviets experimented with transporting T-27s by air, suspending one under the fuselage of a Tupolev TB-3 heavy bomber.

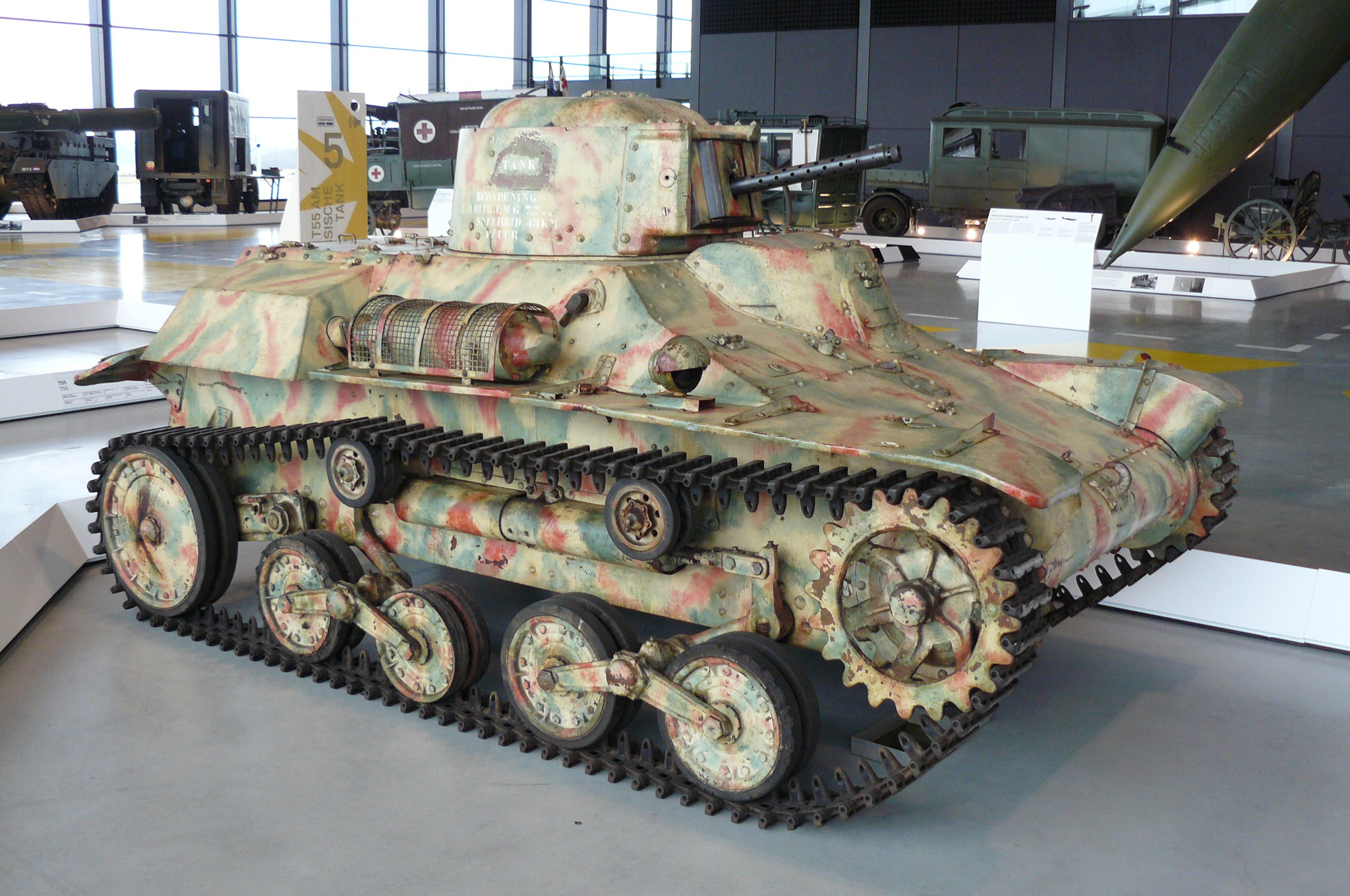
A Japanese Type 97 Te-Ke tankette

The Imperial Japanese Army (IJA) became one of the most prolific users of tankettes, producing a number of designs for reconnaissance and infantry support in Second Sino-Japanese War and jungle warfare. However, by the time of the Second World War, many were already obsolete and some were proven unsuccessful in their appointed task. Many were relegated to tractor duties for artillery or logistics units.

Due to their limited utility and vulnerability to anti-tank weapons (even machine guns), the tankette concept was abandoned, and their role largely taken over by armoured cars.

However, in Vietnam, the US Marines employed the similar, somewhat larger, M50 Ontos tank destroyer with some success.

The 1980s saw the renaissance of a similar concept in the German Wiesel AWC, introduced to provide airborne troops with armoured reconnaissance capability; while these are called "armoured weapons carriers", they fit the definition of a tankette.

== Examples ==
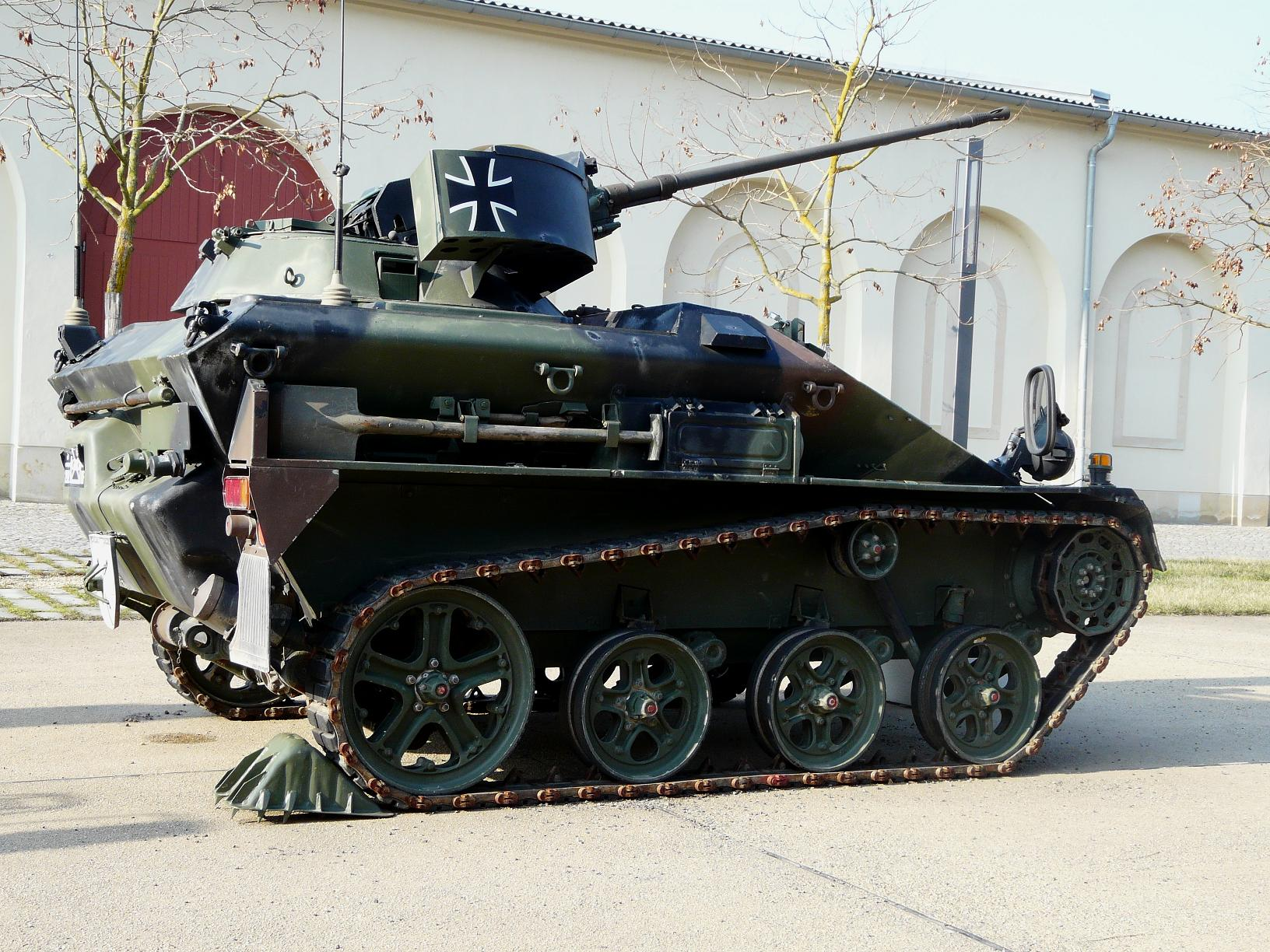
A Wiesel 1 tankette

- Czechoslovakia
  - AH-IV
  - Skoda MU-4
  - Tančík vz. 33
- France
  - Renault UE Chenillette
- Nazi Germany
  - Panzer I -Although classified as a light tank, most sub-variants fit the designation of a tankette
- West Germany
  - Wiesel 1 and Wiesel 2 -similar modern German armoured and tracked weapon carrier systems
- Italy
  - L3/33
  - L3/35
- Japan
  - Type 92 Jyu-Sokosha
  - Type 94 tankette
  - Type 97 Te-Ke
- Poland
  - TKS/TK-3
- Romania
  - R-1
- Soviet Union
  - T-17
  - T-23
  - T-27
  - PPG tankette
- United Kingdom
  - Carden Loyd
  - Morris-Martel
- United States
  - Marmon-Herrington CTLS - not officially designated tankettes
  - Ford 3-Ton M1918

== See also ==
- Infantry fighting vehicle
- Tank classification
- FV101 Scorpion
