= Oldřichov =

Oldřichov may refer to places in the Czech Republic:

- Oldřichov (Přerov District), a municipality and village in the Olomouc Region
- Oldřichov (Tábor District), a municipality and village in the South Bohemian Region
- Oldřichov, a village and part of Dobev in the South Bohemian Region
- Oldřichov, a village and part of Jeníkov (Teplice District) in the Ústí nad Labem Region
- Oldřichov, a village and part of Nejdek in the Karlovy Vary Region
- Oldřichov, a village and part of Tachov in the Plzeň Region
- Oldřichov na Hranicích, a village and part of Hrádek nad Nisou in the Liberec Region
- Oldřichov v Hájích, a municipality and village in the Liberec Region
- Nový Oldřichov, a municipality and village in the Liberec Region
