= AH-IV =

Chechoslovak tankette/light tank

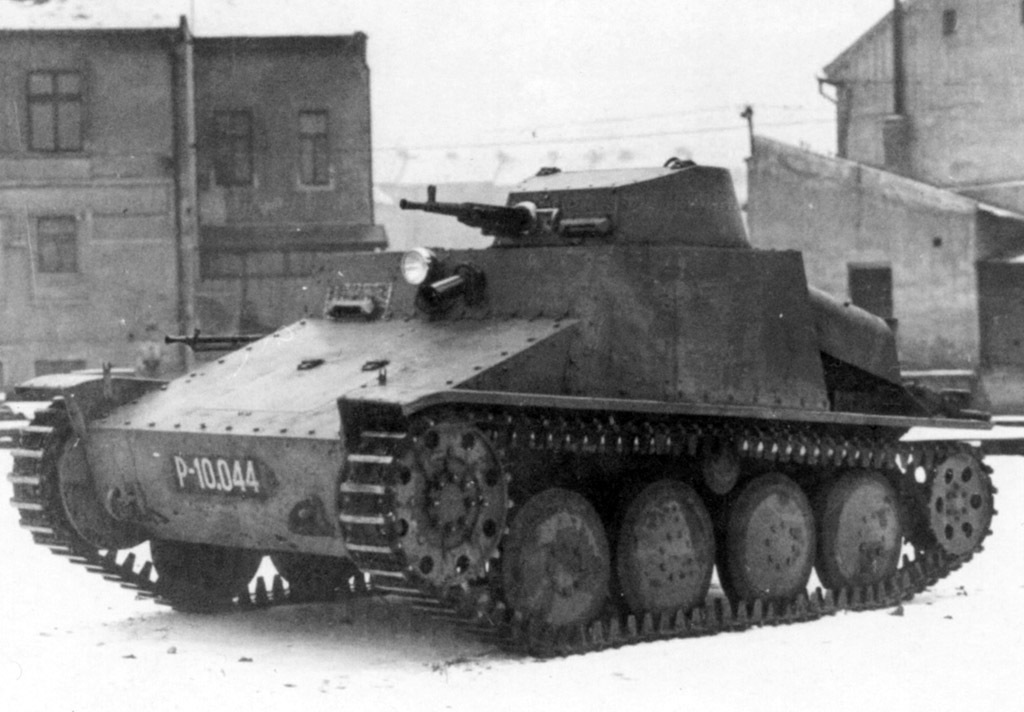
- The original AH-IV prototype. It was different compared to the production vehicles of Romania, Sweden, etc., which had bigger turrets among other modifications.
- Type: Tankette/light tank
- Place of origin: Czechoslovakia

Service history
- In service: 1934−85?
- Used by: See users
- Wars: World War II, Eritrean War of Independence, Ethiopian Civil War, Ogaden War, 1982 Ethiopian–Somali Border War

Production history
- Designer: ČKD
- Designed: 1935−37
- Manufacturer: ČKD, Malaxa
- Produced: 1936−39, 1949−50
- No. built: 155 + 4 prototypes (Czechoslovakia); 46 (Sweden, Strv m/37); 1 (Romania, R-1)
- Variants: R-1, RH, Strv m/37, AH-IV-Hb, TACAM R-1

Specifications (Original AH-IV prototype)
- Mass: 3 tonnes (3.0 long tons; 3.3 short tons)
- Length: 3.2 m (10 ft 6 in)
- Width: 1.73 m (5 ft 8 in)
- Height: 1.67 m (5 ft 6 in)
- Crew: 2
- Armor: 5–10 mm (0.20–0.39 in)
- Main armament: 1 x 7.92 mm (0.312 in) ZB vz. 35 heavy machine gun
- Secondary armament: 1 x 7.92 mm (0.312 in) ZB vz. 26 machine gun
- Engine: Praga AH; 46 horsepower (34 kW)
- Suspension: leaf spring
- Operational range: 150 km (93 mi)
- Maximum speed: 40 km/h (25 mph)

The AH-IV was a Czechoslovak-designed export armored fighting vehicle, classed as either a tankette or light tank, used by Romania during World War II, but having also been acquired by neutral Sweden and Iran. Modified AH-IV versions were built under license by Romania (R-1) and Sweden (Strv m/37). The Romanian vehicles saw action on the Eastern Front from Operation Barbarossa to the Vienna offensive. Twenty vehicles were sold after the war to Ethiopia, who used them until the 1980s.

== Description ==
Českomoravská Kolben-Daněk (ČKD) was determined not to repeat the problems of its earlier Tančík vz. 33 tankette and gave the gunner a turret for better observation and all-around fields of fire for its new AH-IV tankette. It was assembled from a framework of steel "angle iron" beams, to which armor plates between 12 and 6 mm (0.47 and 0.24 in) thick were bolted. The driver sat on the right side using an observation port protected by bulletproof glass and an armored shutter. To his right was a small vision slit. Also to his right, in all models except the Swedish Strv m/37, was a Zbrojovka Brno ZB vz. 26 or ZB vz. 30 light machine gun that was usually locked in place and fired using a Bowden cable. The gunner sat on the left and manned a small turret fitted with a ZB vz. 35 or ZB vz. 37 machine gun in a ball mount. Most of the machine gun's barrel protruded from the mount and was protected by an armored trough. He had a large vision port to the right of the machine gun mount in the turret and a small vision slit on the left side of the superstructure. 3700 rounds were carried for the two machine guns. No radio was fitted on the AH-IV, though its Swedish version, the Stridsvagn m/37, carried a radio.

The 3.468 L (211.6 cu in), water-cooled, six-cylinder Praga engine produced 55 hp (41 kW) at 2,500 rpm. It sat in the rear of the fighting compartment and drove the transmission via a drive shaft that ran forward between the driver and commander to the gearbox. Cooling was designed to draw air in through the commander's and driver's hatches. This had the advantage of rapidly dispersing gun combustion gases when firing, but several disadvantages. The constant draft generated by the engine greatly affected the crew during cold weather, an engine fire would force the crew to evacuate and the engine noise and heat increased crew fatigue. It had a top speed on the road of 45 km/h (28 mph) and a range between 150 and 170 km (93 and 106 mi). The semi-automatic Praga-Wilson transmission had five forward gears and one reverse gear to drive the forward-mounted drive sprocket. The suspension was a smaller version of that used in the Panzer 38(t) - a Czech design built after German occupation. It consisted of four large road wheels per side, each pair mounted on a wheel carrier and sprung by leaf springs. There were two wheel carriers per side. The idler wheel was at the rear and one return roller was fitted. It had a ground pressure of only 0.5 kg/cm^{2}. It could cross a ditch 1.5 m (4 ft 11 in) wide, climb an obstacle 0.5 to 0.6 m (20 to 24 in) high and ford a stream 0.8 m (2 ft 7 in) deep.

== Variants ==
=== Iran: RH (AH-IV-P) ===
Iran was the first customer for the AH-IV and ordered fifty plus a prototype in 1935 for delivery the following year. Deliveries began in August 1936 with the last batch arriving in Iran in May 1937, although the armament was shipped separately and was not installed until November 1937. The Iranians were well pleased with their vehicles and planned to order between 100 and 300 additional AH-IVs, but the outbreak of World War II prevented any follow-through. Their tankettes were the smallest of the series at only 3.5 tonnes (3.4 long tons; 3.9 short tons) and differed only slightly in size from the Romanian R-1 tankettes that followed it on the production lines. It could only climb an obstacle 0.5 metres (1.6 ft) high, had a range of 150 kilometres (93 mi) and a ground pressure of only 0.45 kg/cm^{2}. It used the ZB vz. 26 and 35 machine guns.

=== Romania: R-1 (AH-IV-R) ===
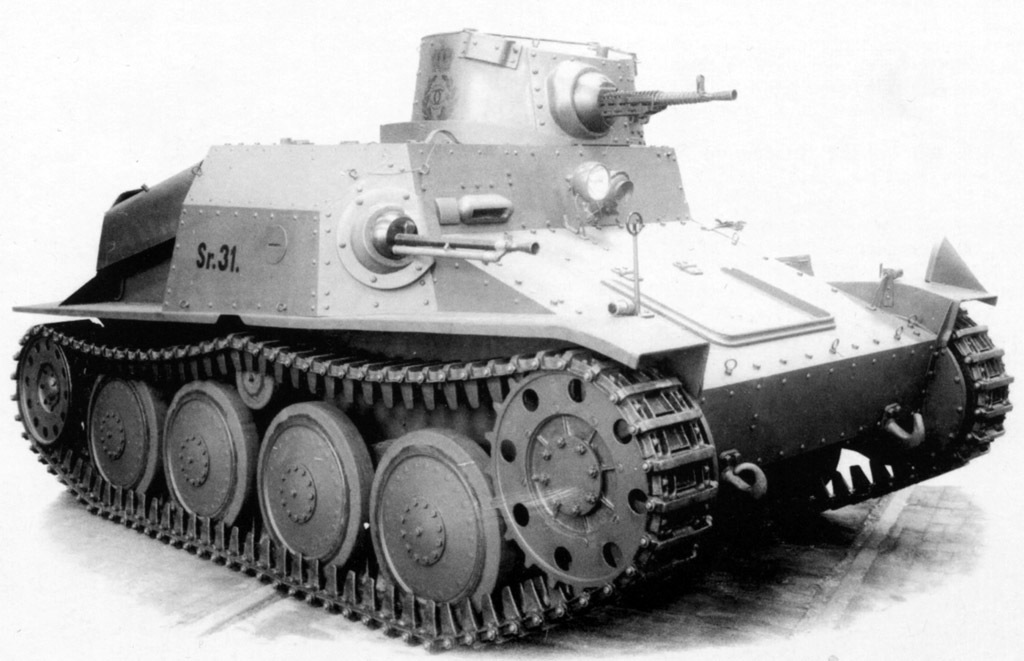
Romanian R-1

The Romanians signed a contract for 36 AH-IV-R, as they were designated by ČKD, on 14 August 1936, including one prototype to be delivered in two months and the entire order in seven months. These deadlines could not be met as the Romanians demanded many changes, which all had to be made on the production line because ČKD had initiated production of the entire order before the prototype was accepted. The first ten tankettes off the production line were sent to Romania in October 1937 to participate in the autumn maneuvers when they made a favorable impression before being returned to the factory. The production run was completed the next month, but the Romanians refused to accept them as they did not conform to the specifications. The required modifications took until April 1938 to perform, but another evaluation was required under summer conditions and they were not formally accepted until August 1938. Nicolae Malaxa bought a license to produce the R-1 as the AH-IV-R was known in Romanian service, in September 1938, but irregularities and disputes over payment delayed the transfer of the production drawings until October 1939. His factory built one prototype, mostly from R-1 spare parts, but never began production.

=== Sweden: Strv m/37 (AH-IV-Sv) ===
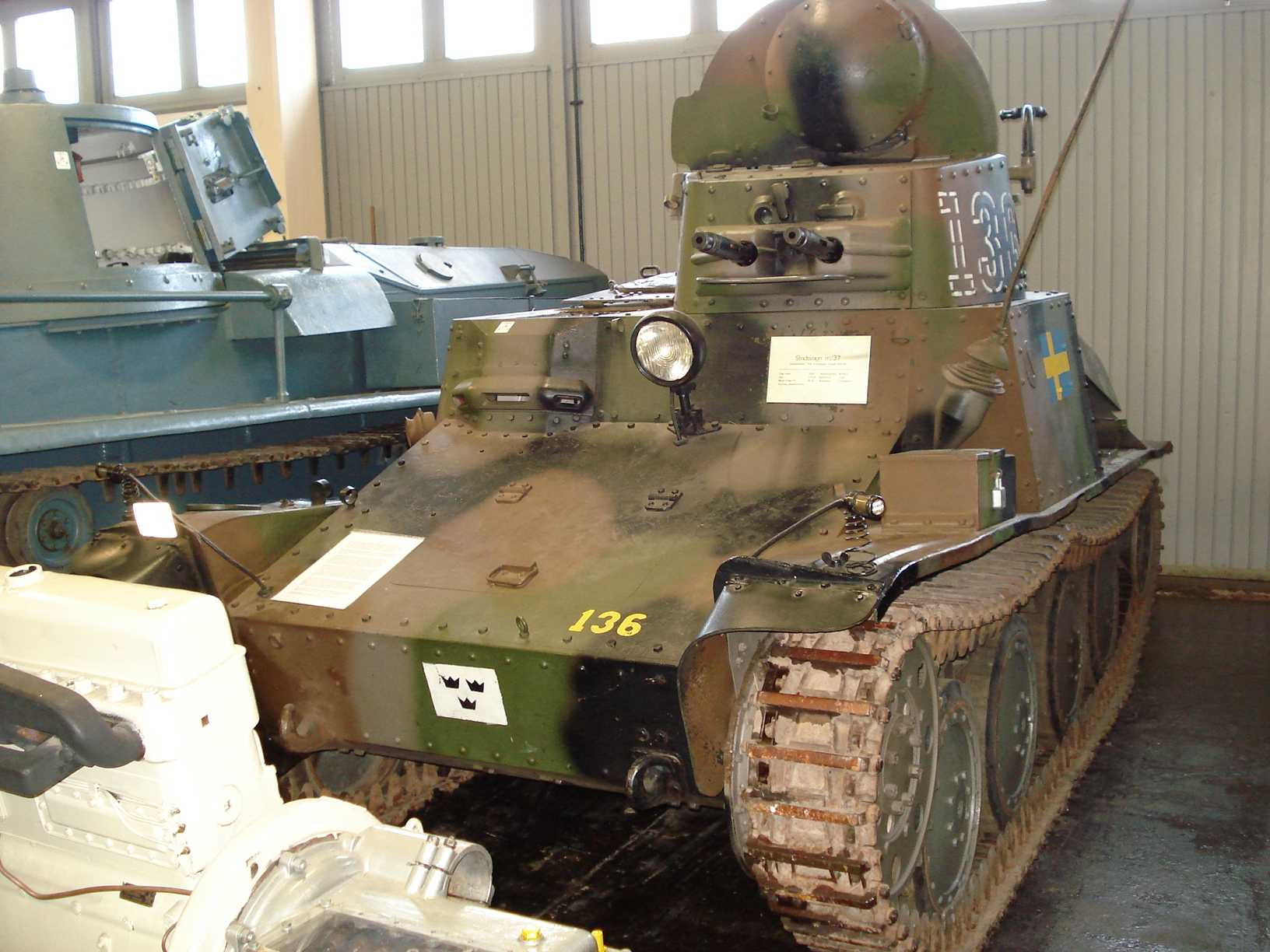
Stridsvagn m/37 on display at Swedish Army Museum in Stockholm, Sweden.

Sweden ordered forty-eight tankettes in 1937 as the Stridsvagn m/37 (Strv m/37) after a successful demonstration during winter conditions in the Krkonoše Mountains. They were to be assembled in Oskarshamn with a more powerful 4.39 litres (268 cu in), water-cooled, six-cylinder, 85 horsepower (63 kW) Volvo FC-CKD gasoline engine and armor, up to 15 millimetres (0.59 in) thick, from Avesta, although ČKD supplied most of the other components after building one prototype. The vehicle was heavily modified with the driver's machine gun deleted and proved to be the heaviest and largest version of the AH-IV at 4.68 tonnes (4.61 long tons; 5.16 short tons) and a length of 3.4 metres (11 ft), a width of 1.85 metres (6.1 ft) and 1.96 metres (6.4 ft) high. Its turret mounted two Swedish 8 mm (0.31 in) Ksp m/36 strv machine guns and had a small observation cupola on its top. It carried a radio and 3,960 rounds for its machine guns. It had a maximum speed of 60 kilometres per hour (37 mph) and a range of 200 kilometres (120 mi). It could ford a stream up to 0.9 metres (3.0 ft) in depth. The last components were shipped in November 1938.

=== Ethiopia: AH-IV-Hb ===
Ethiopia ordered twenty AH-IV-Hb tankettes on 24 June 1948. In form these reverted to the driver's machine gun and single machine gun in the turret but were of welded construction rather than riveted. They used a 4.94 litres (301 cu in), air-cooled Tatra 114 diesel engine that produced 65 horsepower (48 kW) at 2200 rpm. This gave the AH-IV-Hb a top speed of 42 kilometres per hour (26 mph) and a range of 200 kilometres (120 mi). It weighed 3.93 tonnes (3.87 long tons; 4.33 short tons) and had a length of 3.2 metres (10 ft), a width of 1.82 metres (6.0 ft) and was 1.73 metres (5.7 ft) high. It had a ground pressure of only 0.48 kg/cm^{2}, could ford a stream up to 1 metre (3.3 ft) in depth, but could only overcome an obstacle 0.5 metres (1.6 ft) high. It used the ZB vz. 26 and vz. 37 machine guns, for which it carried 2,800 rounds.

== Operational history ==
=== Iran ===
The AH-IVs were split between the 1st and 2nd Infantry Divisions in service. Nothing more is known of their service. Withdrawn in 1948-1949.

=== Romania ===
The R-1s were assigned to the cavalry brigades, two platoons of two or three tankettes apiece. All eighteen belonging to the Cavalry Corps were grouped into the ad hoc "Korne Mechanized Detachment" during the opening stages of Operation Barbarossa, but all were out of commission by 1 October. Twenty-nine of the original thirty-five were allocated to the six cavalry divisions (redesignated from brigades on 25 March 1942) that successfully participated in the German 1942 summer offensive, codenamed Case Blue. The four R-1s belonging to the 1st Cavalry Division's 1st Mechanized Squadron had to be set on fire as no fuel was available for them when the division was encircled outside of Stalingrad in November 1942 as part of the Soviet Operation Uranus counter-offensive. The 5th and 8th Cavalry Divisions had lost at least five R-1s during the same time trying to solidify the crumbling Axis defenses after the Soviet breakthroughs. Both divisions supported the Germans as they attempted to relieve the Stalingrad Pocket in Operation Winter Storm, but were shattered when the Soviets counter-attacked the unsuccessful relief effort in late December 1942. Two other cavalry divisions remained in the Kuban bridgehead after the German withdrawal from the Caucasus, but their two remaining serviceable R-1s were withdrawn back to Romania during the spring of 1943 as obsolete. On 30 August 1943 only thirteen R-1s were available, all assigned to the Cavalry Training Center, although this increased by one on inventories dated 25 March and 19 July 1944. Nothing is known of any action involving R-1s during 1944, but eleven reinforced the 2nd Armored Regiment in Czechoslovakia when it reached the front on 26 March 1945. By 24 April the regiment only had one R-1 available, but none were reported as available after that date.

=== Sweden ===
The Strv m/37s initially served with the 1st Armored Battalion until the armored brigades began to be formed in 1943–44. Thereafter they served with the infantry regiments I 2, I 9, I 10 and P 1G Armored Company on Gotland. The tankettes remained in service on Gotland up to 1953.

=== Ethiopia ===
All twenty arrived in Djibouti on 9 May 1950 after which they were taken by rail to Addis Ababa. They were used until the 1980s when they participated in the fighting against Somalia.

== Users ==
- Ethiopia
- Iran
- Romania
- Sweden

== See also ==
- R-1 tank, article covering the Romanian variant in detail
- Stridsvagn m/37 tank, article covering the Swedish variant in detail
