= R-1 tank =

Romanian World War II light tank

R-1
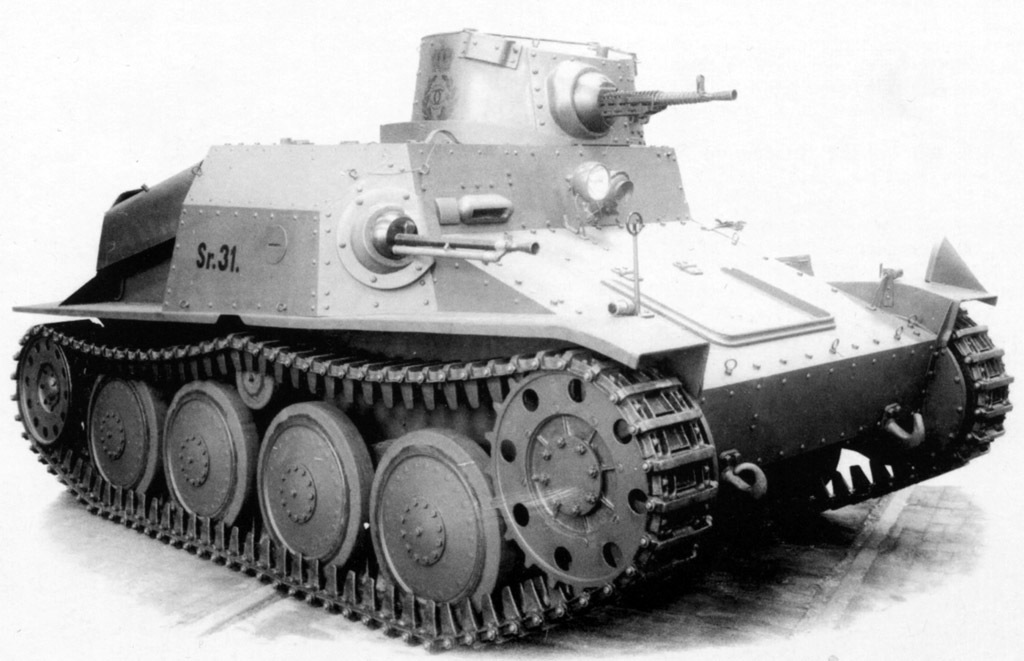
- Vehicle No. 31 ready for delivery to Romania with Carol II's badge on the turret
- Type: Light tank or tankette
- Place of origin: Czechoslovakia/Romania

Service history
- In service: 1941–45
- Used by: Romania; Soviet Union (captured)
- Wars: World War II

Production history
- Designer: ČKD
- Designed: 1936–37
- Manufacturer: ČKD, Malaxa
- Produced: 1936–39
- No. built: 36 (Note: Additionally, two prototypes were built, but kept in Czechoslovakia. 382 further serial vehicles were planned to be produced in Romania.)
- Variants: See Variants

Specifications
- Mass: 3.9 t (8,600 lb) (Note: Other sources state 4.2 t (9,300 lb))
- Length: 3.20 m (10 ft 6 in)
- Width: 1.73 m (5 ft 8 in) (Note: Other sources state 1.79 m (5.9 ft) or 1.815 m (5.95 ft))
- Height: 1.67 m (5 ft 6 in) (Note: Most common figure. Another source states 1.685 m (5 ft 6.3 in))
- Crew: 2
- Armor: 5–12 mm (0.20–0.47 in) (Note: Other sources give 6 mm as the thinnest armor thickness)
- Main armament: 7.92 mm (0.312 in) ZB vz. 35 heavy machine gun
- Secondary armament: 7.92 mm (0.312 in) ZB vz. 26/30 light machine gun
- Engine: Praga RHP, 6-cylinder, water-cooled 55 hp (41 kW)–60 hp (45 kW)
- Power/weight: 13.1–15.4 hp/tonne
- Suspension: Leaf spring
- Ground clearance: 0.32 m (13 in)
- Fuel capacity: 85 L (22 US gal)
- Operational range: 170 km (110 mi) (Note: Other sources state 250 km (160 mi))
- Maximum speed: 45 km/h (28 mph) on road (Note: One source gives 48 km/h (30 mph)); 20 km/h (12 mph) off-road

The R-1 was a Romanian-used tank that saw action during World War II within the mechanized Romanian cavalry. It was a modified version of the AH-IV, a Czechoslovak-designed export vehicle, which was used exclusively by Romanian forces during the war. A number of 36 were used, 35 of which were built in Czechoslovakia, while one modified example was built in Romania under license. The R-1 is classified as either a light tank or tankette.

In 1935, Romania sought to modernize its armored forces by acquiring tanks of different types. Multiple countries were contacted for this goal, among them being Romania's Little Entente allies of France and Czechoslovakia, as well as Poland (also an ally). The R-1 ended up being one of the vehicles acquired from Czechoslovakia. The vehicles were delivered to Romania in 1938 and were assigned to cavalry brigades. Romania had planned to locally produce 382 vehicles itself at the Malaxa Works, but for a number of reasons, this had never happened, with only one example (called R-1-a, being different from the original R-1) produced there.

When introduced in the 1930s, the R-1 was superior to other similar-class vehicles of its time, such as the German Panzer I. However, it became obsolete by the start of World War II. Romania had joined the war as an Axis power at the beginning of Operation Barbarossa. Like many other Axis light tanks, the R-1 proved to have a poor performance because of its weak armor and armament, as well as the lack of a radio, which had limited its effectiveness for the reconnaissance role. Soviet tanks, especially the new T-34 and KV-1, were invulnerable to the R-1's machine guns, while the R-1, on the other hand, was an easy prey for their 76 mm guns, being destructible even by Soviet 14.5 mm anti-tank rifles. Opinions on the vehicle's performance vary, as, despite these drawbacks, some historians actually describe the R-1's performance as successful.

By early 1943, the vehicles were withdrawn from the frontline as obsolete. A proposal existed to turn them into tank destroyers by mounting 45 mm 20-K guns on them (see TACAM R-1), which was to make them more effective against enemy armor. However, even that proposal was regarded as being obsolete and was therefore cancelled. After King Michael's Coup on 23 August 1944, which had overthrown the pro-Axis Ion Antonescu and had put Romania on the Allied side, the R-1 saw service once again at the Soviets' will.

Despite some R-1s having survived the war, none are known to still exist. However, a 1:1 scale working replica has been built in the Czech Republic, being used at commemorative events.

== Designation ==
=== Name ===
The vehicle's name in the Romanian army was R-1, less commonly spelled "R 1", also given as "R1" or "R.1" in some documents. The Czechoslovak factory designation, however, was AH-IV-R ("AH-IV version for Romania"). The one vehicle that was built in Romania under license was designated R-1-a. Sometimes, the vehicle is referred to in Romanian as Carul de recunoaștere R-1 (Note: Car (definite article form carul) is a Romanian term of Latin origin, in this context an outdated term for "tank" based on French char and Italian carro, nowadays replaced by tanc) ("Reconnaissance tank R-1").

=== Classification ===
Different sources class the vehicle as either a light tank or tankette. There are also sources directly stating that the R-1 could be classed as either, having features of both types. Contemporary documents show that the Romanians considered the vehicle to be a tank. German historian Walter Spielberger calls it a light tank, while Peter Chamberlain and Chris Ellis simply refer to it as a "small tank".

== Background ==
Since 1919, the Renault FT had been the only tank of the Romanian armored forces. While glorious in its days during World War I, it became obsolete by the 1930s, which had led to Romania searching for ways to improve its tank force. A proposal existed in 1926 to build Vickers tanks under license at the Reșița Works, followed by a similar proposal in 1934. However, none of the proposals were materialized, the first having been rejected by the army because of the proposed tank being considered inadequate, while the second one was just an idea that isn't known to have been further discussed.

In July 1935, the Romanians had decided that they needed two types of tanks for their army: a light one for reconnaissance purposes (car de recunoaștere) and a medium one for infantry support (car de însoțire). Later that same year, they had decided to hold a contest, inviting different companies from Czechoslovakia, France, Italy, Poland, the United Kingdom and the United States, to see what tanks each country has to offer. It was then that they were first shown a description of the AH-IV by the ČKD company, which had first asked the Czechoslovak Ministry of Defense for approval to deliver tanks to Romania in 1933. Later, a third heavier tank category was added to the Romanians' acquisition plans, referred to as car de ansamblu ("main tank" or "universal tank").

The R-1 had ended up being acquired for the reconnaissance role, while the R-2 and R35 were purchased for infantry support. The "universal tank" role was to be destined to the ST vz. 39 and later the R-3, neither of which were acquired for different reasons.

== Development ==
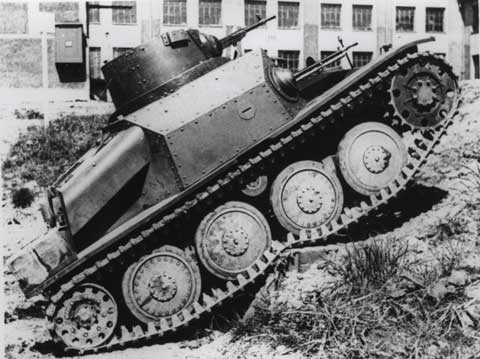
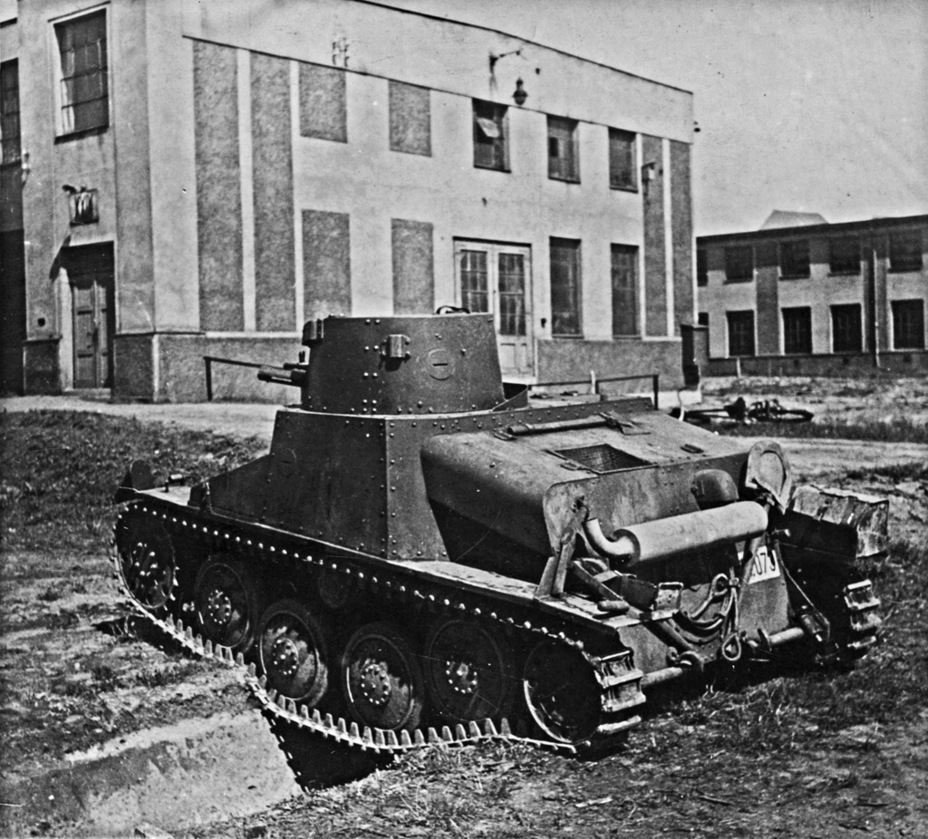
The R-1's prototype during trials at the ČKD yard (1936)

Czechoslovakia had started developing the AH-IV in early 1935. Iran was the first country to buy such vehicles, with its version being designated AH-IV-P ("P" for "Persia"). Czechoslovakia's ally of Romania was the next customer, having ordered 35 tanks in 1936. The army had actually ordered a total of 417 R-1s; the remaining 382 were to be produced in Romania under license at the Malaxa Works. Another report, however, suggested that a smaller number of vehicles was needed, mentioning among others the need of "368 R-1s and R-2s".

A Romanian commission was sent to the Renault and Vickers factories in November 1935 to inspect armored fighting vehicles, but eventually decided to purchase Czechoslovak tanks, visiting Czechoslovakia that same month. On 2 April 1936, a contract was signed with ČKD for the delivery of 36 AH-IVs and 100 P-II-a tanks (a vehicle similar to the LT vz. 35, which was to become the R-2 infantry support tank). However, the contract was changed in May, when the Romanians had decided to buy S-II-a tanks (Škoda's LT vz. 35) as the R-2 instead, since said vehicle had already been introduced in the allied Czechoslovak army, leading to the Romanians' wish to use the same tank as their allies so their armies develop a similarity, being advantageous in case of a war. This led to a new contract being signed with ČKD on 14 August 1936, only including 35 AH-IVs, designated as R-1 by the Romanians.

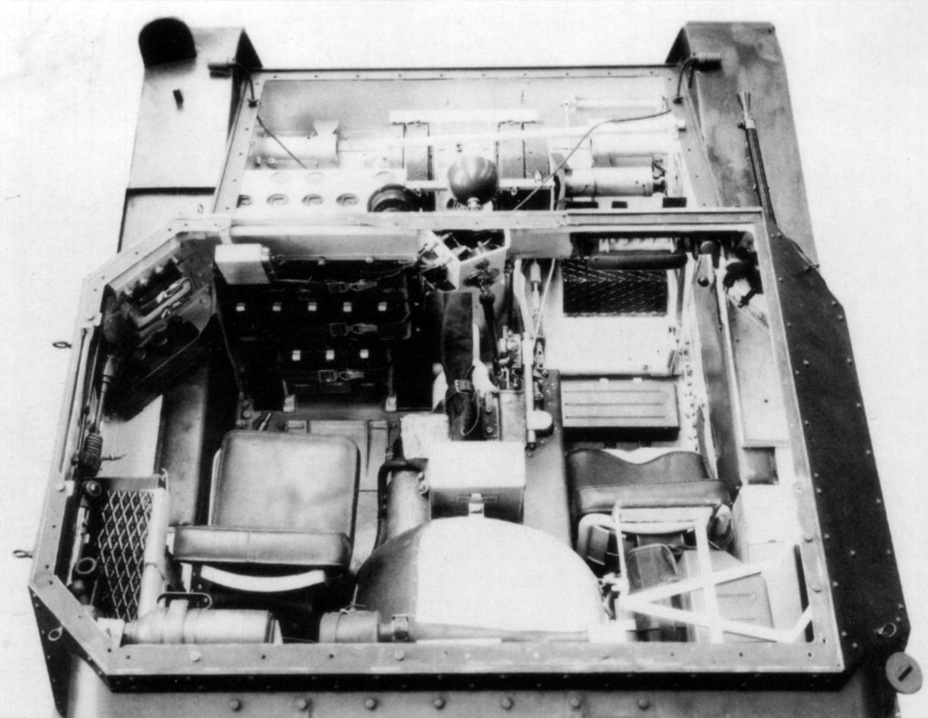
An R-1 under construction with the superstructure removed to allow a view of the interior

The vehicles were supposed to be delivered to Romania in 1937, but their delivery had to be postponed out of multiple reasons. First of all, in October 1936, the Romanian Ministry of Defense had requested that a number of modifications get made to the vehicle. Thus, despite the R-1 being built on the basis of the already tested and produced Iranian AH-IV-P, due to the new Romanian requirements, the prototype's driving and technical tests could only begin by the end on the year. In the meantime, ČKD had begun production of the entire series; the modifications the company was asked for had to take place during the series' construction.

The situation was critical on 27 September 1937, when the Romanians had refused to take over the first ten production vehicles because they didn't meet the conditions that were agreed on. This had slowed down the whole process even further. According to a Romanian report from February 1938, the cause behind this was the overheating of the vehicles' radiators. The same report stated that "the R-1 and R-2 tanks, whose delivery was supposed to finish in the course of 1937, don't have their prototypes approved [for delivery] to this day".

The Romanian side had requested to borrow multiple R-1s for training exercises that were to take place in October 1937 on Romanian territory. Therefore, ČKD had sent ten vehicles by the end of September. The borrowed vehicles performed well and did not show any serious operational or technical shortcomings; the Romanians were satisfied with the trials' results. Part of this was due to the fact that ČKD had sent very experienced drivers to perform the trials. After testing, the vehicles were returned to Czechoslovakia on 22 October. Driving and technical trials continued in Czechoslovakia the next month, under supervision of a Romanian commission.

By late 1937, all 35 serial production vehicles had been completed. After tests, they were sent to Romania in the spring of 1938 after an acceptance protocol was signed in the Transylvanian city of Sibiu. The prototype, however, was kept at the ČKD works. The official takeover by the Romanian side was only signed on 19 August, since the vehicles had to perform further tests to demonstrate their ability during summer conditions. The R-1s were then assigned to the Cavalry Training Center in Sibiu.

=== Production in Romania ===
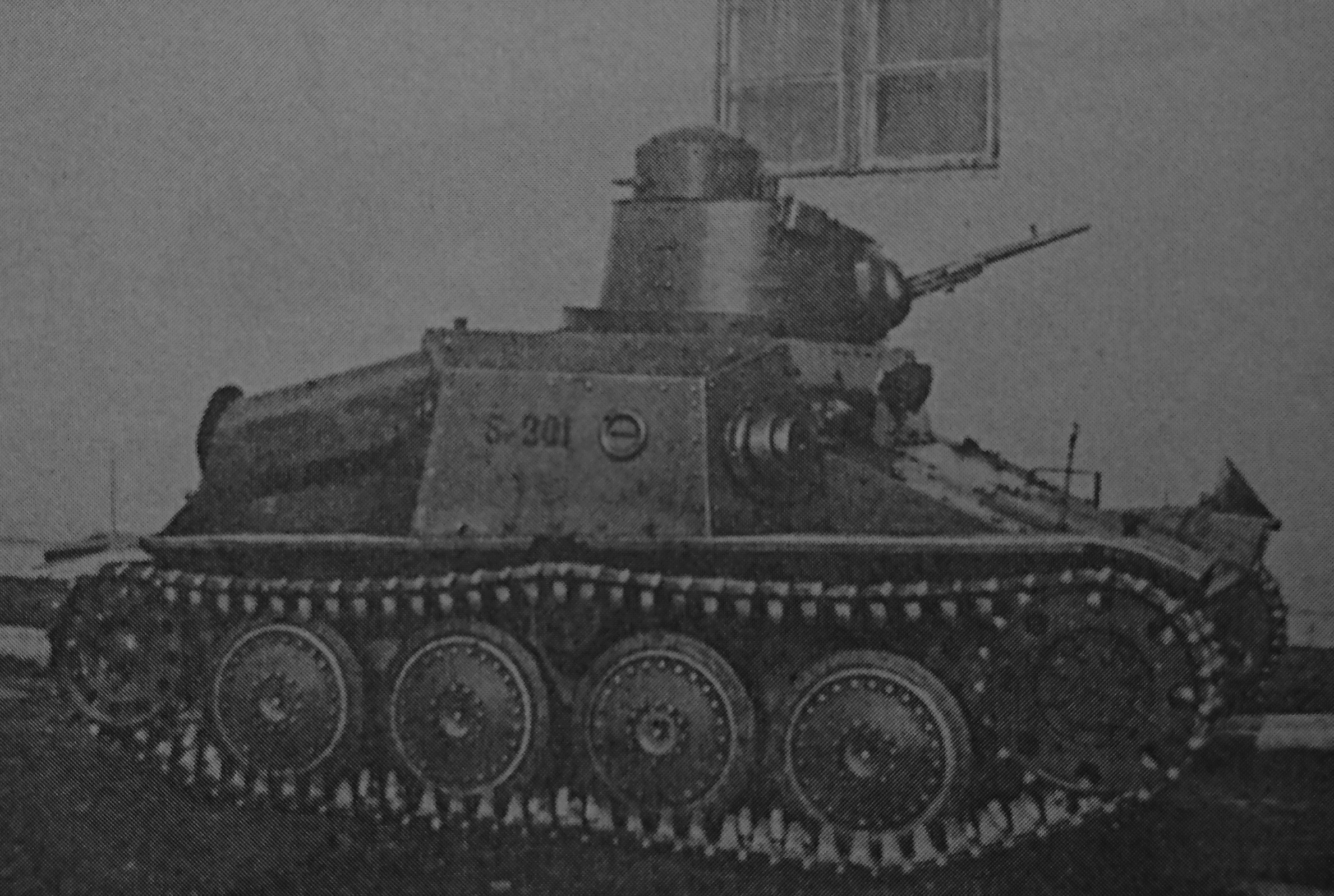
Vehicle No. 301 with a cupola on the turret, stated by some sources to be the Romanian-produced R-1-a

In May 1938, a Romanian delegation led by General Vasile Negrei was again sent to Czechoslovakia to negotiate the buying of a license for producing the R-1. The license was acquired for the production of 382 vehicles, based on earlier talks from 1936. The agreement was signed in September 1938, but was at first refused by ČKD because of Nicolae Malaxa (owner of the Malaxa Works) making some changes to it. After long negotiations, a new agreement was signed on 22 February 1939, but was only approved by the Romanian Ministry of Defense 15 May, after the German occupation of Czech territory. The cost of the license was of 1,962,540 Protectorate korunas. The price included a complete prototype which was to be sent to Romania along with the R-1's blueprints. However, the prototype was not sent because of the Malaxa Works going bankrupt in the meantime.

One vehicle is known to have been produced in Romania, designated R-1-a. However, the above-mentioned planned serial production never took place. According to Romanian historian Cornel Scafeș, this was because the Romanian Ministry of Defense had considered the vehicle obsolete by 1939. British author Mark Axworthy describes the production's cancellation as unfortunate for the Romanians, since the development of the R-1's hull could potentially have led to a faster production of the much more potent Mareșal tank destroyer.

According to Charles Kliment and Vladimír Francev, the vehicle that was built in Romania was the one with the number 301, which photographs show to be a modified R-1 version, having a commander's cupola on the turret and a slightly elevated right side of the hull. However, another source (Ivo Pejčoch and Oldřich Pejs) states that vehicle 301 was actually a Czechoslovak-produced one, part of the 35 serial production vehicles, which was modified as a commander's vehicle to include the aforementioned features. It was sent to Romania without any armament. Photographs show that its turret was later armed. Mark Axworthy specifically mentions that it is uncertain whether vehicle 301 was the Romanian-produced one or not.

== Characteristics ==
=== Dimensions and weight ===
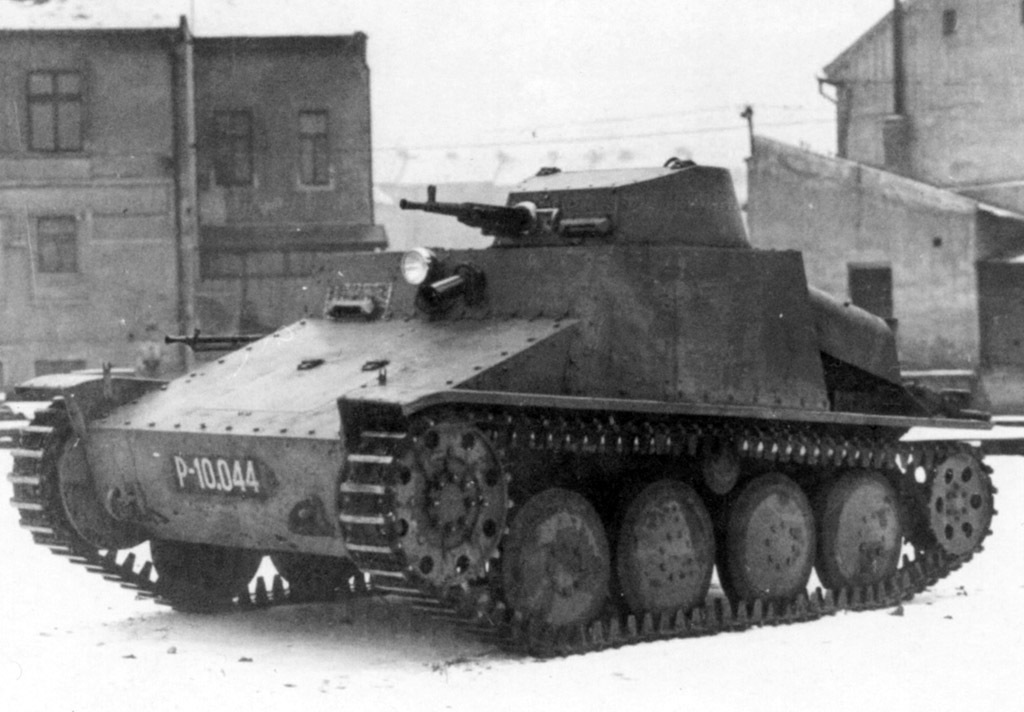
The original AH-IV prototype. It was different from the R-1, having a flatter turret.

The Romanian R-1 was different from both the original AH-IV prototype and the Persian AH-IV-P, being structurally based on the latter. The original AH-IV prototype had a much flatter turret. Therefore, its profile was lower, at 1.38 m, while its length was of 3 m and its width of 1.75 m.

Both the R-1 and AH-IV-P had a length of 3.20 m, according to multiple sources. However, sources differ when it comes to other characteristics. According to one work, both the Romanian and Persian vehicles had the height of 1.67 m (5 ft 6 in). Another source gives the same height for the AH-IV-P, while stating the R-1 was slightly taller at 1.685 m (5 ft 6.3 in). However, there is also one source that states the R-1 had 1.67 m, while the AH-IV-P was taller at 1.69 m. All sources agree on the fact that the Persian vehicle's width was of 1.79 m. One source states the same width for the R-1 while others give it as either 1.73 m or 1.815 m.

One source gives the AH-IV-P's weight as 3.5 t, others stating it was 3.9 t. The R-1's weight is stated to have been of 3.9 t by some works and 4.2 t by others.

=== Armor and armament ===
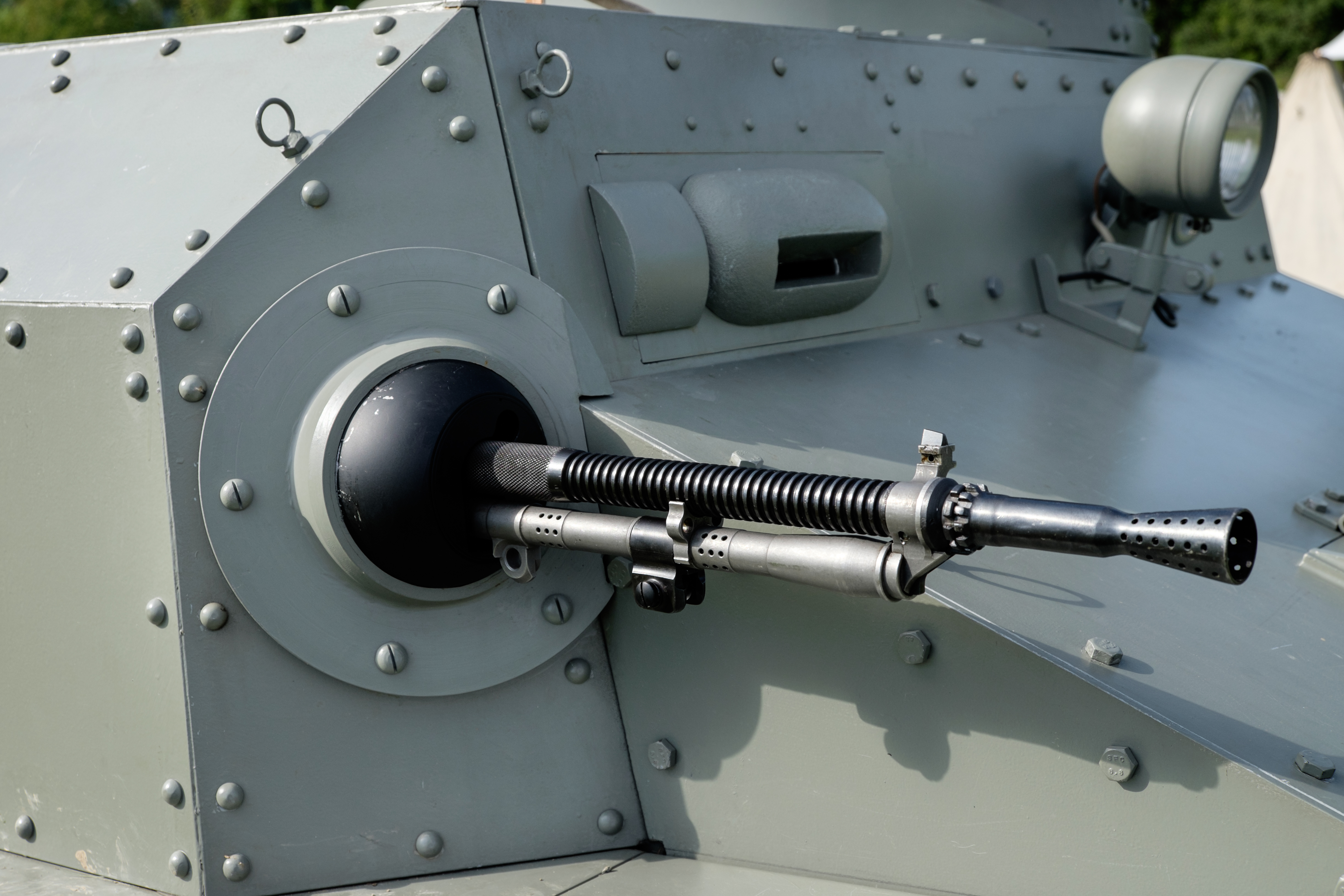
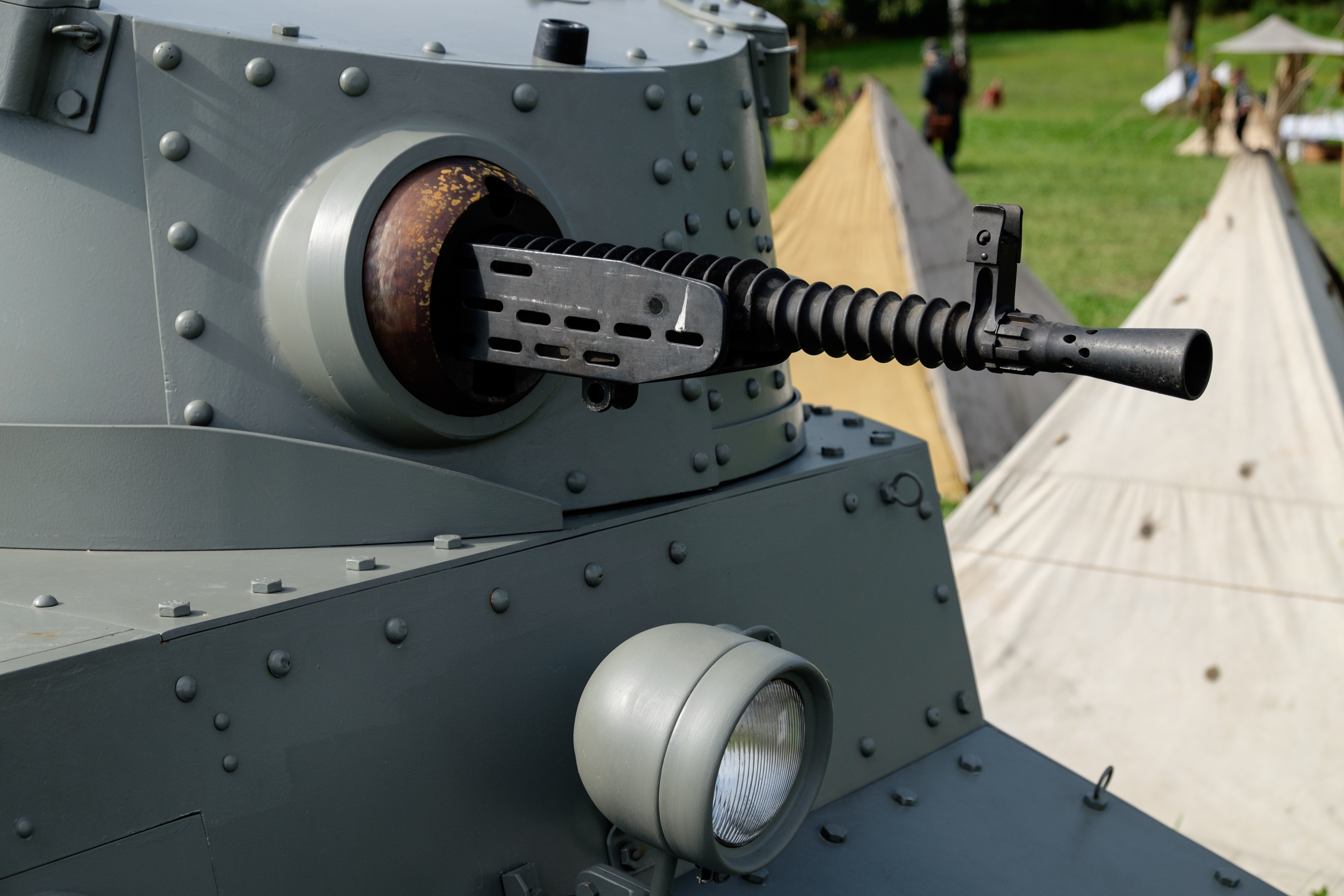
Closer look at the R-1's guns: the ZB vz. 26/30 mounted in the hull (left) and the turret-mounted ZB vz. 35. The vehicle in the pictures is a replica.

The R-1 was also different from both the Persian AH-IV-P and the original Czechoslovak AH-IV prototype in terms of armor. The latter had an armor thickness ranging from 5 to 10 mm. The AH-IV-P is stated by some sources to have had 6 to 15 mm thick armor, while all agree on the fact that the R-1's one was of 12 mm at its thickest. This indicates that one of the changes demanded by the Romanians when ordering the vehicle was to have its armor thickness decreased. There are also sources, however, stating that the Persian AH-IV-P also had 12 mm as its thickest armor; Charles Kliment and Vladimír Francev even state that their armor layout was identical, reaching from 6 to 12 mm. According to Ivo Pejčoch and Oldřich Pejs, though, even if the maximum armor was of 12 mm for both vehicles, they still had a different overall layout, since the Romanian vehicle had 5 mm as its thinnest value. The armor was only effective against small arms; Soviet anti-tank rifles could penetrate it.

The vehicle's armament consisted of two machine guns. The main gun—a 7.92 mm ZB vz. 35 heavy machine gun—was mounted in the turret. The secondary armament, a light machine gun, was mounted in the right side of the hull. According to one source, it was a 7.92 mm ZB vz. 26, other works mentioning a ZB vz. 30, which was based on the former. These guns were not effective against enemy armor. Together, they had 3700 rounds of ammunition.

A Romanian report from March 1938 stated that the soon-to-be-acquired reconnaissance vehicle was actually supposed to have a 37 mm gun as its main armament and have armor strong enough to resist against anti-tank rifles of calibers smaller than 15 mm—the R-1 possessed none of these features.

=== Others ===
The Romanian roundel was one of the emblems used to mark the vehicles

Despite Romanian armored fighting vehicles from the World War II-era mostly using King Michael's cross as their emblem—a symbol consisting of four Ms merged to form a cross, similar to the German iron cross—the R-1 used the Romanian roundel. Some are known to have had it painted on the left side of the hull, while others had it painted on its right side as well as the middle frontal plate. The only other vehicle known to have used the roundel was a captured Soviet T-26. From 1937 to 1940—the year of King Carol II's abdication—R-1s and R-2s had also used Carol II's badge, showing two Cs merged within a circle, with the Steel Crown of Romania above them (see article's upper-most picture). Since the R-1 was a vehicle of the mechanized cavalry, it had also used an extra badge showing Saint George—the patron saint of cavalry—slaying the Dragon. This badge was painted on the turret's left side.

The R-1 was faster than both the original AH-IV and the Persian AH-IV-P. The former had a maximum on-road speed of 40 km/h, having a 46 hp engine, while for the latter it was of 44 km/h with a 54 hp engine. The R-1 reached 45 km/h at its most, having a 60 hp engine. German historian Walter Spielberger, however, states the same top speed of 45 km/h for the AH-IV-P, as do Kliment and Francev, the latter source stating that both it and the R-1 had 55 hp engines. Spielberger gives 48 km/h for the R-1. A Praga-Wilson transmission was used for the vehicle, whose off-road speed was of 20 km/h. The licensed R-1-a was planned to be equipped with an improved Praga RHR engine, reaching 68 hp.

The vehicle, whose crew consisted of two men, had its viewing ports and gun mount different compared to those of the AH-IV-P. It had four rubber-rimmed road wheels on each side, with diameters of 500 mm. It was able to break through 300 mm thick brick walls and knock down trees with diameters of 250 mm.

The R-1 had no radio, which had limited its effectiveness in the role that it was actually acquired for: reconnaissance. There was a plan to equip the vehicles with radio stations in May 1938, but it is not known to have been implemented.

== Operational history ==
=== July–October 1941: Bessarabia and Odessa ===
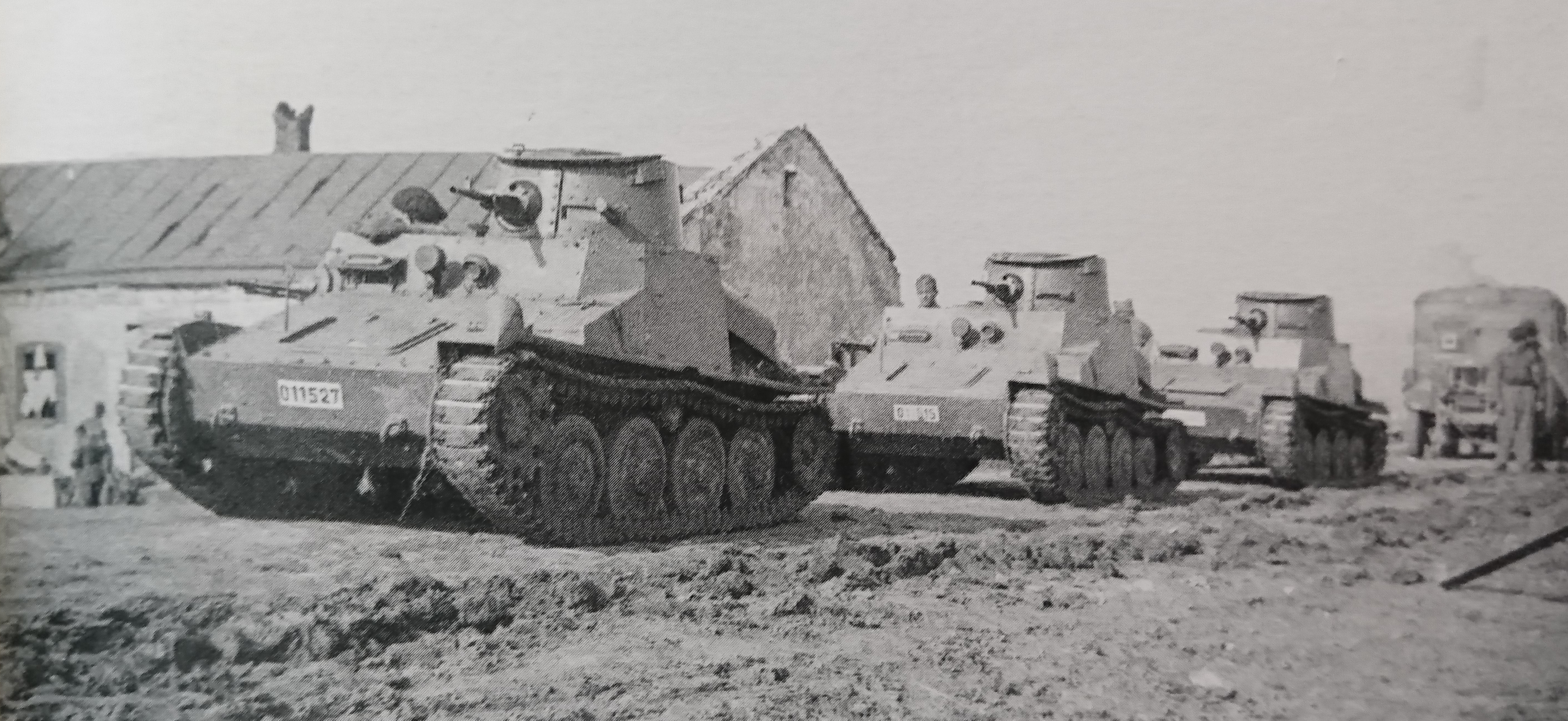
Squadron of R-1 tanks within a cavalry brigade (Ukraine, 1941)

The R-1 saw action during World War II within the Romanian cavalry, after Romania had joined the invasion of the Soviet Union as an Axis member in 1941, to get back Bessarabia, Northern Bukovina and the Hertsa region, all occupied by the Soviets following the Molotov–Ribbentrop Pact.

30 R-1s are known to have been used in 1941, most notably within the 5th, 6th and 8th Cavalry Brigades, with smaller numbers in the 1st, 7th and 9th Cavalry Brigades. The latter three were almost completely horsed, but each did have a mechanized reconnaissance squadron including two platoons of light tanks, each of two R-1s. These brigades were unable to conduct significant mechanized operations, and served with the 4th Army at the Siege of Odessa. The other three brigades (5th, 6th and 8th) were more heavily armed and motorized, having had a significant offensive potential and conducted extensive mechanized operations during the 1941 and 1942 campaigns, within the 3rd Army. Each of these brigades, which had 285 motor vehicles in 1941, included a mechanized reconnaissance squadron which contained, among others, two platoons of three R-1s each.

Once the Stalin Line was broken through on 19 July 1941, the opportunity for mobile operations presented itself, and the Cavalry Corps formed the Korne Mechanized Detachment to exploit the opportunity. It was led by Colonel Radu Korne, who particularly distinguished himself and even received favorable comment from Hitler. His detachment included 18 R-1 tanks. Korne is known to have successfully counterattacked Soviet infantry divisions in September and October 1941, which had strong tank, artillery and air support. However, on 1 October, all 18 of the Cavalry Corps' R-1s were out of commission.

=== October 1941–July 1942: Crimea and Eastern Ukraine ===
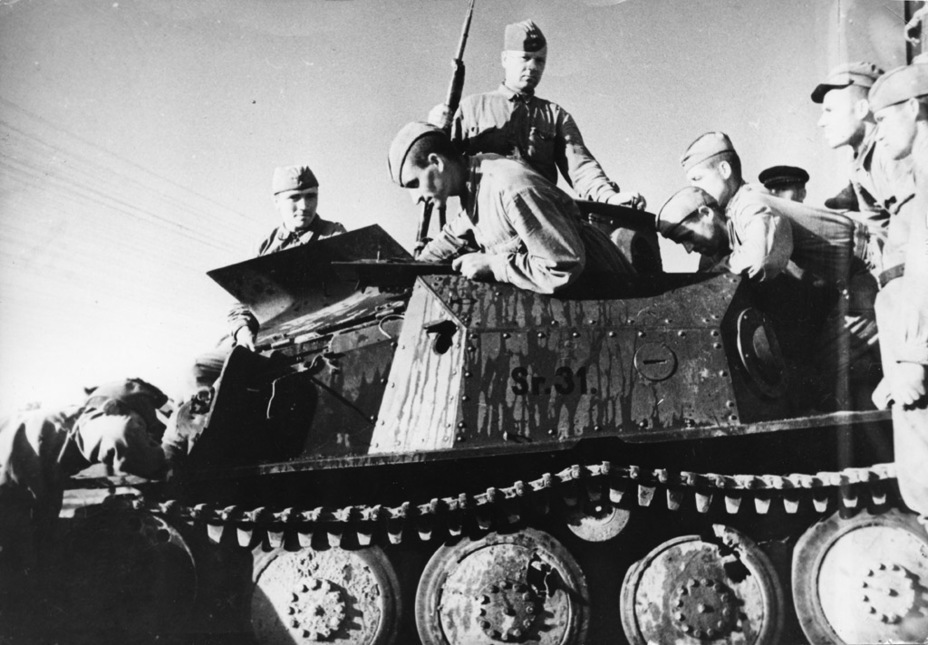
Soviet soldiers inspect a captured R-1 near Odessa (September 1941)

In October 1941, the 6th Motorized Roșiori and the 5th Mechanized Squadron of the 8th Cavalry Brigade were combined into the Korne Motorized Detachment and subordinated to the Ziegler Motorized Brigade. It was the only Axis mechanized unit available in Crimea.

Soviet major Fedor Volonchuk describes in his memoirs an episode from the Crimean campaign, which had happened in November. He recalls how three enemy tanks (which were R-1s of Korne's Detachment) kept on driving up on a hill, making Soviet observers able to see them, and then drove down behind the hill, in the same direction they had come from, making themselves unseen. They kept on repeating this action, trying to trick Soviet observers into believing that big amounts of tanks were gathering up behind that hill. Major Volonchuk had spotted the R-1s from an angle which allowed him to see them throughout the whole action, without understanding, at first, why they were performing these maneuvers. After finishing his reconnaissance mission, he had gone back to the other Soviet observers, who had told him that "at least 30" enemy tanks were concentrated behind that hill, proving that the Romanians had at first succeeded in their attempt to trick the Soviets. However, Volonchuk had only reported the three tanks he saw, after which he understood why the Romanians were performing those maneuvers. A captured Romanian soldier had later confirmed there were only three tanks at the hill.

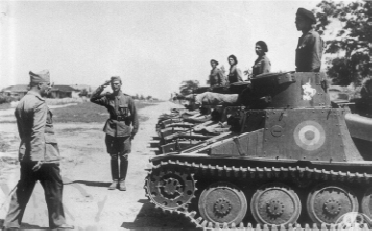
General Pantazi inspecting a group of R-1s. The turret emblem shows Saint George slaying the Dragon, indicating that the vehicles belonged to the cavalry (1942).

In early April 1942, the Korne Detachment had been further expanded by the addition of the 11th Motorized Roșiori. The 5th and 6th Cavalry Corps are known to have also fought in eastern Ukraine, on the northern shore of the Sea of Azov.

Multiple cavalry brigades were used for security duties in the Transnistria Governorate and the area between it and the Dnieper river, serving under General Petre Dumitrescu's 3rd Army.

=== August 1942–Spring 1943: Stalingrad and withdrawal ===
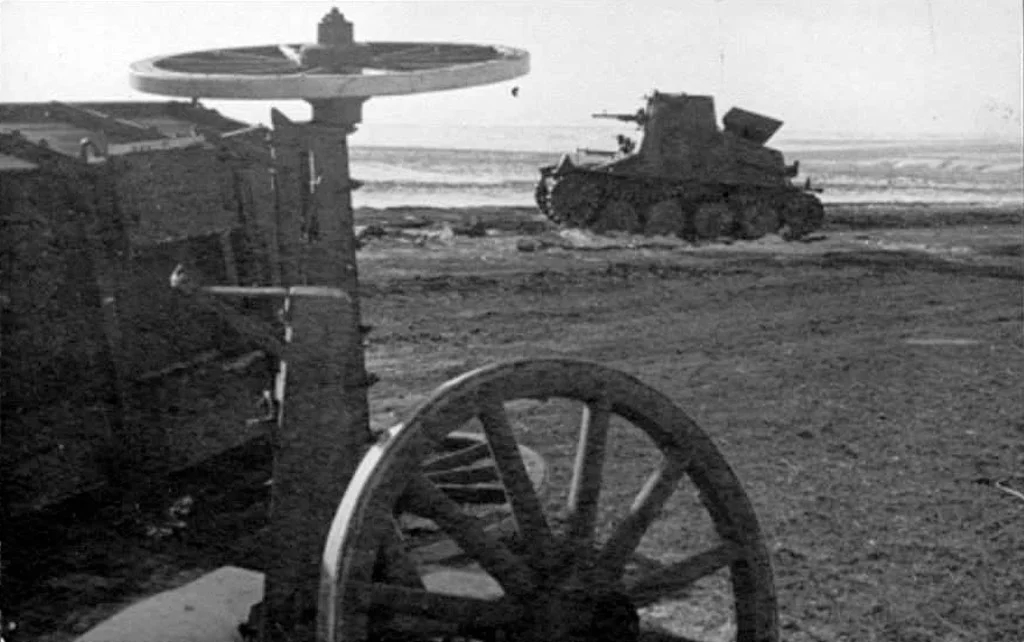
R-1 at Stalingrad, where most of the vehicles were lost

Most of the R-1s disabled in 1941 were recoverable. For the summer campaign of 1942 the cavalry divisions had still fielded 29.

Cavalry divisions fought along the whole eastern shore of the Sea of Azov. The 5th Cavalry Division had occupied the ports of Yeysk and Primorsko-Akhtarsk on 9 and 11 August, respectively.

On 19 November, in the area of Pronin, the Romanian 7th Cavalry Division is known to have lost three of its six R-1s in a clash with the Soviet 8th Cavalry Corps. On that same day, the 5th Cavalry Division had lost all of its five R-1s. The next day, during a Soviet counteroffensive, the 1st Cavalry Division had to set on fire its four fuelless R-1s while retreating, to avoid intact capture by the enemy.

By 1 January 1943, 14 R-1s were lost by the four cavalry divisions that had fought at Stalingrad, while by spring, the 6th and 9th Cavalry Divisions had only two serviceable R-1s left in their mechanized squadrons. These were withdrawn to Romania shortly afterwards as obsolete.

After this point, the R-1 isn't known to have been further used as long as Romania was part of the Axis. A 1944 scheme of Romanian cavalry divisions showed no R-1s within them anymore.

On 22 November 1943, the General Staff of the Romanian Army had decided to rearm the 14 surviving R-1s with captured Soviet 45 mm 20-K anti-tank guns. This conversion was provisionally dubbed TACAM R-1, but was quickly recognized as being virtually useless, since these guns were ineffective against Soviet T-34 medium and KV-1 heavy tanks, and was therefore cancelled.

=== August 1944–Spring 1945: Use against the Axis ===
On 23 August 1944, Romania's Conducător, the pro-Axis Marshal Ion Antonescu was overthrown by King Michael's Coup, which had made the country defect from the Axis powers. Now fighting against the Axis, Romania was forced by the Soviets to reorganize its 2nd Armored Regiment. Many of its vehicles were captured by the Soviets, who gave the Romanians some Panzer IV medium tanks and StuG III G assault guns in exchange. The R-1, having been subordinate to the cavalry, appears to have escaped Soviet inspections.

Different military vehicle units which included R-1s are known to have been used in the defense of Romania after the coup, defending Bucharest and Ploiești. They were also used to get back Northern Transylvania, which had been annexed by Hungary following the Second Vienna Award in 1940. 11 R-1s were then sent to fight against the Axis in Hungary and Czechoslovakia.

A platoon of an unspecified number of R-1s is known to have survived the war, having come back to Romania from Czechoslovak territory in which it had fought. Charles Kliment and Hilary Doyle claim they were still in service with the Romanian Army until 1955.

Russian tank historian Yuri Pasholok describes it as "ironic" how the R-1 saw action in modern-day Czech territory towards the end of its career, since the vehicle had been designed in Czechoslovakia.

=== Performance ===
Opinions on the vehicle's performance vary, as some works state the vehicle had little value in the war, while others describe it as having been successful.

Mark Axworthy, a British author, says the R-1 had "little operational value", since it lacked significant armor or armament. He does say the vehicle had some potential in the reconnaissance role, but even that was limited by the lack of a radio. Romanian author Alexandru Ștefănescu goes as far as stating the vehicle was "disappointing", adding to Axworthy's reasons that the tank had "poor sights" and "was only useful for supplying ammunition on the battlefield", quoting General Petre Dumitrescu.

Despite these drawbacks, Charles Kliment and Vladimír Francev, two authors of Czech literature, describe the vehicle's performance as "very successful". Yuri Pasholok, a Russian author of books and online articles, also describes the vehicle's career as having been "rather successful", especially considering it was of an outdated class. He also describes its interior as "spacious and comfortable enough for a tankette".

When it comes to the time of its introduction, Axworthy describes the R-1 as a "modern yet simple vehicle". Kliment and Francev state the AH-IV was undoubtedly superior to the German Panzer I when introduced, but it was already obsolete by 1938.

== Variants ==
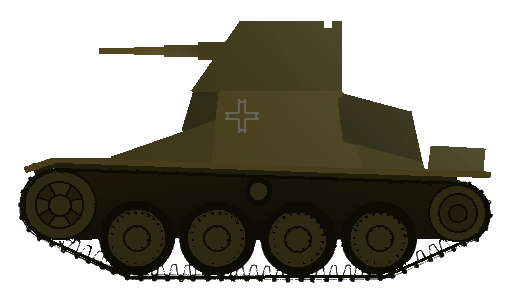
TACAM R-1 reconstruction based on its description. The turret is replaced by a casemate, as on other TACAMs.

- R-1 – main variant
- R-1-a – Romanian-produced variant; an improved engine was planned for the serial production which never took place
- Commanders' vehicle – the vehicle with a cupola, claimed by some sources to have actually been the Romanian-produced R-1-a (see Production in Romania section for details)
- TACAM R-1 – planned tank destroyer variant that was never built

== Operators ==
- Kingdom of Romania – main operator
- Soviet Union – captured vehicles

== Surviving vehicles ==
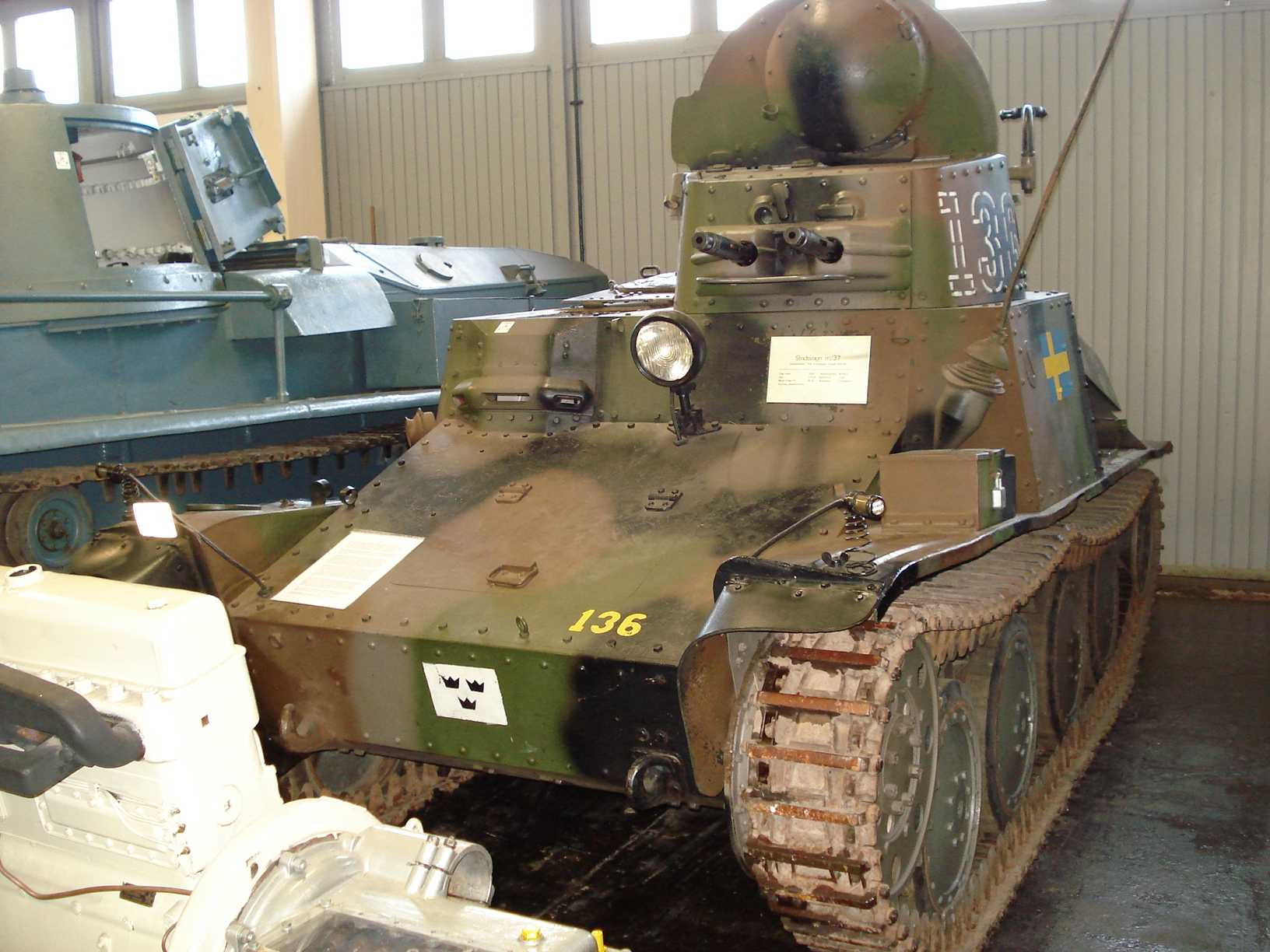
A surviving Strv m/37, Sweden's AH-IV version

The only original AH-IVs known to have survived to this day are multiple vehicles of the Swedish variant, Strv m/37, also known as AH-IV-Sv. No R-1s are known to still exist, despite some having survived the war. One is known to have survived in Czechoslovakia until the 1980s. That was the prototype planned to be sent to Romania along with the license (see Production in Romania section). It was kept at the ČKD works and modified in 1948 for a new Ethiopian order.

However, a 1:1 scale working R-1 replica exists. It was built from 2006 to 2013 in the Czech Republic by Luděk Fiala and Lubomír Smolinský, with assistance of the Lichkov Military Museum, and is currently being used at commemorative events. Below are photos of its front and rear sides; see External links for photos of its construction phase, as well as a video of it being driven.

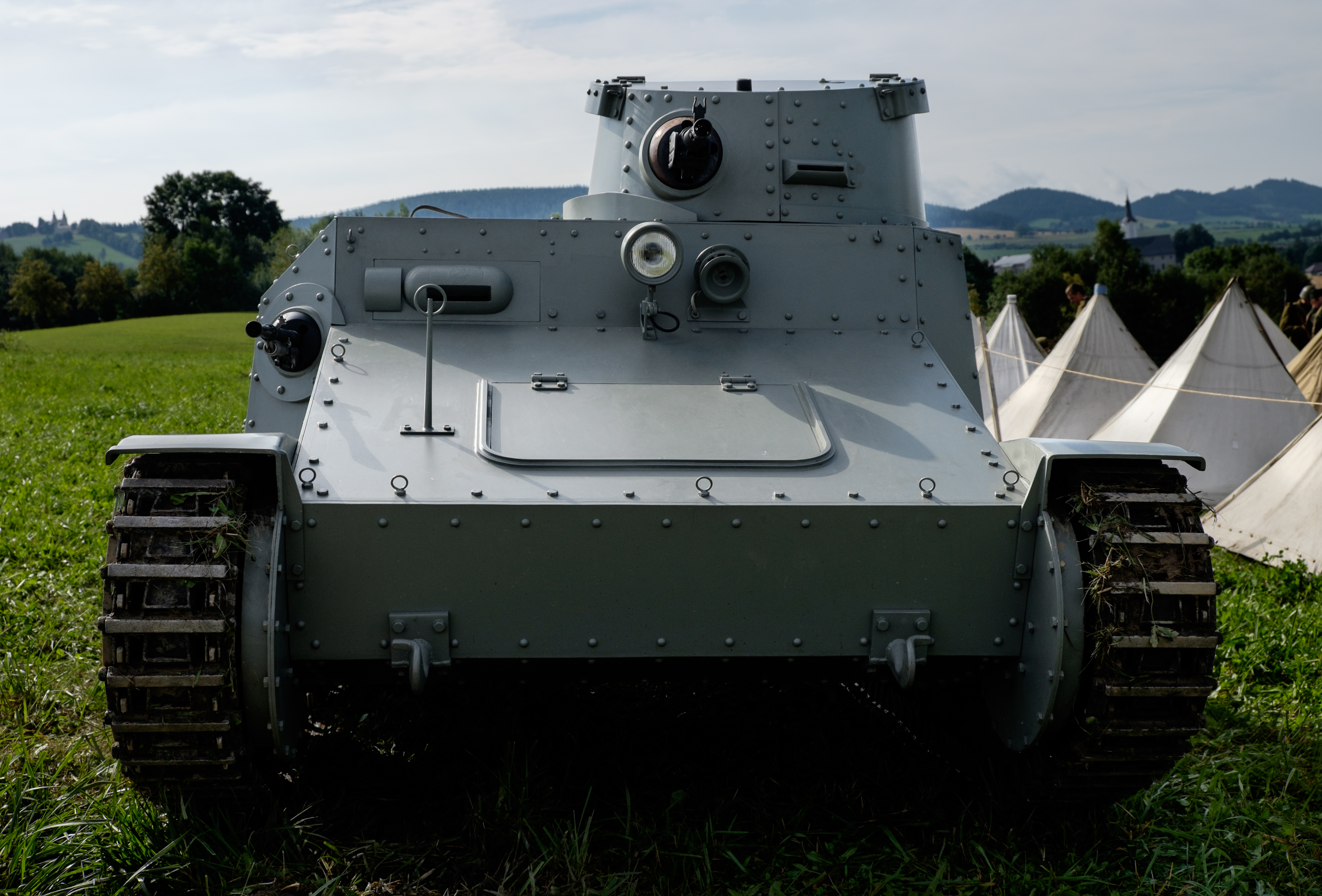

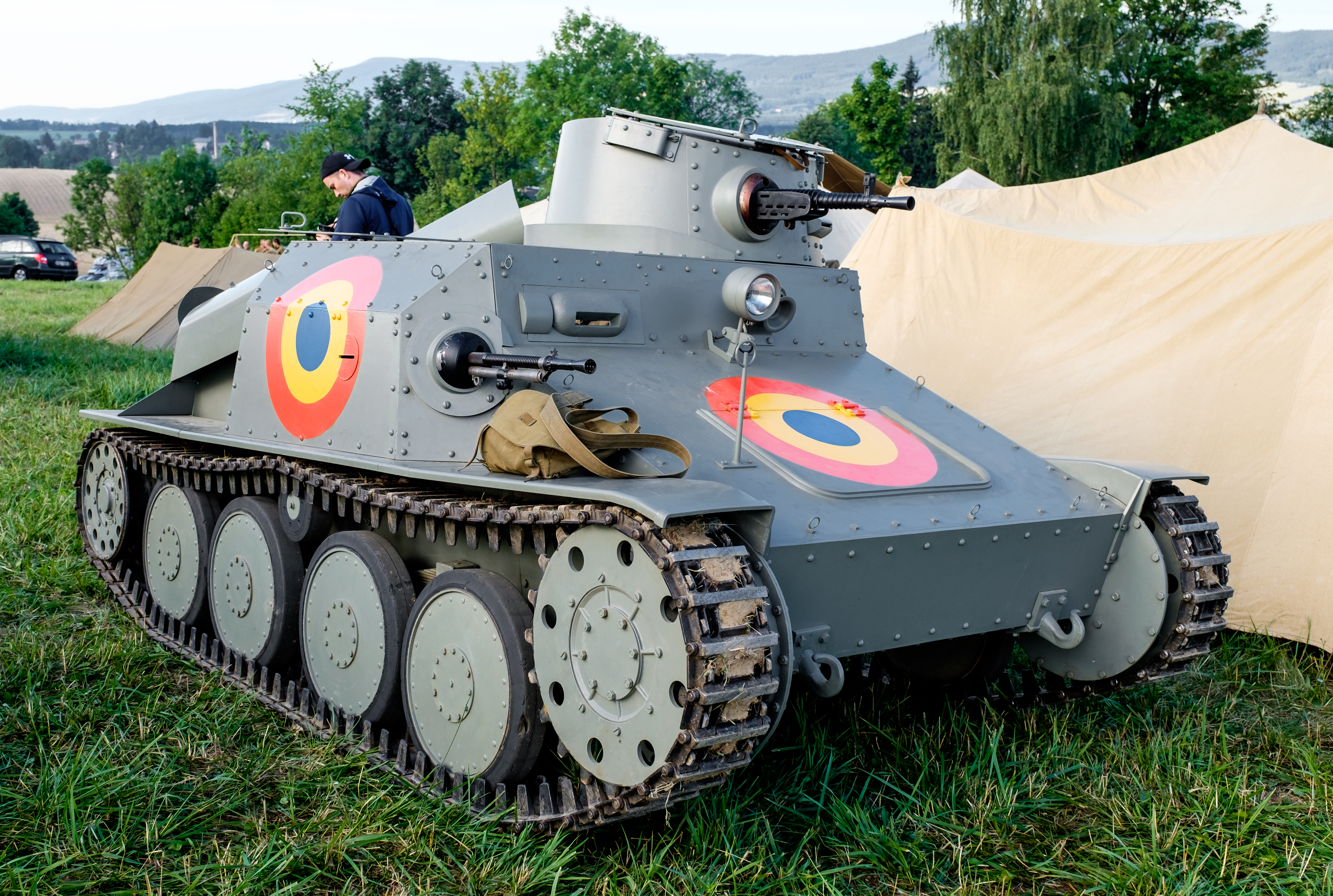

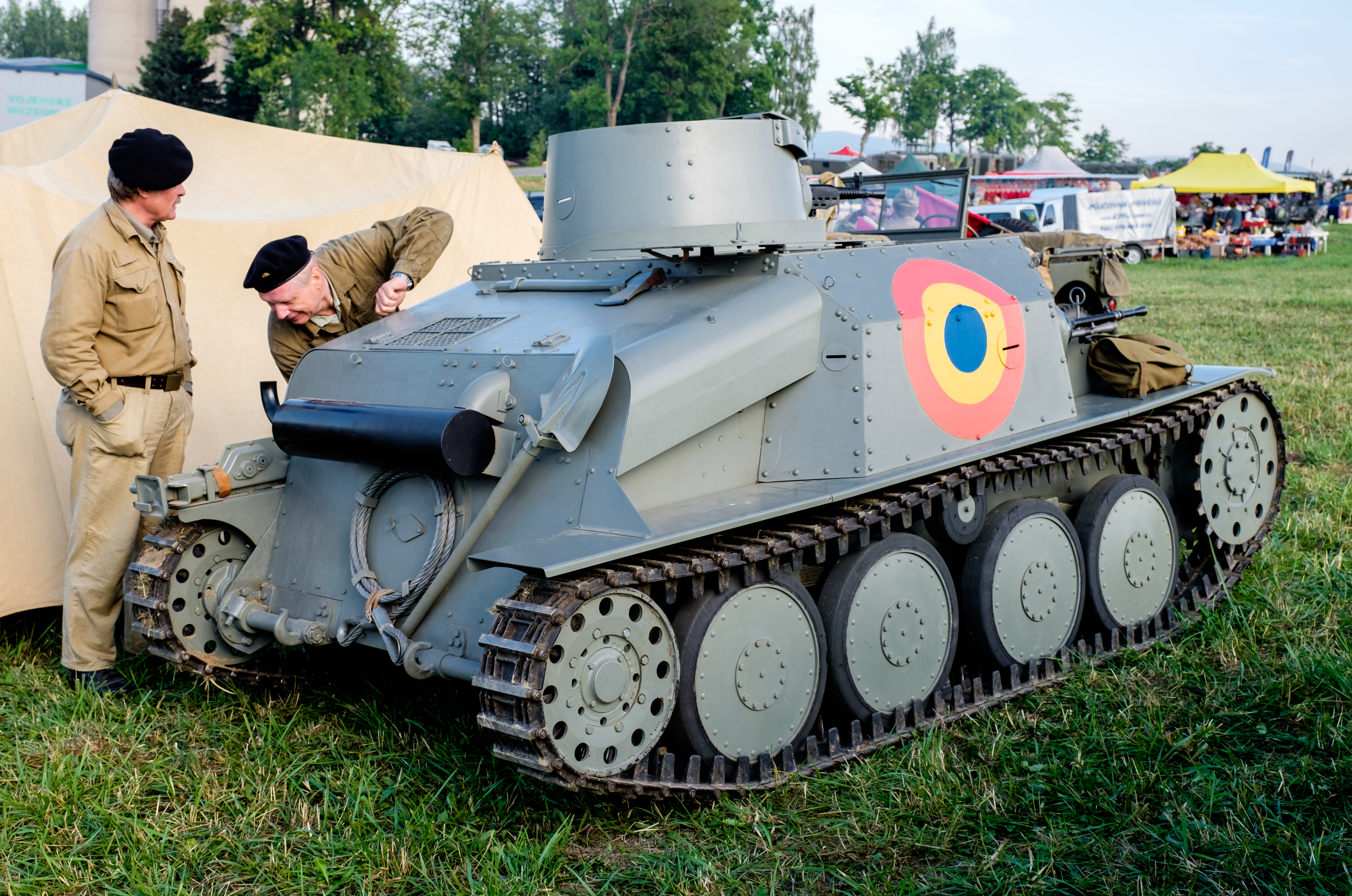

== See also ==
- Romanian armored fighting vehicle production during World War II
- R-2 tank
- R-3 tank

=== Comparable vehicles ===
- Germany: Panzer I
- Italy: L3/33 • L3/35
- Japan: Type 94
- Poland: TK-3 and TKS
- Soviet Union: T-27 • T-37A • T-38
- Sweden: Strv m/37
- United Kingdom: Light Tank Mk VI • Vickers 6-Ton A

== Sources ==
- Abbott, Peter; Thomas, Nigel (November 25, 1982). Germany's Eastern Allies 1941–45. Men-at-Arms 131. Oxford, UK: Osprey Publishing. ISBN 0850454751.
- Axworthy, Mark (1995). Third Axis, Fourth Ally: Romanian Armed Forces in the European War, 1941–1945. London: Arms and Armour. ISBN 9781854092670.
- Axworthy, Mark; Șerbănescu, Horia Vl. (1991). The Romanian Army of World War 2. Men-at-Arms 246. Oxford, UK: Osprey Publishing. ISBN 1-85532-169-6.
- Chamberlain, Peter; Ellis, Chris (2002) [1972 by Arms and Armour]. Tanks of the World 1915–1945. London: Cassell & Co. ISBN 0-30436141-0.
- Chiriță, Mihai; Moșneagu, Marian; Florea, Petrișor; Duță, Cornel (July 2009). "Preocupări ale factorilor militari de decizie pe linia înzestrării cu tancuri a armatei române în perioada 1919–1944" [Concerns of the Decisive Military Staff on the Topic of Tank Endowment in the Romanian Army from 1919 to 1944]. In Dobre, Florica; Dobre, Dumitru (eds.). Statul Major General în Arhitectura Organismului Militar Românesc [Role of the General Staff in Building the Romanian Military's Structure] (PDF) (in Romanian). Pitești, Romania: Centrul Tehnic-Editorial al Armatei București. Archived from the original (PDF) on 2021-01-19.
- Gáborová, Jana (9 May 2017). "Konec války v Prostějově připomene rumunský tank" [The End of the War in Prostějov Will Be Commemorated by a Romanian Tank]. prostejov.eu. Public4u.
- Gil-Martínez, Eduardo M. (September 20, 2018). Romanian Armored Forces in World War II. Lublin, Poland: Kagero. ISBN 978-8395157530.
- Goncharov, Vladislav (26 August 2016). "Легенда о "бригаде Циглера"" [Legend of the Ziegler Brigade]. warspot.ru. Wargaming.
- Kliment, Charles K.; Doyle, Hilary Louis (1979). Czechoslovak Armoured Fighting Vehicles 1918–1945. Watford: Bellona Publications. ISBN 978-0852426289.
- Kliment, Charles K.; Francev, Vladimír (January 1, 2004). Československá obrněná vozidla 1918–1948 (in Czech). Prague: Ares & Naše Vojsko. ISBN 80-86158-40-3.
- Moșneagu, Marian [in Romanian]; Boțoghină, Iulian-Stelian; Manolescu, Mariana-Daniela; Stoica, Leontin-Vasile; Șoitariu, Mihai-Cosmin (2012). Armata română și evoluția armei tancuri. Documente (1919–1945) [The Romanian Army and the Evolution of the Tank Weapon. Documents (1919–1945)] (PDF) (in Romanian). Pitești, Romania: Editura Universității de Stat din Pitești. ISBN 978-606-560-252-6. Archived from the original (PDF) on 2021-01-19.
- Pasholok, Yuri (6 March 2017). "Большой успех маленьких танков" [Big Success of Small Tanks]. warspot.ru. Wargaming.
- Pasholok, Yuri (5 June 2021). "Чехословацкий малый танк для румынской армии" [Small Czechoslovak Tank for the Romanian Army]. zen.yandex.ru.
- Pejčoch, Ivo [in Czech]; Pejs, Oldřich (2004). Obrněná technika 5: Střední Evropa 1919–1945 (I. část) [Armored Vehicles 5: Central Europe 1919–1945 (Part 1)] (in Czech). Prague: Vašut. ISBN 9788072363179.
- Pejčoch, Ivo; Pejs, Oldřich (2005). Obrněná technika 6: Střední Evropa 1919–1945 (II. část) [Armored Vehicles 6: Central Europe 1919–1945 (Part 2)] (in Czech). Prague: Vašut. ISBN 8072364294.
- Scafeș, Cornel; Șerbănescu, Horia Vl.; Scafeș, Ioan I. (2011) [2005 by Oscar Print]. Trupele blindate din Armata Română (1919–1947) [Armored Troops of the Romanian Army (1919–1947)] (in Romanian). Bucharest: Alpha MDN. ISBN 9789731390741.
- Spielberger, Walter J. (1990). Die Panzer-Kampfwagen 35(t) und 38(t) und ihre Abarten einschließlich der tschechoslowakischen Heeresmotorisierung 1920–1945 [Panzer 35(t) and 38(t) and Their Variants Within the Motorization of the Czechoslovak Army 1920–1945] (in German). Stuttgart: Motorbuch Verlag. ISBN 3-87943-708-4.
- Špitálský, Jaroslav (17 August 2017). "Tančík AH-IV-R" [AH-IV-R tankette]. rotanazdar.cz (in Czech).
- Ștefănescu, Alexandru V. (2020). În umbra marelui Reich: Tehnica de luptă a armatei române pe Frontul de Est (1941–1944) [In the Shadow of the Great Reich: Battle Technique of the Romanian Army on the Eastern Front (1941–1944)] (in Romanian). Târgoviște, Romania: Cetatea de Scaun. ISBN 9786065375055.
- Volonchuk, Fedor Fedorovich [in Russian] (1961). По тылам врага [At the Rear of the Enemy] (in Russian). Moscow: Military Publishing.
- Zaloga, Steven J. (2013). Tanks of Hitler's Eastern Allies 1941–45. New Vanguard 131. Oxford, UK: Osprey Publishing. ISBN 978-1-78096-020-3.
