= Tatra T-III =

Prototype tanks produced by Tatra in 1936

Tatra T-III (T-78)
- Place of origin: Czechoslovakia

Production history
- Manufacturer: Tatra (company)
- Produced: 1936
- No. built: 2

Specifications
- Mass: 36,156 lb (16.400 t)
- Length: 19 ft (5.8 m)
- length: 123 mm (4.8 in)
- Width: 8.5 ft (2.6 m)
- Crew: 4
- Main armament: Škoda 47mm A9a
- Secondary armament: 2xZB-53 machine guns
- Engine: 11 cyl., water cooled, gasoline, 18.030 ccm 276.1 bhp at 2,000 rpm
- Ground clearance: 39 in
- Operational range: 62 mi (road)
- Maximum speed: 22 mph (road)
- References: https://www.armedconflicts.com/CZK-Tatra-T-III-t19490

The Tatra T-III (T-78) consists of two prototype medium tanks produced by Tatra, produced in 1936, designed to compete against the Skoda S-III as part of the Category III initiative for a tank with up to 37 mm thick armor.

== Background ==
The Ministry of Defense tasked Tatra to create two prototypes tanks on 18 November 1932. While Tatra had experience building automobiles, they had no experience building armored vehicles or tanks. Armament and turrets were to be provided by Škoda Works, though only one turret was created. Various technical issues and multiple requirement changes, including communication issues with Skoda and hull changes, meant that the T-III and S-III wound up facing each other in trials, despite Tatra having a head start. Trials began on 22 February 1937 with the T-III/I (no turret, heavy tracks) and (turret and light tracks installed). Mechanical defects and breakdowns were abundant between the pair, which caused Captain Karel Dvořák to state that they were not combat worthy under any circumstances and needed a total rework. Despite this, continued development (and continued breakdowns) was carried on until spring 1938, when Tatra asked the Ministry of Defense if they could discontinue development and scrap what remained of the hulls, for which they were paid 1,600,000 Czechoslovak koruna. The prototypes were transferred to the Vyškov Attack Vehicle Training Center for training purposes on 21 November 1938. One hull was used for educational purposes while the other was used for target practice, though one was supposedly analyzed by the Wehrmacht.
