= R-3 tank =

R-3
- Type: Medium tank
- Place of origin: Romania/Czechoslovakia

Production history
- Designer: Škoda
- Designed: 1938-1940
- No. built: 0 – remained a proposal only. Romania exclusively used the prototype during trials.

Specifications (S-II-c)
- Mass: 17 tonnes (17 long tons; 19 short tons)
- Crew: 4
- Armor: 30 millimetres (1.2 in)
- Main armament: 4.7 cm KPÚV vz. 38 gun
- Secondary armament: 2 x 7.92 mm machine gun
- Engine: 4-cylinder, water-cooled, 13.8 litre, Škoda gasoline 250 horsepower (190 kW)
- Suspension: leaf spring
- Maximum speed: 50 kilometres per hour (31 mph)

R-3 was a proposed Romanian tank design for use in World War II. It was basically a variant of the Czechoslovak S-II-c tank prototype (known as the T-21 tank after 1939), which was itself a variant of the Panzer 35(t) tank with pneumatic steering which was going to be built in Romania because of the repeated acquisition failures. Because of political reasons and the limited industrial capacities of both Škoda Works and the Romanian industry, the design never entered production.

== History ==
In the summer of 1940, Romania's traditional interwar arms delivery partners, France and Czechoslovakia, were under German occupation. Romania's armored forces were equipped with 126 light R-2 tanks (LT vz. 35s), 75 Renault R-35 tanks (41 of which were interned Polish tanks), 35 R-1 tankettes and 75 obsolete Renault FT tanks. As the country was basically surrounded by hostile neighbours from all sides and the Renault R-35 tank deliveries were stopped, the Romanian Army sought to buy a medium tank.

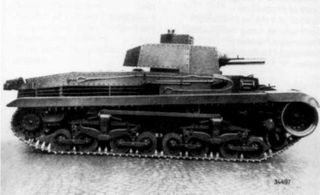
The Škoda S-II-c prototype, on which the R-3 would have been based

The chosen design was the Czechoslovak S-II-c prototype, the successor of the LT vz. 35 light tank. The Romanian trials and field testing of the tank started in late 1939. This choice came naturally, as Romanian troops were already familiar with its predecessor. The prototype was later designated by Škoda Works as the T-21 medium tank. Nazi Germany refused to deliver tanks to Romania because the country was not yet part of the Axis.

In August 1940, the talks were resumed, as Germany sold the license of an improved variant of the T-21 tank to Hungary. The Hungarian engineers improved the two T-22 prototypes sent to them by Germany and used these as the basis for their 40M Turán I medium tank. Romania, now part of the Axis, placed an order for 216 tanks in January 1941, but Germany couldn't deliver the tanks because of the limited resources. The delivery would have disrupted the production of other tanks.

In June 1941, Romania ordered 287 R-3 tanks from Škoda, but Germany only delivered 26 worn-out Panzer 35(t)s. Rebuffed repeatedly, Romania eventually offered to build the tanks locally, but the country lacked the industrial resources to produce medium tanks and the project was eventually canceled.
