= Stridsvagn m/37 =

Swedish tankette

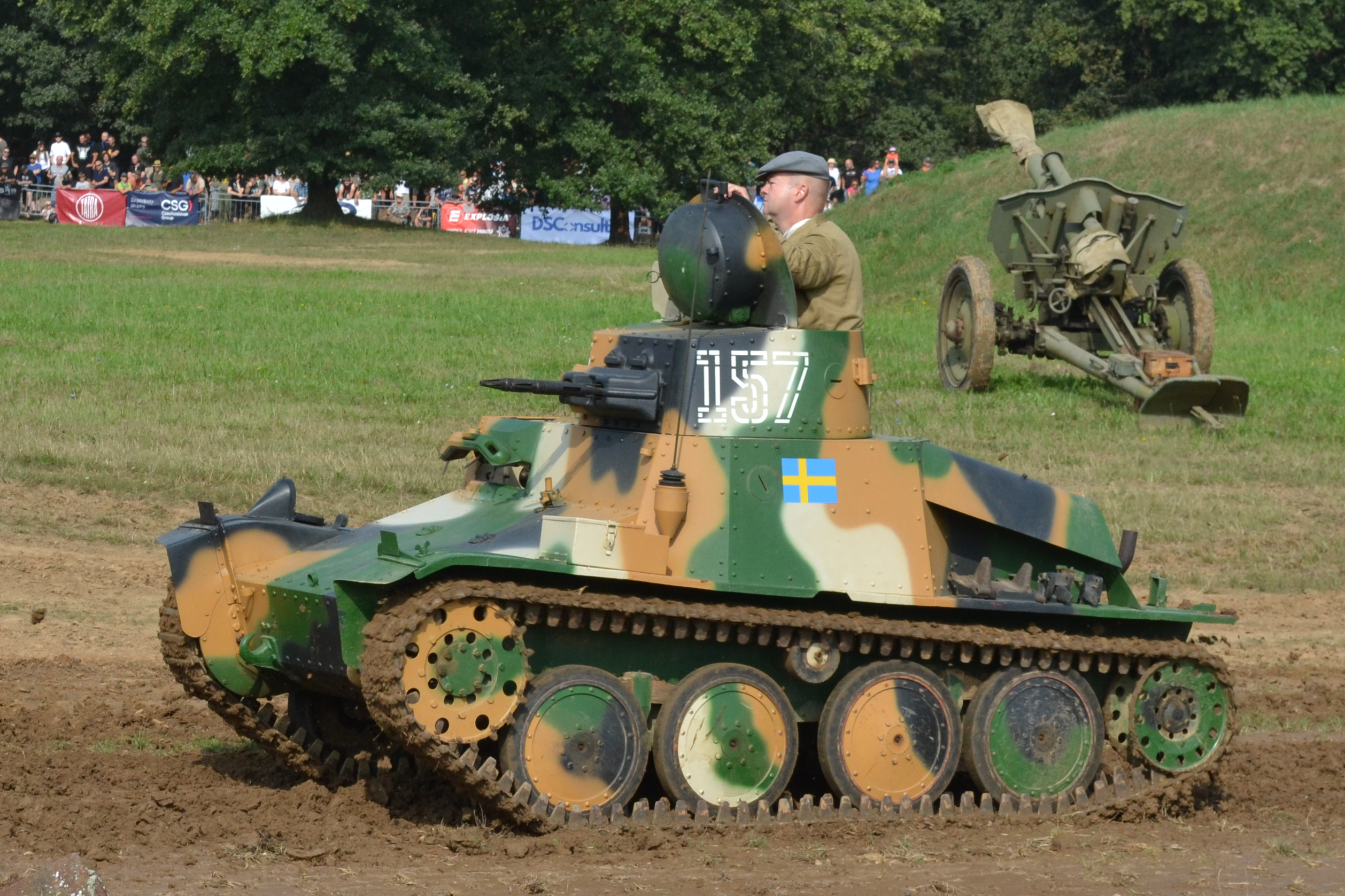
- Stridsvagn m/37 of the Military Technical Museum Lešany
- Type: Tankette
- Place of origin: Czechoslovakia

Service history
- In service: 1938-1953
- Used by: Sweden

Production history
- Designer: ČKD
- Manufacturer: ČKD; Jungner
- Produced: 1938-1939
- No. built: 48

Specifications
- Mass: 4.5 t (5.0 short tons; 4.4 long tons)
- Length: 3.4 m (11 ft 2 in)
- Width: 1.85 m (6 ft 1 in)
- Height: 1.95 m (6 ft 5 in)
- Crew: 2
- Armor: 6–15 mm (0.24–0.59 in)
- Main armament: 2× 8 mm m/36 machine guns with 3960 rounds
- Engine: Volvo FC-CKD 4.39 litre 6-cylinder OHV petrol engine 85 hp
- Power/weight: 18.9 hp/tonne
- Transmission: 5 speed Praga-Wilson preselected gearbox
- Operational range: 200 km (120 mi)
- Maximum speed: 60 km/h (37 mph)

Stridsvagn m/37 (Strv m/37) was a Swedish-built version of the Czechoslovak ČKD AH-IV tankette.

== History ==
The AH-IV was popular with Romania and Iran, and after a successful demonstration to Swedish authorities, during winter conditions in the Krkonoše Mountains, Sweden ordered 48 AH-IV-Sv in 1937. Two of these were built in Czechoslovakia; the other 46 were built as the Strv m/37 under license by Jungner in Oskarshamn, with Volvo providing a more powerful engine, transmission, and tracks, the armor was made by Avesta. ČKD supplied most of the other components after building one prototype. The tankette was heavily modified, including the removal of the driver's machine gun. This variant was heavier and larger than the AH-IV. On the turret were mounted two Swedish-made machine guns, the 8 mm Ksp m/36 strv, and a commander's cupola. Inside the vehicle was room for a radio and the ammunition. In November 1938, the final components were shipped.

== Production ==
A total of 48 of these vehicles were delivered to the Swedish army in 1938 and 1939.

== Service ==
The Strv m/37s were first issued to the 1st Armored Battalion. Between 1943—44, were transferred to the newly formed armored brigades. Subsequently, the tankettes were in service with the infantry regiments I 2, I 9, I 10 and P 1 G Armored Company on Gotland. The Strv m/37s lasted in service on Gotland until 1953, when they were withdrawn from service.

== Survivors ==
Eight of these tanks survive to this day, four in running order, of which one is in the Regimental Museum Strängnäs, Sweden.

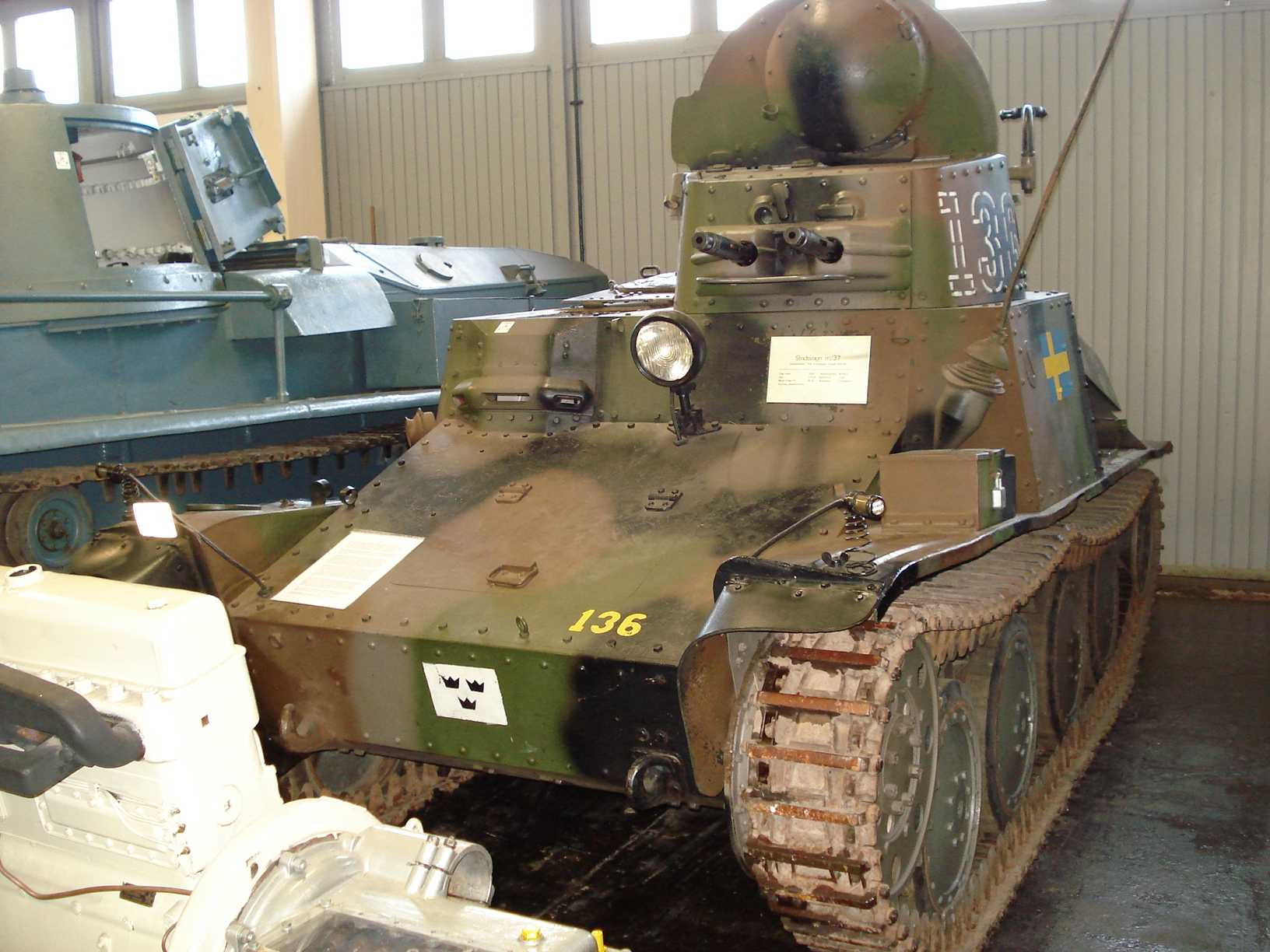
Stridsvagn m/37 on display at Swedish Army Museum in Stockholm, Sweden.

== Comparable vehicles ==
- Czechoslovakia: AH-IV
- Germany: Panzer I
- Italy: L3/33 • L3/35
- Japan: Type 94
- Poland: TK-3 and TKS
- Romania: R-1 (also an AH-IV version)
- Soviet Union: T-27 • T-37A • T-38
- United Kingdom: Light Tank Mk VI
