= Václav Holek =

Czech firearm engineer (1886–1954)

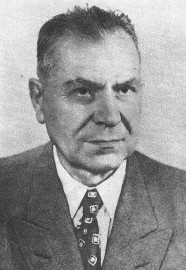
- Václav Holek
- Born: 24 September 1886; Malé Nepodřice, Bohemia, Austria-Hungary
- Died: 13 December 1954 (aged 68); Brno, Czechoslovakia
- Occupation: firearm engineer
- Years active: 1905–1950
- Known for: Designing of weapons
- Notable work: Bren light machine gun Besa machine gun

Václav Holek (24 September 1886 – 13 December 1954) was a Czech firearm engineer who applied for over 75 patents.

== Life ==
Václav Holek was born in Malé Nepodřice, southern Bohemia, on 24 September 1886. He completed his apprenticeship as a gunsmith and studied afterward in Písek. In 1905, he started working with an Anton Mulacz company in Vienna. In 1910, he acquired a job with the gunsmith Jan Nowotný in Prague, where he took part in refining Holland & Holland system shotguns. During World War I, the company produced artillery guns for the Austro-Hungarian Army.

In 1918, Holek switched to the Zbrojovka Praga, a firearm company newly established by the son of Holek's former boss, Jan Nowotný. Here, a service semi-automatic pistol designated for the Czechoslovak Army and police designed by Holek existed. And it was here where, in the springtime of 1921, Václav Holek constructed a light machine gun from which the Czechoslovak Army light machine gun PRAGA vz. 24 was born, the predecessor of the ZB vz. 26 light machine gun. (Later, the British Royal Small Arms Factory of Enfield bought the license and produced some 220,000 guns marked as Bren.)

In December 1924, Holek switched to the Československá zbrojovka in Brno, where, in the 1930s, he developed the ZB-53 machine gun, of which 60,000 pieces marked as Besa machine gun were produced in Britain.

During World War II and in the post-war years, Václav Holek developed several modern semi-automatic weapons, of which only the Vz. 52 light machine guns saw the production line.

Holek died on 13 November 1954 in Brno at the age of 68.

== Literature ==
- Lubomir Popelinský: Československé automatické zbraně [Czechoslovak automatic weapons], Prague 1999
