= Oldřichov (Tábor District) =

- Municipality
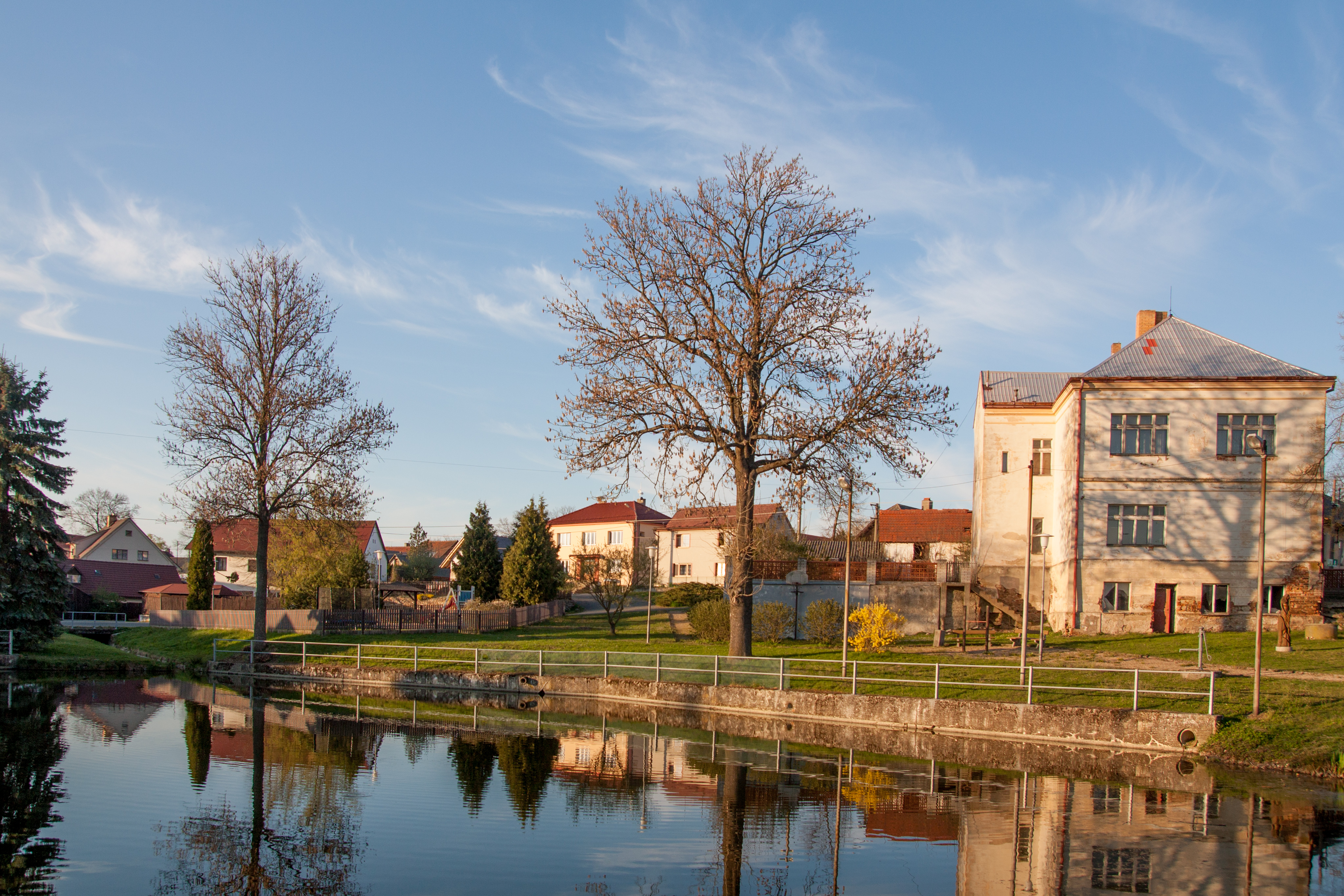
- Centre of Oldřichov

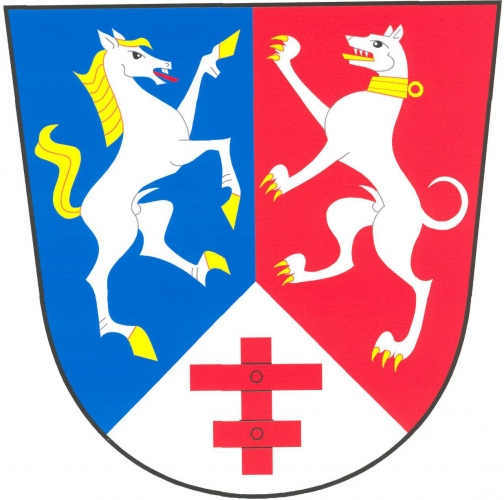
- Flag Coat of arms

- Location in the Czech Republic
- Coordinates: 49°33′32″N 14°45′15″E
- Country: Czech Republic
- Region: South Bohemian
- District: Tábor
- First mentioned: 1352

Area
  - Total: 10.09 km^{2} (3.90 sq mi)
- Elevation: 503 m (1,650 ft)

Population (2026-01-01)
  - Total: 238
  - Density: 23.6/km^{2} (61.1/sq mi)
- Time zone: UTC+1 (CET)
  - Summer (DST): UTC+2 (CEST)
- Postal code: 391 43
- Website: www.obec-oldrichov.cz

Oldřichov is a municipality and village in Tábor District in the South Bohemian Region of the Czech Republic. It has about 200 inhabitants.

Oldřichov lies approximately 18 kilometres (11 mi) north-east of Tábor, 68 km (42 mi) north of České Budějovice, and 64 km (40 mi) south of Prague.

== Demographics ==
Historical population
Year	Pop.	±%
1869	445	—
1880	504	+13.3%
1890	464	−7.9%
1900	517	+11.4%
1910	499	−3.5%
1921	496	−0.6%
1930	382	−23.0%
1950	334	−12.6%
1961	296	−11.4%
1970	230	−22.3%
1980	242	+5.2%
1991	256	+5.8%
2001	235	−8.2%
2011	214	−8.9%
2021	231	+7.9%
Source: Censuses
