= TACAM R-1 =

Romanian tank destroyer project

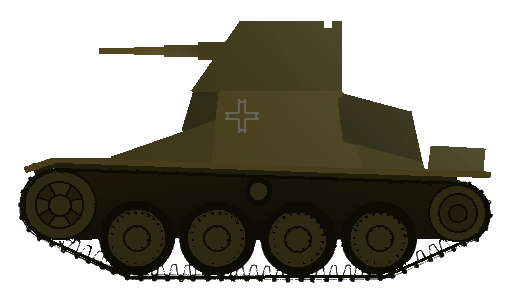
- Reconstruction of what the TACAM R-1 would have looked like, based on its description.
- Type: Tank Destroyer
- Place of origin: Kingdom of Romania

Service history
- Wars: World War II

Production history
- Designed: 1943
- No. built: 14

Specifications (R-1)
- Length: 3.2 metres (10 ft)
- Width: 1.73 metres (5.7 ft)
- Main armament: 1 x 45 mm 45 mm 20-K
- Secondary armament: 1 x 7.92 mm ZB-53 machine gun
- Engine: 6-cylinder, water-cooled Praga RHP; 55 horsepower (41 kW)
- Transmission: 5-speed Praga-Wilson
- Suspension: leaf spring

The TACAM R-1 (Tun Anticar pe Afet Mobil R-1 – "Anti-tank gun on R-1 mobile gun carriage") was a small tank destroyer used by Romania during World War II. It was designed on 22 November 1943 at the request of the Romanian General Staff. Fourteen R-1 vehicles were to be rearmed with 45 mm 20-K guns. Although this vehicle was designed to be used only for security duties, the project was cancelled because it was eventually regarded as a waste of badly needed industrial capacity, the 45 mm gun having been obsolete against most Soviet tanks by then such as the T-34 and KV-1.

== See also ==
- R-1 tank
- other TACAM tank destroyers
