= TACAM =

TACAM may refer to:

- Tactical Assault Camouflage, a US camouflage pattern
- Tun anticar pe afet mobil (Romanian for "Anti-tank gun on mobile gun carriage")

- TACAM R-2, Romanian-produced World War II tank destroyer
- TACAM T-60, Romanian-produced World War II tank destroyer
- TACAM R-1, Proposed Romanian World War II tank destroyer
- TACAM T-38, Proposed Romanian World War II tank destroyer

== See also ==
- TACAMO
