= Oldřichov (Přerov District) =

- Municipality
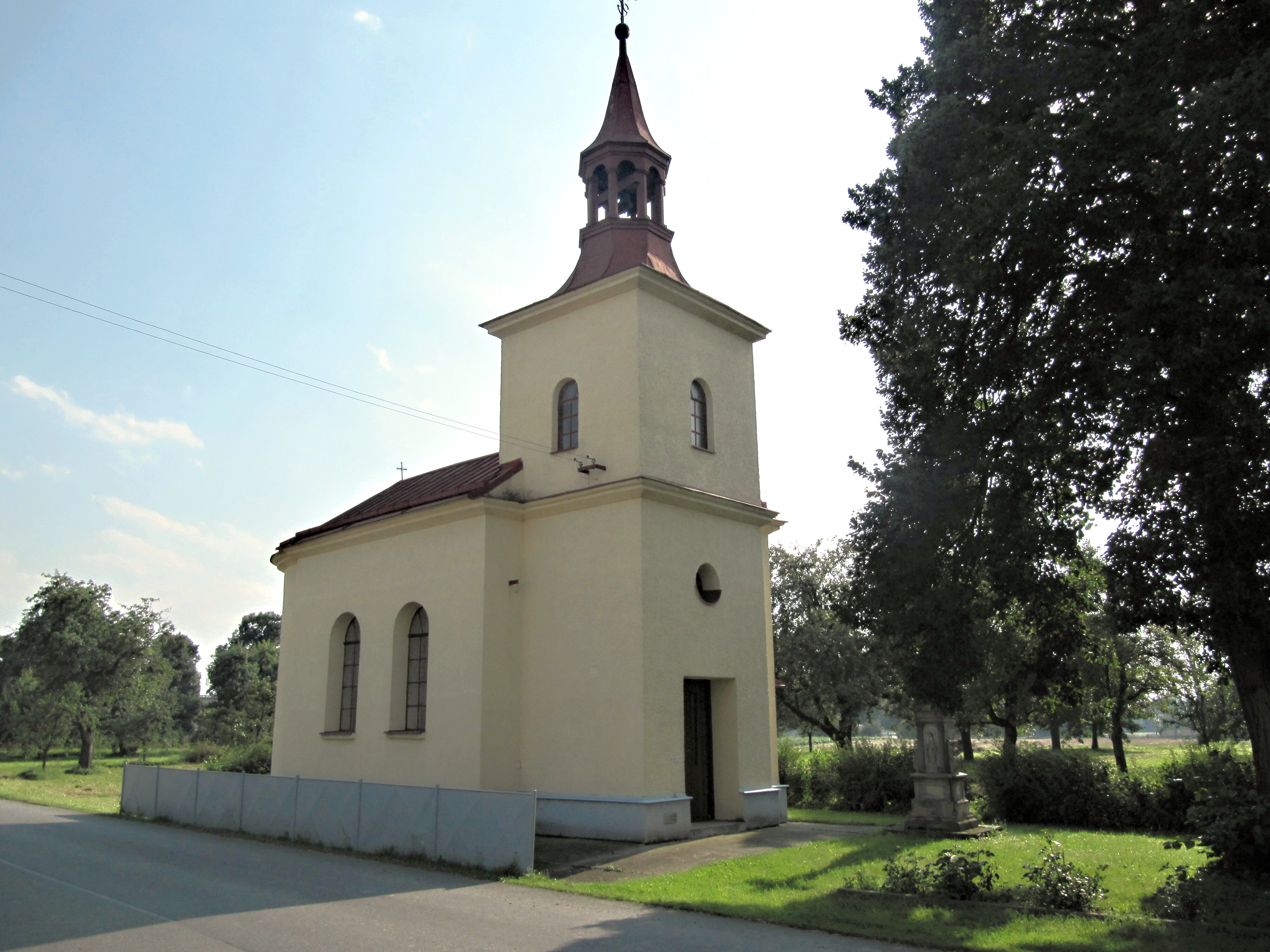
- Chapel of Saints Philip and James

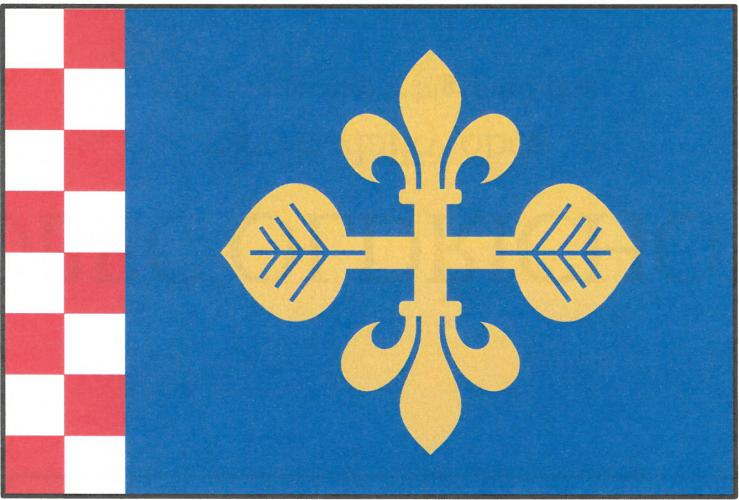
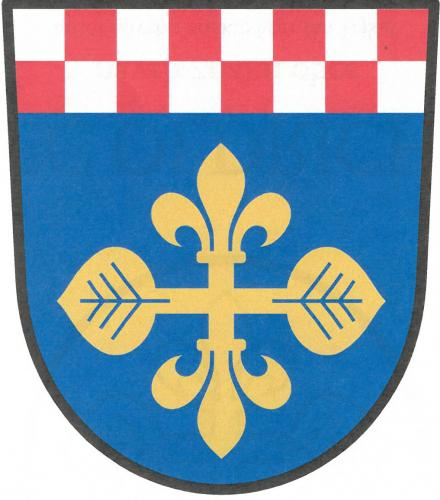
- Flag Coat of arms

- Location in the Czech Republic
- Coordinates: 49°29′51″N 17°32′21″E
- Country: Czech Republic
- Region: Olomouc
- District: Přerov
- First mentioned: 1787

Area
  - Total: 0.95 km^{2} (0.37 sq mi)
- Elevation: 222 m (728 ft)

Population (2026-01-01)
  - Total: 110
  - Density: 120/km^{2} (300/sq mi)
- Time zone: UTC+1 (CET)
  - Summer (DST): UTC+2 (CEST)
- Postal code: 751 11
- Website: oldrichovnamorave.cz

Oldřichov is a municipality and village in Přerov District in the Olomouc Region of the Czech Republic. It has about 100 inhabitants.

Oldřichov lies approximately 9 kilometres (6 mi) north-east of Přerov, 24 km (15 mi) south-east of Olomouc, and 234 km (145 mi) east of Prague.

== History ==
Oldřichov was founded in 1787. It was originally named Ulrychovice and renamed to its current name in 1920.

== Demographics ==
Historical population
Year	Pop.	±%
1869	105	—
1880	132	+25.7%
1890	121	−8.3%
1900	126	+4.1%
1910	142	+12.7%
1921	136	−4.2%
1930	149	+9.6%
1950	114	−23.5%
1961	132	+15.8%
1970	108	−18.2%
1980	107	−0.9%
1991	110	+2.8%
2001	126	+14.5%
2011	125	−0.8%
2021	113	−9.6%
Source: Censuses
