= Dobev =

- Municipality
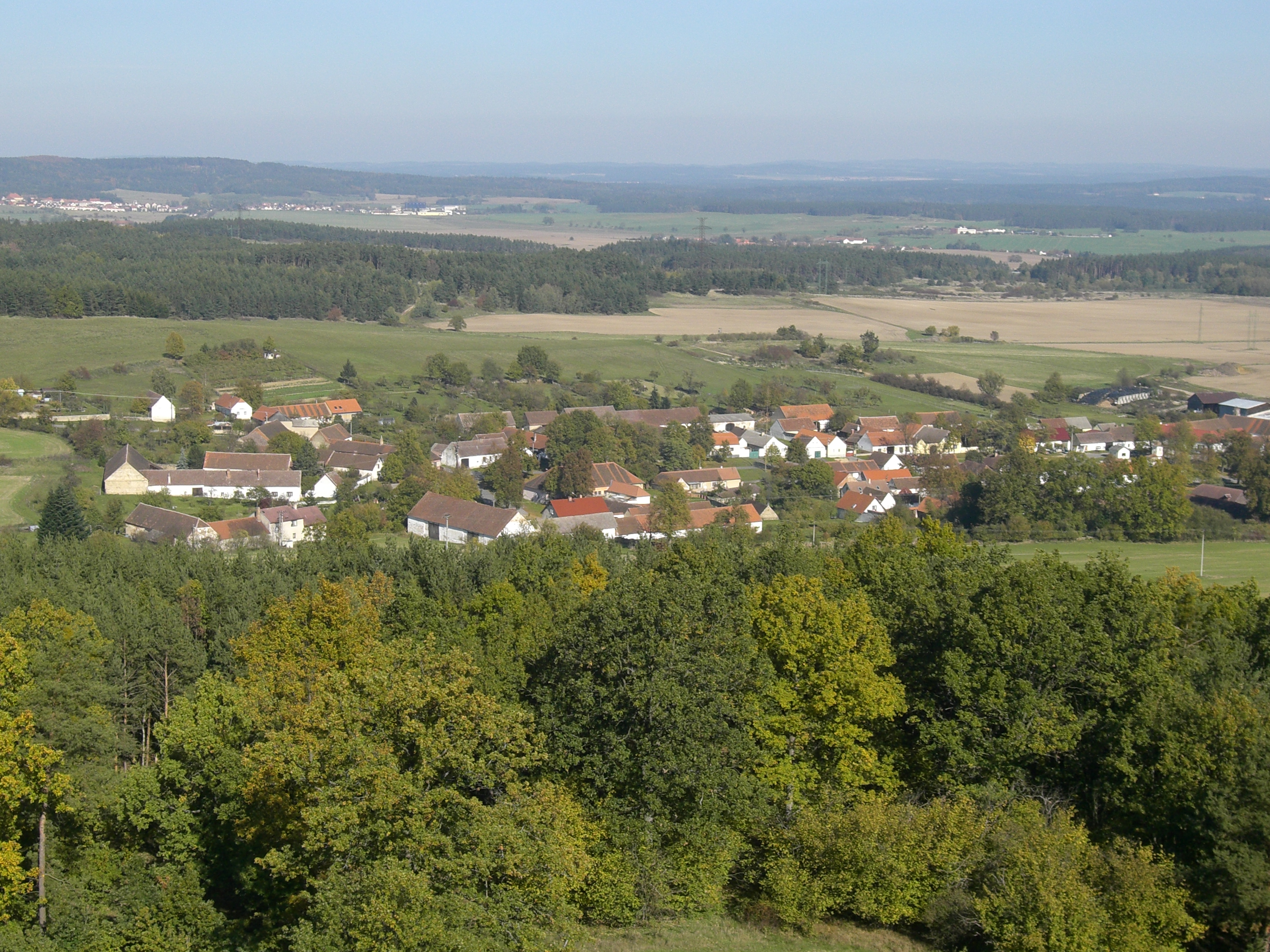
- Velké Nepodřice, a part of Dobev

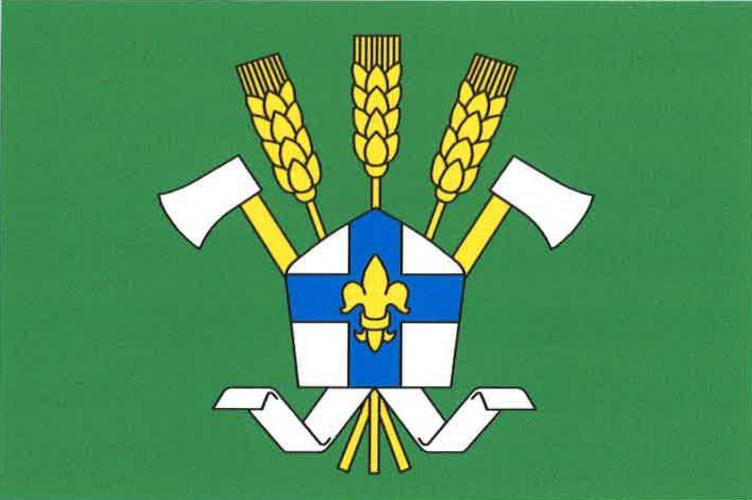
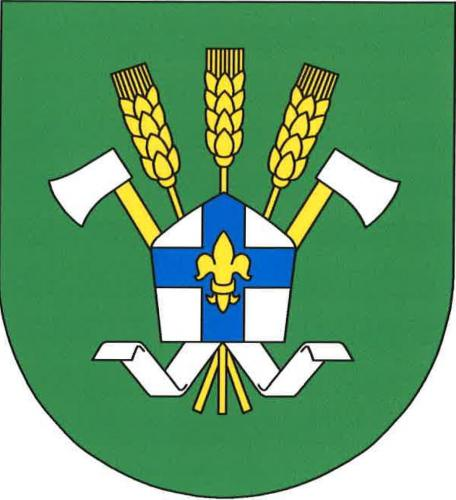
- Flag Coat of arms

- Location in the Czech Republic
- Coordinates: 49°17′45″N 14°2′50″E
- Country: Czech Republic
- Region: South Bohemian
- District: Písek
- First mentioned: 1318

Area
  - Total: 21.22 km^{2} (8.19 sq mi)
- Elevation: 385 m (1,263 ft)

Population (2026-01-01)
  - Total: 1,178
  - Density: 55.51/km^{2} (143.8/sq mi)
- Time zone: UTC+1 (CET)
  - Summer (DST): UTC+2 (CEST)
- Postal code: 397 01
- Website: www.obecdobev.cz

Dobev is a municipality in Písek District in the South Bohemian Region of the Czech Republic. It has about 1,200 inhabitants.

== Administrative division ==
Dobev consists of five municipal parts (in brackets population according to the 2021 census):

- Malé Nepodřice (130)
- Nová Dobev (181)
- Oldřichov (252)
- Stará Dobev (275)
- Velké Nepodřice (147)

The municipal office is located in Stará Dobev.

== Etymology ==
The name Dobev is derived from the personal name Dobev.

== Geography ==
Dobev is located about 7 kilometres (4 mi) west of Písek and 46 km (29 mi) northwest of České Budějovice. The western part of the municipal territory lies in the České Budějovice Basin, the eastern part lies in the Tábor Uplands. The highest point is the hill Velký Kamýk at 531 m (1,742 ft) above sea level. The municipality contains several fishponds, the largest of which is Dobevský rybník.

== History ==
The first written mention of Dobev is from 1318. During the rule of Jindřich of Schwamberg, the village became part of the Kestřany estate. There was a fortress in Dobev, but when it ceased to serve as a noble residence, it fell into disrepair. It was described as abandoned in 1642.

At the end of the 18th century, the village of Nová Dobev ('new Dobev') founded as a settlement of timber rafters. Dobev then became known as Stará Dobev ('old Dobev').

== Demographics ==
Historical population

Year	Pop.	±%
1869	1,382	—
1880	1,345	−2.7%
1890	1,364	+1.4%
1900	1,399	+2.6%
1910	1,310	−6.4%

Year	Pop.	±%
1921	1,246	−4.9%
1930	1,190	−4.5%
1950	920	−22.7%
1961	935	+1.6%
1970	795	−15.0%

Year	Pop.	±%
1980	719	−9.6%
1991	663	−7.8%
2001	699	+5.4%
2011	820	+17.3%
2021	985	+20.1%

Source: Censuses

== Transport ==
Dobev is situated on a second-class road from Písek to Strakonice. The D4 motorway runs through the northwestern part of the municipal territory.

== Sights ==
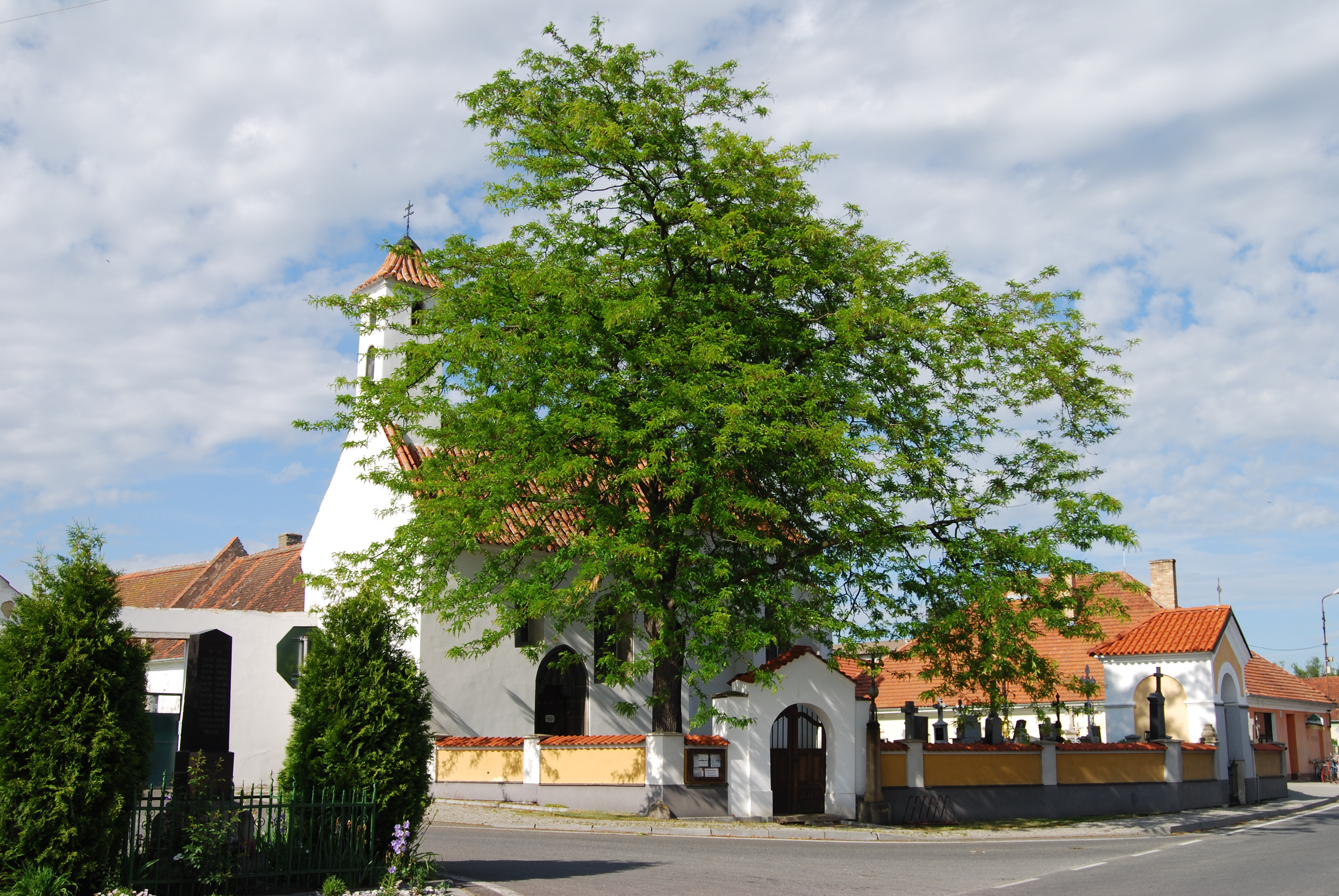
Centre of Stará Dobev with the Church of Saint Brice

The main landmark of Dobev is the Church of Saint Brice from the late 14th century. The originally Gothic church was rebuilt in 1881.

== Notable people ==
- Václav Holek (1886–1954), firearm engineer
