= ZB vz. 37 =

ZB-53, Vz.37
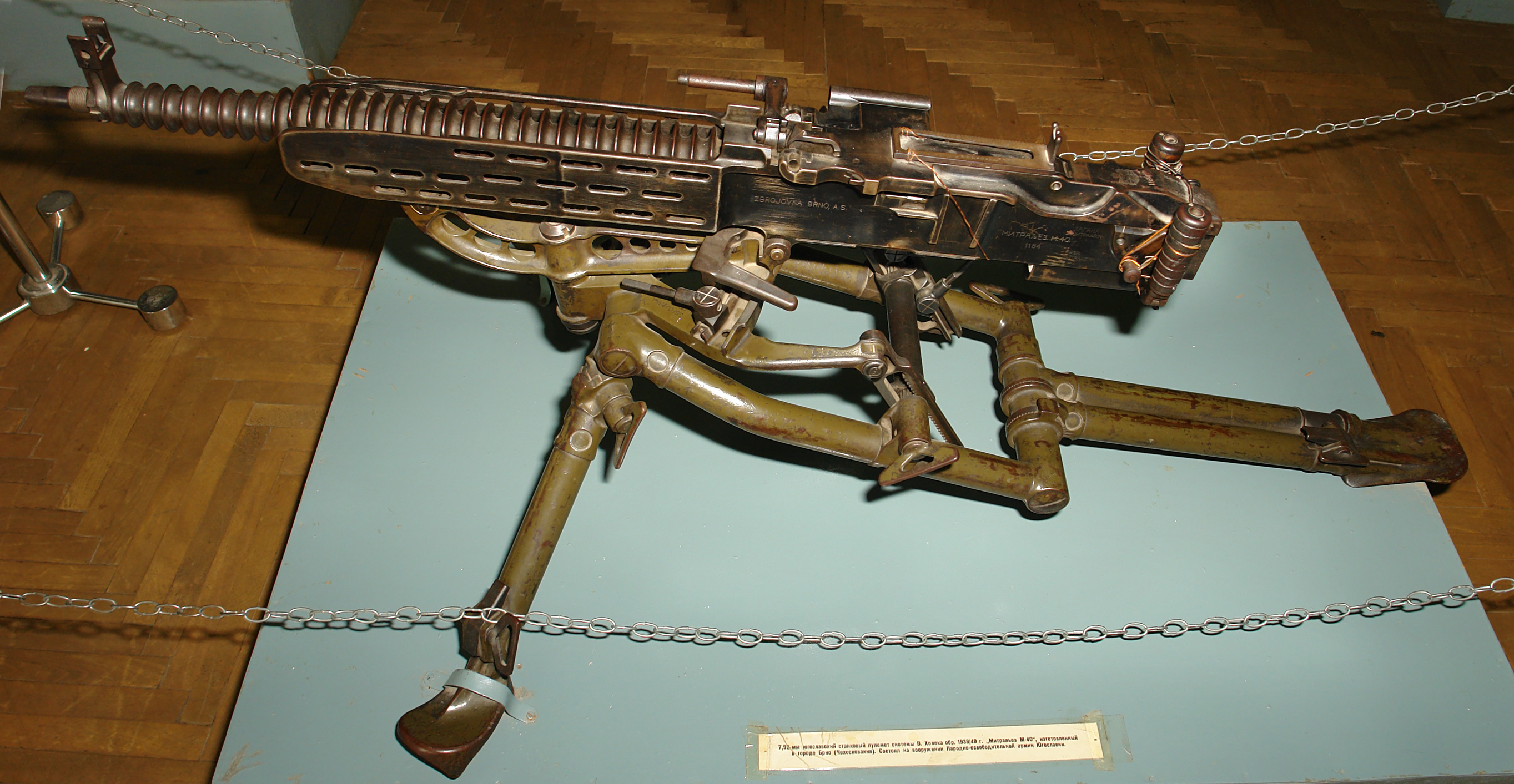
- Type: Medium machine gun
- Place of origin: Czechoslovakia

Service history
- In service: 1937–1960s (Czechoslovakia)
- Used by: See Users
- Wars: Spanish Civil War; World War II; Second Sino-Japanese War; 1948 Palestine war Cyprus Emergency; Portuguese Colonial War; Vietnam War; Bangladesh Liberation War; Bay of Pigs Invasion; Nigerian Civil War; Turkish invasion of Cyprus; South African Border War; Soviet–Afghan War; United States invasion of Panama

Production history
- Designer: Václav Holek
- Designed: 1935
- Manufacturer: Zbrojovka Brno; Zbrojovka Vsetín
- Produced: 1936–early 1950s

Specifications
- Mass: 21 kg (46 lb) empty
- Length: 1.105 m (43.5 in)
- Barrel length: 0.736 m (29.0 in)
- Cartridge: 7.92×57mm Mauser; 7.62×45mm
- Action: Gas-operated
- Rate of fire: 500–800 rounds/min
- Feed system: 225-round metal link belt

The ZB-53 was a Czechoslovak machine gun. A versatile weapon, it was used both as a squad support weapon, as a mounted machine gun for tanks and other armoured vehicles, and on fixed positions inside Czechoslovak border fortifications. Adopted before World War II by the armies of Czechoslovakia (as Těžký kulomet vz. 37, heavy machine gun model 37) and Romania, it was also license-built in the United Kingdom as the Besa machine gun. Following the German invasion of Czechoslovakia, large quantities of the weapon were captured by the Wehrmacht and used during the war under the designation of MG 37(t).

== History ==
The ZB-53 was designed as a private venture by Václav Holek and Miroslav Rolčík of the Zbrojovka Brno works as a replacement for the Schwarzlose machine gun of World War I origin. Czechoslovakia purchased 500 for testing giving them the designation Vz.35 ("1935 Model"). Based on these tests some improvements were requested and the improved ZB-53 was adopted by the Czechoslovak Army with the designation TK vz. 37 ("Heavy Machine Gun Mark 1937"). (Note: "TK" stands for "těžký kulomet", heavy machine gun, while "vz" means "vzor", Model) It was introduced as the standard machine gun of Czechoslovak LT-35 and LT-38 tanks. Czechoslovak Zbrojovka Brno and then Zbrojovka Vsetín produced the gun in large quantities until the 1950s.

Czechoslovakia exported the gun to Romania, Yugoslavia (1,000 pcs in March-April 1940), Argentina, Afghanistan, Iran and China (large numbers were used during the Second Sino-Japanese War), while UK bought a licence and started to produce its own version, known as the Besa machine gun (over 60,000 pieces made). During the German occupation of the factory, large numbers were produced for the Waffen-SS until 1942.

== Description ==
The weapon was a gas-operated, belt-fed, air-cooled machine gun that served both the infantry support and vehicle weapons roles. The machine gun was delivered in three variants: infantry machine gun (on heavy tripod), heavy bunker machine gun (with heavier barrel, marked "O") and for armoured vehicles (marked "ÚV"). It was designed to withstand five minutes of constant fire, after which time the barrel had to be changed due to wear. Although modern, the weapon was prone to jamming due to a complicated rate of fire selection mechanism.

== Users ==
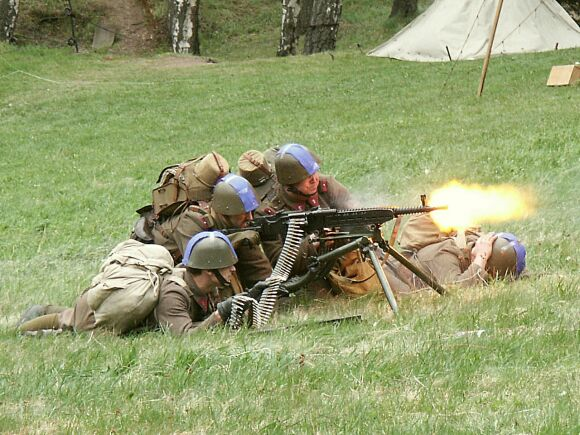
Reenactment of Czechoslovak soldiers with ZB vz. 37

- Afghanistan
- Argentina
- Bangladesh: Used by Mukti Bahini forces during the Bangladesh Liberation War
- Biafra: At least 20 were sold to Biafra in 1967.
- Chile
- China
- Czechoslovakia
- Cuba
- Cyprus
- Guatemala
- Iran
- Israel
- Namibia used by PLAN
- Nazi Germany
- Panama: Used by the defunct Panama Defense Forces, notably mounted on Jeeps.
- Peru: Installed as coaxial machine gun on 38/39M light tanks(Praga LTP) in Peruvian service
- Romania: 5,500 purchased by mid-1943
- Slovak Republic (1939–1945): Inherited from First Czechoslovak Republic. Used in fortification systems.
- Spain
- United Kingdom: Besa machine gun
- Venezuela
- Yugoslavia

== See also ==
- Besa machine gun
- ZB vz. 26
- Weapons of Czechoslovakia interwar period
