= List of equipment of the Biafran Army =

This is a list of equipment in service with the former Biafran Armed Forces.

A considerable number of Czechoslovak weapons were reportedly purchased in 1967, though Czechoslovakia officially denied a sale of weapons to the Biafran Armed Forces.

== Small arms ==
Name	Image	Caliber	Type	Origin	Notes
Submachine guns
CZ-23 and CZ-25		7.62×25mm Tokarev	Submachine gun	Czechoslovakia	300 bought at the beginning of 1967, though Czechoslovakia denied direct purchase.
CZ-247			Submachine gun	Czechoslovakia	
Lanchester Mk I		9×19mm Parabellum	Submachine gun	United Kingdom	Some used by mercenaries

Name	Image	Caliber	Type	Origin	Notes
Rifles
Dane guns			Rifle	Biafra	Locally made muskets. In service with militias
Lee-Enfield No.4		.303 British	Bolt-action rifle	United Kingdom	From ex-Nigerian Army stocks. 120 to 150 rifles in January 1967
Beretta BM 59		7.62×51mm NATO	Battle rifle	Italy	Captured from Nigerian Army.
Vz. 24 rifle		7.92×57mm Mauser	Bolt-action rifle	Czechoslovakia	1,860 bought at the beginning of 1967, though Czechoslovakia denied direct purchase.
Vz. 52 rifle		7.62×45mm	Semi-automatic rifle	Czechoslovakia	820 bought at the beginning of 1967, though Czechoslovakia denied direct purchase.
Vz. 58 rifle		7.62×39mm	Assault rifle	Czechoslovakia	732 bought at the beginning of 1967, though Czechoslovakia denied direct purchase.
MAS-36 rifle		7.5×54mm French	Bolt-action rifle	France	300 from Haiti as a gift in 1968. Gabon, Ivory Coast are also named as suppliers.
L1A1 SLR		7.62×51mm NATO	Semi-automatic rifle	United Kingdom	930 delivered by Parker-Hale in 1967;
FN FAL		7.62×51mm NATO	Battle rifle	Belgium	Some units captured from the Nigerian Army.
CETME rifle			Battle rifle	Spain	Captured from the Nigerian Army.
98-type Mausers		7.62×51mm NATO	Bolt-action rifle	German Empire	
Type 56 assault rifle		7.62×39mm	Assault rifle	China	In service with militias

Name	Image	Caliber	Type	Origin	Notes
Machine guns
Vz. 26 machine gun			Machine gun	Czechoslovakia	55 units of vz. 26, 30, 52 and 59 machine guns bought at the beginning of 1967, though Czechoslovakia denied direct purchase.
Vz. 30 machine gun			Machine gun	Czechoslovakia	
Vz. 52 machine gun			Machine gun	Czechoslovakia	
Vz. 59 machine gun			Machine gun	Czechoslovakia	
Vz. 37 heavy machine gun			Machine gun	Czechoslovakia	20 bought at the beginning of 1967, though Czechoslovakia denied direct purchase.
MG 34		7.92×57mm Mauser	General-purpose machine gun	Nazi Germany	
Bren		.303 British	General-purpose machine gun	United Kingdom	From ex-Nigerian Army stocks. ~12 guns in January 1967.

== Sources ==
- Jowett, Philip S. (2016). Modern African Wars (5): The Nigerian-Biafran War 1967–70. Oxford: Osprey Publishing Press. ISBN 978-1472816092.
