= List of equipment of the Guinea-Bissau Army =

This is a list of equipment of the Army of Guinea-Bissau in service.

Many of the weapons used by the military of Guinea-Bissau are of Warsaw Pact origin.

== Small arms ==
| Name | Image | Caliber | Type | Origin | Notes |
Pistols
| TT-33 | | 7.62×25mm | Semi-automatic pistol | Soviet Union | |
Submachine guns
| Sa 23 | | 9×19mm | Submachine gun | Czechoslovakia | |
| MAT-49 | | 9×19mm | Submachine gun | France | |
Rifles
| Vz. 52 | | 7.62×45mm | Semi-automatic rifle | Czechoslovakia | |
| SKS | | 7.62×39mm | Semi-automatic rifle | Soviet Union | |
| AK-47 | | 7.62×39mm | Assault rifle | Soviet Union | |
| AKM | | 7.62×39mm | Assault rifle | Soviet Union | |
| MAS-36 | | 7.5×54mm | Bolt-action rifle | France | |
Machine guns
| RPK | | 7.62×39mm | Squad automatic weapon | Soviet Union | |
| PKM | | 7.62×54mmR | General-purpose machine gun | Soviet Union | |
| KPV | | 14.5×114mm | Heavy machine gun | Soviet Union | |
| DShK | | 12.7×108mm | Heavy machine gun | Soviet Union | |
Rocket propelled grenade launchers
| RPG-7 | | 40mm | Rocket-propelled grenade | Soviet Union | |
| M20 Super bazooka | | 60mm | Rocket-propelled grenade | United States | |

=== Anti-tank weapons ===
| Name | Image | Type | Origin | Caliber | Notes |
|---|---|---|---|---|---|
| B-10 | | Recoilless rifle | Soviet Union | 82mm | |
| Type 52 | | Recoilless rifle | United States; China | 75mm | |

== Vehicles ==
=== Tanks ===
| Name | Image | Type | Origin | Quantity | Status | Notes |
|---|---|---|---|---|---|---|
| PT-76 | | Amphibious light tank | Soviet Union | 15 | | |
| T-55 | | Medium tank | Soviet Union | 10 | | |

=== Scout cars ===
| Name | Image | Type | Origin | Quantity | Status | Notes |
|---|---|---|---|---|---|---|
| BRDM-2 | | Amphibious armored scout car | Soviet Union | 10 | | |

=== Armored personnel carriers ===
| Name | Image | Type | Origin | Quantity | Status | Notes |
|---|---|---|---|---|---|---|
| Type 56 | | Armored personnel carrier | Soviet Union; China | 20 | | Acquired from China in 1984. |
| BTR-40 | | Armored personnel carrier | Soviet Union | 15 | | |
| BTR-60 | | Armored personnel carrier | Soviet Union | 35 | | |

=== Artillery ===
| Name | Image | Type | Origin | Quantity | Status | Notes |
Mortars
| PM-41 | | Mortar | Soviet Union | 8 | | |
| PM-43 | | Mortar | Soviet Union | 8 | | |
Field artillery
| BM-21 | | MLRS | Soviet Union | 9 | | |
| D-44 | | Field gun | Soviet Union | 8 | | |
| M-30 | | Howitzer | Soviet Union | 18 | | |
| D-30 | | Howitzer | Soviet Union | 18 | | |

=== Air defence systems ===
| Name | Image | Type | Origin | Quantity | Status | Notes |
|---|---|---|---|---|---|---|
| 61-K | | Autocannon | Soviet Union | 6 | | |
| S-60 | | Autocannon | Soviet Union | 10 | | |
| ZU-23-2 | | Autocannon | Soviet Union | 18 | | |
| 9K32 Strela-2 | | MANPADS | Soviet Union | | | |
