= Type 73 light machine gun =

Type 73
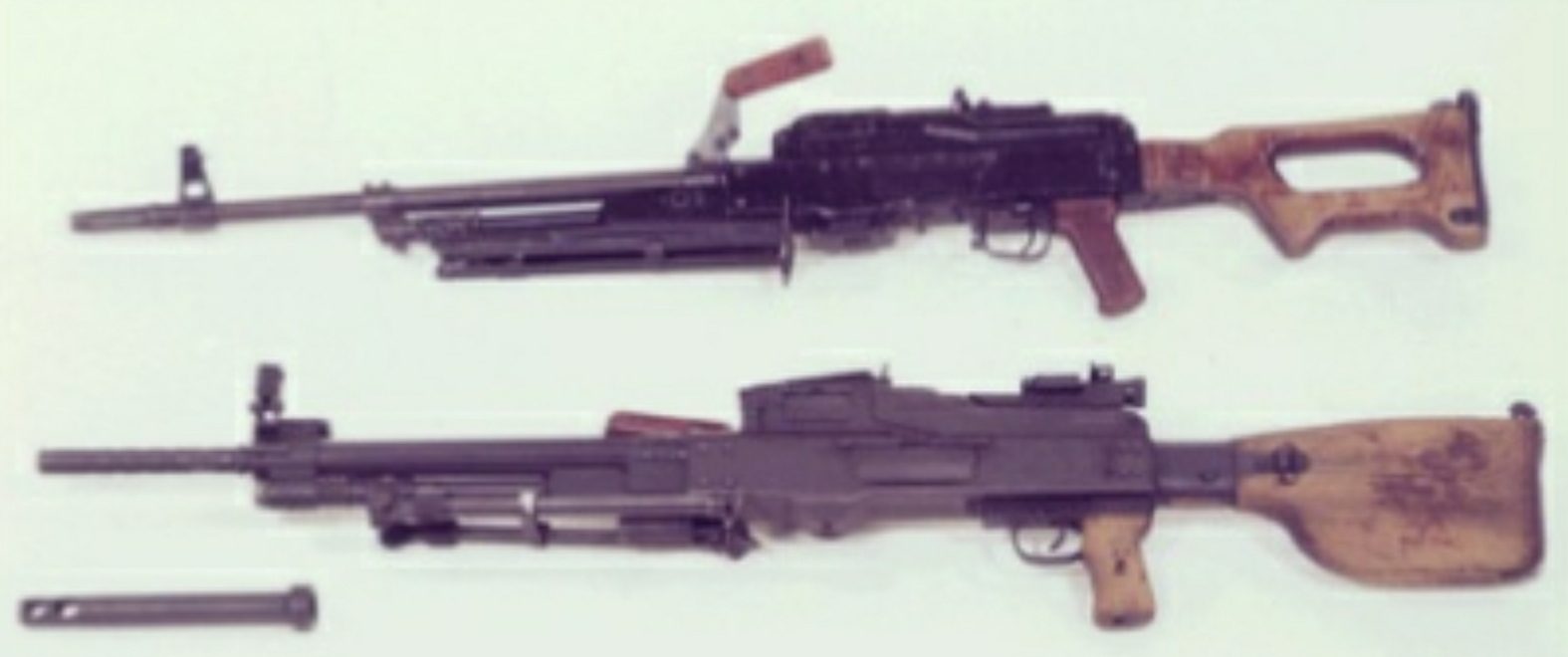
- A PKM machine gun (top) and a Type 73 machine gun (bottom)
- Type: Light machine gun
- Place of origin: North Korea

Service history
- Used by: See Users
- Wars: Iran–Iraq War; Lebanese Civil War; Syrian Civil War; Iraqi Civil War (2014–2017); Yemeni Civil War (2015–present); Russo-Ukrainian War

Production history
- Designer: First Machine Industry Bureau
- Designed: 1973

Specifications
- Mass: 10.6 kg (23 lb)
- Length: 1,190 mm (47 in)
- Barrel length: 608 mm (23.9 in)
- Cartridge: 7.62×54mmR
- Caliber: 7.62 mm
- Action: Gas
- Rate of fire: 600–700 rpm
- Feed system: Box magazine- or belt-feed
- Sights: iron sights

- Type 73 light machine gun
- Hangul: 73식대대기관총
- Hanja: 七三式大隊機關銃
- Revised Romanization: 73-sik daedae gigwanchong
- McCune–Reischauer: 73-sik taedae kigwanch'ong

The Type 73 is a light machine gun designed and manufactured by North Korea's First Machine Industry Bureau. It is used primarily by the Korean People's Army, and via Iran, has been exported throughout the Middle East. It has a superficial resemblance to the Bren light machine gun when loaded with the top-mounted box magazine.

== History ==
The Type 73 is based on a 1960s-era Soviet design, most likely the PK machine gun (PKM), although the date of its first production in North Korea is currently unknown. The weapon was reportedly seen in the Korean Demilitarized Zone in 2002, when a United Nations Command Military Armistice Commission team told media outlets that North Korean soldiers had set up numerous Type 73s in positions 100 to 400 meters north of the demarcation line. The weapons were reportedly removed at the end of each day.

Due to the North Korean government's policy of secrecy, information on the weapon is hard to obtain. One example has been acquired by South Korea. North Korean officials were apparently not satisfied with the weapon, and by 1982 they had developed the Type 82 machine gun, which was more directly copied from the PKM's design. This seemed to replace the Type 73 in front-line service, as it was seen in use less since the early-1980s, though it was possibly moved to reserve or militia service. Many were supplied to Iran during the Iran–Iraq War, and some of these have in turn been supplied to Iranian-backed groups engaged in fighting the Islamic State of Iraq and the Levant (ISIL).

Since mid-2015, North Korean or Iranian-built copies of belt-fed Type 73s have been seen in use by Iranian-supported militias like the Popular Mobilization Forces, as well as other factions including the Christian Babylon Brigades that acquired the weapons through their alliance against ISIS. Some were also used by the Sarya Ashoura. By early 2016, they were being used by Syria and by Houthi rebels in Yemen.

In 2017, some Type 73s being covertly shipped to Somalia were seized by the French Navy.

In November 2024, Ukrainian media reported that Russian troops were reported to be using the Type 73. In December 2024, an unknown Russian serviceman criticized the Type 73 due to its weight and iron sights.

== Design ==
The design is heavily based on the 1960s-era Soviet PK machine gun. However, the Type 73 does have certain indigenous modifications, including removable muzzle sleeves and a dual magazine/belt feed system, patterned after the Czechoslovak Vz.52 LMG, allowing the user to fire the weapon from indigenous box magazines or ammunition belts that can be used with the PKM. One unusual feature is a special barrel attachment to enable the gun to fire rifle grenades.

The weapon's intended combat role is thought to be as a squad automatic weapon. However, it uses a 7.62×54mmR cartridge, not the 7.62×39mm round used by the Type 58 assault rifle, North Korea's standard infantry rifle. This is becoming more unusual as many armies have migrated to squad automatic weapons that use the same ammunition as rifles, so all members of a unit may share ammunition and only one type needs to be supplied. A larger cartridge is a characteristic of a general-purpose machine gun, although such weapons typically are belt fed and do not use a box magazine.

Chrome variants are also made; they are usually awarded to North Korean soldiers who excel.

== Users ==
=== Current ===
- Iran
- Iraq: Popular Mobilization Forces
- North Korea
- Russia: Photos posted to Telegram suggest it has supplied by North Korea to Russian Ground Forces.

=== Former ===
- Syria: Syrian Arab Army

=== Non-State Actors ===
- Hezbollah
- Houthis
- Islamic State

== See also ==
- Type 67 machine gun
