= Vz 52 (disambiguation) =

vz 52 or vz. 52 may refer to:

- vz. 52, or CZ 52, Czech semi-automatic pistol
- vz. 52 rifle, Czech self-loading rifle
- Vz. 52 machine gun, Czech light machine gun
