= Vz. 52 machine gun =

vz. 52
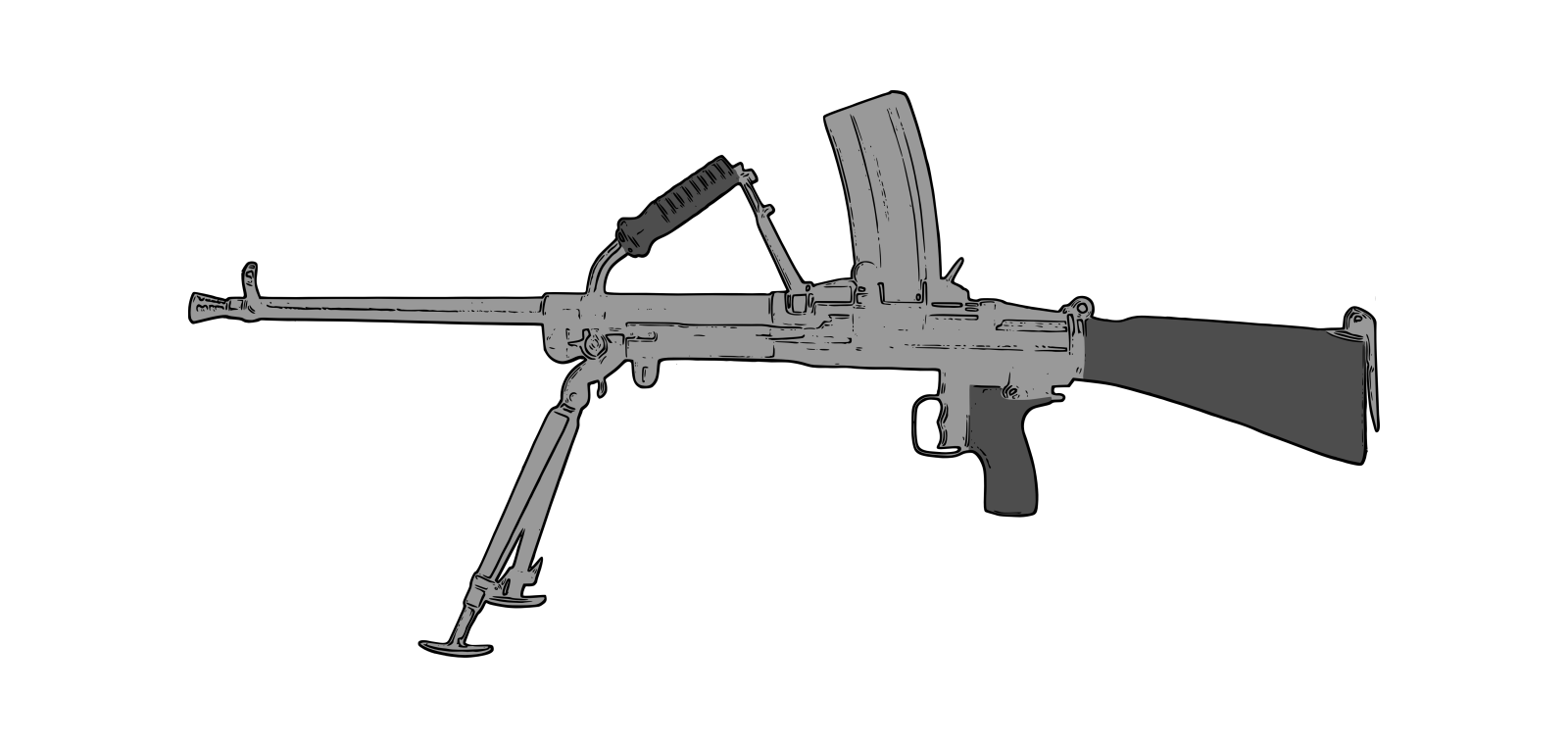
- Type: Light machine gun
- Place of origin: Czechoslovakia

Service history
- In service: 1952–1964
- Used by: See Users
- Wars: Bay of Pigs Invasion; Escambray Rebellion; Nigerian Civil War; Portuguese Colonial War; Ethiopian Civil War; United States invasion of Grenada

Production history
- Designer: Václav Holek
- Designed: 1950s
- Manufacturer: Zbrojovka Brno
- No. built: 8.000
- Variants: vz. 52/57

Specifications
- Mass: 8.0 kg (17.64 lb)
- Length: 1,045 mm (41.1 in)
- Barrel length: 583 mm (23.0 in)
- Cartridge: 7.62×45mm (vz. 52), 7.62×39mm (vz. 52/57)
- Action: Gas-operated, tilting breechblock
- Rate of fire: 900-1150 rounds/min
- Muzzle velocity: 760 m/s
- Effective firing range: 900/800 m
- Maximum firing range: 2800 m
- Feed system: 50-round belt or 25-round detachable box magazine
- Sights: Iron sights

The vz. 52 (7,62mm lehký kulomet vzor 52) is a Czechoslovak light machine gun developed after the Second World War for the Czechoslovak Armed Forces.

== Description ==
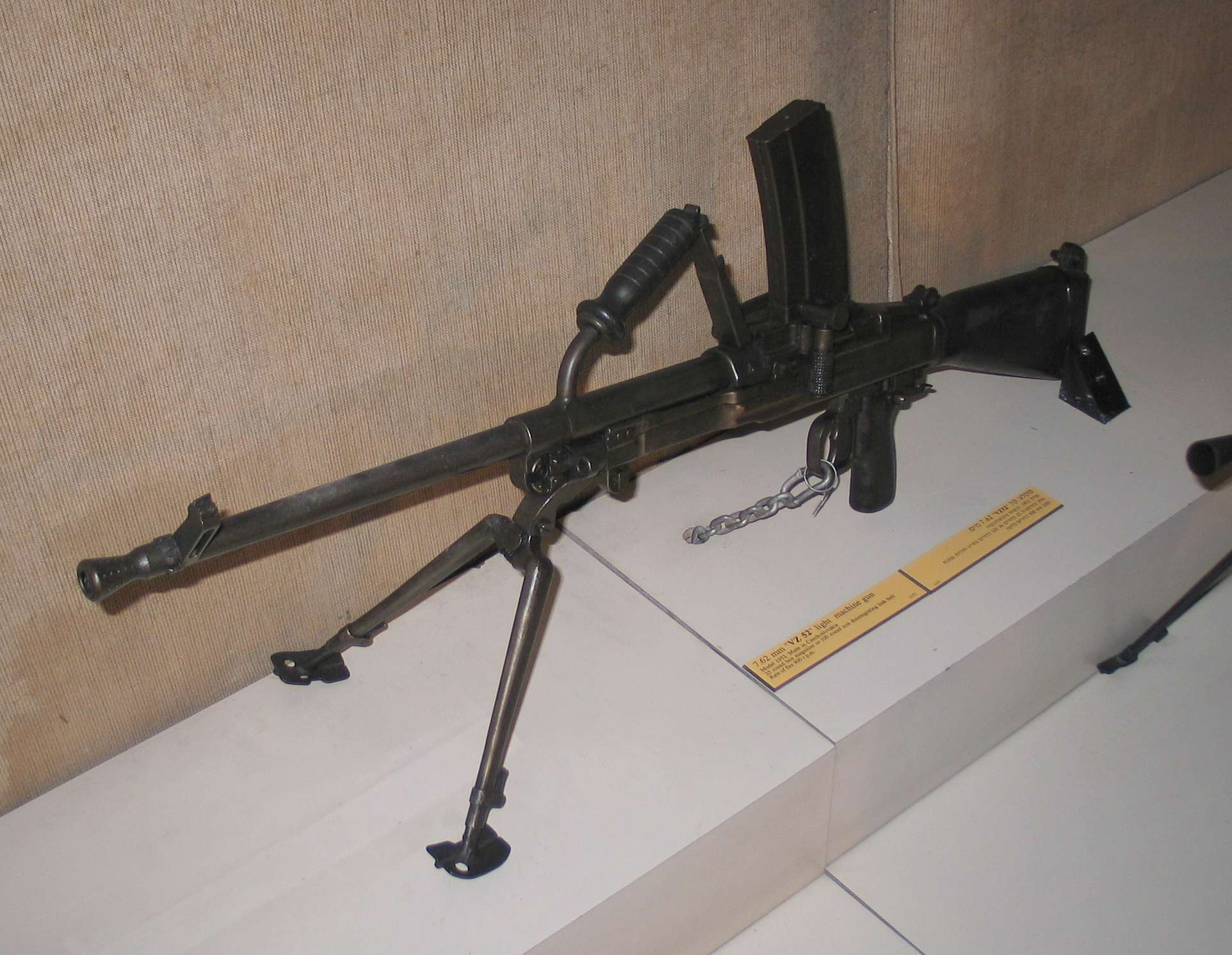
A photo of a bipod-mounted Vz. 52 machine gun on display at the Batey ha-Osef Museum, Tel Aviv, Israel

The vz. 52 was originally called the ZB 501, and was designed by Václav Holek. It is gas-operated and uses a tilting bolt that locks into the roof of the receiver. Its overall action is based on the Czech ZB-26 light machine gun. It has an integral bipod and interchangeable barrels, and its feed system is designed to take metallic belts or box magazines interchangeably and without any modifications. Its compact and light lever-type feeding system was based on the ZB-53 and was later copied in UK vz. 59, PK and Negev.

The vz. 52 initially used the Czech 7.62×45mm vz. 52 cartridge, but in the mid-1950s it was converted to the standard 7.62×39mm Warsaw Pact round by Jaroslav Myslík, and named the vz. 52/57. Both models were replaced in Czech service in 1963–64 by the Universal Machine Gun Model 1959, also known as the Uk vz. 59.

== Users ==
- Algeria
- Angola
- Biafra
- Chad
- Cuba
- Czechoslovakia
- Egypt
- Ethiopia
- Grenada
- Guinea
- Mozambique

== See also ==
=== Weapons of comparable role, configuration and era ===
- RP-46
- URZ AP
- TADEN gun
- Heckler & Koch HK21
- Type 73 light machine gun

== Bibliography ==
- Dubánek, Martin (2008). Československé 7,62 mm lehké kulomety vz. 52 a 52/57. Praha: Naše vojsko. ISBN 978-80-206-0885-7.
- Ezell, Edward Clinton (1988). Small arms today: latest reports on the world's weapons and ammunition (2nd ed.). Harrisburg, PA: Stackpole Books. ISBN 978-0-8117-2280-3.
- Rodríguez, Juan Carlos (2013). The Inevitable Battle: From the Bay of Pigs to Playa Girón. Havana: Editorial Capitan San Luis. ISBN 978-959-211-337-4.
- Willbanks, James H (2004). Machine Guns: An Illustrated History of Their Impact. ABC-CLIO. ISBN 978-1-85109-480-6.

== External sources ==
- http://www.valka.cz/newdesign/v900/clanek_11420.html
- http://www.militaria.wz.cz/cs/kulomet-52.htm
- http://www.historieavojenstvi.cz/2007/clanky/holek.pdf
