= PK machine gun =

Russian general-purpose machine gun and its variants

PK (Pulemyot Kalashnikova)
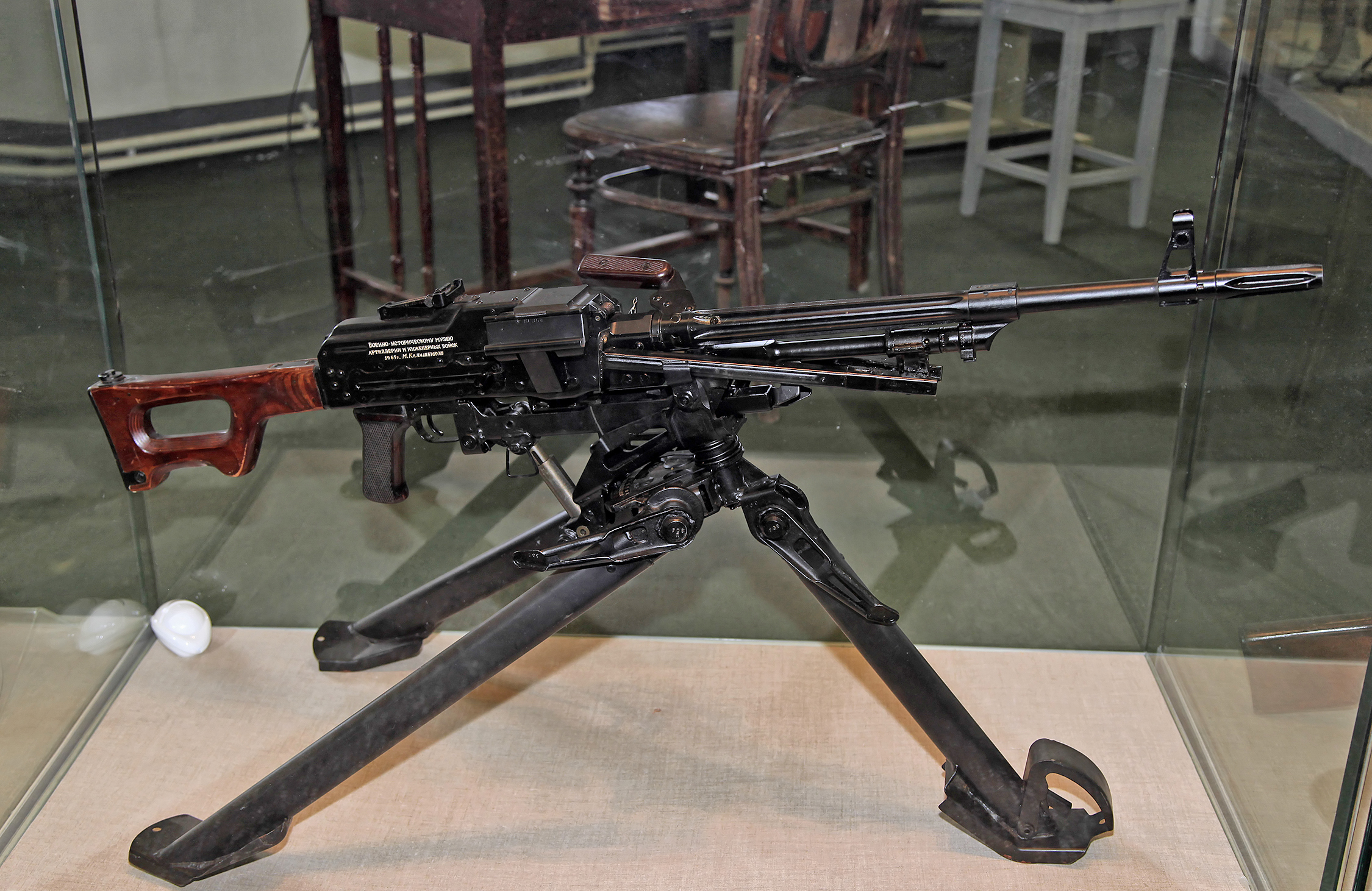
- PKS mounted on a Samozhenkov 6T2 tripod
- Type: General-purpose machine gun Medium machine gun
- Place of origin: Soviet Union

Service history
- In service: 1961–present
- Used by: See Users
- Wars: See Conflicts

Production history
- Designer: Mikhail Kalashnikov
- Designed: 1961
- Manufacturer: Degtyaryov Plant
- Produced: 1961–present
- Variants: See Variants

Specifications
- Mass: 9 kg (19.84 lb) (with integral bipod)
- Length: 1,203 mm (47.4 in)
- Barrel length: 605 mm (23.8 in)
- Cartridge: 7.62×54mmR
- Action: Gas-operated, long-stroke piston, open, rotating bolt
- Rate of fire: 600–800 rounds/min 700–800 rounds/min (PKT/PKTM)
- Muzzle velocity: 825 m/s (2,707 ft/s)
- Effective firing range: 1,000 m (1,094 yd) (100–1,500 m sight adjustments)
- Maximum firing range: 3,800 m (4,156 yd)
- Feed system: Non-disintegrating metal link belts in 100, 200 or 250-round ammunition boxes
- Sights: Tangent iron sights and Warsaw Pact rail for optical, night-vision, thermal, and radar sights

The PK (Russian: Пулемёт Калашникова, romanized: Pulemyot Kalashnikova, lit. 'Kalashnikov's machine gun'), is a belt-fed general-purpose machine gun, chambered for the 7.62×54mmR rimmed cartridge. The modernised variant is known as the PKM, which features several enhancements over the original PK design including a more ergonomic design.

Designed in the Soviet Union and currently in production in Russia, the original PK machine gun was introduced in 1961 and the improved PKM variant was introduced in 1969. The PKM was designed to replace the SGM and RP-46 machine guns that were previously in Soviet service.

The PK remains in use as a front-line infantry and vehicle-mounted machine gun with Russia's armed forces and has also been exported extensively and produced in several other countries under license.

== History ==
The Main Artillery Directorate of the Soviet Union (GRAU) adopted specification requirements for a new 7.62 mm general-purpose company and battalion-level machine gun that was to be chambered for a rifle cartridge in 1955.

In 1958, a machine gun prototype the Nikitin-Sokolov PN1, developed by G.I. Nikitin and Yuri M. Sokolov, successfully passed field tests. Based on the test results, in 1960, it was decided to manufacture a batch of Nikitin-Sokolov machine guns for service tests and then put the machine gun into production at the Kovrov Mechanical Plant. However, the PK had flaws, the main one being that the machine gun did not resist water and snow very well: Water and snow had a tendency to enter the gas piston. If, after firing, water was in the machine gun, then (after two or three shots) the machine gun could only fire shot by shot. After a single shot, the shooter had to reload the machine gun and move the slide manually two or three times. The army therefore asked Nikitin to solve this problem, but the engineer took too long to find a solution. In order to force Nikitin to work faster, the Main Artillery and Missile Directorate decided in 1958 to restart the competition. A team of Izhevsk Mechanical Plant designers, headed by M.T. Kalashnikov, and further consisting of V.V. Krupin, V.N. Pushchin, A.D. Kryakushin, as well as Startsev, Kamzolov, Koryakovtsev, Yuferev, joined the competition. Kalashnikov and his team accepted the task despite at the same time working on the design of the AKM and the RPK and the fact that Nikitin's PN1 had already been chosen by the army and that the latter was supported by certain ministries and senior officers. Their machine gun prototype was based on the well-proven gas-operated rotary-bolt design of the Kalashnikov-pattern arms.

The Kalashnikov and the Nikitin-Sokolov prototypes underwent service tests in the Central Asian, Odessa, and Baltic Military Districts, as well as at the Vystrel officer training courses in late 1960. The Main Missiles and Artillery Directorate and the Ministry of the Defence Industry preferred the Kalashnikov design. The PK could resist water perfectly, but it was also much easier to maintain and manufacture, because it reused the same ammunition bands as the Maxim or SG-43, while the PN1 used a new type of bands which was not yet in production at the time. Furthermore, according to Kalashnikov, its competitors attempted to bias the test by asking operators to lower the rate of fire because of overlapping bands during long bursts. There was also another incident during the test, according to Kalashnikov, the recoil of the PN1 was poorly distributed and a large part ended up in the stock; the pressure was so great that one of the soldiers responsible for testing the PN1 broke his cheekbone.

Based on the test results, the army preferred the Kalashnikov design. In 1961, the 7.62x54R mm Kalashnikov universal machine gun was adopted and put into production. The production of the PK/PKS took place at the Kovrov Mechanical Plant and used the tripod mount and an ammunition belt boxes originally designed for the Nikitin-Sokolov prototype machine gun.

Nikitin's and Sokolov's machine gun design was later used in the 12.7 mm NSV heavy machine gun that was put into production in 1971.

In June 2024, it is reported that the PKZ will eventually replace the PKM in Russian military service.

=== Production ===
The PKM and other variants are in production in Russia and are currently exported to many other nations. Additionally, various models are manufactured locally around the globe. A remotely controlled PKT version reportedly entered service in November 2023. Zastava Arms produces the PK under license as the M84 (along with the PKT as the M86), and it remains in use with many of the former Yugoslav successor states. The most recent modification is the Russian PKP Pecheneg, which features a forced air cooling barrel and longer barrel life up to 10,000 rounds.

== Design details ==
The original PK was a development of Kalashnikov's AKM assault rifle and the accompanying RPK light machine gun design that featured stamped receivers. The PK uses the 7.62×54mmR Eastern Bloc standard cartridge that produces significantly more bolt thrust when compared to the Eastern Bloc 7.62×39mm and 5.45×39mm intermediate cartridges.

With the use of a single spare parts kit and two barrel assemblies the service life of the modernised PKM machine gun series is guaranteed for at least 25,000 rounds.

=== Operating mechanism ===
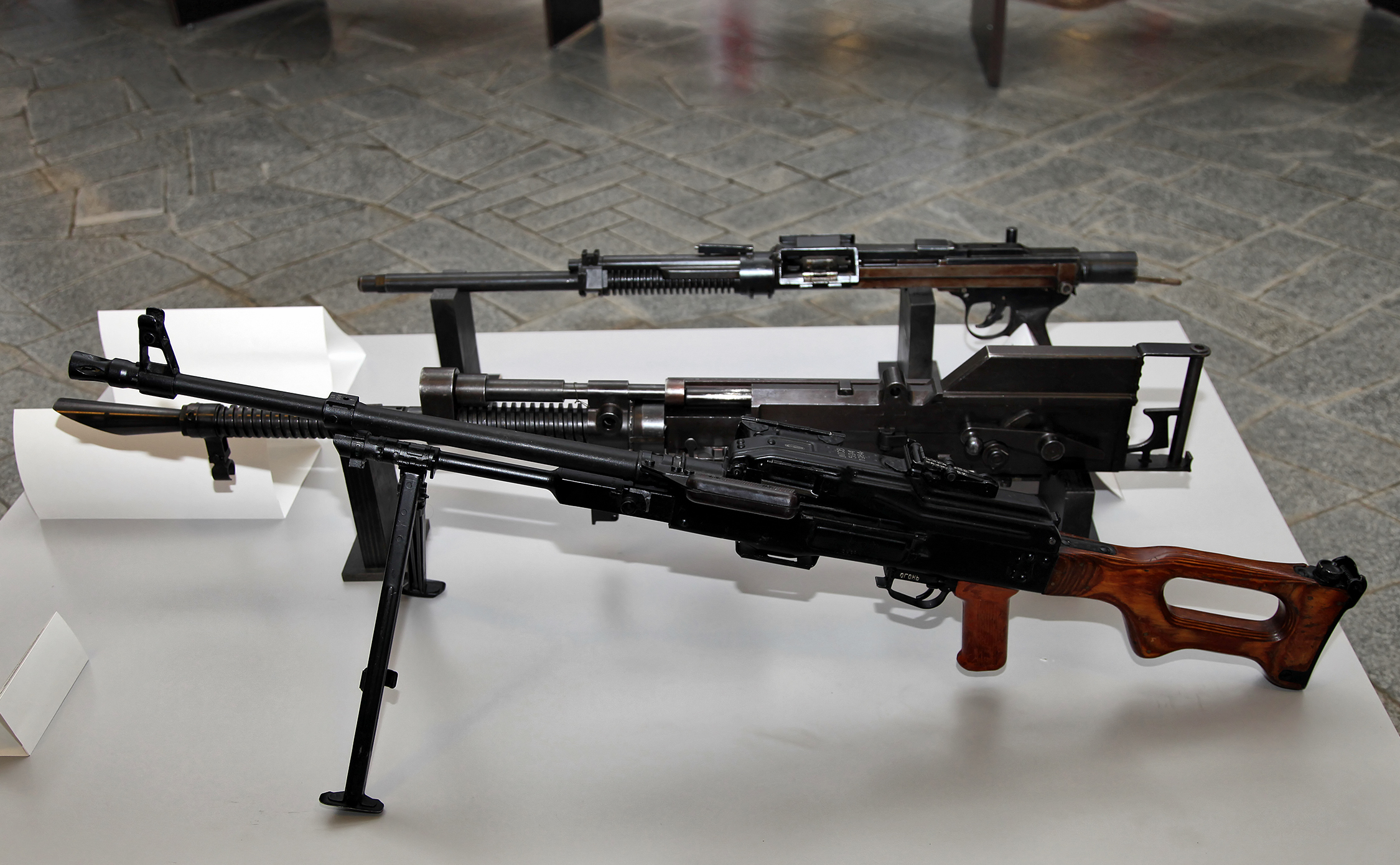
Front to back: PK prototype, model of Shpitalniy tank machine gun prototype, TKB-264

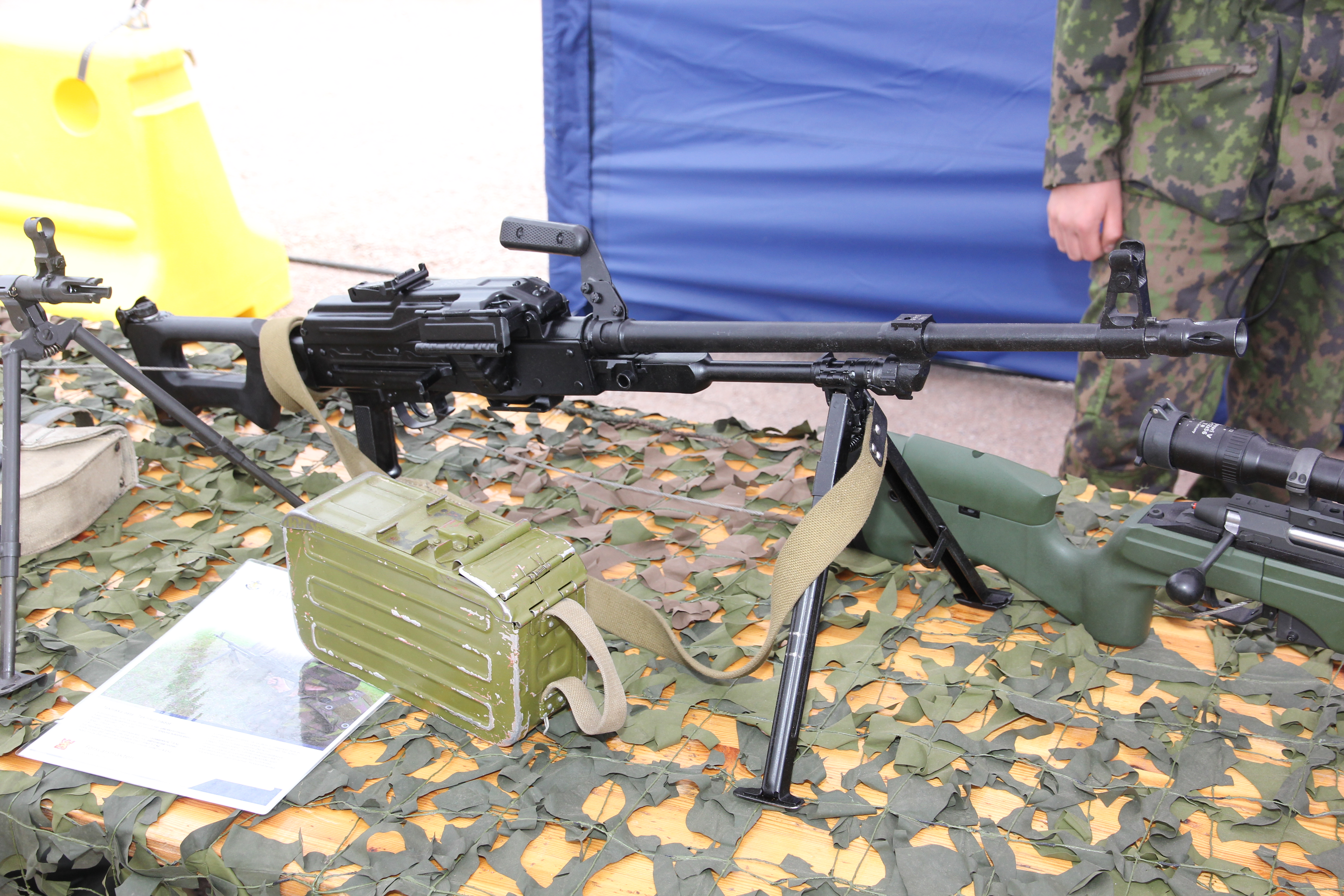
PK general-purpose machine gun with modern black polymer furniture and a 100-round ammunition box. Note the non-fluted barrel and revised flash hider.

The bolt and carrier design are similar to the AK-47 and other modernised Kalashnikov-pattern designs, as is the stripping procedure performed to remove those mechanisms from the gun for cleaning. The bolt and bolt carrier are however oriented upside down compared to the AKM, with the piston and gas system being underneath the barrel.

Unlike the AKM and RPK, the PK machine gun series is an open bolt design, which improves heat management during automatic fire compared to closed bolt designs and helps avoiding the dangerous phenomenon known as "cook-off", wherein the firing chamber becomes so hot that the propellant contained in a chambered round unintentionally ignites, making the machine gun fire until the ammunition is exhausted. Open bolt designs typically operate much cooler than closed bolt designs due to the airflow allowed into the chamber, action and barrel during pauses between bursts, making them more suitable for constant fully automatic fire. Further, general-purpose machine guns like the PK are normally issued with several quick change barrels that, during prolonged intense use, are swapped out allowing one barrel to cool while the machine gun fires with the other.

The rimmed 7.62×54mmR cartridges are set in a metal ammunition belt and are held against the shoulder inside non disintegrating looped links, leaving the rim exposed at the rear. The belt is mounted from the right side into the feed way of the PK machine gun. The machine gun uses a non-reciprocating charging handle on the right side of the receiver to charge the gun. Since the PK uses a rimmed rifle cartridge and closed-link belts used for feeding, a two-stage feed mechanism with a preliminary extraction of a cartridge from a belt link was preferred over a direct ammunition feed design often used for rimless cartridges.

The PK machine gun is equipped with a lever-type feed mechanism introduced in Louis Stange's MG 39 Rh and copied in the Czechoslovak machine guns like vz. 52 and vz. 59, which is operated by the feed lever. The lever, which is simplified compared to the prior art, is mounted on the right wall of the receiver and wraps around the bolt carrier with its feed pawl and roller. The rest of the mechanism is mounted either on the receiver cover or on the ammunition feed tray cover hinged under it. The PK feed mechanism pulls the rimmed 7.62×54mmR cartridges out from the back of the ammunition belt and drops the cartridges down into the feed way, allowing the bolt to strip and feed the cartridges into the chamber for firing.

The PK feed mechanism is radically different from that of 7.62×51mm NATO machine guns based on the MG 42 feed mechanism that typically incorporate a much larger (and therefore much heavier) articulated feed cam, lever, and pawl assembly that pushes rimless cartridges out forward from their links directly into the chamber for firing.

The PK fires from the rear sear. The breech is locked by a rotating bolt, with two locking lugs engaging locking recesses in the receiver. The gas piston is hinged to the bolt carrier assembly, and its vertical travel makes it possible to bend the group making machine gun assembly and disassembly for maintenance easier. The protruding rear part of the bolt carrier assembly features spiral shaped cuts, which provide a controlled rotation of the bolt. The mainspring is accommodated in the bolt carrier assembly slide channel. A cartridge extractor with a latch is mounted in the rear part of the bolt carrier assembly. The cocking lever, mounted on the right, is not integral with the bolt carrier and does not reciprocate as the gun fires.

The gas cylinder is mounted under the barrel and fitted with a gas regulator with three fixed positions. The gas regulator opens corresponding holes to change the amount of expanding propellant gases bled off out of the gas cylinder into the atmosphere, thus varying the amount of energy transferred on to the long-stroke piston.

=== Receiver ===
The PK general-purpose machine gun U-shaped receiver is stamped from a smooth 1.5 mm (0.06 in) sheet of steel that is supported extensively by pins and rivets. For additional rigidity and strength, the PK receiver features double walls made from 1.5 mm steel plates that are welded together with the U-shaped stamping. The receiver top cover is also stamped from 1.5 mm sheet metal and hinged on the front of the receiver and locked at the back with a spring-loaded latch.

=== Barrel ===
The quick detachable barrel assembly slides into the receiver and attaches by a barrel-lock. On the original PK it was partially fluted to increase rigidity and improve heat dissipation. The barrel-lock also regulates the gap between the breech face and the breech end of the barrel. PK barrels have a folding carry handle/grip that is positioned to the left of the receiver and is used to transport the machine gun and quickly and safely change-out barrels to prevent barrel overheating. The bore is chrome-lined and features four right-hand grooves at a 240 mm (1 in 9.45 in) rifling twist rate. The muzzle is threaded for the installation of various muzzle devices such as a flash hider. The muzzle was normally equipped with a conical flash suppressor that added 53 mm (2.1 in) to the barrel and later a long slotted flash suppressor that added 72 mm (2.8 in) to the barrel. Later when the PKM variant was introduced the PK series barrel fluting was omitted and the muzzle device was changed to a shorter cylindrical slotted flash suppressor that added 40 mm (1.6 in) to the barrel. The PKM barrel assembly weighs 2.4 kg (5.3 lb) and can fire up to 400 rounds in rapid fire scenarios before it has to be replaced for another barrel or allowed to cool down to prevent unacceptable wear of the bore. The sustainable effective rate of fire is about 250 rounds per minute. Whilst, the cyclic rate of fire is around 600–800 rounds per minute.

=== Sights ===
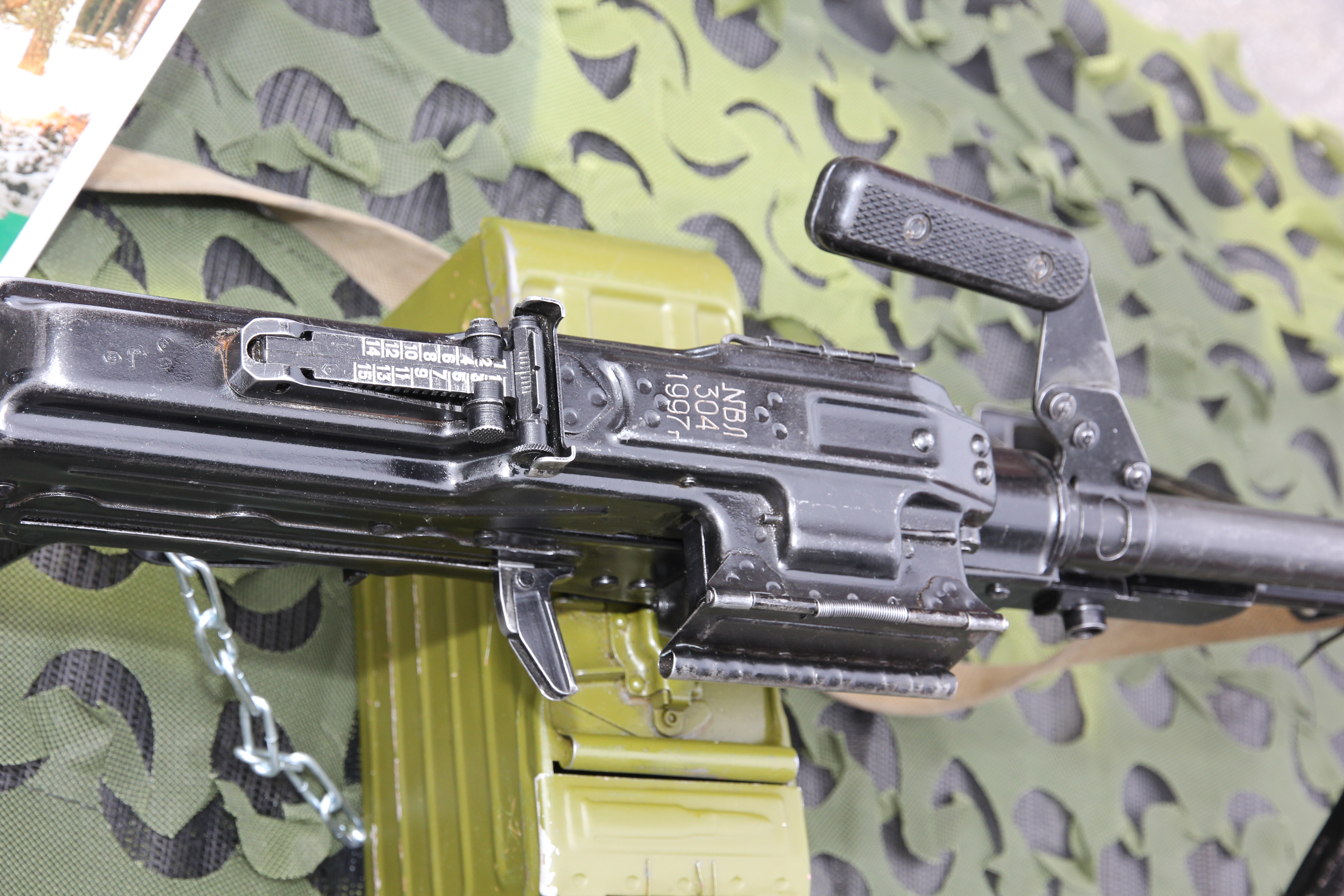
Rear iron sight element on a PKM receiver

==== Iron sights ====
The rear sight assembly is riveted onto the receiver cover and consist of a square notched rear tangent iron sight calibrated in 100 m (109 yd) increments from 100 to 1,500 m (109 to 1,640 yd) and includes a "point-blank range" battle zero setting corresponding to a 330 m (361 yd) zero. It is identical in design to the AKM and Mosin–Nagant, except that it is oriented backwards with the notch forward and the hinge behind. The iron sight line has a 663 mm (26.1 in) sight radius. Like the RPD rear sight, the PK rear sight also features full windage adjustment in the form of small dials on either side of the notch.

The front sight assembly is mounted near the end of the barrel and consists of a protected open post adjustable for elevation in the field.

==== Optical sights ====
PK machine guns that feature a Warsaw Pact side-rail bracket on the left side of the receiver can mount various aiming optics. The standard Russian side rail mounted optical sight was the 4×26 1P29 Universal sight for small arms, an aiming optic similar to the British SUIT and SUSAT and Canadian C79 optical sights. When mounted, the 1P29 sight is positioned centered above the receiver at a height that allows the use of the iron sights. It weighs 0.8 kg, offers 4× magnification with a field of view of 8° and 35 mm eye relief. The 1P29 is issued with a canvas pouch, a lens cleaning cloth, combination tool, two rubber eyecups, two eyecup clamps and three different bullet drop compensation (BDC) cams for the AK-74, RPK-74 and PK machine gun. The 1P29 is intended for quickly engaging point and area targets at various ranges. On the right side of the field of view a stadiametric rangefinder is incorporated that can be used to determine the distance from a 1.5 meters (4 ft 11.1 in) tall object from 400 to 1,200 m (437 to 1,312 yd). The reticle is an inverted aiming post in the top half of the field of view and is tritium-illuminated for low-light condition aiming. A later designed similar optical sight suitable for the PK machine gun series is the 4×24 1Р77.

=== Trigger ===
The trigger assembly, mounted inside the receiver, is operated by the mainspring and suitable for automatic fire. It has no single shot mode of fire. The manual rotating type safety locks the sear, which engages the sear notch of the bolt carrier assembly, and the trigger lug does not allow the bolt carrier assembly to go all the way back.

=== Stock ===
The skeletonised buttstock, pistol grip and folding carry handle/grip on the barrels were originally manufactured from birch plywood laminates. Such engineered woods are stronger and resist warping better than the conventional one-piece patterns, do not require lengthy maturing, and are cheaper. The wooden furniture was finished with the Russian amber shellac finishing process. Small accessories and an oil-solvent container can be stored inside butt recesses. Later the buttstock was fitted with a hinged butt-rest. More recent PKM machine guns and barrel assemblies are equipped with a new black glass-filled polyamide buttstock, pistol grip and barrel carry handle/grip shaped like the previously used laminated wooden stock and grips.

=== Feeding ===
Non-disintegrating metal 7.62×54mmR ammunition belt used by the PK machine gun

PK machine guns are belt-fed, using non-disintegrating metal belts, which have links that wrap around the cartridge case shoulder all the way around, and are linked by a coiling wire on each side. The links are made of 0.8 mm (0.03 in) thick high carbon stamped steel sheet metal that is zinc phosphated and varnished for protection. These belts are preloaded at ammunition factories in 25-round connectable belt lengths and can be linked to any length necessary. Factory connected PK ammunition belts are available in 25, 100, 200 and 250 rounds lengths. Typical of Soviet machine guns, the PK feeds from the right and ejects its spent cases via an ejection port on the left side of the machine gun, contrary to the right side ejection port seen in most Western machine guns.

For the light machine gun role, the PK is used as the standard squad automatic weapon of the Russian Army. The PK uses a 100-round non-disintegrating belt contained in a metal box made from an aluminium frame and steel cover that can be attached under the gun's receiver. The 100-round belt "assault" box has a folding lid in its cover for feeding the ammunition belt when the box is attached under the machine gun receiver and weighs 3.9 kg (8.60 lb) or 3.4 kg (7.50 lb) for the modernised all aluminium lightweight variant. When the machine gun is fired from a bipod, the 100-round ammunition box is normally attached to the underside of the receiver.

For the medium machine gun role, there is also a 200/250-round ammunition box made from an aluminium frame and steel cover available which can be mounted on the tripods used for the PK machine gun series. A 200/250-round ammunition box containing a 250-round non-disintegrating belt weighs 9.4 kg (20.72 lb) and containing a 200-round non-disintegrating belt weighs 8 kg (17.64 lb) or 6.2 kg (13.67 lb) for the modernised all aluminium lightweight variant. Both metal ammunition boxes have canvas carry handles.

All openings on the machine gun, particularly the ejector port on the left and the belt feed entrance on the right, are covered with spring-loaded dust covers so that the openings are only exposed when they need to be.

=== Accessories ===
The PK is equipped with a simple detachable bipod mounted to the gas cylinder beneath the barrel and in that light machine gun setup is used as a squad-level support weapon. The right bipod leg accommodates links of a cleaning rod. Other accessories include a sling and storage covers.

The PK machine gun is also suitable for installation on tripod mounts or vehicle mounted medium machine gun setups and can also be used as a light anti-aircraft weapon against slow flying aircraft when it is put on an AA mount.

As with all general-purpose machine guns, tripod and vehicle mountings offer a higher degree of accuracy and control than when used on a less stable bipod. The PK machine gun, firing short bursts from a bipod, as a light machine gun has the following accuracy of fire: a mean deviation of 7–10 cm (2.8–3.9 in) at a range of 100 m (109 yd), 37–51 cm (15–20 in) at 500 m (547 yd), and 71–103 cm (28–41 in) at 1,000 m (1,094 yd). The Russian and other European militaries use a circular error probable method that assumes a 50% hit probability (R_{50}).

== Variants ==
=== PK ===
For heavier employment, the PK (ПК Станковый: "PK Mounted") is based on the Samozhenkov 6T2 tripod mount. The PK and 6T2 tripod weigh 16.5 kg (36.38 lb).

The 6T2 Samozhenkov general-purpose tripod mount was designed by E. S. Samozhenkov and entered service in 1961 and weighs 7.5 kg (16.53 lb). The 6T2 Samozhenkov tripod mount was earlier envisioned for the Nikitin-Sokoiov machine gun that was not adopted by the Soviet Union. All types of ammunition belt boxes are carried and mounted separately. The Rakov device is used for loading ammunition belts. The PK machine gun is attached to a cradle on the 6T2 Samozhenkov mount. The cradle is hinged to a plug-in swivel equipped with a rack-and-pinion traversing mechanism, and a rod-and-screw elevation mechanism. The traversing mechanism is fitted with stops to limit the field of fire. For anti-aircraft fire or fire against ground targets from a kneeling position the cradle mounts a collapsible pole with a pivoting bracket. The mount features non-digging-in spades — sliding spades affect the accuracy of fire less than a "jumping" tripod with dug-in spades. There is an extra folding spade on the front leg for slippery and moving ground. Hinged tripod legs allow a gunner to fire the machine gun from a prone, a sitting, or a kneeling position.

The PK machine gun, firing bursts from its tripod with fixed traversing and elevation mechanisms, as a medium machine gun has the following accuracy of fire: mean deviation of 5–6 cm (2.0–2.4 in) at a range of 100 m (109 yd), 25–29 cm (9.8–11.4 in) cm at 500 m (547 yd), and 49–68 cm (19–27 in) at 1,000 m (1,094 yd). The Russian and other European militaries use a circular error probable method that assumes a 50% hit probability (R_{50}) and cannot be converted and is not comparable to US military methods for determining small arms accuracy. When the R_{50} results are doubled the hit probability increases to 93.7%.

=== PKB ===
The PKB is a variant of the PK that has been designed for use as a pintle mounted machine gun on combat vehicles. A swivel has been attached to the middle of the PKB. Another configuration of the PKB has the normal stock and trigger mechanism removed and replaced by twin spade grips and a butterfly trigger.

=== PKT ===
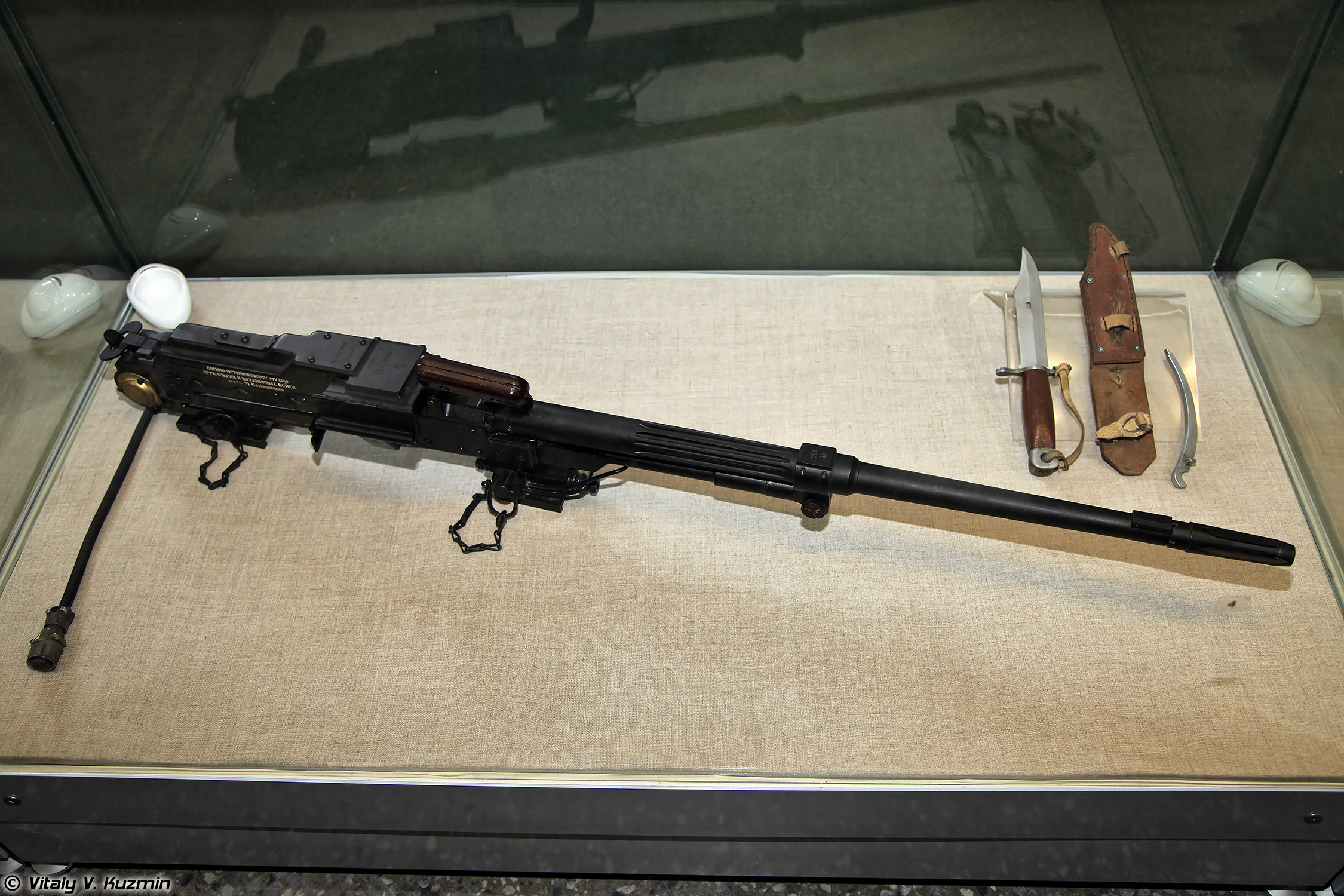
PK solenoid-fired coaxial version with its longer and heavier barrel assembly

The 'PK'T (ПК Танковый, "PK Tank") (1968) is a solenoid-fired coaxial version of PK to replace the SGMT Goryunov vehicle-mounted machine gun. Modifications include the removal of the stock, a longer (722 mm (28.4 in)) and heavier barrel that adds 30 m/s (98 ft/s) muzzle velocity, a gas regulator and an electric solenoid trigger. The PK minimum cyclic rate of fire is 100 rounds per minute higher than other PK-series variants and is usually fed from 250-round ammunition boxes. The PKT barrel assembly weighs 3.23 kg (7.1 lb) and can fire up to 500 rounds in rapid fire scenarios before it has to be replaced for another barrel or allowed to cool down to prevent unacceptable wear of the bore. Some PKs have been converted to infantry machine guns.

=== PKM ===
The PKM (ПК Модернизированный: "Kalashnikov's machine-gun modernised"), was adopted into service in 1969. The PKM is a modernised, product-improved version of the PK. The upgrades are primarily aimed at reducing the weight, simplifying production, and facilitating easier operation. The receiver cover became more rigid due to lengthwise ribs. The butt was fitted with a hinged butt-rest. The barrel fluting was omitted and the flash hider was changed. Later, the PKM was equipped with a new black glass-filled polyamide buttstock and pistol grip shaped like the previously used laminated wooden stock and grip.

==== PKMN ====
The PKMN (ПКМ Ночной: "PKM Night-Vision") is a variant that can mount a night sight for low-visibility operations. The PKMN-1 can thus mount the multi-model NSPU-3 (1PN51) night vision scope while the PKMN-2 can mount the multi-model NSPUM (1PN58) night vision scope. It can also be fitted with the 1PN93 series passive night sights.

Besides the Shakhin and 1PN116 thermal sights and the 1PN119 anti-sniper special-purpose night vision sight are available for mounting on PK machine guns that like the PKMN model feature a Warsaw Pact side-rail bracket on the left side of the receiver for mounting aiming optics.

==== PKMS ====
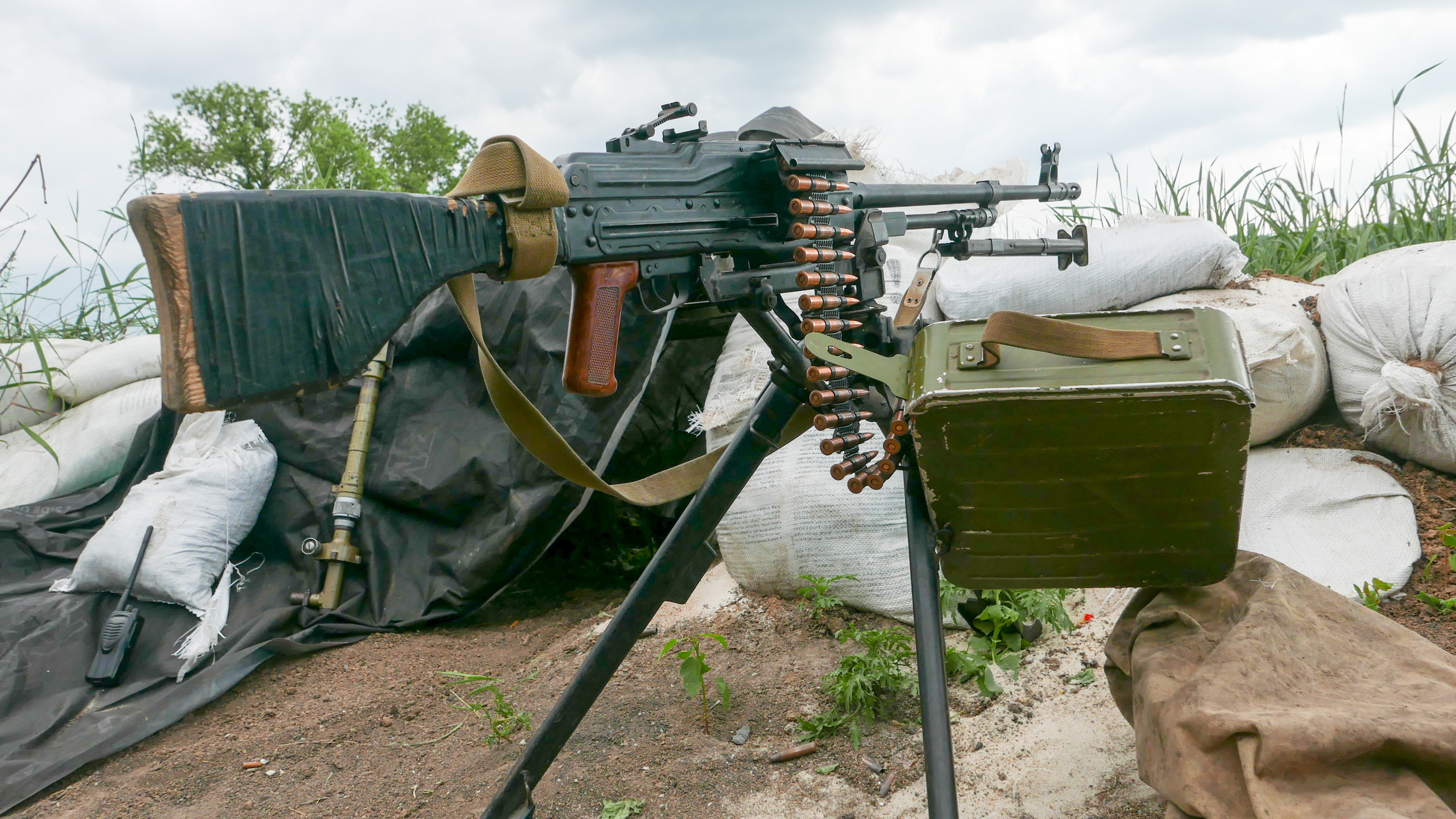
PKMS (PK mounted on a Stepanov 6T5 tripod mount). Notice the ammunition belt box secured to the right rear tripod leg and buttstock field repair

For heavier employment, the PKMS (ПКМ Станковый: "PKM Mounted") is mounted on the Stepanov 6T5 tripod mount. The PKM and 6T5 tripod weigh 12 kg (26.46 lb).

The tripod mount, designed by L. V. Stepanov for the PKM machine gun, entered service in 1969. The Stepanov tripod mount is almost entirely made from stamped steel and weighs 4.5 kg (9.92 lb). It is lighter and has 20 fewer components than the preceding Samozhenkov tripod; its production is 40% less labour-intensive; and its design does not reduce the accuracy of fire compared to the Samozhenkov tripod. The Stepanov mount is based on a principle of multi-functional components: the elevation mechanism frame is also used as a pole for kneeled shooting or anti-aircraft fire; the base sleeve also serves as the axis for attaching rear legs of the tripod; the machine gun attachment is combined with the elevation mechanism frame lock for anti-aircraft fire; the fine elevation adjustment mechanism is integrated with the elevation mechanism axis. Each tripod leg can be folded for transport or adjusted for proper height on uneven terrain. The ammunition belt box can be secured to the right rear tripod leg in such a manner that the gun can be moved with the ammunition box still in place and with the gun loaded. This enables one crew member to carry and operate the gun in combat without having to unload the gun before repositioning.

==== PKMSN ====
The PKMSN (ПКМС Ночной: "PKMS Night-Vision") is a special model of the tripod-mounted variant (PKMS) that can mount night sights for low-visibility operations, similar to the PKMN.

The PKMSN variant can use NSPU-3 (1PN51) and NSPUM (1PN58) night sights. It can also be fitted with the 1PN93 series passive night sights.

Besides that Shakhin and 1PN116 thermal sights and the 1PN119 anti-sniper special-purpose night vision sight are available for mounting on PK machine guns that like the PKMSN model feature a Warsaw Pact side-rail bracket on the left side of the receiver for mounting aiming optics.

==== PKTM ====
Modernised version of the PKT.

==== PKBM ====
Modernised version of the PKB.

=== PKP Pecheneg ===
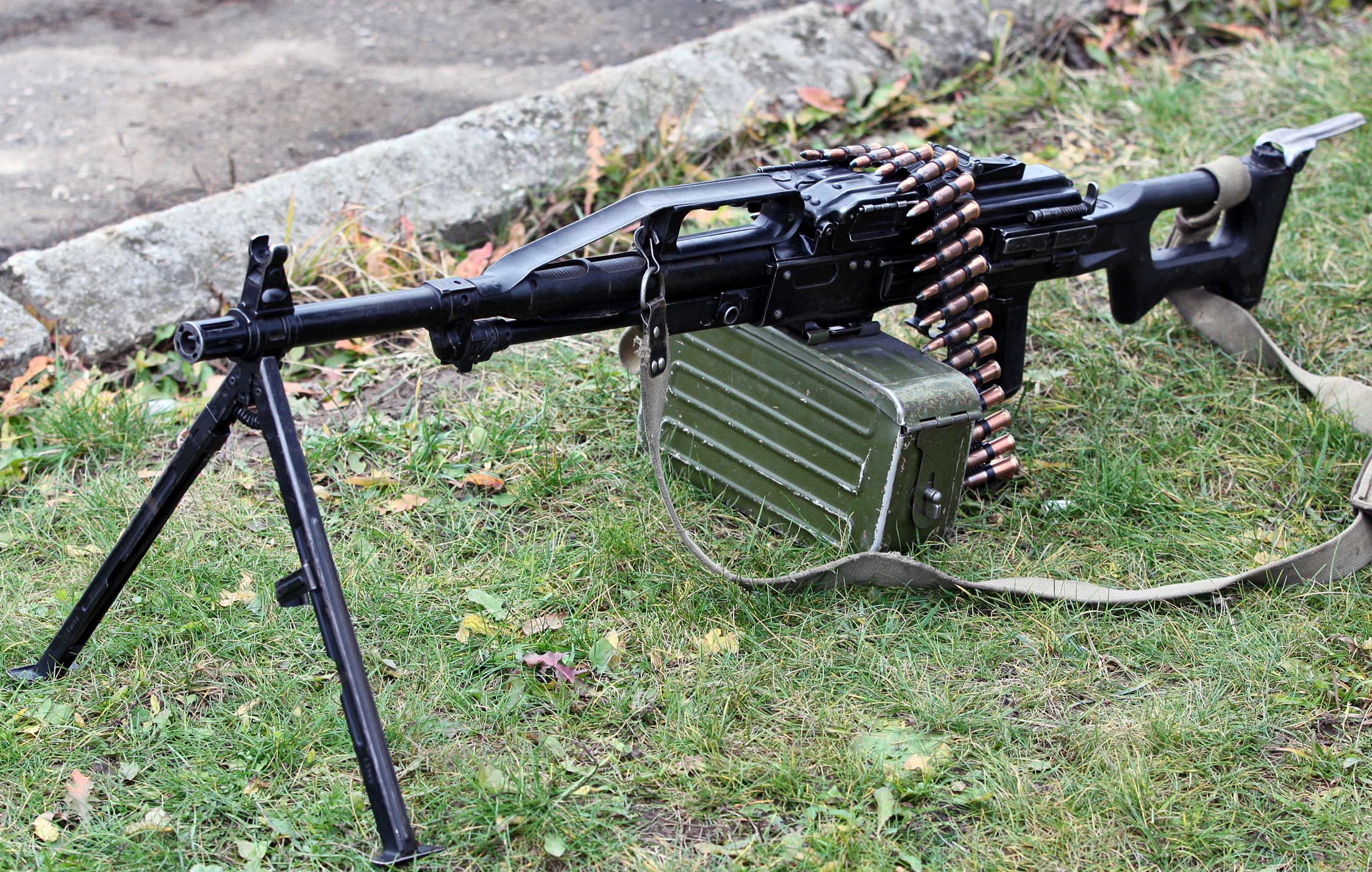
PKP Pecheneg with a 100-round ammunition box

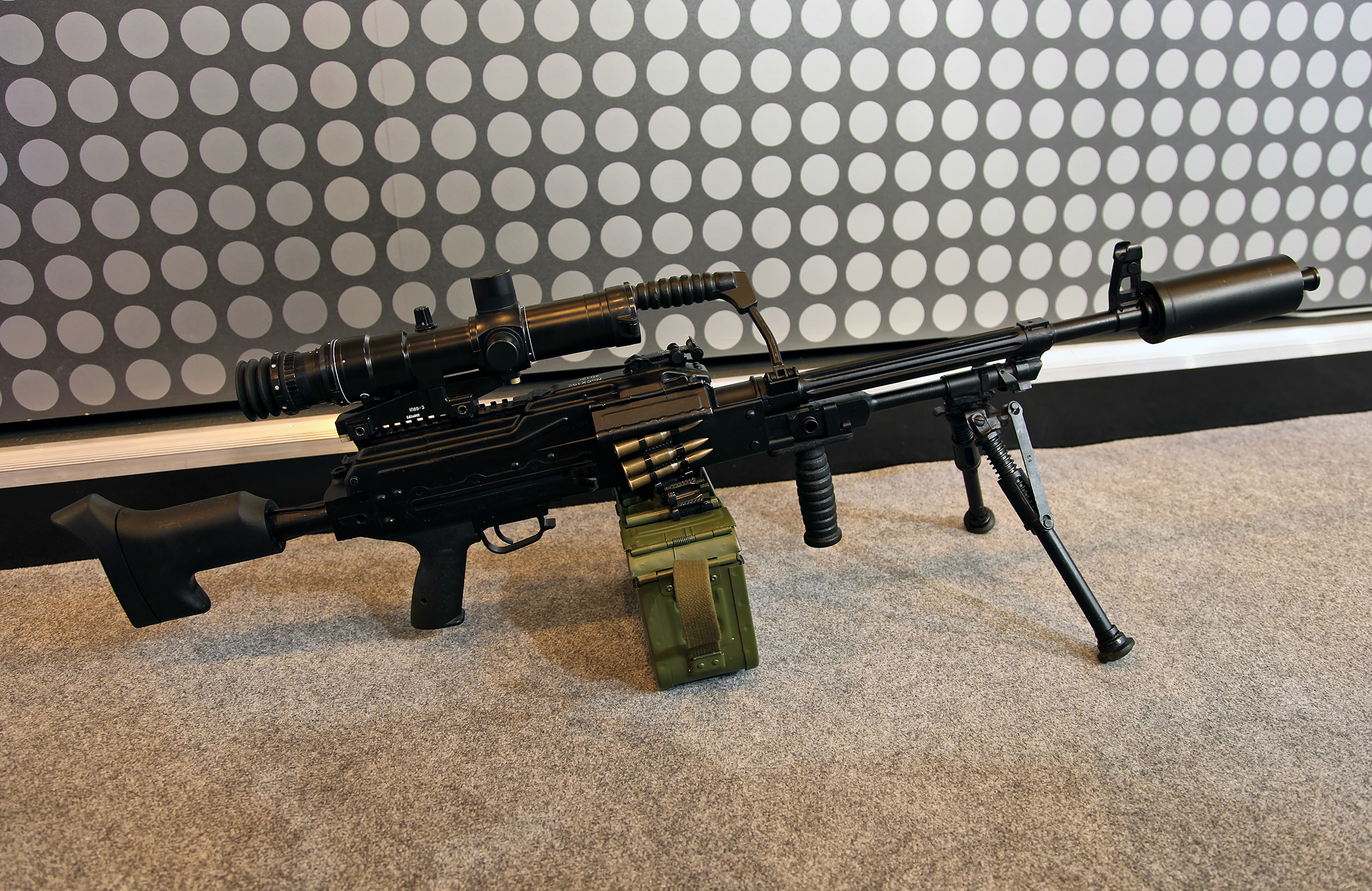
PKP Pecheneg-SP with a telescopic sight and suppressor

- The PKP Pecheneg (6P41) is a further development and modification of the PKM unveiled in 2001. It has a heavy fixed barrel encased in a radial cooling sleeve that uses forced-air cooling, much like the Lewis Gun of the First World War.
- PKP Pecheneg-NP (6P41N) is a variant with a Warsaw Pact rail for mounting nightscopes.
- PKP Pecheneg-SP (6P69) is an improved and modernised variant.

=== Foreign copies ===
==== HCP PKM-NATO prototype and UKM-2000 (Poland) ====
In the early 1990s, as part of the preparations to join NATO, the Polish armed forces were looking for a replacement for the PK-series machine guns then in service. The H. Cegielski - Poznań S.A. Works in Poznań modified the PK/PKS to feed standard 7.62×51mm NATO cartridges and use NATO standard ammunition belts. The new model received the code-name PK-NATO (or PK-N). The modifications included a heavier barrel, a larger chamber, and a redesign of the lock, bolt, extractor, and the entire feeding mechanism. The prototype was tested from 1997 to 1999, but was rejected.

Instead, the Polish Army adopted the UKM-2000 machine gun in 2007, which was also based on the PK.

==== Zastava M84/M86/M09/M10 (Yugoslavia/Serbia) ====
The Zastava M84 is a Yugoslav/Serbian-made licensed copy of the PK/PKS. The Zastava M86 is a copy of the solenoid-triggered PKT. These variants can be easily recognised by their unhollowed stock.

The Zastava M09 is a copy of the PKM with black synthetic furniture, chambered in 5.56x45 NATO ammo. The Zastava M10 is a variant of the M09 with a solid stock.

==== Norinco Type 80 (People's Republic of China) ====
The Type 80 is a Chinese-made copy of the PKM/PKMS.

The 7.62×51mm NATO variant CS/LM4 is also available for export.

==== Arsenal MG, MG-M1, MG-M1S, MG-1M, MG-M2, and MG-M2S (Bulgaria) ====
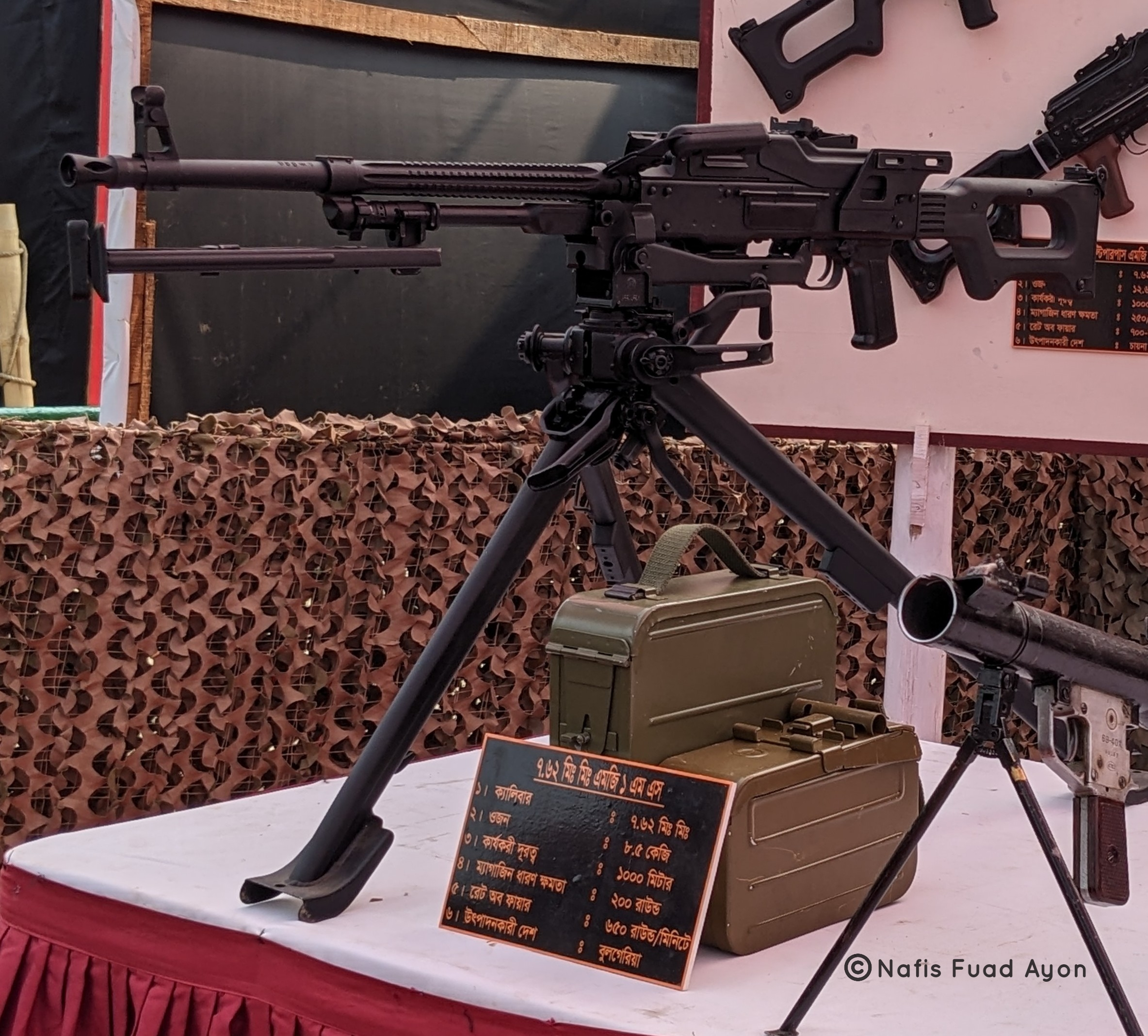
Bangladesh Army Arsenal MG-1MS machine gun on display at military hardware exhibition 2024 in Dhaka

Arsenal originally produced the MG, modeled after the original Russian PK model. The MG-M1 is a licensed copy of the PKM with a synthetic buttstock and pistol grip. The MG-M1S only differs from the MG-M1 model due to the use of a tripod by the M1S model, where as the M1 model uses the original bi-pod design.

The MG-1M, an improved Squad Automatic Weapon variant, has improved features, such as a redesigned barrel that allows for better cooling. The MG-M2 and MG-M2S are the M1 and M1S model that were chambered in 7.62×51mm NATO.

In 2023, a group of Ukrainian volunteers purchased 1,460 PKMs from Bulgaria for a value of 6.75 million €, or a little more than €4,500 per machine gun.

==== Cugir Mitraliera md. 66 (Romania) ====
The Mitraliera md. 66 is a Romanian-made copy of the PKM.

==== Z111 ĐL7N and STrL-P (Vietnam) ====
The ĐL7N is a copy of the PKMS, made with added picatinny rails, replacing the wooden stock with black synthetic stock, and a new Galil-style grip.

The StrL-P, a more modernized variant based on the PKP, was unveiled for the first time at the Exhibition of 80 Years of National Achievements at the Vietnam Exposition Center in Hanoi on 28 August 2025. It incorporates a heavy barrel with a dual cooling system, ensuring sustained accuracy, durability, and service life.

==== Mayak KM-7.62, KT-7.62 and KTM-7.62 (Ukraine) ====
The Mayak KM-7.62 is a copy of the PKM, made to be lighter and easier to handle. It first appeared in 2011. The KT-7.62 and KTM-7.62 are copies of the PKT, first appearing in 2011.

== Users ==
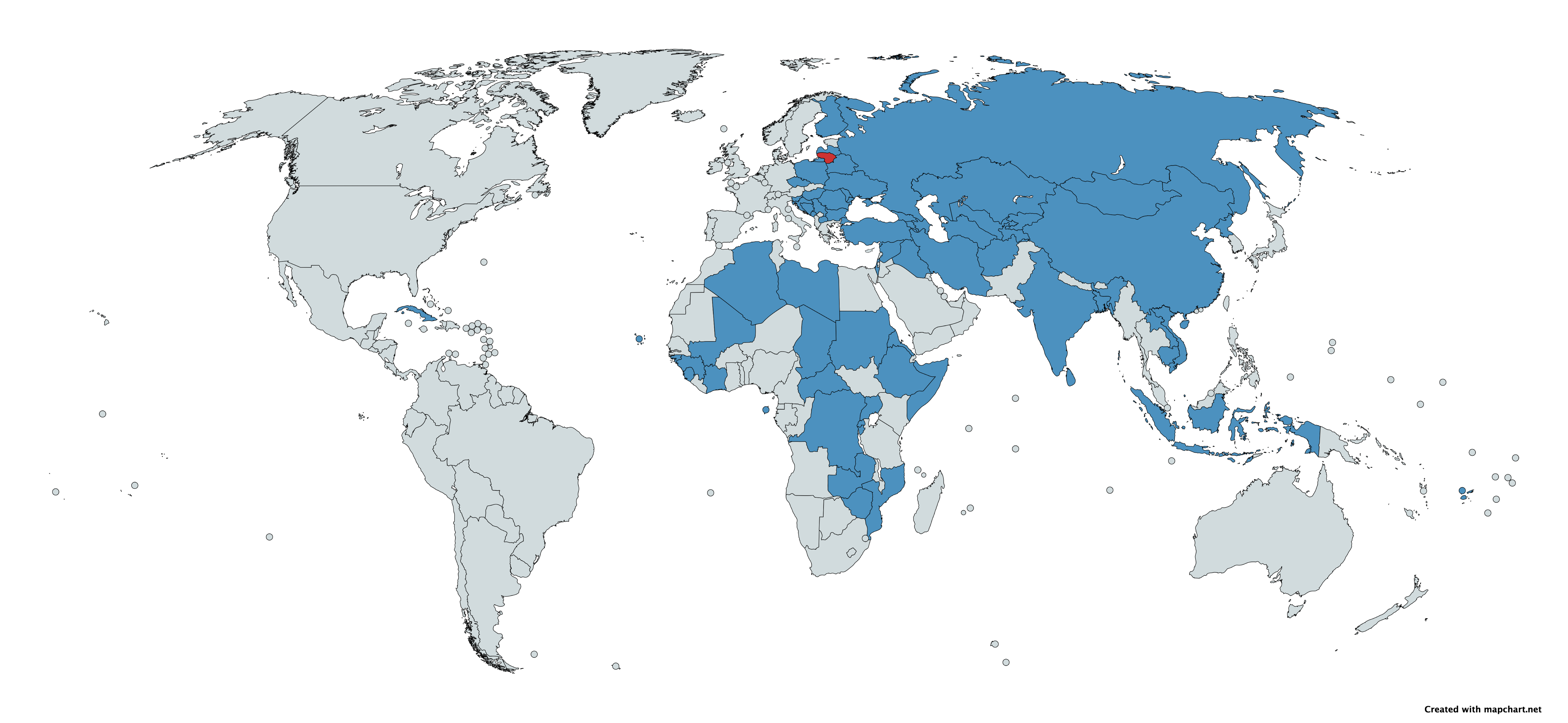
A map of PK Machine Gun users

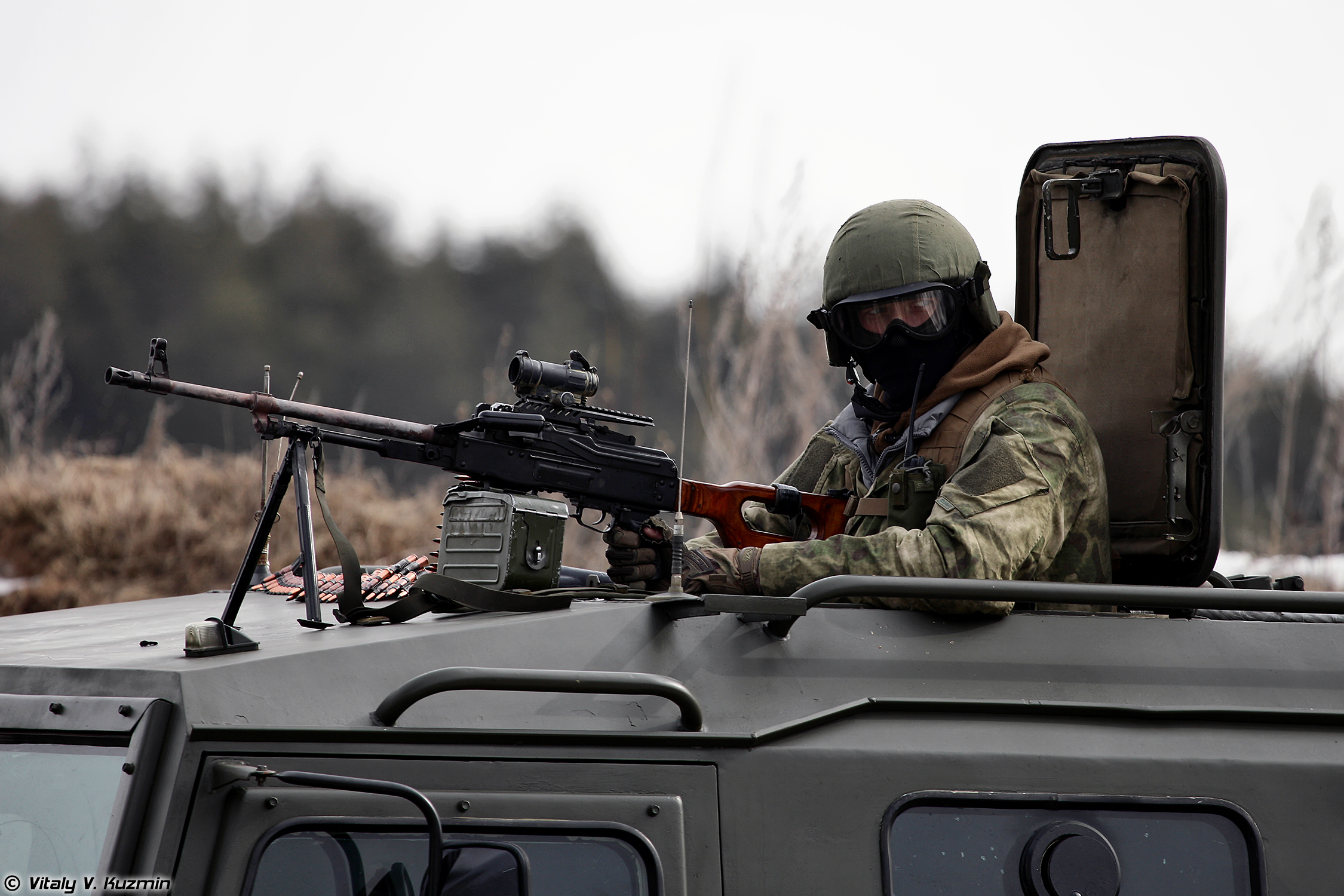
Russian police serviceman with a PK machine gun

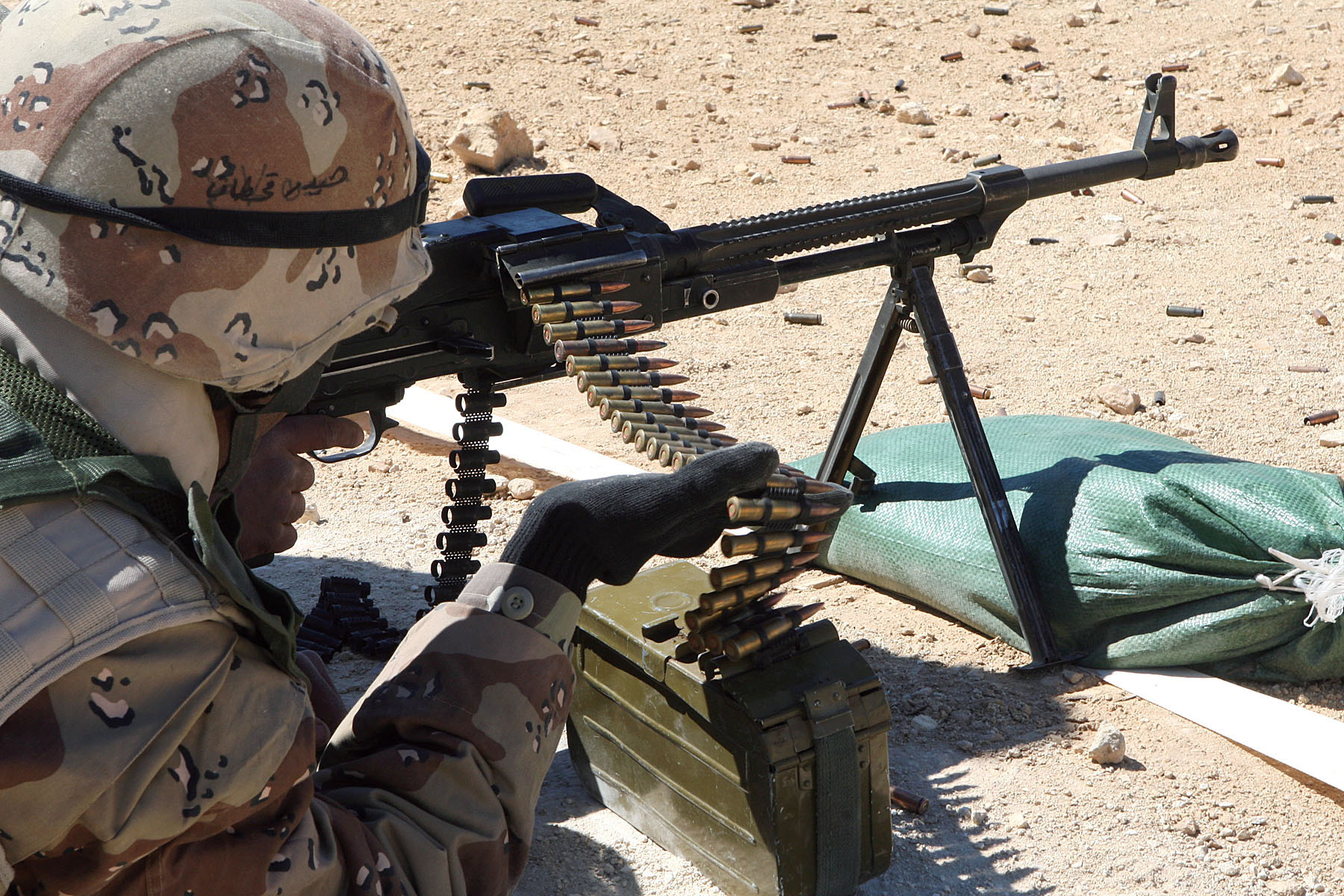
Iraqi Army soldier firing a PK machine gun as part of the School of Infantry

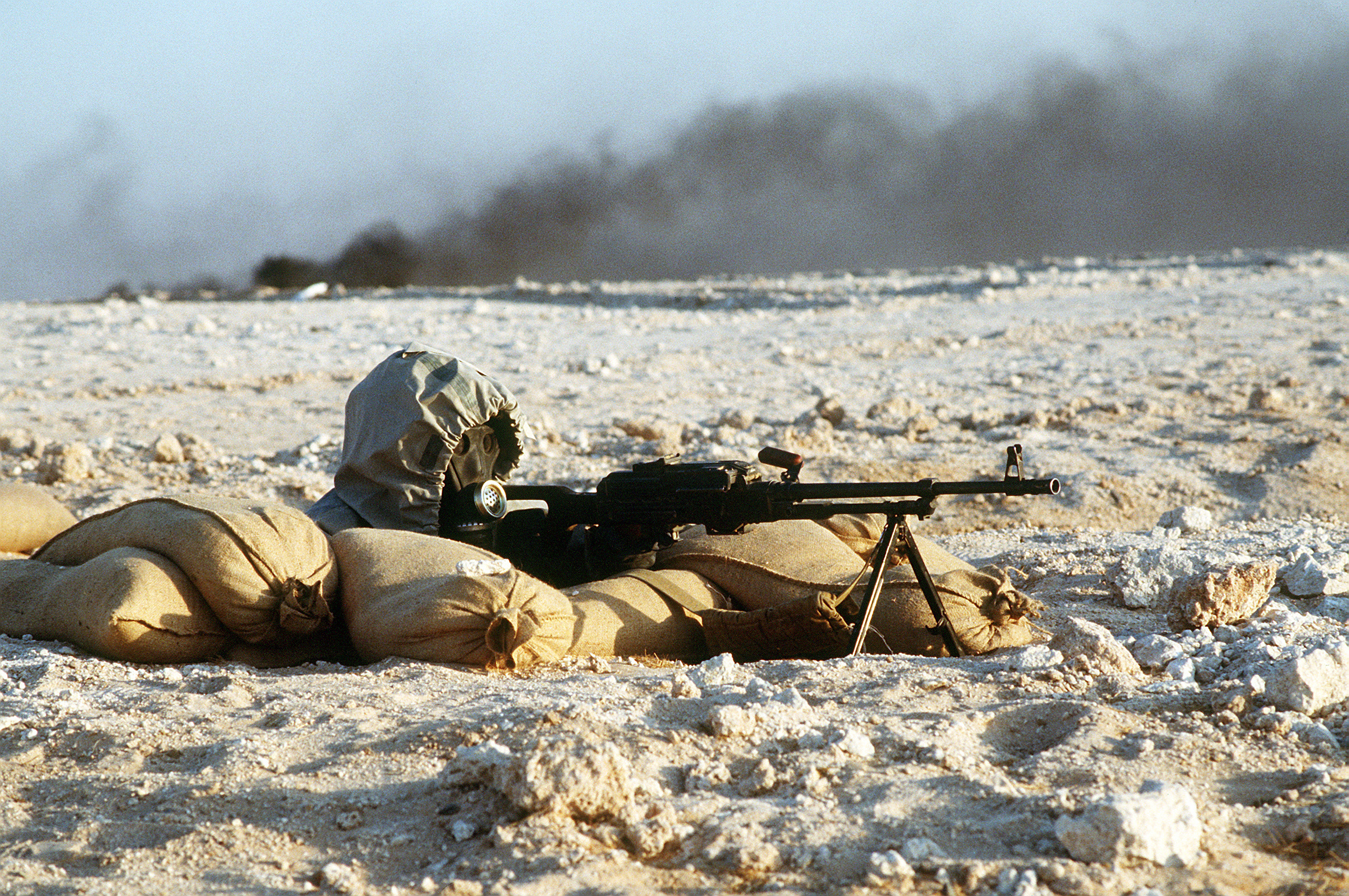
Syrian soldier with a PK machine gun

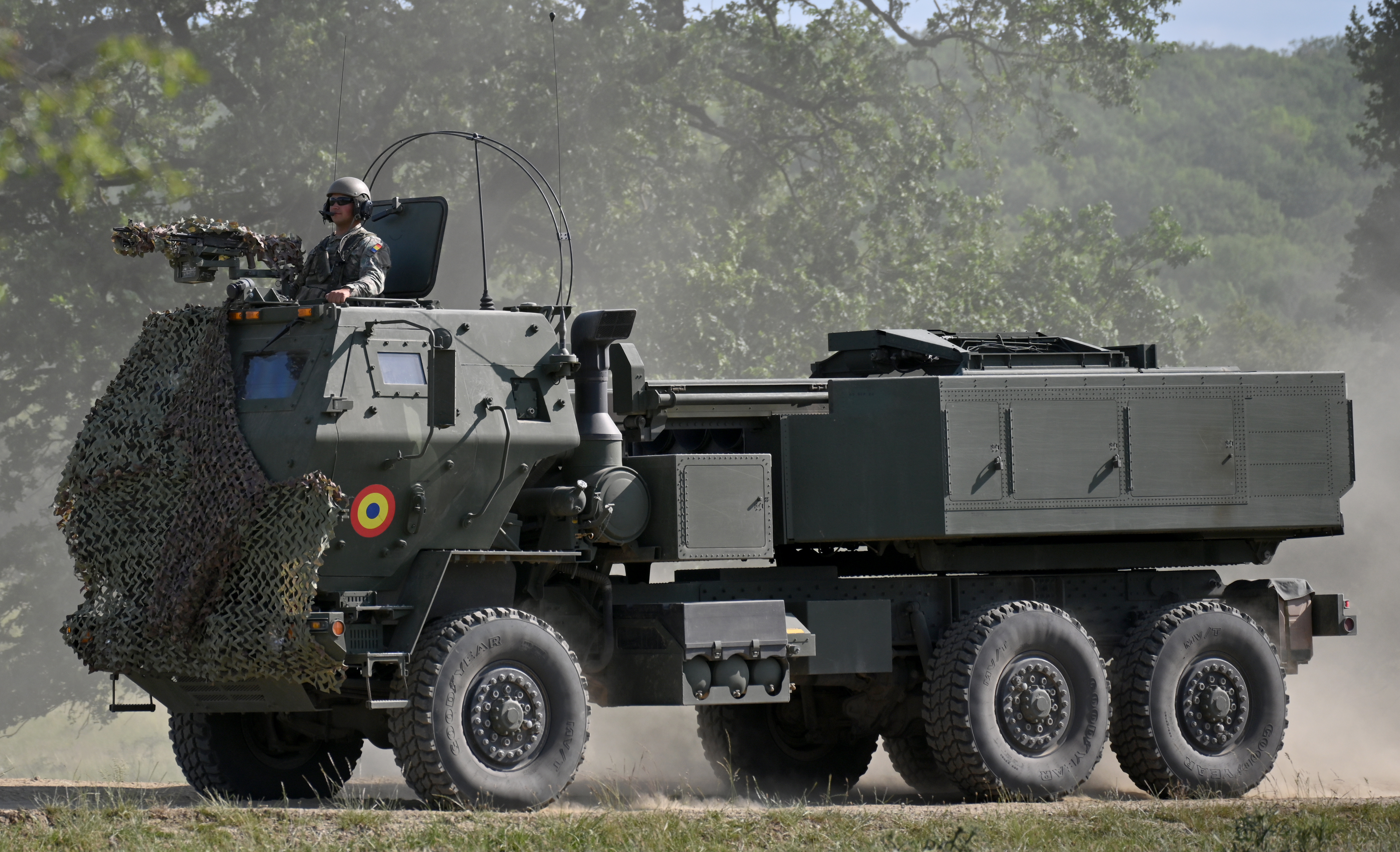
Romanian md. 66 machine gun mounted on a M142 HIMARS

- Afghanistan
- Algeria
- Armenia
- Azerbaijan
- Bangladesh: Type 80 and Arsenal MG-1MS variant.
- Belarus
- Bosnia and Herzegovina
- Bulgaria: PK/PKM copies were produced as the MG-1 & MG-1M.
- Burundi: Used by Burundian rebels.
- Cambodia
- Cape Verde
- Central African Republic
- Chad
- China: PK/PKM copies were produced as the Type 80.
- Croatia
- Cuba
- Czech Republic
- Democratic Republic of Congo: FARDC
  - Democratic Forces for the Liberation of Rwanda
- Egypt
- Eritrea
- Ethiopia
- Fiji
- Finland: Designated as 7.62 KK PKM.
- Georgia: Phasing out.
- Guinea
- Guinea-Bissau
- Hungary
- India: Used by Front line troops as well as coaxial machine gun on Tanks and APC. Locally manufactured in India at OFB Tiruchirapalli.
- Indonesia: PKT mounted on BVP-2 and BTR-50PK of the Indonesian Marine Corps.
- Iran:
- Iraq: PKS and PKT variants. PKS being called as the "Be-Ke-Se".
- Israel
- Ivory Coast
- Kazakhstan
- Kyrgyzstan
- Laos
- Latvia
- Libya
- Mali
- Moldova
  - Transnistria
- Mongolia
- Montenegro
- Mozambique
- North Korea: Clones made known as the Type 82. According to Mitzer and Oliemans, the GPMG is known as the Type 68.
- North Macedonia
- Palestine - In service with the Palestinian national security forces.
- Philippines: Bulgarian MG-M2 variants, in limited numbers with Philippine Army.
- Poland: PK/PKM copies were produced.
- Romania: Mitraliera md. 66, licensed copies of the PK/PKM were produced.
- Russia
- Rwanda
- São Tomé and Príncipe
- Sierra Leone: Used on vehicles.
- Sudan
- Serbia: Made under license as the Zastava M84/M86.
- Slovenia
- Somalia: Jowhar government of Mohamed Dheere.
- Sri Lanka: Type 80 variant.
- Syria
- Tajikistan
- Turkmenistan
- Turkey Known as Biksi or Bixi in Turkish service. MKEK announced production of PKs.
- Uganda
  - Lord Resistance Army
- Ukraine PKT, PKM locally produce as KT-7.62 and KM-7.62 by Mayak.
- Uzbekistan
- Vietnam: Supplied by the Soviets in the late 1970s. A modernised copy of the PKM has been developed and manufactured by Z111 Factory, designated as the "ĐL7N". Another version based on the PKP Pecheneg has also been developed, designated as the "STrL-P".
- Zambia
- Zimbabwe

=== Former users ===
- Chechen Republic of Ichkeria - Used by Chechen forces during the First Chechen War
- East Germany
- Lithuania
- Soviet Union: Two issued per squad in the Soviet Army.
- Yugoslavia: PKM copies were produced as the Zastava M84.

=== Non-state users ===
- Islamic State
- Kurdistan Workers' Party
- Hezbollah

== Conflicts ==
=== 1960s ===
- Vietnam War (1955–1975)
- Laotian Civil War (1960–1975)
- Rhodesian Bush War (1964–1979)
- Communist insurgency in Thailand (1965–1983)
- South African Border War (1966–1990)
- Cambodian Civil War (1968–1975)

=== 1970s ===
- Ethiopian Civil War (1974–1991)
- Lebanese Civil War (1975–1990)
- Western Sahara War (1975–1991)
- Angolan Civil War (1975–2002)
- Egyptian–Libyan War (1977)
- Ogaden War (1977–1978)
- Cambodian–Vietnamese War (1978–1989)
- Sino-Vietnamese War (1979)
- Salvadoran Civil War (1979–1992)
- Soviet–Afghan War (1979–1989)

=== 1980s ===
- Iran–Iraq War (1980–1988)
- Lord's Resistance Army insurgency (1987–present)
- First Nagorno-Karabakh War (1988–1994)
- First Afghan Civil War (1989–1992)
- Kurdish Rebellion in Iran (1979–1989)

=== 1990s ===
- Tuareg rebellion (1990–1995)
- Gulf War (1990–1991)
- KDPI Insurgency (1989–1996)
- Somali Civil War (1991–present)
- Yugoslav Wars (1991–2001)
- Second Afghan Civil War (1992–1996)
- Burundian Civil War (1993–2005)
- First Chechen War (1994–1996)
- First Congo War (1996–1997)
- Third Afghan Civil War (1996–2001)
- Eritrean–Ethiopian War (1998–2000)
- Second Congo War (1998–2003)
- Second Chechen War (1999–2009)

=== 2000s ===
- War in Afghanistan (2001–2021)
- Iraq War (2003–2011)
- 2008–2013 Cambodian–Thai border crisis
- Russo-Georgian War (2008)
- Boko Haram insurgency (2009–present)

=== 2010s ===
- First Libyan Civil War (2011)
- Syrian Civil War (2011–2024)
- Mali War (2012–present)
- Russo-Ukrainian War (2014–present)
  - War in Donbas (2014–2022)
- Second Libyan Civil War (2014–2020)
- Yemeni Civil War (2014–present)
  - Saudi Arabian-led intervention in Yemen (2015–present)
  - Houthi–Saudi Arabian conflict (2015–present)
- Ethiopian civil conflict (2018–present)

=== 2020s ===
- Second Nagorno-Karabakh War (2020)
- Tigray War (2020–2022)
- Russian invasion of Ukraine (2022–present)
- War in Amhara (2023–present)
- Wagner Group rebellion (2023)
- Gaza war (2023–present)
- 2025 Cambodia-Thailand conflict (2025)

== See also ==
- FN MAG
- FN Minimi
- IWI Negev
- M60 machine gun
- Mk 48 machine gun
- Sumitomo Type 62
- Type 67 machine gun
- UKM-2000

== Notes ==
=== Bibliography ===
- Mitzer, Stijn; Oliemans, Joost (2020). The Armed Forces of North Korea: On the Path of Songun. Helion and Company. ISBN 978-1910777145.
