= UK vz. 59 =

Uk vz. 59
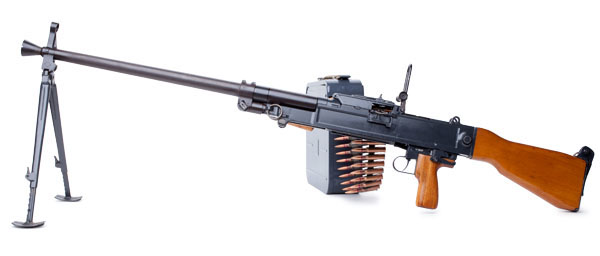
- Type: General-purpose machine gun
- Place of origin: Czechoslovakia

Service history
- In service: 1959–present
- Used by: Czech Republic; Slovakia
- Wars: Vietnam War; Nigerian Civil War; Lebanese Civil War; Afghanistan Wars; Uganda–Tanzania War; Angolan Civil War; South African Border War; Tajikistani Civil War; Mali War; Kivu conflict Russo-Georgian War; Libyan Civil War; Russian invasion of Ukraine

Production history
- Designed: 1956-1959
- Manufacturer: Zbrojovka Vsetín
- Produced: 1959—1990s
- Variants: Vz. 59 L, vz. 59T, vz. 59N, vz. 68, vz. 95, vz. 98

Specifications
- Mass: 9.28 kg (20.5 lb) (vz. 59); 8.67 kg (19.1 lb) (vz. 59 L)
- Length: 1,215 mm (47.8 in) (vz. 59); 1,115 mm (43.9 in) (vz. 59 L)
- Barrel length: 650 mm (25.6 in) (vz. 59); 550 mm (21.7 in) (vz. 59 L)
- Cartridge: 7.62×54mmR / 7.62×51mm NATO
- Action: Gas-operated, tilting breechblock
- Rate of fire: 700-800 rounds/min
- Muzzle velocity: 830 m/s (2,723 ft/s) (vz. 59); 810 m/s (2,657 ft/s) (vz. 59 L)
- Effective firing range: 100 to 2000 m sight adjustments
- Feed system: Belt-fed 50-round, weight 0.19 kg unloaded or 250 round belt
- Sights: Hooded front post, folding leaf rear sight, sight radius 353 mm (13.9 in)

The Universal Machine Gun Model 1959 (Czech: Univerzální kulomet vzor 59) is a general-purpose machine gun developed in Czechoslovakia in the 1950s. It remains in use by the Czech Army and the Slovak Armed Forces.

== Description ==
The Uk vz. 59 fires 7.62×54mmR ammunition (although a Vz. 59N variant for 7.62×51mm NATO ammunition also exists), delivered via an ammunition belt. The weapon can serve as a light (light barrel and bipod, vz. 59L model) and medium machine gun (heavy barrel and tripod), and can also be used as a co-axial mounted weapon (Vz. 59T version).

The machine gun is equipped with a lever-type feed mechanism introduced in Louis Stange's MG 39 Rh, which is operated by the feed lever mounted outside the right wall of the receiver.

The pistol grip acts as the charging handle for the Uk vz. 59.

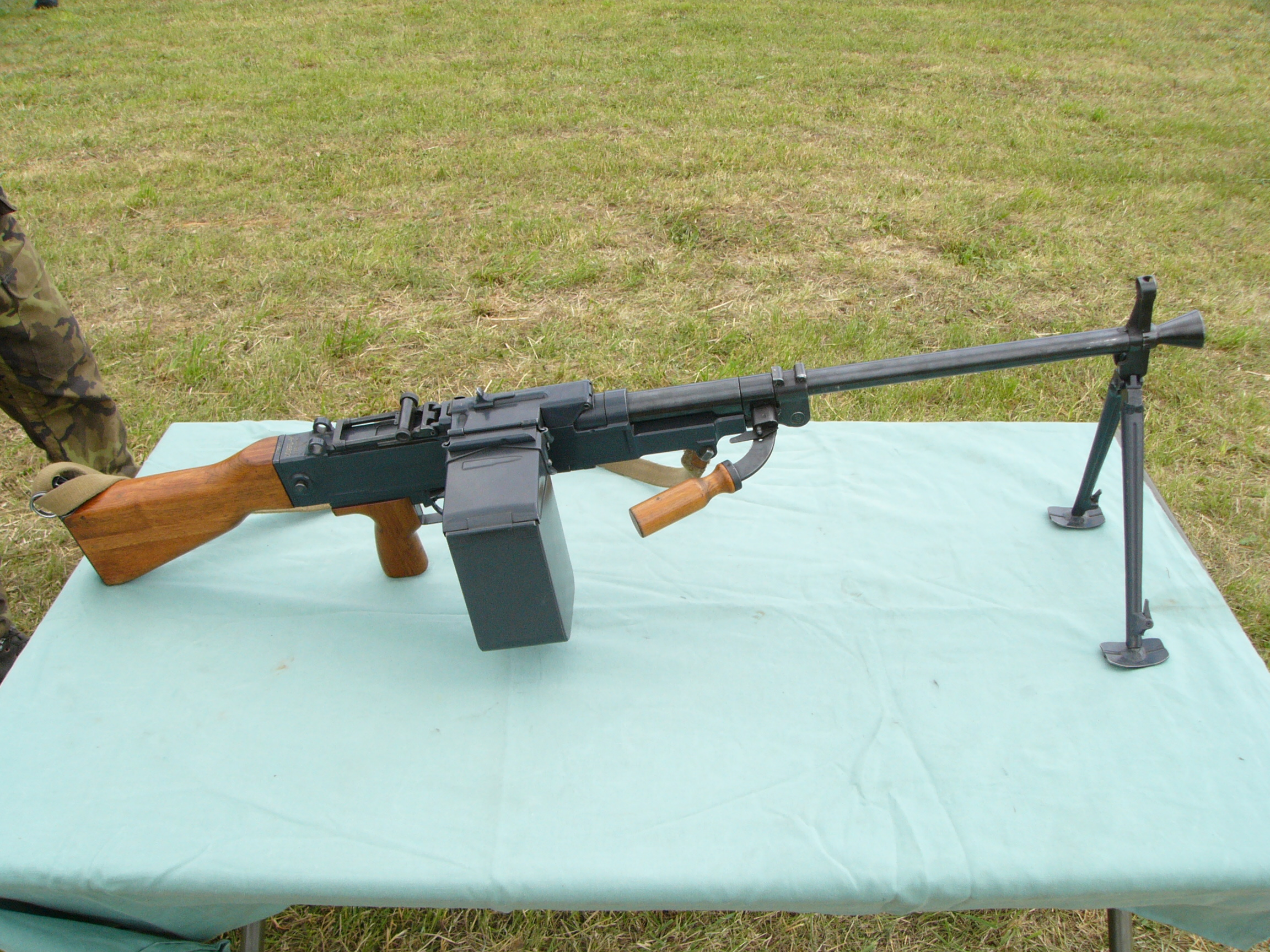
UK-L vz. 59 with bipod.

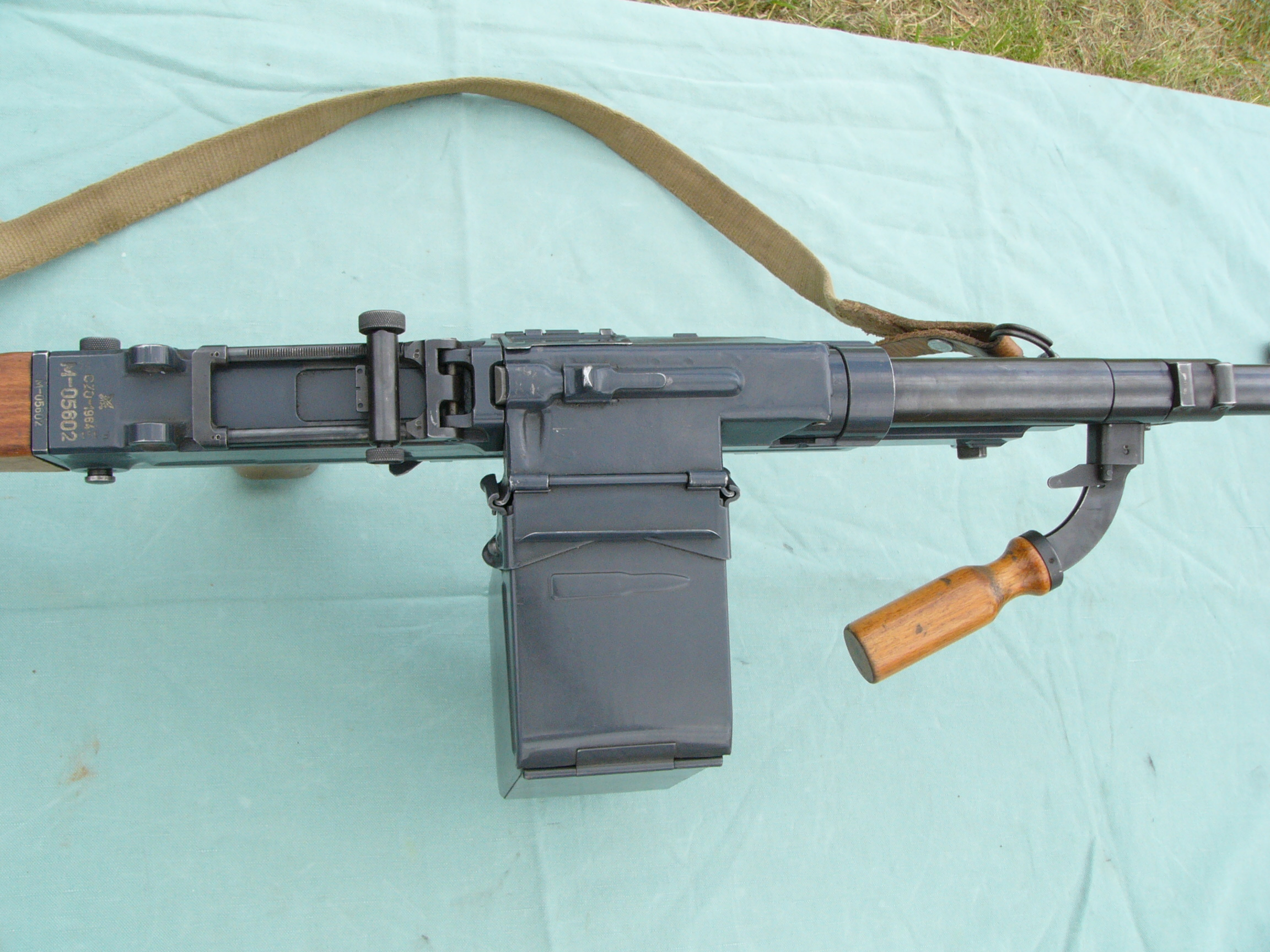
Detail of the UK-L vz. 59.

== Users ==
- Afghanistan
- Biafra
- Czech Republic
- Democratic Republic of Congo: Armed Forces of the Democratic Republic of the Congo

- Democratic Forces for the Liberation of Rwanda

- Georgia
- India: Formerly used by Special forces
- Libya
- Mali
- Slovakia
- Tajikistan
- Tanzania
- Ukraine: 3,200 UK vz.59s were gifted from the Czech Republic, sent as part of a military package in response to the 2022 Russian invasion of Ukraine.
- Vietnam: used by the PAVN and Viet Cong during the Vietnam War.

== Gallery ==
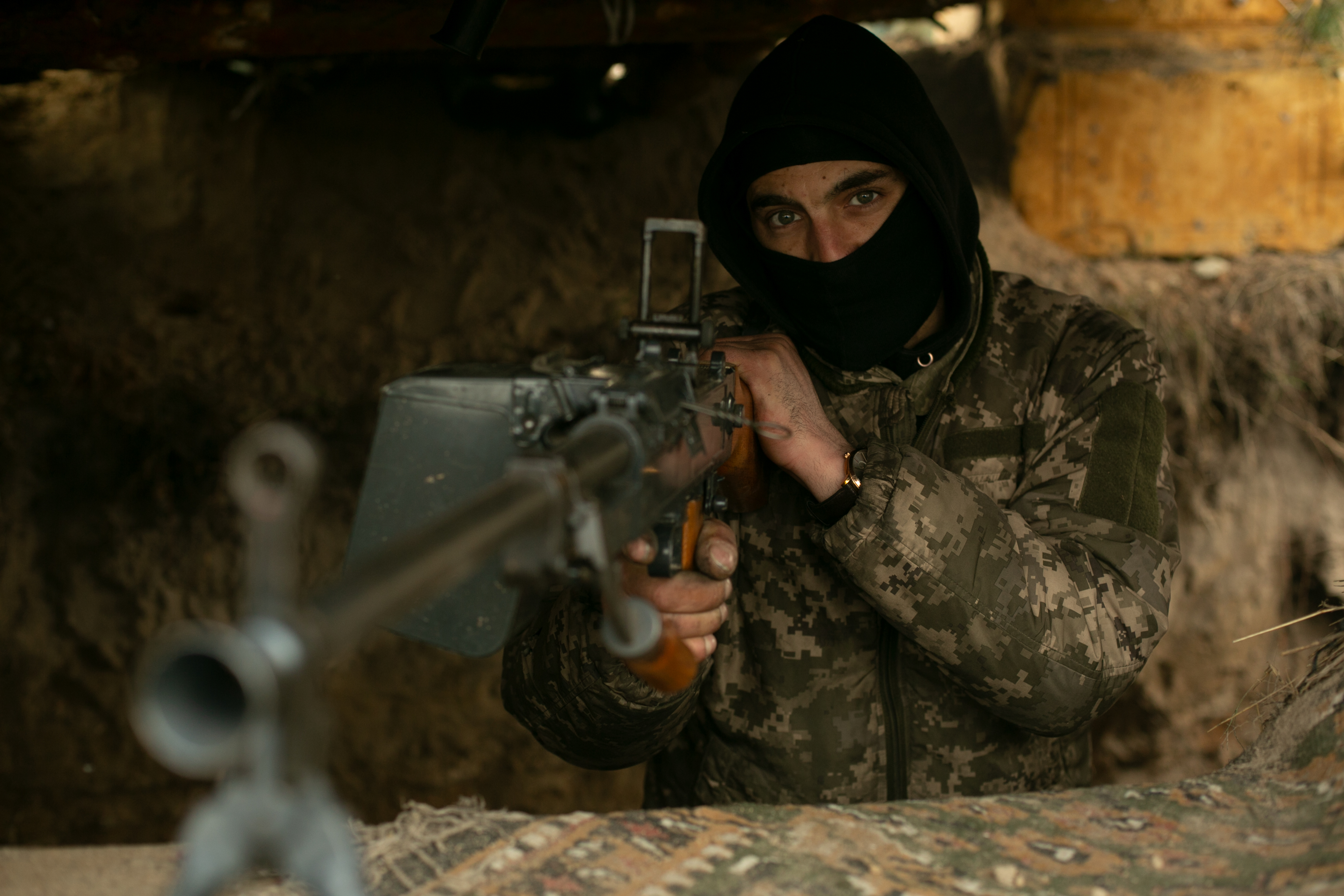
Ukrainian volunteer with UK vz. 59

== See also ==
- URZ AP
