= 7.62×45mm =

Intermediate rifle cartridge

7.62×45mm vz. 52
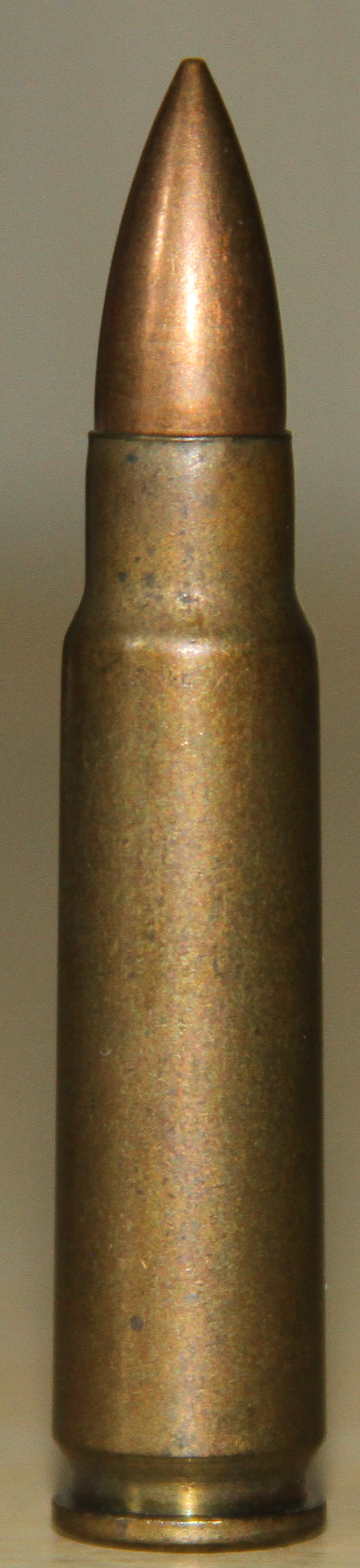
- Type: Rifle
- Place of origin: Czechoslovakia

Service history
- In service: 1952–1957
- Used by: Czechoslovakia

Production history
- Designer: Alois Farlík
- Designed: 1940s
- Produced: 1952

Specifications
- Case type: Rimless, bottleneck
- Bullet diameter: 7.83 mm (0.308 in)
- Neck diameter: 8.66 mm (0.341 in)
- Shoulder diameter: 10.56 mm (0.416 in)
- Base diameter: 11.30 mm (0.445 in)
- Rim diameter: 11.30 mm (0.445 in)
- Rim thickness: 1.50 mm (0.059 in)
- Case length: 45.00 mm (1.772 in)
- Overall length: 60.00 mm (2.362 in)
- Case capacity: 2.79 cm^{3} (43.1 gr H_{2}O)
- Rifling twist: 280 mm (1 in 11.03 in)
- Primer type: Berdan rifle or Large rifle
- Maximum pressure (C.I.P.): 430.00 MPa (62,366 psi)

Ballistic performance
Bullet mass/type	Velocity	Energy
8.5 g (131 gr)	760 m/s (2,500 ft/s)	2,455 J (1,811 ft⋅lbf)
- Test barrel length: 520 mm (20.472 in)

The 7.62×45mm (designated as the 7,62 × 45 by the C.I.P.) is a rimless bottlenecked intermediate rifle cartridge developed in Czechoslovakia. It is fired by the Czech Vz. 52 rifle, Vz. 52 light machine gun, and ZB-530 machine gun. The cartridge was later dropped from use when the Czech converted to the standard 7.62×39mm Warsaw Pact cartridge of the Soviet Union. Its muzzle velocity and muzzle energy are slightly higher than that of the 7.62×39mm cartridge, and is on par with the .30-30 Winchester cartridge, with equivalent projectiles.

== Cartridge dimensions ==
The 7.62×45mm has a 2.79 mL (43.1 gr H_{2}O) cartridge case capacity. The exterior shape of the case was designed to promote reliable case feeding and extraction in bolt-action and semi-automatic rifles and machine guns alike, under extreme conditions.

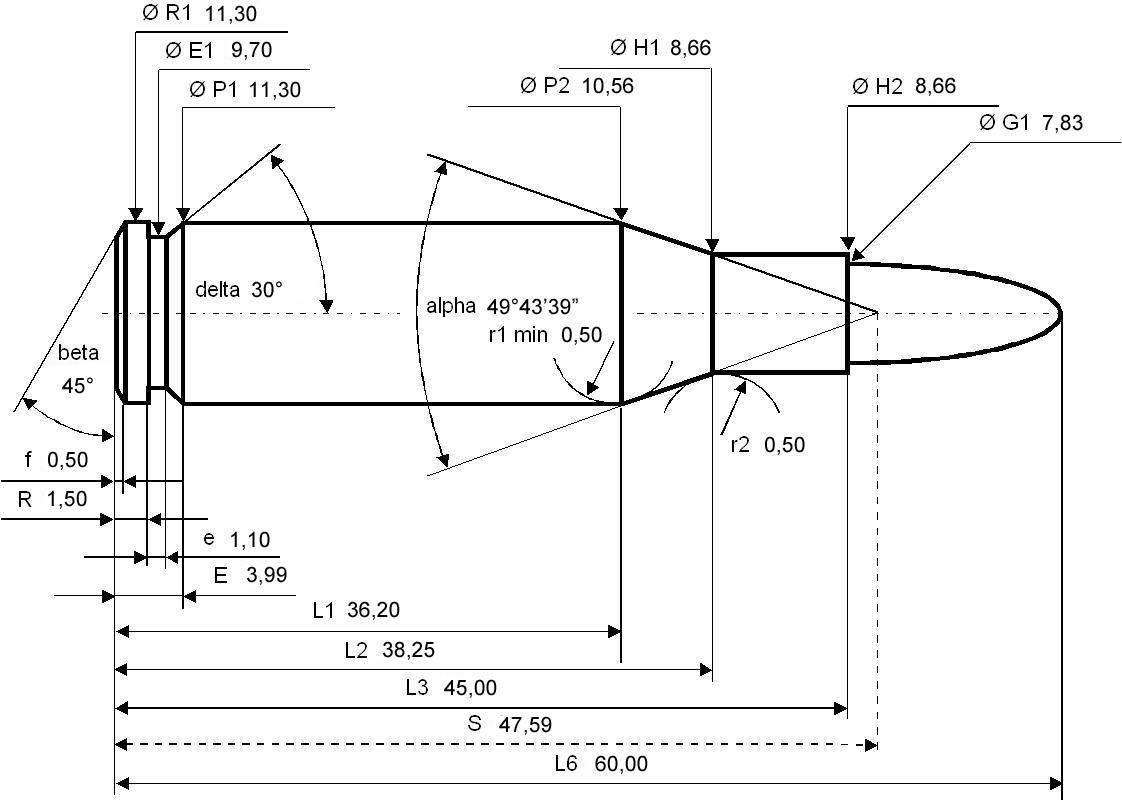

7.62×45mm maximum C.I.P. cartridge dimensions. All sizes in millimeters (mm).

Americans would define the shoulder angle at alpha/2 ≈ 24.9 degrees. The common rifling twist rate for this cartridge is 280 mm (1 in 11.03 in), 4 grooves, Ø lands = 7.62 millimetres (0.300 in), Ø grooves = 7.88 millimetres (0.310 in), land width = 3.50 millimetres (0.138 in) and the primer type is Berdan or Boxer (in large rifle size).

According to the official C.I.P. (Commission Internationale Permanente pour l'Epreuve des Armes à Feu Portatives) rulings the 7.62×45mm can handle up to 430.00 MPa (62,366 psi) P_{max} piezo pressure. In C.I.P. regulated countries every rifle cartridge combo has to be proofed at 125% of this maximum C.I.P. pressure to certify for sale to consumers. This means that 7.62×45mm chambered arms in C.I.P. regulated countries are currently (2014) proof tested at 537.50 MPa (77,958 psi) PE piezo pressure.

=== Non-official dimensions ===
There are definite differences in reported dimensions from non-official sources for this cartridge. Some of this may be accounted for by small errors in conversion from metric to inches, while others such as loaded length may additionally be attributed to different lengths of bullets being measured in loaded rounds. A sample list of various measurements is in the table below.

Various reported dimensions for the 7.62×45mm vz. 52
Source	Case length	Overall (loaded) length	Bullet weight	Loaded weight
Cartridges of the World	44.958 mm (1.77 in)	59.94 mm (2.36 in)	-	-
Cartridge Corner	44.958 mm (1.77 in)	57.40 mm (2.26 in)	-	-
Handloader's Manual of Cartridge Conversions	44.80 mm (1.764 in)	62.23 mm (2.45 in)	-	-
40 let konstruktérem zbraní 1946–1986	45 mm (1.772 in)	60 mm (2.362 in)	8.5 g (0.30 oz)	18.9 g (0.67 oz)
Československé automatické zbraně a jejich tvůrci	44.9 mm (1.768 in)	60 mm (2.362 in)	8.5 g (0.30 oz)	18.9 g (0.67 oz)

=== Dimensionally similar ===
The 7.62×45mm cartridge is approximately of the same overall length as the 5.56 NATO and .223 Remington cartridges common in the United States, and will "fit" into AR-15 pattern magazines designed for the 6.5mm Grendel cartridge (as well as those for cartridges with dimensionally close case bodies). Re-barreling, or even "Sleeving" the barrel of the Czech Vz.52 carbine in order to shoot 6.5mm Grendel is a viable option that provides a common factory / boxer primed and reloadable compatible cartridge. 6.5 Grendel was originally designed for the AR15 class of firearms, and therefore has power level (pressure) ratings that are within the limits of that class. As such, the C.I.P.-listed pressure levels for the 6.5 Grendel are lower than those listed by the C.I.P. for the 7.62×45mm (C.I.P.: 430.00 MPa (62,366 psi)). The .250 Savage would also be another reasonable option for rebarreling the Vz.52 rifle, if intending to use the OEM magazine attention to the Overall Length (OAL) of the finished cartridge will be important.

=== Reloading ===
The C.I.P. lists the projectile diameter as 7.83 mm (.311–.312 caliber), which is the same bullet diameter as the British .303 British cartridges and Soviet ".30 caliber" rounds like 7.62×39mm. .308 Winchester(7.62 mm)-size bullets are safe and usable but would not necessarily be the most accurate. Reloading in this chambering is a nuisance in the United States. Boxer-primed cases can be easily formed via resizing and trimming 6.5×52mm Carcano brass, but these are difficult to obtain. Another route is to use the .220 Swift cartridge, but along with resizing and trimming, this also requires turning the rims down on a lathe and cutting deeper extractor grooves. .300 Savage is probably the closest in size for a relatively available American Boxer-primed reloadable .30 caliber cartridge. the .300 Savage case is <12 mm in diameter at the base (vs 11.3mm), <11.35 mm at the shoulder, and longer by just over 2.5 mm at 47.52 mm. A .300 Savage chamber reamer can open up the Vz.52 chamber to the correct .300 Savage cartridge case body dimensions with the deeper and wider shoulder; OAL would have to be adjusted to fit the magazine as well.

=== Wildcats ===
The 7.62×45mm case is also used as the parent case for a modified variant that is not officially registered with or sanctioned by the C.I.P. or its American equivalent, the SAAMI. Such cartridges which use commercial factory cases are generally known as wildcats. By changing the shape of standard factory cases (decreasing case taper and/or changing the shoulder geometry) the wildcatter generally increases the case capacity of the factory parent cartridge case, allowing more propellant to be used to generate higher velocities. Besides changing the shape and internal volume of the parent cartridge case, wildcatters also can change the original calibre. A reason to change the original calibre can be to comply with a minimal permitted calibre or bullet weight for the legal hunting of certain species of game or change external or terminal ballistic behavior. In his spare time Chis E. Murray has been developing a cartridge which he calls the 7×46mm Universal Intermediate Assault Cartridge. The 7×46mm is designed to replace both the 5.56mm and 7.62mm NATO cartridges. It is low recoil and so can be used from carbines, but has long enough range to be used in machine guns and designated marksmen rifles. Its overall length has been optimized so that guns chambering it would be bigger than AR-15s but smaller than AR-10s.

== Gallery ==
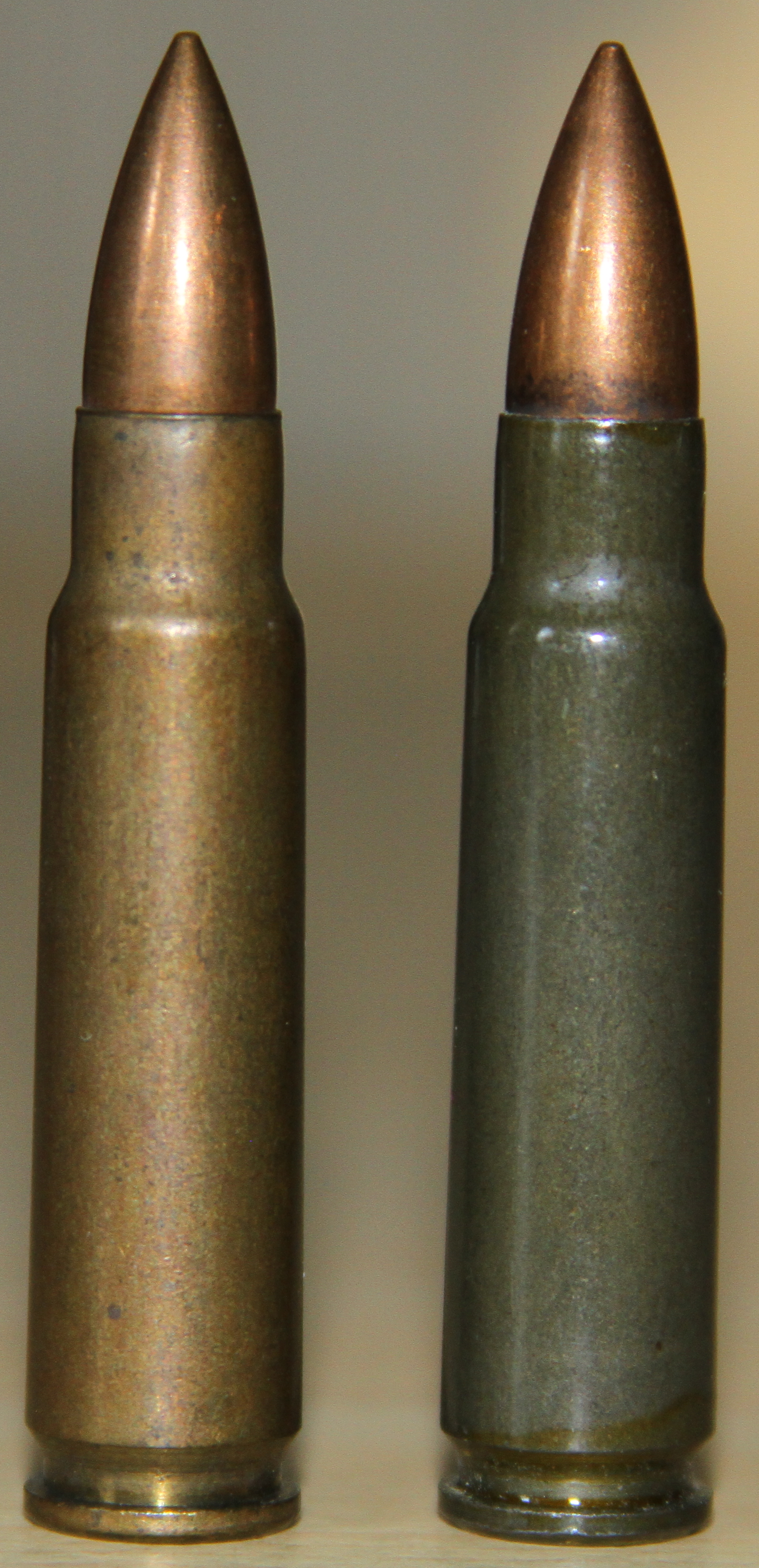
7.62×45mm brass case cartridge (left) and 7.62×45mm steel case cartridge (right).

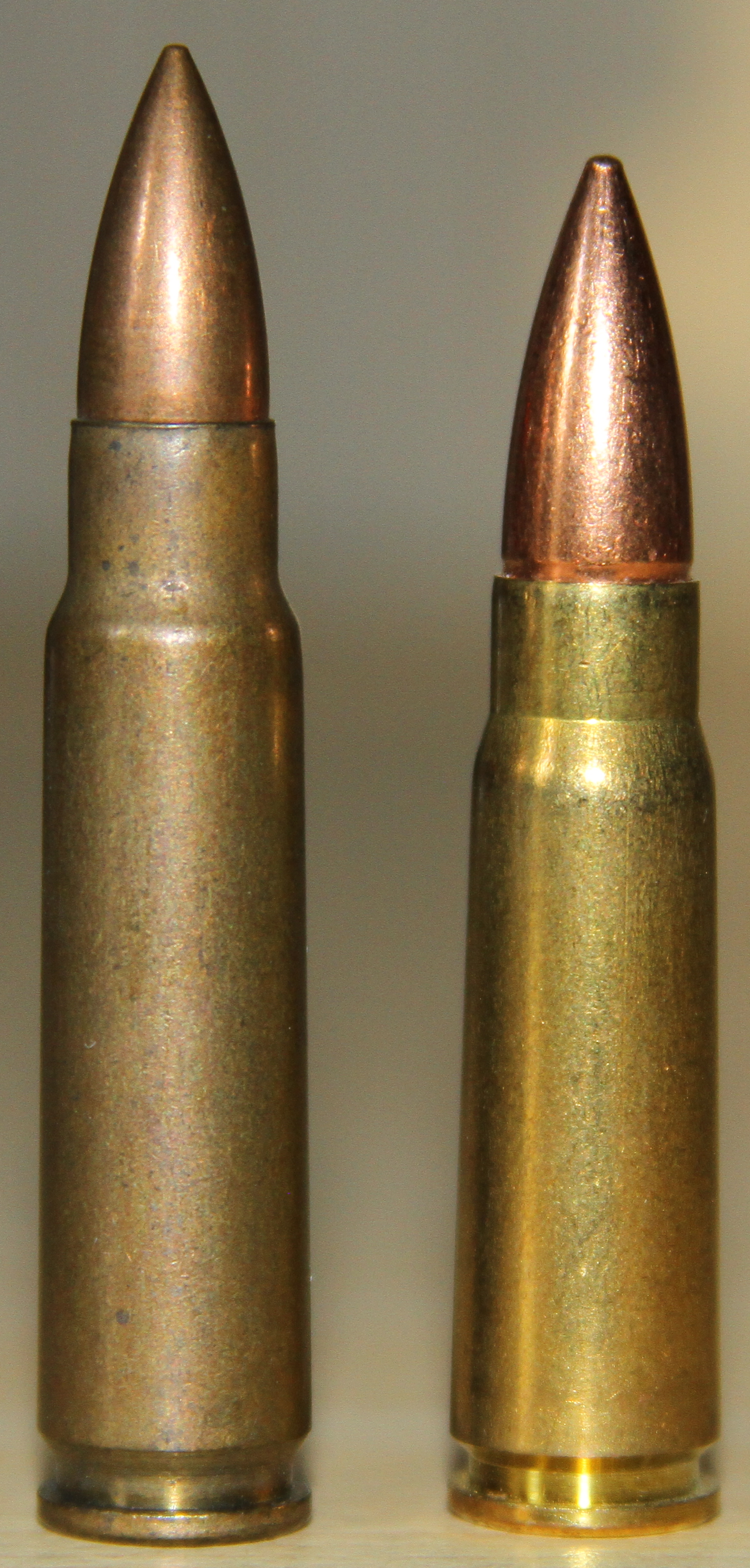
7.62×45mm cartridge (left) and 7.62×39mm cartridge (right).

== See also ==
- 7 mm caliber
- List of rifle cartridges
