= URZ AP =

URZ AP (Univerzální ruční zbraň Automatická puška)
- Type: Battle rifle; modular weapon system
- Place of origin: Czechoslovakia

Production history
- Designer: Jiří Čermák
- Designed: 1967
- Variants: AP, LK, TK, T

Specifications
- Length: 995 mm
- Barrel length: 500 mm
- Cartridge: 7.62×51mm NATO
- Caliber: 7.62 mm
- Action: Roller Delayed blowback
- Rate of fire: 800 rpm
- Muzzle velocity: 800 m/s
- Feed system: 50 round belt
- Sights: Iron

The URZ AP (abbreviation of Univerzální ruční zbraň Automatická puška) is a modular weapon system of Czechoslovak origin.

== Development ==
The "series of weapons" concept was first pioneered by the French with the Berthier machine rifle and the Stoner 63 was developed by Jiří Čermák in the late 1960s, who also designed the SA Vz. 58 rifle. The weapons series was to replace everything from submachine guns to general purpose machine guns. The URZ APT used the receiver, which in all variants were belt-fed from a cylindrical container. Most unusual for a Warsaw Pact country, the URZ AP was chambered in 7.62×51mm NATO as it was intended for export.

The URZ AP is a 7.62×51mm NATO calibre delayed blowback battle rifle. The weapon uses a rotating bolt delayed blowback operation with 2 lugs with rollers to overcome a quarter twist to accelerate the bolt carrier and unlock. To ease extraction, the barrel has a fluted chamber to prevent ruptured cartridges. The select fire capability fires from a closed bolt in semi-auto and an open bolt in full auto. The belt feed uses a feeding rotor found in the ammo box.
