= Armoured fighting vehicle =

Combat vehicle with both armament and armour

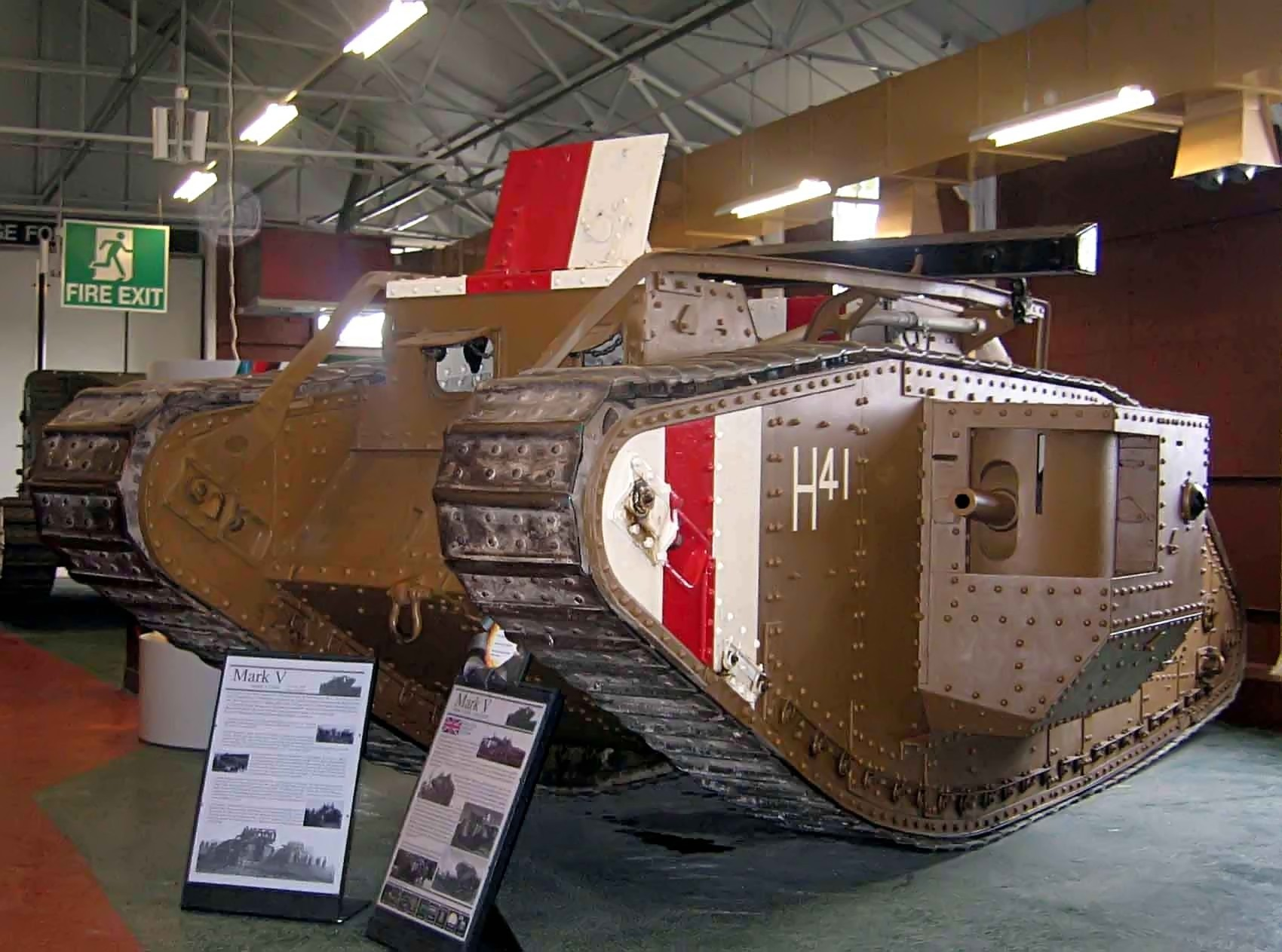
WW1 Mark V tank, in The Tank Museum, Dorset, England

An armoured fighting vehicle (British English) or armored fighting vehicle (American English) (AFV) is an armed combat vehicle protected by armour, generally combining operational mobility with offensive and defensive capabilities. AFVs can be wheeled or tracked. Examples of AFVs are tank destroyers, armoured cars, assault guns, self-propelled artilleries, infantry fighting vehicles (IFV), and armoured personnel carriers (APC).

Armoured fighting vehicles are classified according to their characteristics and intended role on the battlefield. The classifications are not absolute; two countries may classify the same vehicle differently, and the criteria change over time. For example, relatively lightly armed armoured personnel carriers were largely superseded by infantry fighting vehicles with much heavier armament in a similar role.

Successful designs are often adapted to a wide variety of applications. For example, the MOWAG Piranha, originally designed as an APC, has been adapted to fill numerous roles such as a mortar carrier, infantry fighting vehicle, and assault gun.

Armoured fighting vehicles began to appear in use in World War I with the armoured car, the tank, the self-propelled gun, and the personnel carrier seeing use. By World War II, armies had large numbers of AFVs, together with other vehicles to carry troops this permitted highly mobile manoeuvre warfare.

== Evolution ==
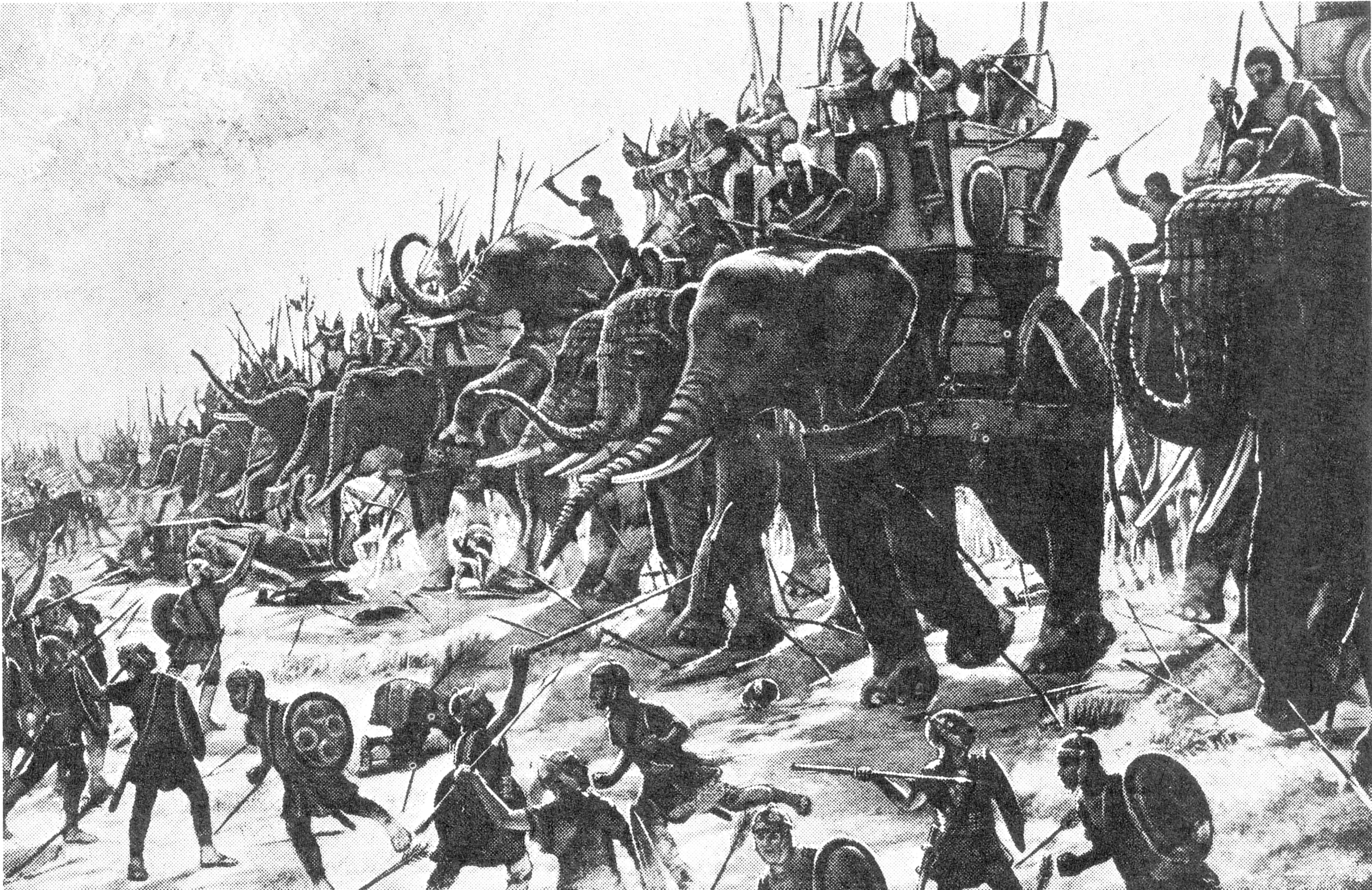
Battle of Zama by Henri-Paul Motte, 1890

The concept of a highly mobile and protected fighting unit has been around for centuries; from Hannibal's war elephants to Leonardo's contraptions, military strategists endeavoured to maximize the mobility and survivability of their soldiers.

Armoured fighting vehicles were not possible until internal combustion engines of sufficient power became available at the start of the 20th century.

=== History ===
==== Pre-modern ====
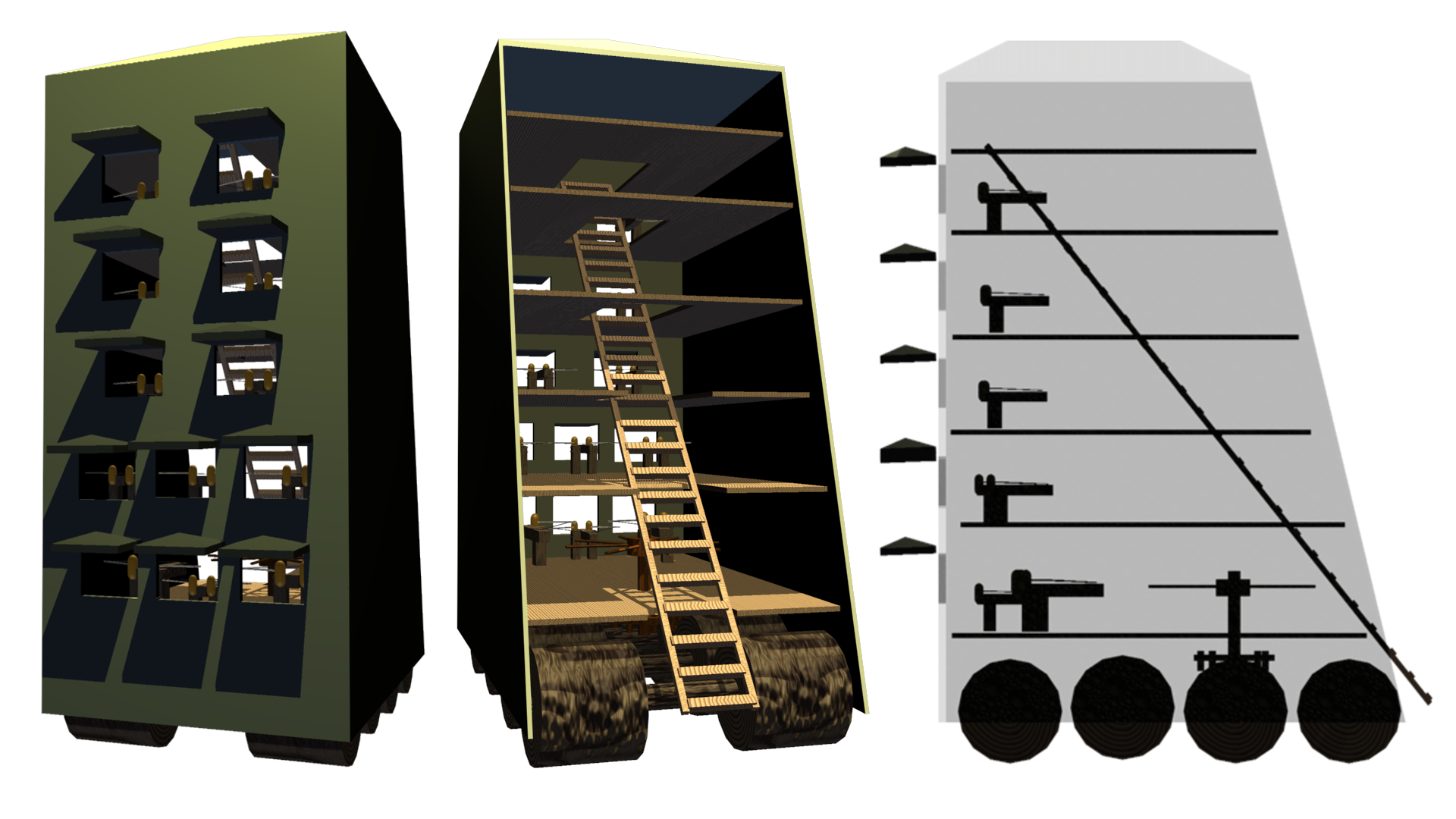
A Helepolis-like Siege Engine showing ballistae, stairs and movement capstan

Modern armoured fighting vehicles represent the realization of an ancient concept – that of providing troops with mobile protection and firepower. Armies have deployed war machines and cavalries with rudimentary armour in battle for millennia. Use of these animals and engineering designs sought to achieve a balance between the conflicting needs of mobility, firepower and protection.

===== Siege machine =====
Siege engines, such as battering rams and siege towers, would often be armoured in order to protect their crews from enemy action. Polyidus of Thessaly developed a very large movable siege tower, the helepolis, as early as 340 BC, and Greek forces used such structures in the Siege of Rhodes (305 BC).

The idea of a protected fighting vehicle has been known since antiquity. Frequently cited is Leonardo da Vinci's 15th-century sketch of a mobile, protected gun-platform; the drawings show a conical, wooden shelter with apertures for cannons around the circumference. The machine was to be mounted on four wheels which would be turned by the crew through a system of hand cranks and cage (or "lantern") gears. Leonardo claimed: "I will build armoured wagons which will be safe and invulnerable to enemy attacks. There will be no obstacle which it cannot overcome." Modern replicas have demonstrated that the human crew would have been able to move it over only short distances.

===== War wagon =====
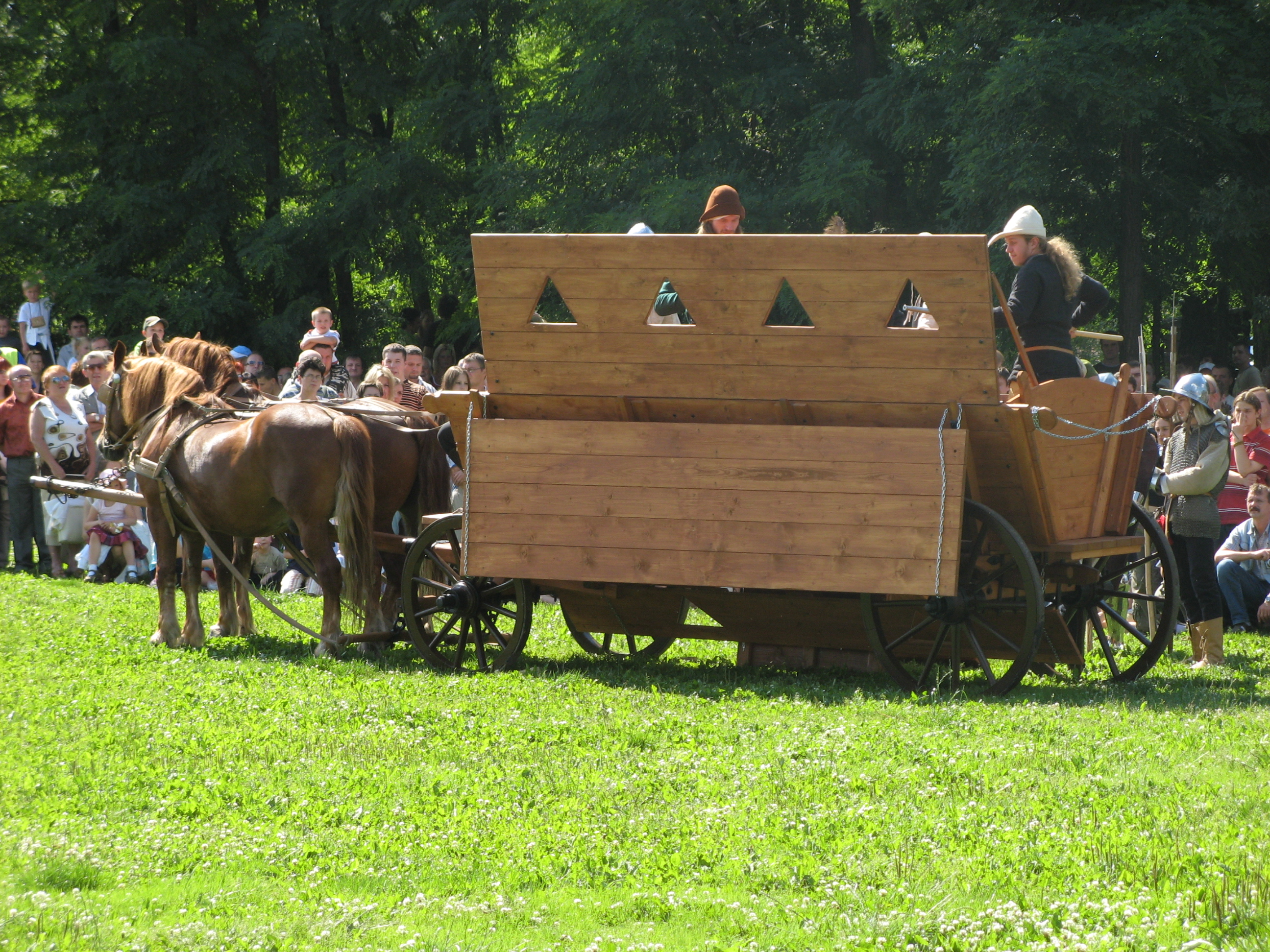
Modern reconstruction of Hussite war wagon

Hussite forces in Bohemia developed war wagons – medieval horse-drawn wagons that doubled as wagon forts – around 1420 during the Hussite Wars. These heavy wagons were given protective sides with firing slits; their heavy firepower came from either a cannon or from a force of hand-gunners and crossbowmen, supported by light cavalry and infantry using pikes and flails. Heavy arquebuses mounted on wagons were called arquebus à croc. These carried a ball of about 3.5 ounces (100 g).

==== Modern ====
By the end of World War II, most modern armies had vehicles to carry infantry, artillery and anti-aircraft weaponry. Most modern AFVs are superficially similar in design to their World War II counterparts, but with significantly better armour, weapons, engines, electronics, and suspension. The increase in the capacity of transport aircraft makes possible and practicable the transport of AFVs by air. Many armies are replacing some or all of their traditional heavy vehicles with lighter airmobile versions, often with wheels instead of tracks.

===== Armored road trains =====
In the spring of 1900 Lord Roberts ordered six armored road trains for use in South Africa; in December 1901 four armored road trains were delivered after testing. Each train was pulled by a John Fowler & Co steam tractor; with three armored wagons that could be used to carry troops and supplies. However these engines had their armor removed after being delivered, and were used by the Imperial Military Railway.

===== Armed and armoured car =====
The first modern AFVs were armed cars, dating back virtually to the invention of the motor car. The British inventor F. R. Simms designed and built the Motor Scout in 1898. It was the first armed, petrol-engine powered vehicle ever built. It consisted of a De Dion-Bouton quadracycle with a Maxim machine gun mounted on the front bar. An iron shield offered some protection for the driver from the front, but it lacked all-around protective armour.

The armoured car was the first modern fully armoured fighting vehicle. The first of these was the Simms's Motor War Car, also designed by Simms and built by Vickers, Sons & Maxim in 1899. The vehicle had Vickers armour 6 mm thick and was powered by a four-cylinder 3.3-litre 16 hp Cannstatt Daimler engine giving it a maximum speed of around 9 miles per hour (14 kilometres per hour). The armament, consisting of two Maxim guns, was carried in two turrets with 360° traverse.

Another early armoured car of the period was the French Charron, Girardot et Voigt 1902, presented at the Salon de l'Automobile et du cycle in Brussels, on 8 March 1902. The vehicle was equipped with a Hotchkiss machine gun, and with 7 mm armour for the gunner.

The Spanish Schneider-Brillié was the first armored vehicle to be used in combat, being first used in the Kert Campaign. The vehicle was equipped with two machineguns and built from a bus chassis.

Armored cars also saw limited use in the Italo-Turkish War.

Armoured cars were first used in large numbers on both sides during World War I as scouting vehicles.

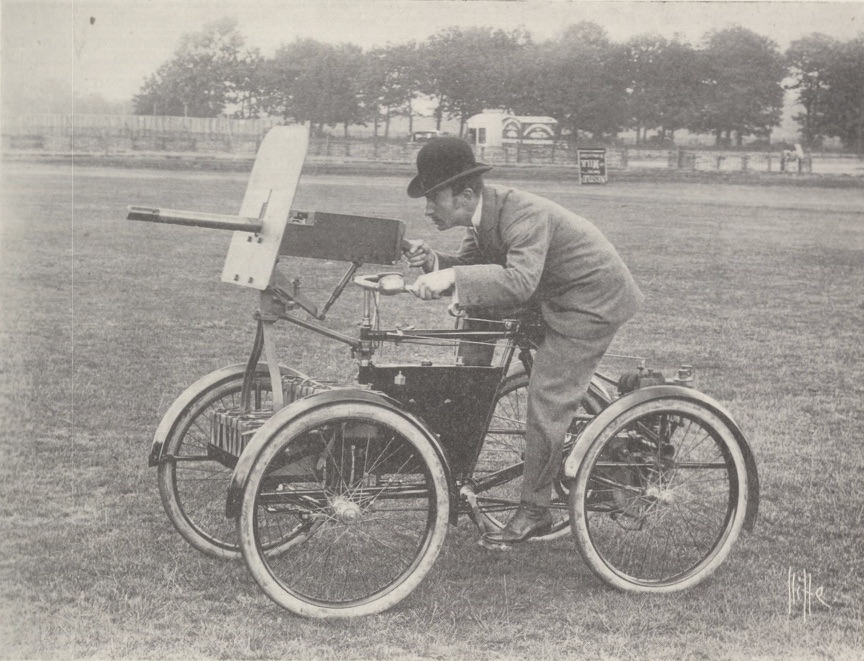
F. R. Simms's Motor Scout, built in 1898 as an armed car

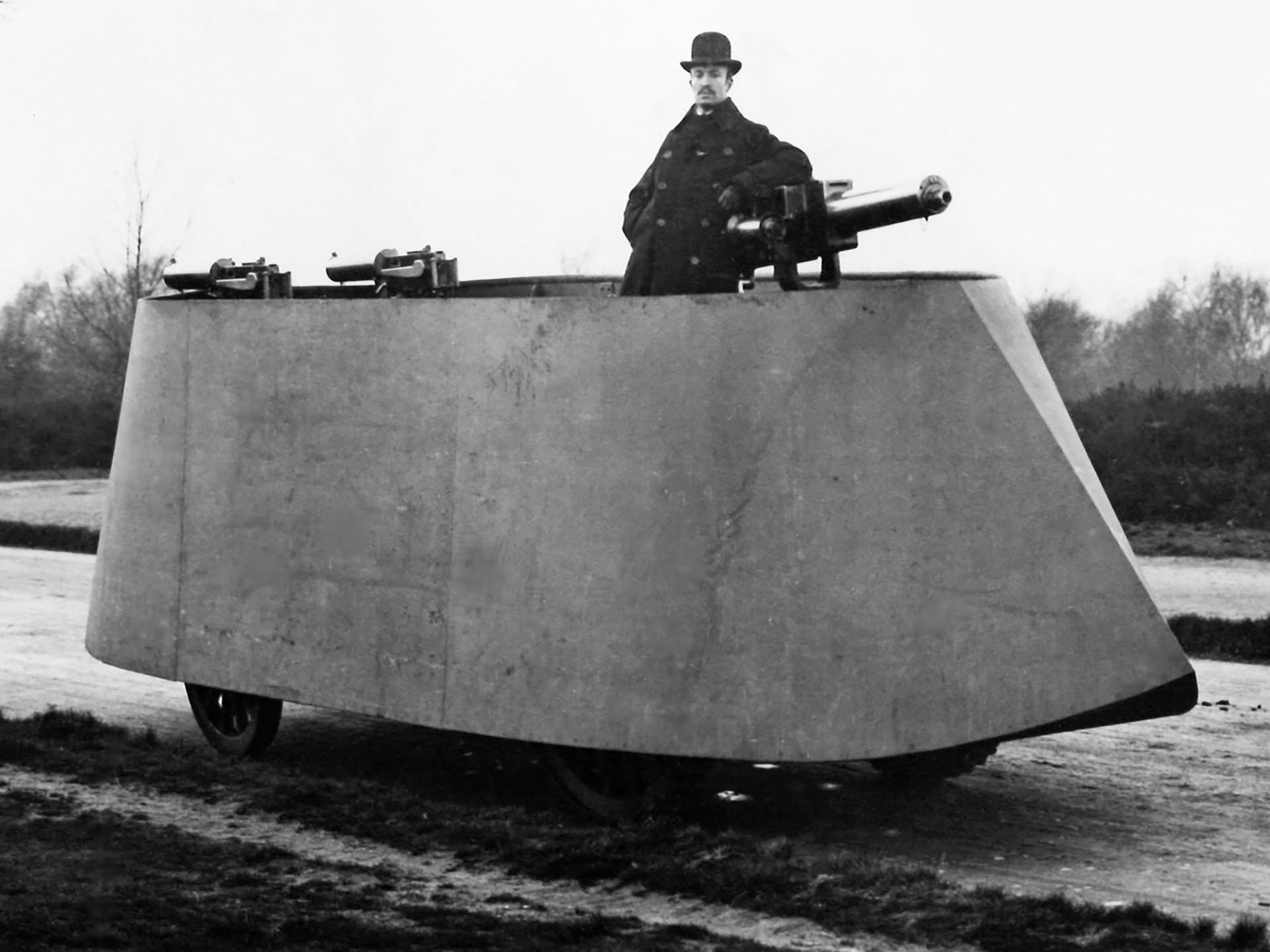
F. R. Simms's 1902 Motor War Car, the first armoured car to be built

===== Tank =====
In 1903, H. G. Wells published the short story "The Land Ironclads," positing indomitable war machines that would bring a new age of land warfare, the way steam-powered ironclad warships had ended the Age of Sail.

Wells's literary vision was realized in 1916, when, amidst the pyrrhic standstill of the Great War, the British Landship Committee deployed revolutionary armoured vehicles to break the stalemate. The tank was envisioned as an armoured machine that could cross ground under fire from machine guns and reply with its own mounted machine guns and naval artillery. These first British tanks of World War I moved on caterpillar tracks that had substantially lower ground pressure than wheeled vehicles, enabling them to pass the muddy, pocked terrain and slit trenches of the Battle of the Somme.

===== Troop transport =====
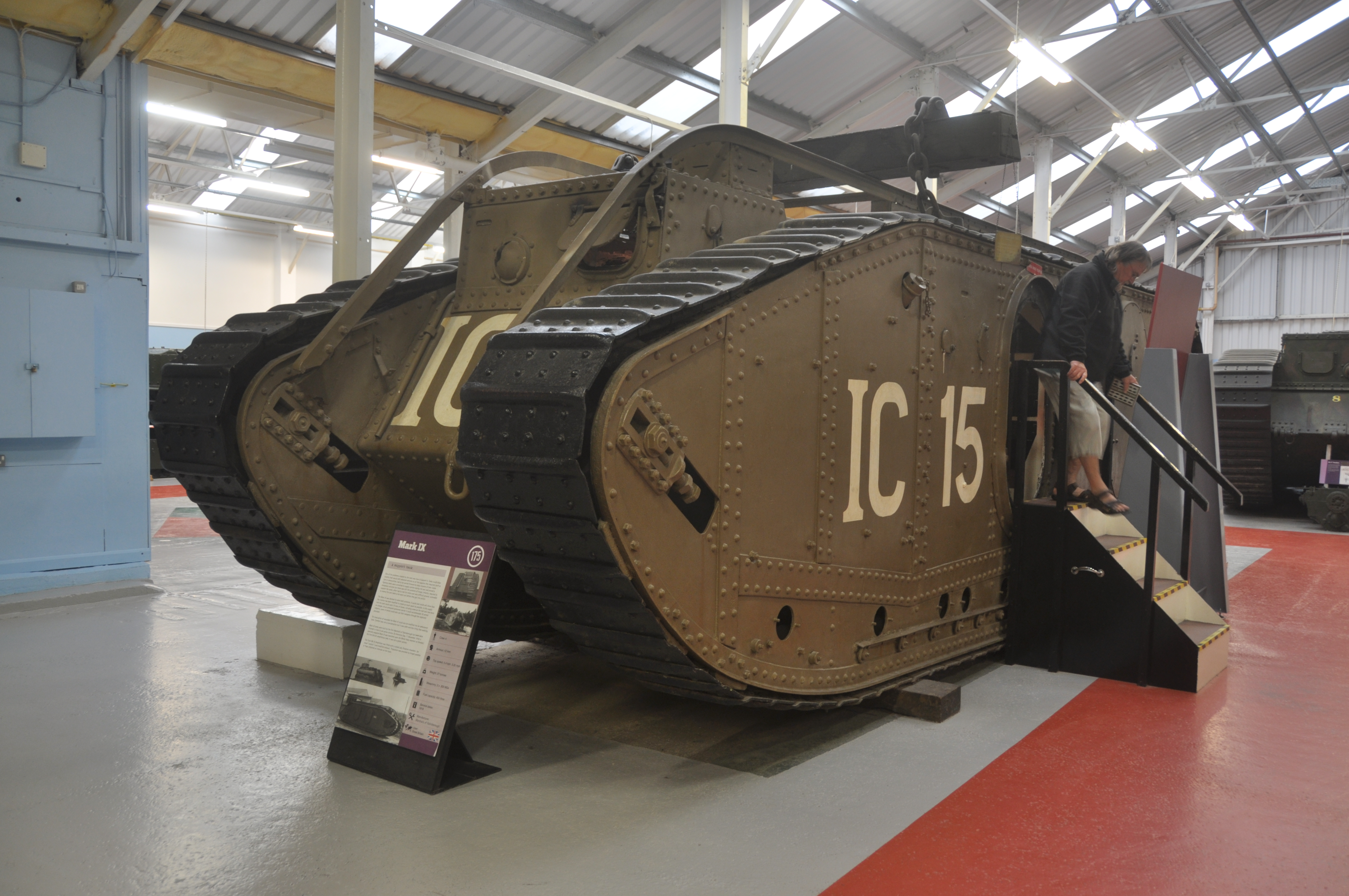
Mark IX tank, the first armoured personnel carrier, at the Tank Museum, Bovington

The tank eventually proved highly successful and, as technology improved, it became a weapon that could cross large distances at much higher speeds than supporting infantry and artillery. The need to provide the units that would fight alongside the tank led to the development of a wide range of specialised AFVs, especially during the Second World War (1939–1945).

The armoured personnel carrier, designed to transport infantry troops to the frontline, emerged towards the end of World War I. During the first actions with tanks, it had become clear that close contact with infantry was essential in order to secure ground won by the tanks. Troops on foot were vulnerable to enemy fire, but they could not be transported in the tank because of the intense heat and noxious atmosphere. In 1917, Lieutenant G. J. Rackham was ordered to design an armoured vehicle that could fight and carry troops or supplies. The Mark IX tank was built by Armstrong, Whitworth & Co., although just three vehicles had been finished at the time of the Armistice in November 1918, and only 34 were built in total.

===== Tankette =====
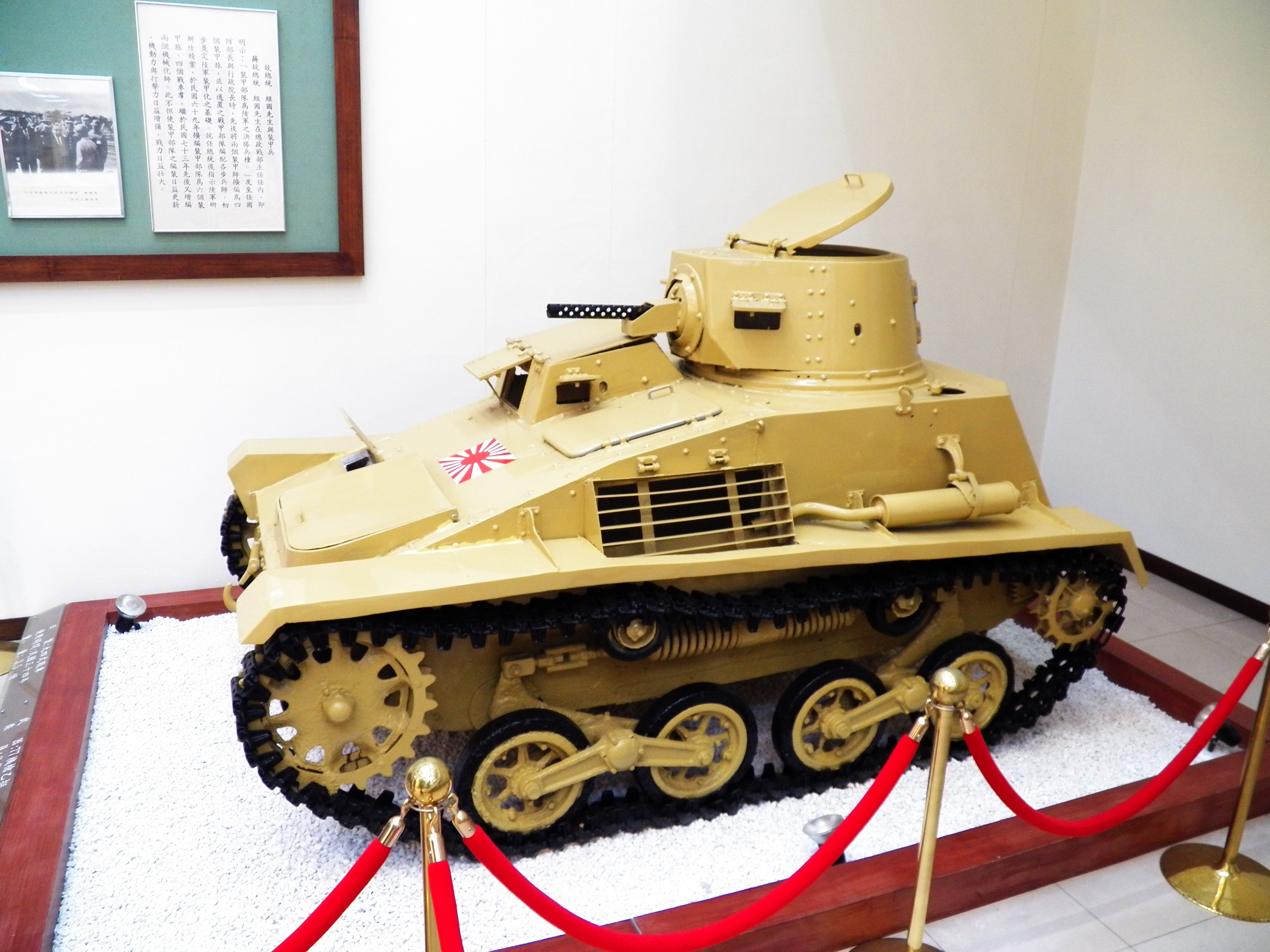
IJA Type 94 tankette at the Armor School History Museum

Different tank classifications emerged in the interwar period. The tankette was conceived as a mobile, two-man model, mainly intended for reconnaissance. In 1925, Sir John Carden and Vivian Loyd produced the first such design to be adopted – the Carden Loyd tankette. Tankettes saw use in the Royal Italian Army during the Italian invasion of Ethiopia (1935–1936), the Spanish Civil War (1936–1939), and during World War II. The Imperial Japanese Army used tankettes in China for infantry support, reconnaissance and later for jungle warfare.

===== Self-propelled artillery =====
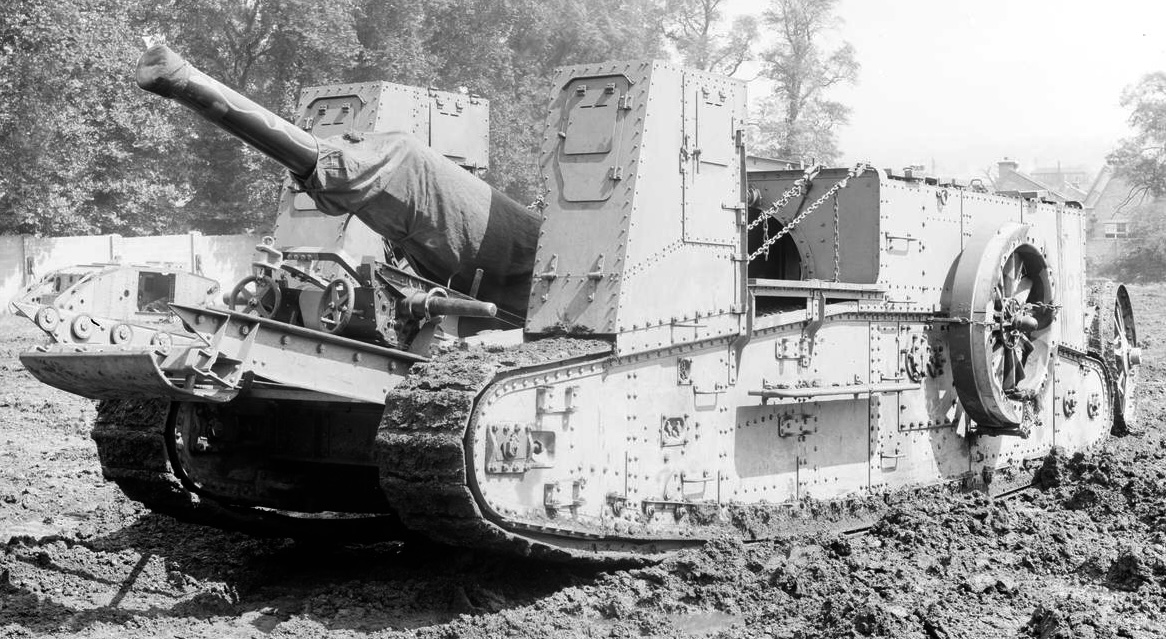
British Gun Carrier Mark I (60 pdr)

The British Gun Carrier Mark I, the first Self-propelled artillery, was fielded in 1917. It was based on the first tank, the British Mark I, and carried a heavy field-gun. The next major advance was the Birch gun (1925), developed for the British motorised warfare experimental brigade (the Experimental Mechanized Force). This mounted a field gun, capable of the usual artillery trajectories and even anti-aircraft use, on a tank chassis.

During World War II, most major military powers developed self-propelled artillery vehicles. These had guns mounted on a tracked chassis (often that of an obsolete or superseded tank) and provided an armoured superstructure to protect the gun and its crew. The first British design, "Bishop", carried the 25 pdr gun-howitzer in an extemporised mounting on a tank chassis that severely limited the gun's performance. It was replaced by the more effective Sexton. The Germans built many lightly armoured self-propelled anti-tank guns using captured French equipment (for example Marder I), their own obsolete light tank chassis (Marder II), or ex-Czech chassis (Marder III). These led to better-protected tank destroyers, built on a medium-tank chassis such as the Jagdpanzer IV or the Jagdpanther.

===== Anti-aircraft vehicle =====
The Self-propelled anti-aircraft weapon debuted in WWI. The British QF 3-inch 20 cwt was mounted on trucks for use on the Western Front. Although the Birch gun was a general purpose artillery piece on an armoured tracked chassis, it was capable of elevation for anti-aircraft use. Vickers Armstrong developed one of the first SPAAGs based on the chassis of the Mk.E 6-ton light tank/Dragon Medium Mark IV tractor, mounting a Vickers QF-1 "Pom-Pom" gun of 40 mm. The Germans fielded the Sd.Kfz. 10/4 and 6/2, cargo halftracks mounting single 20 mm or 37 mm AA guns (respectively) by the start of the war.

===== Self-propelled multiple rocket-launcher =====
Rocket launchers such as the Soviet Katyusha originated in the late 1930s. The Wehrmacht fielded self-propelled rocket artillery in World War II – the Panzerwerfer and Wurfrahmen 40 equipped half-track armoured fighting vehicles. Many modern multiple rocket launchers are self propelled by either truck or tank chassis.

==== Survivability ====
The level of armour protection between AFVs varies greatly – a main battle tank will normally be designed to take hits from other tank guns and anti-tank missiles, whilst light reconnaissance vehicles are often only armoured "just in case". Whilst heavier armour provides better protection, it makes vehicles less mobile (for a given engine power), limits its air-transportability, increases cost, uses more fuel and may limit the places it can go – for example, many bridges may be unable to support the weight of a main battle tank. A trend toward composite armour is taking the place of steel – composites are stronger for a given weight, allowing the tank to be lighter for the same protection as steel armour, or better protected for the same weight. Armour is being supplemented with active protection systems on a number of vehicles, allowing the AFV to protect itself from incoming projectiles.

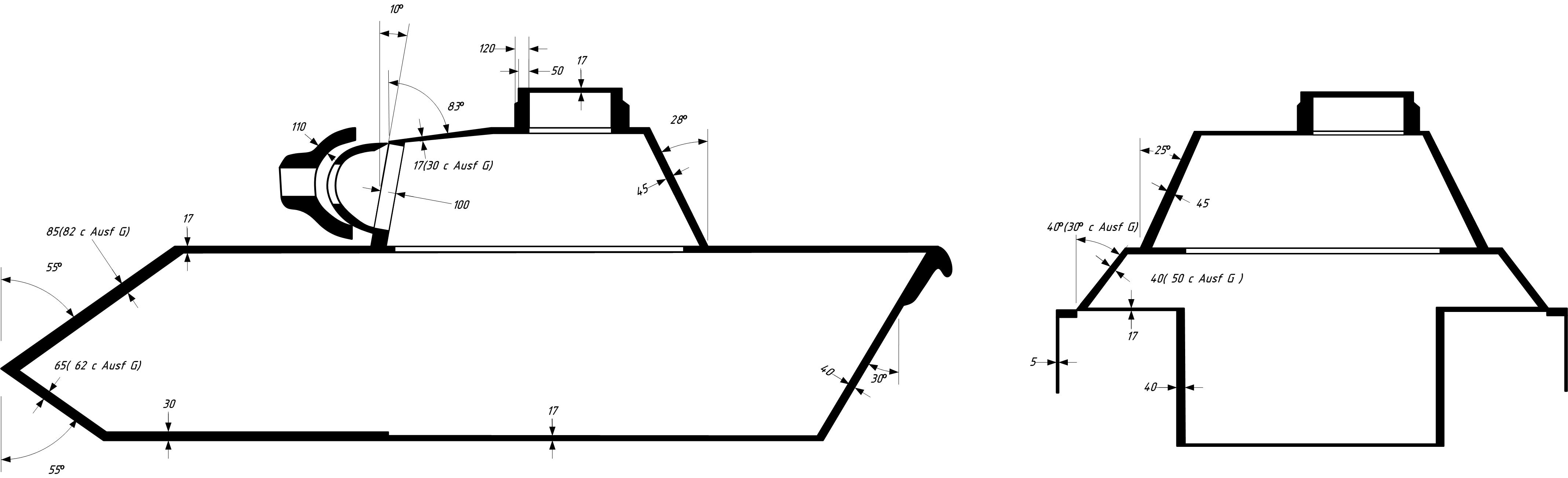
Armour-thickness chart for a Panther tank

The level of protection also usually varies considerably throughout the individual vehicle too, depending on the role of the vehicle and the likely direction of attack. For example, a main battle tank will usually have the heaviest armour on the hull front and the turret, lighter armour on the sides of the hull and the thinnest armour on the top and bottom of the tank. Other vehicles – such as the MRAP family – may be primarily armoured against the threat from IEDs and so will have heavy, sloped armour on the bottom of the hull.

In modern 21st century warfare, where satellites, drones, and mobile phones tend to erase the signature fog of war, survivability often is not about armor thickness, and instead is about time management. The shorter an AFV's signature window, the harder they are to disable.

==== Lethality ====
Weaponry varies by a very wide degree between AFVs – lighter vehicles for infantry carrying, reconnaissance or specialist roles may have only a autocannon or machine gun (or no armament at all), whereas heavy self-propelled artillery will carry howitzers, mortars or rocket launchers. These weapons may be mounted on a pintle, affixed directly to the vehicle or placed in a turret or cupola.

The greater the recoil of the weapon on an AFV, the larger the turret ring needs to be. A larger turret ring necessitates a larger vehicle. To avoid listing to the side, turrets on amphibious vehicles are usually located at the centre of the vehicle.

Grenade launchers may provide a versatile launch platform for a plethora of munitions including smoke, phosphorus, tear gas, illumination, anti-personnel, infrared and radar-jamming rounds.

Turret stabilization is an important capability because it enables firing on the move and prevents crew fatigue.

==== Maneuverability ====
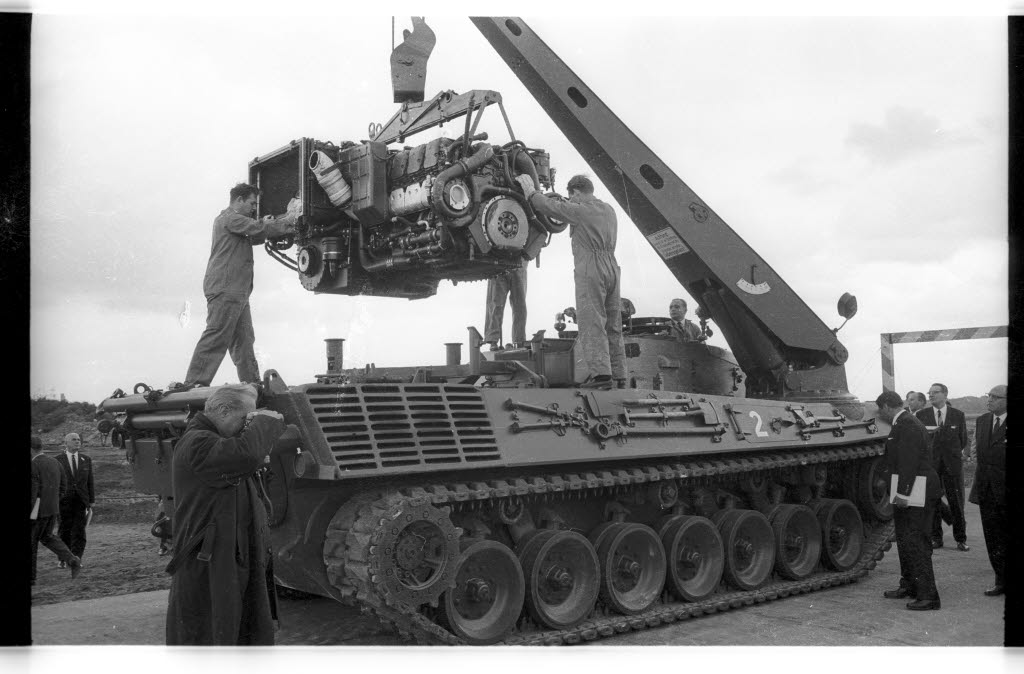
Engine replacement for a Bergepanzer 2

Modern AFVs have primarily used either petrol (gasoline) or diesel piston engines. More recently, gas turbines have been used. Most early AFVs used petrol engines, as they offer a good power-to-weight ratio. However, they fell out of favour during World War II due to the flammability of the fuel.

Most current AFVs are powered by a diesel engine; modern technology, including the use of turbo-charging, helps to overcome the lower power-to-weight ratio of diesel engines compared to petrol.

Gas turbine (turboshaft) engines offer a very high power-to-weight ratio and were starting to find favour in the late 20th century – however, they offer very poor fuel consumption and as such some armies are switching from gas turbines back to diesel engines (i.e. the Russian T-80 used a gas turbine engine, whereas the later T-90 does not). The US M1 Abrams is a notable example of a gas turbine powered tank.

== Modern classification by type and role ==
Notable armoured fighting vehicles extending from post-World War I to today.

=== Tank ===
The tank is an all terrain AFV incorporating artillery which is designed to fill almost all battlefield roles and to engage enemy forces by the use of direct fire in the frontal assault role. Though several configurations have been tried, particularly in the early experimental "golden days" of tank development, a standard, mature design configuration has since emerged to a generally accepted pattern. This features a main tank gun or artillery gun, mounted in a fully rotating turret atop a tracked automotive hull, with various additional secondary weapon systems throughout.

Philosophically, the tank is, by its very nature, an offensive weapon. Being a protective encasement with at least one gun position, it is essentially a pillbox or small fortress (though these are static fortifications of a purely defensive nature) that can move toward the enemy – hence its offensive utility. Psychologically, the tank is a force multiplier that has a positive morale effect on the infantry it accompanies. It also instills fear in the opposing force who can often hear and even feel their arrival.

==== Tank classifications ====
Tanks were classified either by size or by role.

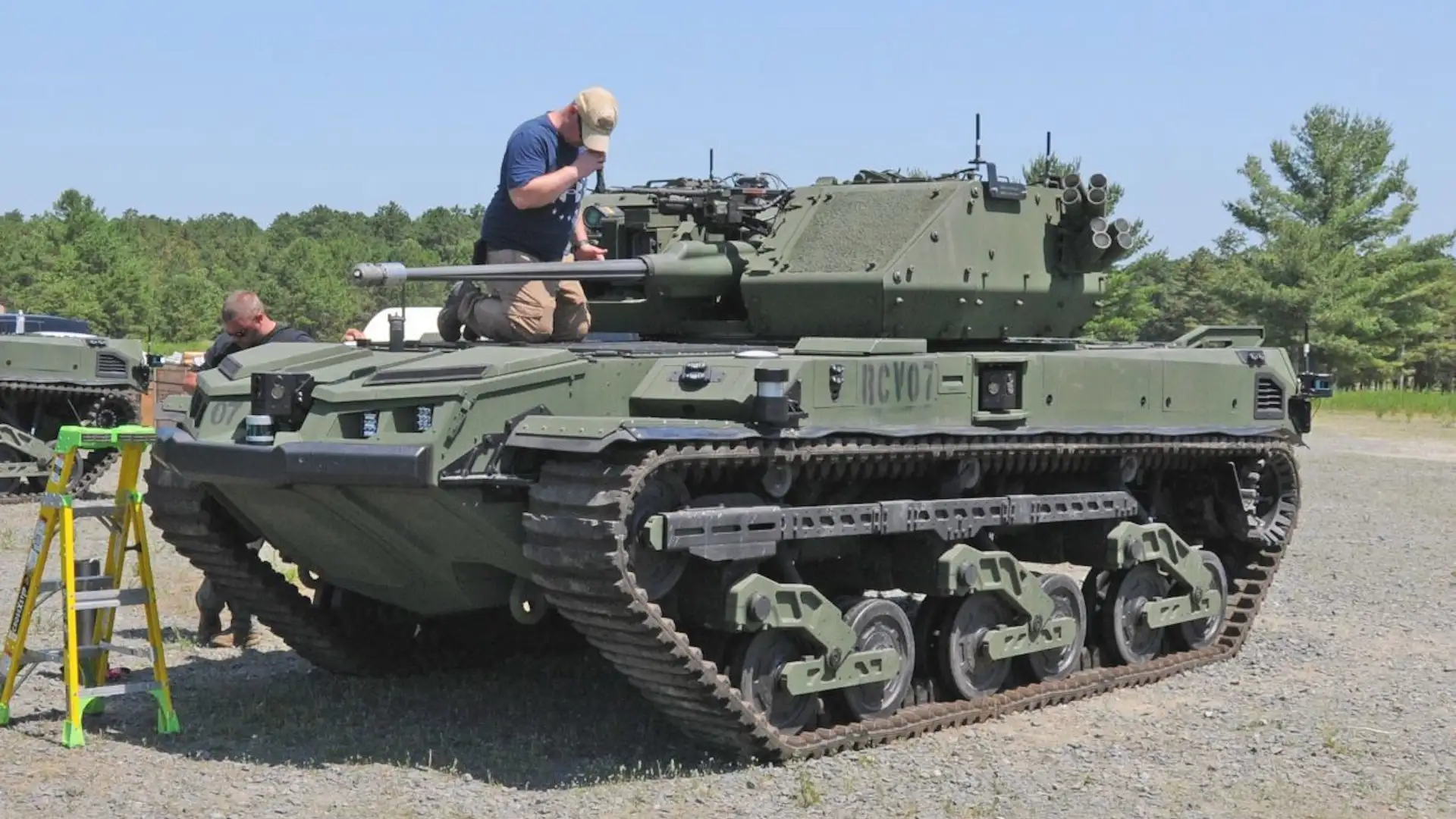
Ripsaw M5 unmanned light tank

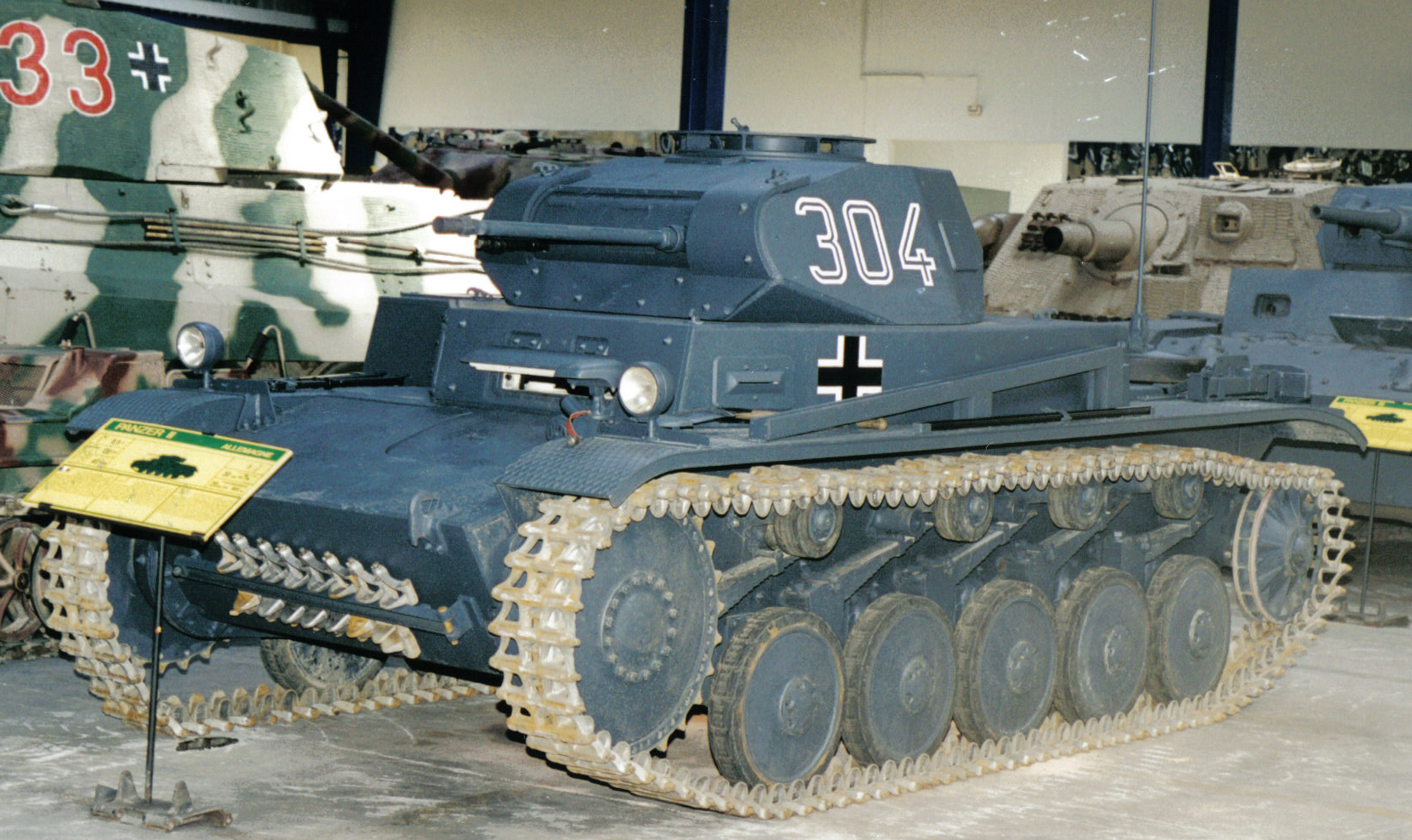
A WWII German Panzer II light tank

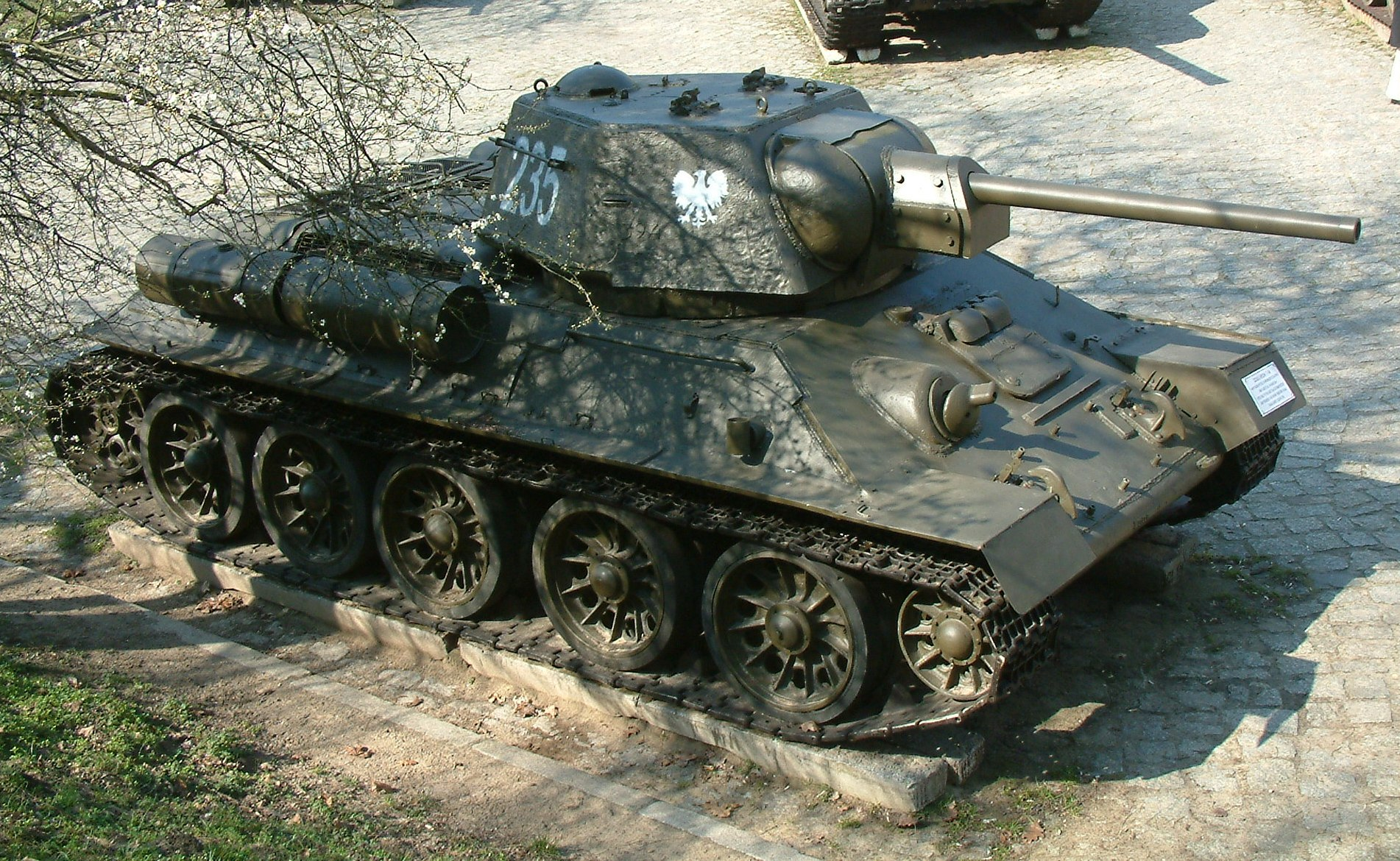
Soviet-made Polish T-34 medium tank Model 1942 in Poznań, Poland. The model 1942's hexagonal turret distinguishes it from earlier models.

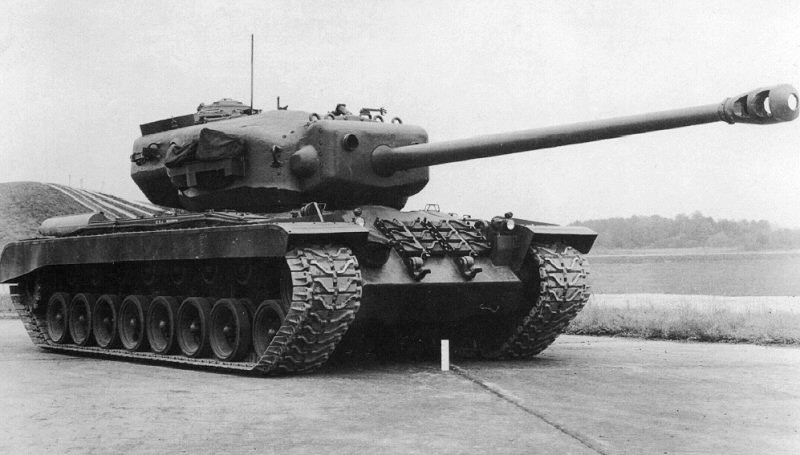
American T29 Heavy Tank

Classification by relative size was common, as this also tended to influence the tanks' role.

- Light tanks are smaller tanks with thinner armour and lower-powered guns, allowing for better tactical mobility, amphibious and airdrop options, and ease of strategic transport. These are intended for armoured reconnaissance, skirmishing, artillery observation, expeditionary warfare and supplementing airborne or naval landings. Light tanks are typically cheaper to build and maintain, but fare poorly against heavier tanks. They may be held in reserve for exploiting any breakthroughs in enemy lines, with the goal of disrupting communications and supply lines. The light tank concept emerged during World War I with the French Renault ft17.
- Medium tanks are mid-sized tanks with adequate armour and guns, and fair mobility, allowing for a balance of fighting abilities, mobility, cost-effectiveness, and transportability. Medium tanks are effective in groups when used against enemy tanks. More cost effective and easier to produce than heavier tanks they excelled in various combat roles.
- Heavy tanks are larger tanks with thick armour and more powerful guns, but less mobile and more difficult to transport. They were intended to be overmatch for typical enemy medium tanks, easily penetrating their armour while being much less susceptible to their attacks. Heavy tanks cost more to both build and maintain, and their heavy armour proved most effective when deployed in support infantry assaulting entrenched fortifications. The concept of heavy tanks began in World War I with the British MK1 a large vehicle intended to breach enemy trenches.

Over time, tanks tended to be designed with heavier armour and weapons, increasing the weight of all tanks, so these classifications are relative to the average for the nation's tanks for any given period. An older tank design might be reclassified over time, such as a tank being first deployed as a medium tank, but in later years relegated to light tank roles.

Tanks were designated as Male tank (cannons) or Female tank (machine guns) based on their armament to enable them to operate in teams. Male tanks had six-pounder cannons to destroy fortifications, while female tanks were equipped with only machine guns to defend against infantry. The two types were designed to operate together, with male tanks leading to breach enemy lines and female tanks following to suppress enemy infantry. The introduction of the Hermaphrodite tank (Composite) and Whippet showed a need for tanks to handle multiple roles, leading to universal designs like the Mark VIII (International Tank), though the focus eventually shifted away from giant, slow tanks towards faster, more versatile models after WWI.

Tanks were also classified by roles that were independent of size, such as cavalry tank, cruiser tank, fast tank, infantry tank, "assault" tank, or "breakthrough" tank. Military theorists initially tended to assign tanks to traditional military infantry, cavalry, and artillery roles, but later developed more specialized roles unique to tanks.

In modern use, the heavy tank and tank destroyer has fallen out of favour, being supplanted by more heavily armed and armoured descendant of the medium tanks – the universal main battle tank. The light tank role has been taken over by Infantry Fighting Vehicles, MRAPS, or lost favour to cheaper, faster, lighter armoured cars; however, light tanks (or similar vehicles with other names) are still in service with a number of forces as reconnaissance vehicles, most notably the Russian Marines with the PT-76, the British Army with the Scimitar, and the Chinese Army with the Type 63.

==== Main battle tank ====
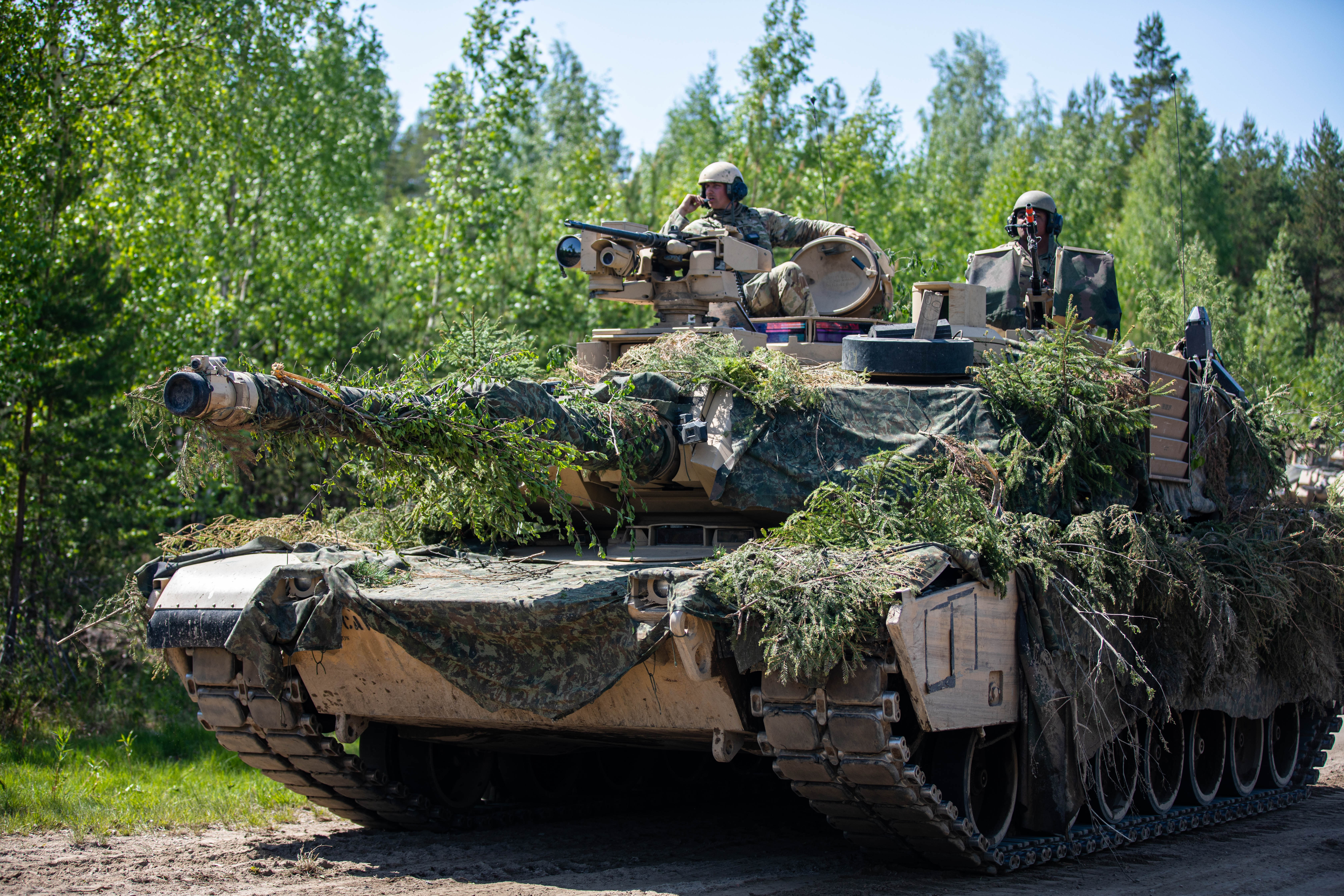
United States third-generation M1 Abrams tank

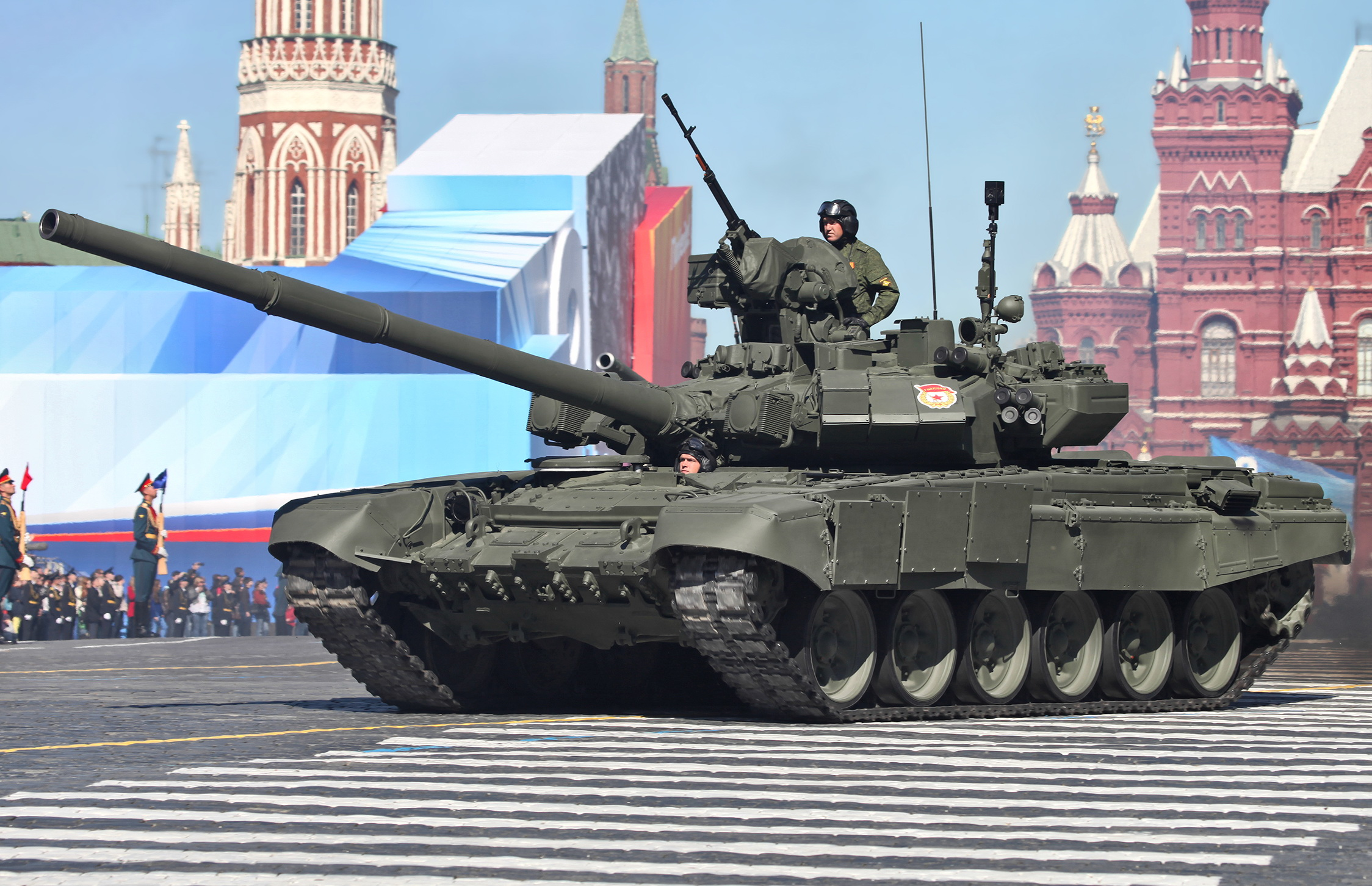
Russian T-90 main battle tank with 2A46 smoothbore gun

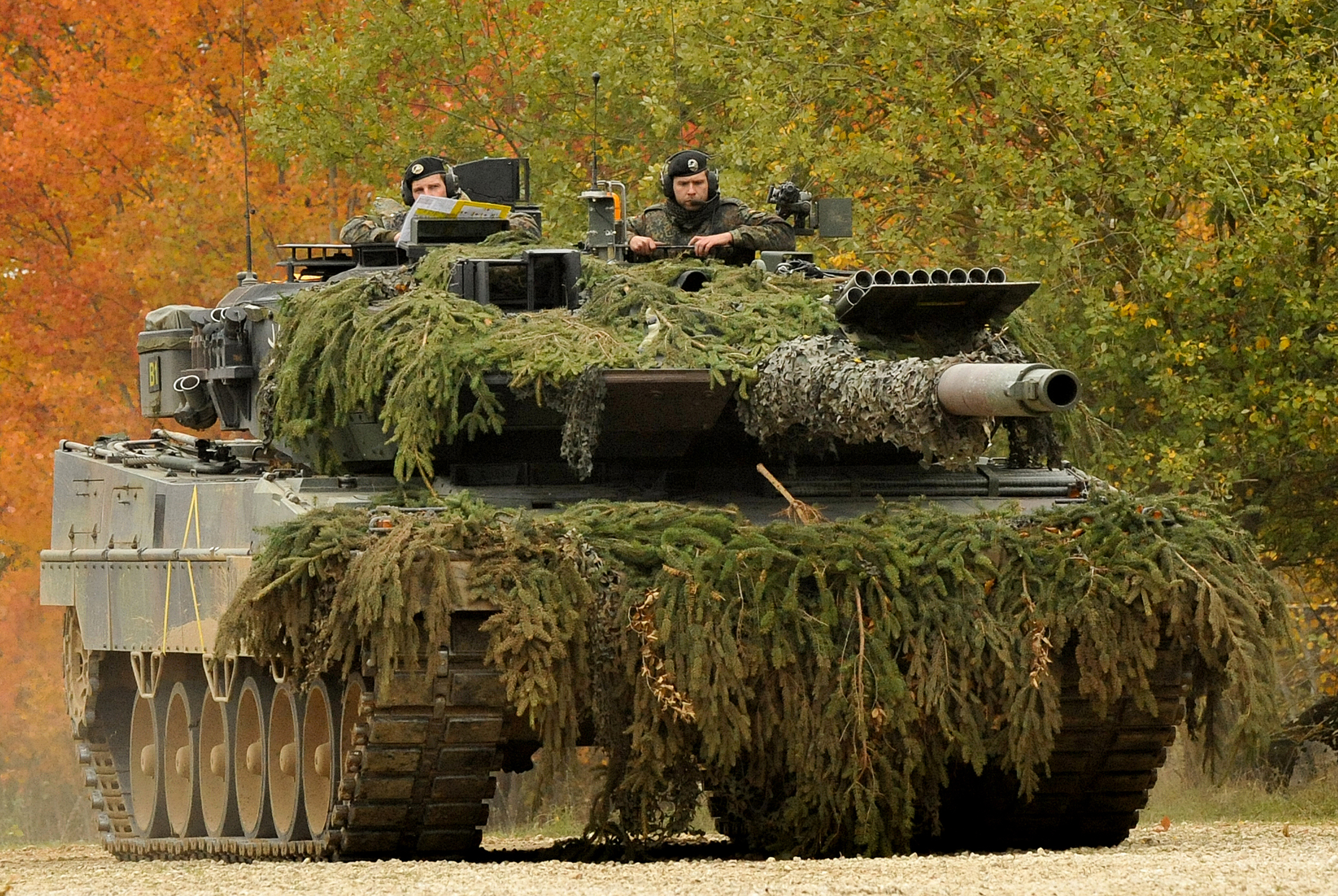
Modern Germany Leopard 2 main battle tank

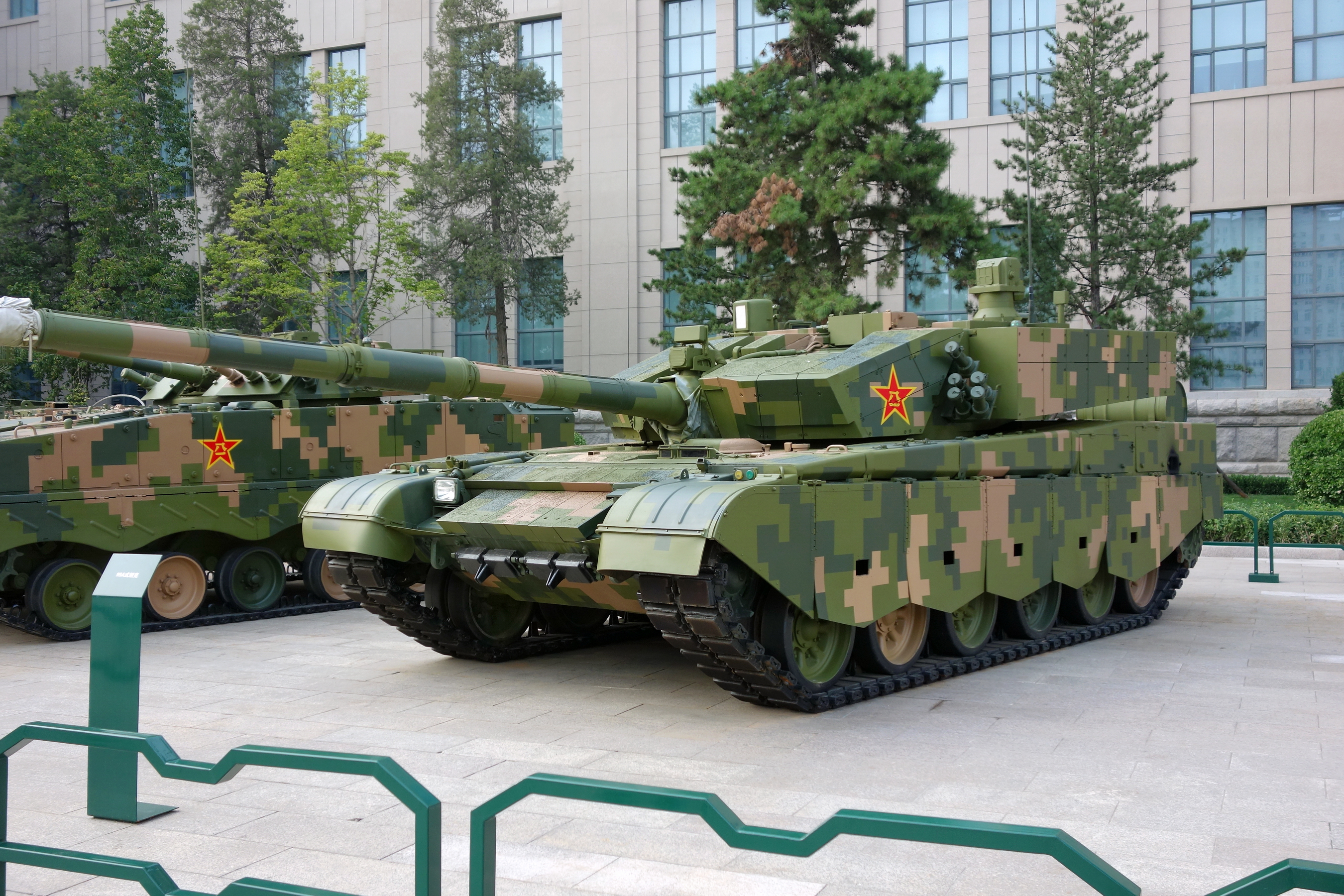
Chinese Type 99 main battle tank

Modern main battle tanks or "universal tanks" incorporate recent advances in automotive, artillery, armour, and electronic technology to combine the best characteristics of the historic medium and heavy tanks into a single, all-around type. They are also the most expensive to mass-produce. A main battle tank is distinguished by its high level of firepower, mobility and armour protection relative to other vehicles of its era. It can cross comparatively rough terrain at high speeds, but its heavy dependency on fuel, maintenance, and ammunition makes it logistically demanding. It has the heaviest armour of any AFVs on the battlefield, and carries a powerful precision-guided munition weapon systems that may be able to engage a wide variety of both ground targets and air targets.

Up to the 1960s, countries would deploy Light and Heavy Tanks alongside their MBTs, with Heavy Tanks mounting 120mm guns and armour. But, as the MBTs started to mount compact but powerful guns, while gaining light, composite armour that outperformed the heavy tanks, the heavy tank classification slowly ceased to exist. The MBT also had an effect on Tank Destroyers; the classic tank destroyer died with the heavy tank, as the MBT could mount a big gun and heavy armour without sacrificing the turret, and MBTs were capable anti-tank platforms. Despite advances in anti-tank warfare, MBTs relevancy as steadily increased and still remains a versatile land-based weapon-systems of the 21st-century, valued for its adaptability, shock action and high survivability.

==== Tankette ====
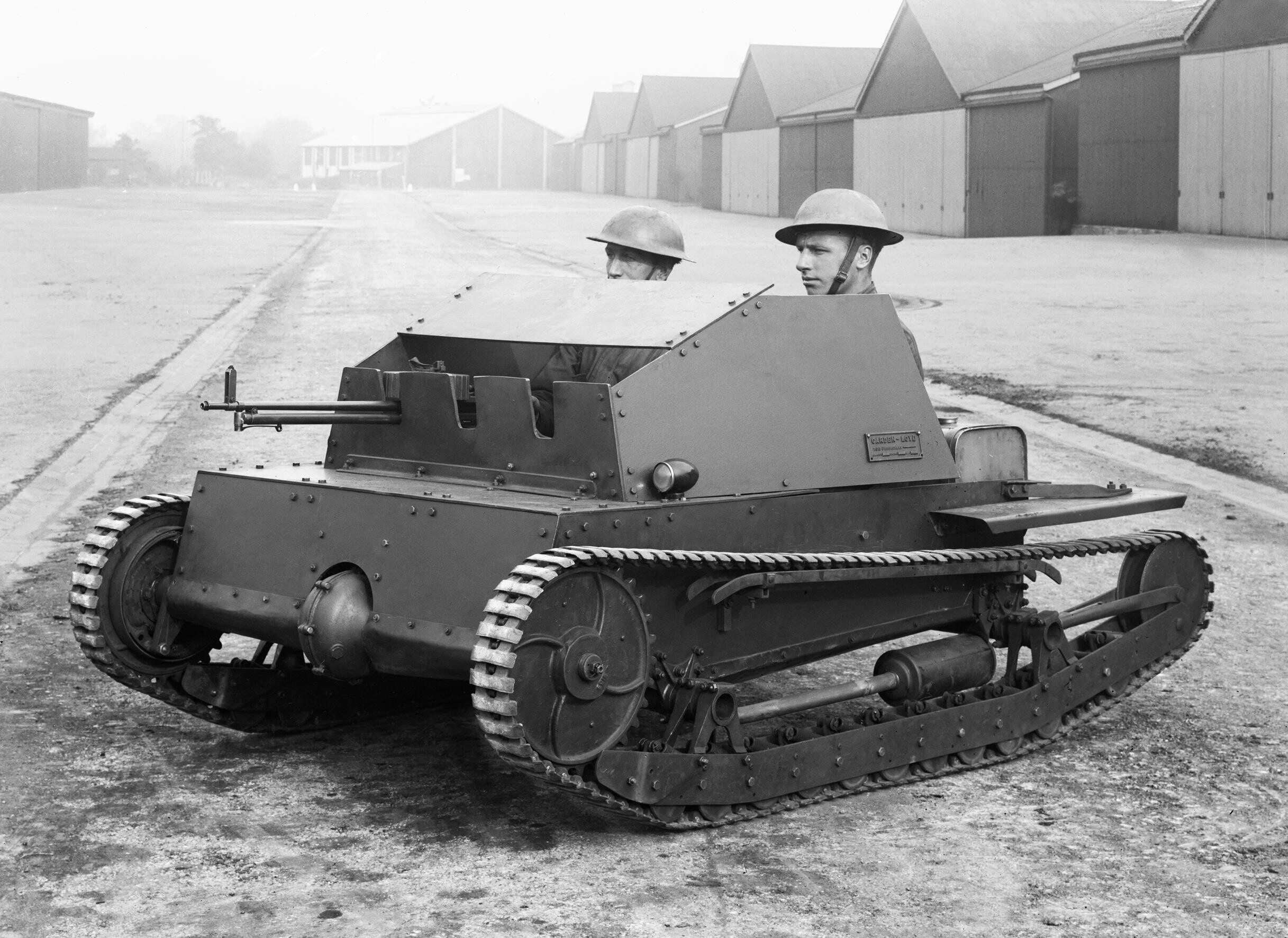
The Carden-Loyd tankette concept was adopted by many armies.

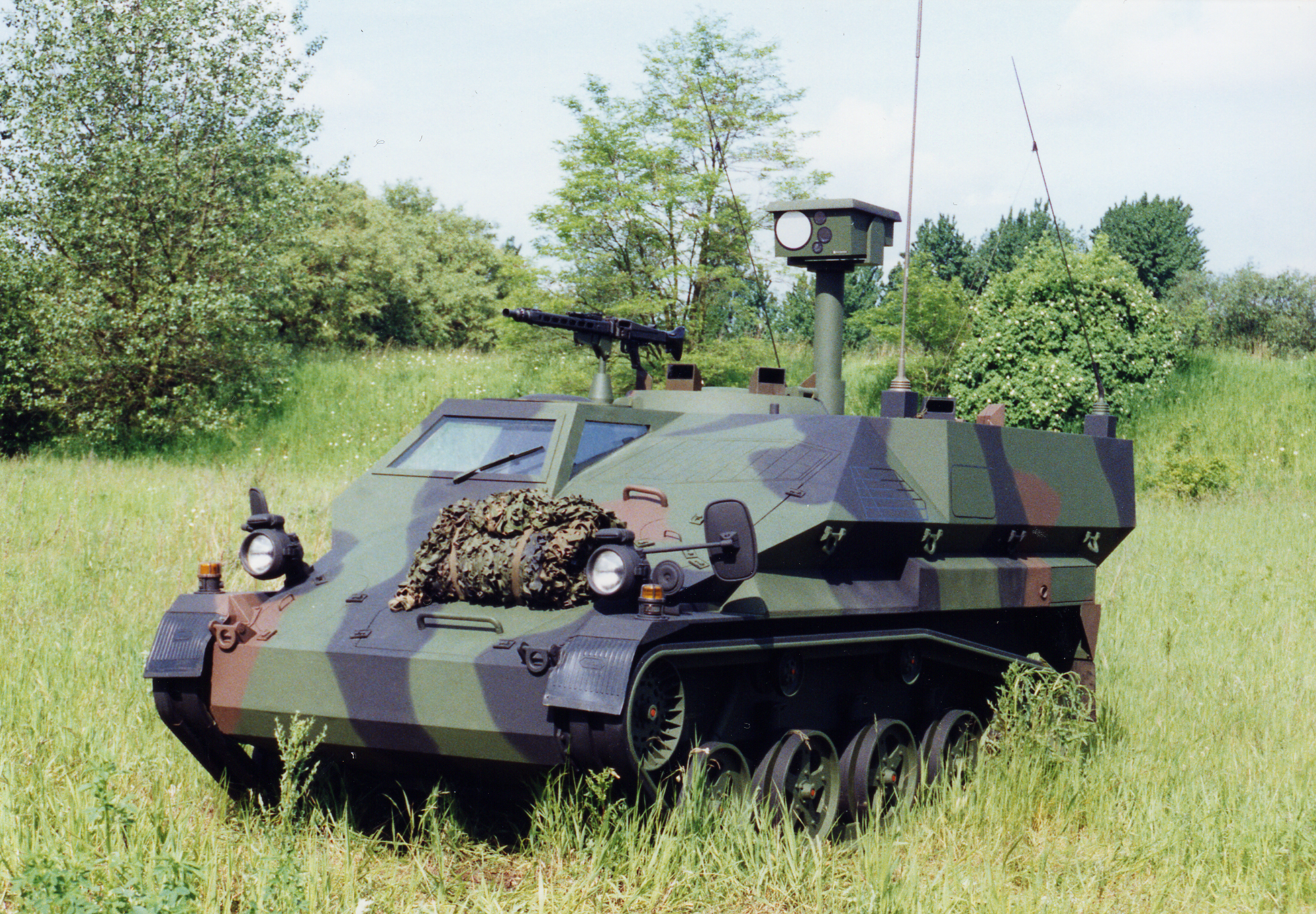
Wiesel 2 Argus scout tankette

A tankette is a tracked armed and armoured vehicle resembling a small "ultra-light tank" or "super-light tank" roughly the size of a car, mainly intended for light infantry support or scouting. Tankettes were introduced in the mid-1920s as a reconnaissance vehicle and a mobile machine gun position. They were one or two-man vehicles armed with a machine gun. Colloquially it may also simply mean a "small tank".

Tankettes were designed and built by several nations between the 1920s and 1940s following the British Carden Loyd tankette which was a successful implementation of "one man tank" ideas from Giffard Le Quesne Martel, a British Army engineer. They were very popular with smaller countries. Some saw some combat (with limited success) in World War II. However, the vulnerability of their light armour eventually caused the concept to be abandoned. However, the German Army uses a modern design of air-transportable armoured weapons carriers, the Wiesel AWC, which resembles the concept of a tankette.

==== Super-heavy tank ====
The term "super-heavy tank" has been used to describe armoured fighting vehicles of extreme size, generally over 75 tonnes. Programs have been initiated on several occasions with the aim of creating an invincible siegeworks/breakthrough vehicle for penetrating enemy formations and fortifications without fear of being destroyed in combat. Examples were designed in World War I and World War II (such as the Panzer VIII Maus), along with a few in the Cold War. Despite their ambitious designs remain largely experimental; few working prototypes were built and there is no clear evidence any of these vehicles saw combat, as their immense size would have made most designs impractical.

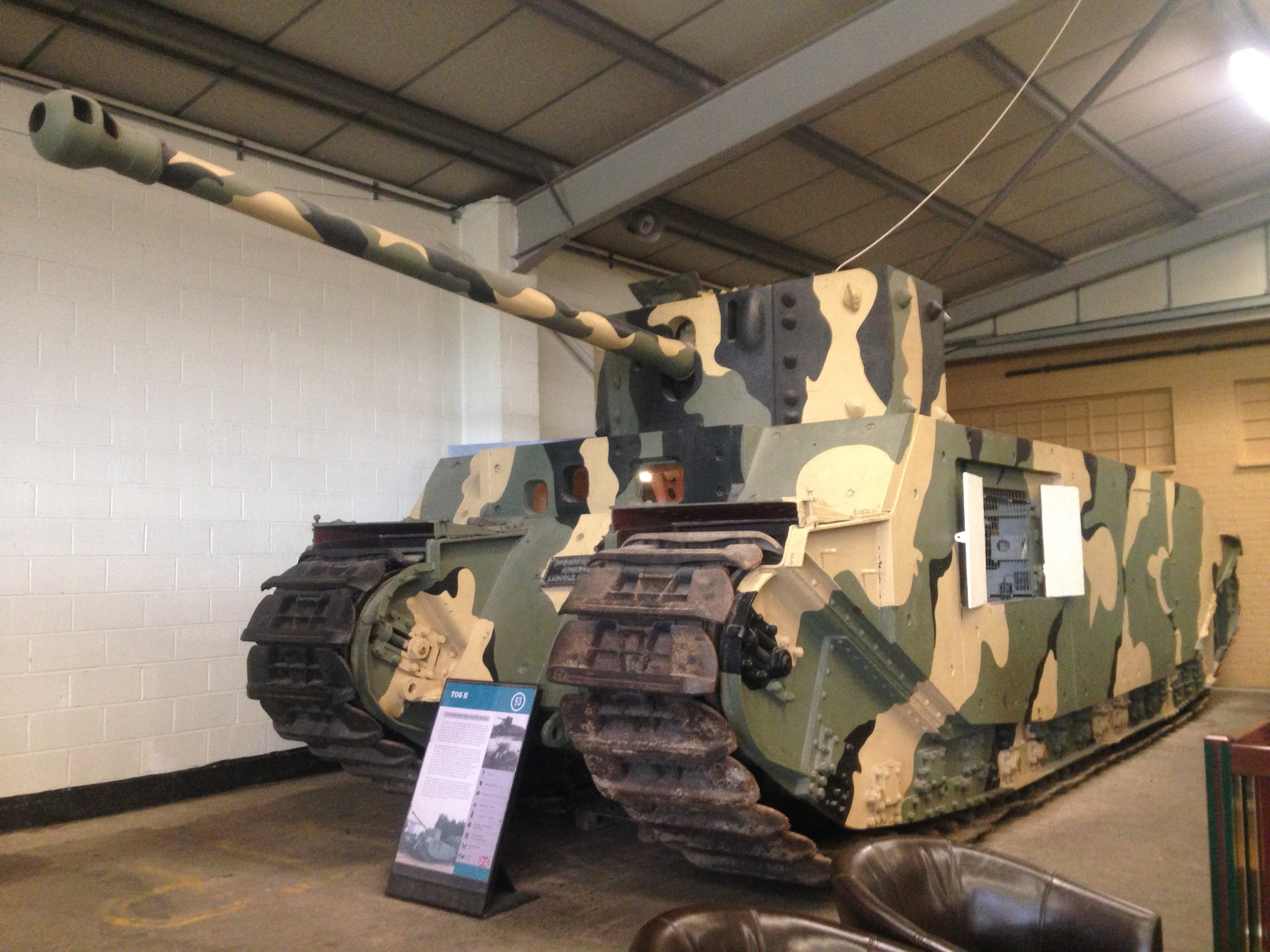
British TOG II from the Tank Museum

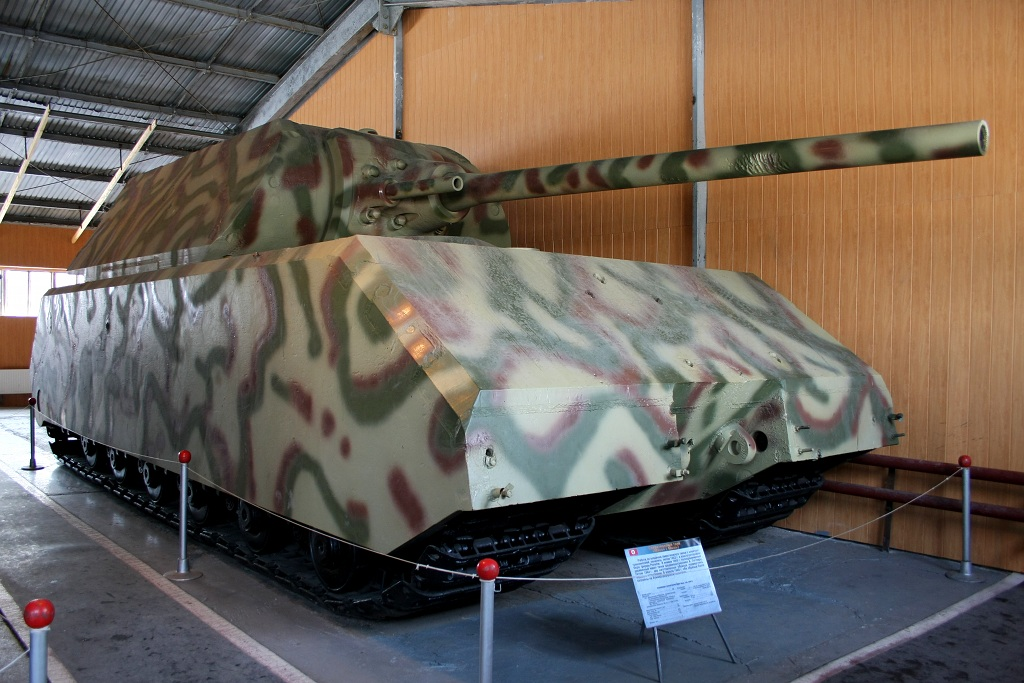
German Panzer VIII Maus in the Kubinka Tank Museum in Russia

==== Missile tank ====
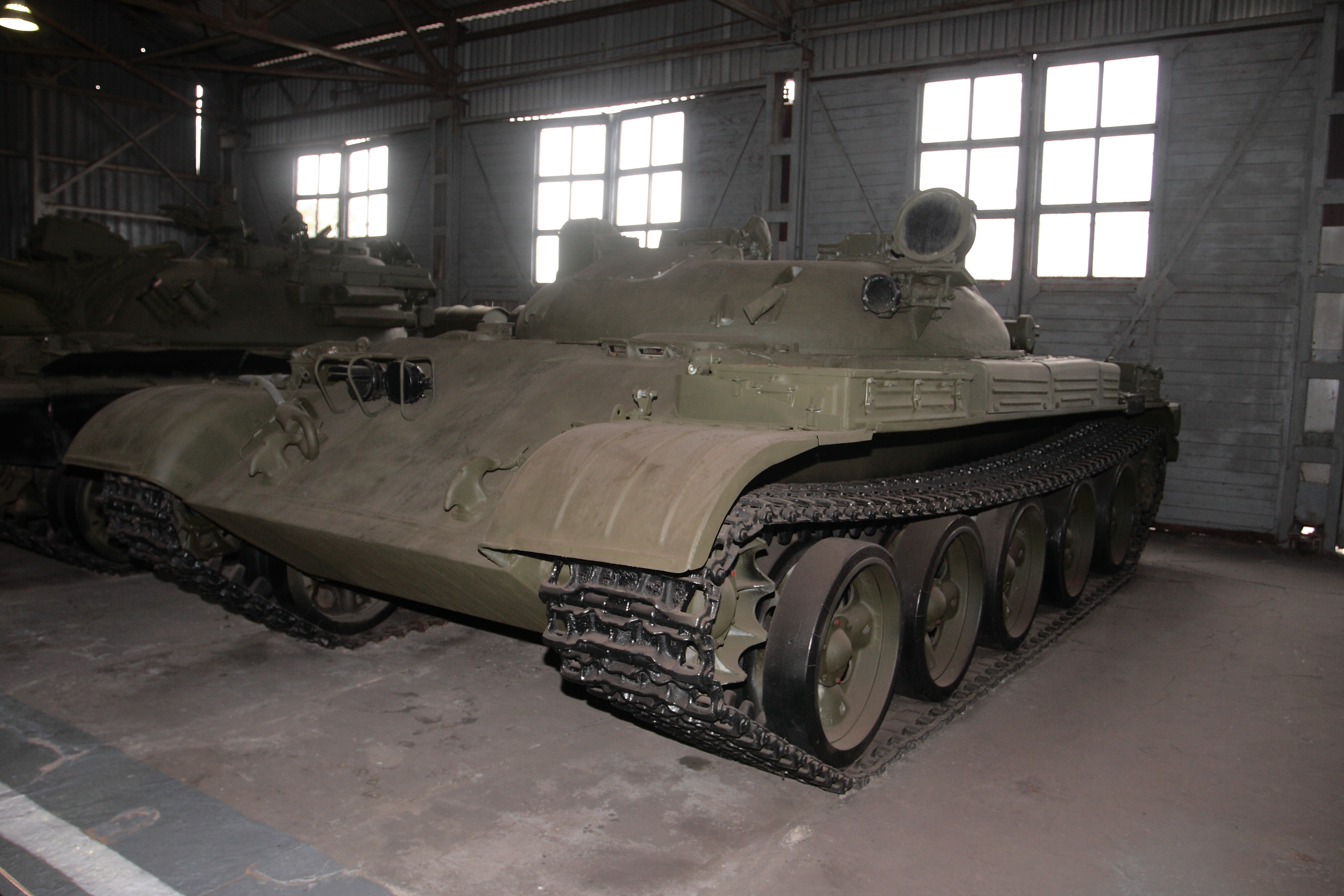
Soviet IT-1, Kubinka Tank Museum

A missile tank is a tank fulfilling the role of a main battle tank, but using only anti-tank surface-to-surface missiles for main armament. Several nations have experimented with prototypes, notably the Soviet Union during the tenure of Nikita Khrushchev (projects Object 150 (IT-1) Object 167, Object 137Ml, Object 155Ml, Object 287, Object 775),

==== Flame tank ====
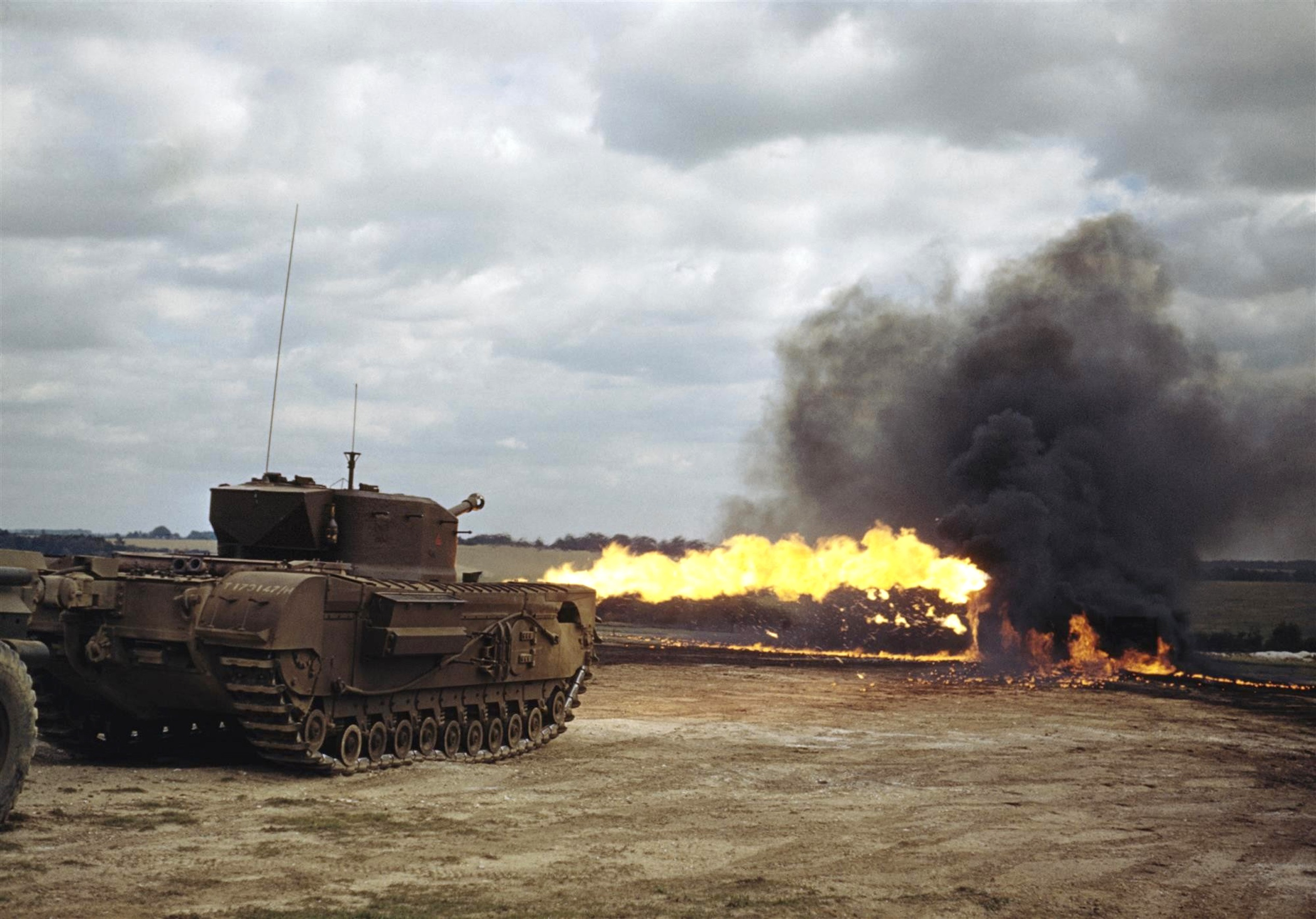
British Churchill Crocodile flame tank

A flame tank is an otherwise-standard tank equipped with a flamethrower, most commonly used to supplement combined arms attacks against fortifications, confined spaces, or other obstacles. The type only reached significant use in the Second World War, during which the United States, Soviet Union, Germany, Italy, Japan and the United Kingdom (including members of the British Commonwealth) all produced flamethrower-equipped tanks. Usually, the flame projector replaced one of the tank's machineguns, however, some flame projectors replaced the tank's main gun. Fuel for the flame weapon was generally carried inside the tank, although a few designs mounted the fuel externally, such as the armoured trailer used on the Churchill Crocodile.

Flame tanks have been superseded by thermobaric weapons, such as the Russian TOS-1, which provide greater efficiency and safety.

==== Infantry tank ====
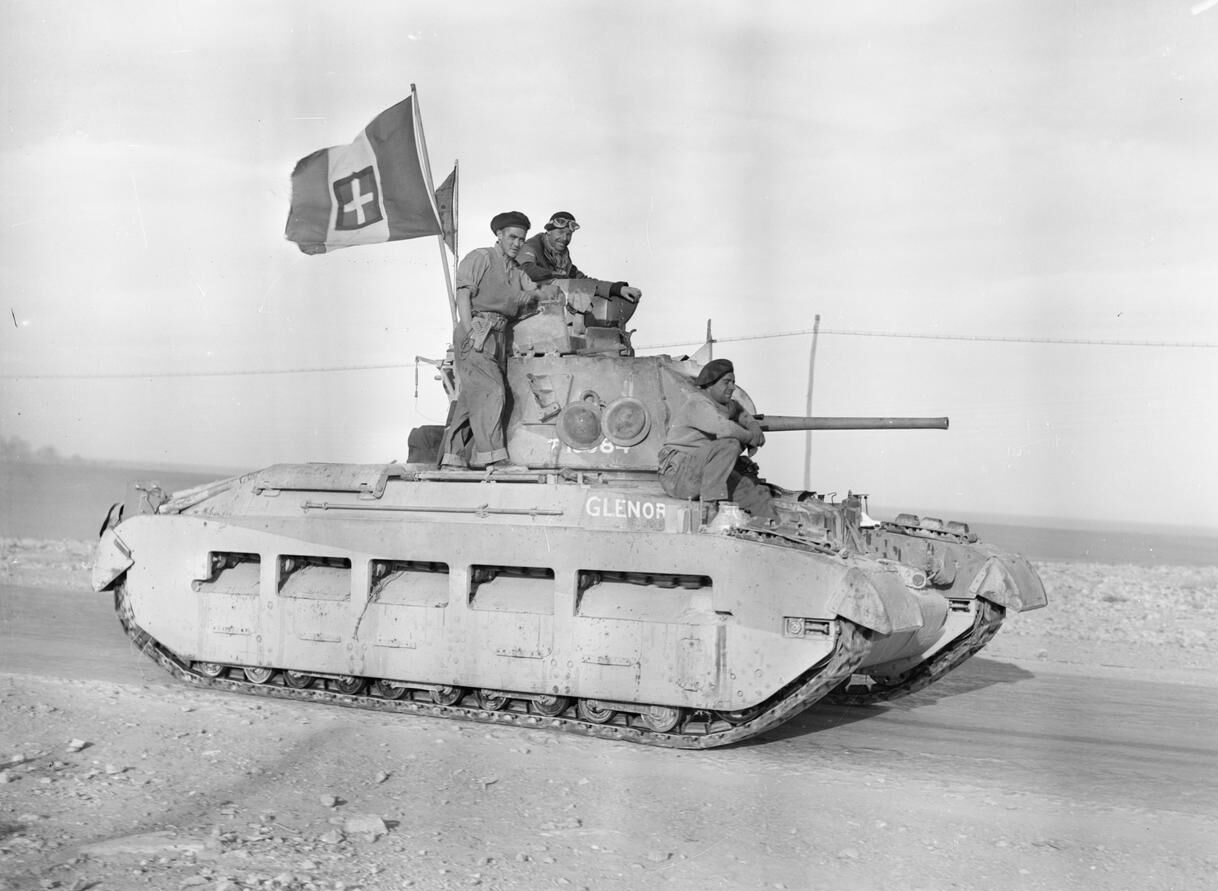
A British Matilda tank displaying a captured Italian flag

The idea for this tank was developed during World War I by British and French. The infantry tank was designed to work in concert with infantry in the assault, moving mostly at a walking pace, and carrying heavy armour to survive defensive fire. Its main purpose was to suppress enemy fire, crush obstacles such as barbed-wire entanglements, and served as a shield for infantry on their advance into and through enemy lines by giving mobile overwatch and cover. The French Renault FT was the first iteration of this concept. The British and French retained the concept between the wars and into the Second World War era. Because infantry tanks did not need to be fast, they could carry heavy armour. One of the best-known infantry tanks was the Matilda II of World War II. Other examples include the French R-35, the British Valentine, and the British Churchill.

By the end of World War II the development of faster and more versatile tanks, like the British Centurion, which could perform both Infantry and Cruiser roles, rendered the Infantry tank concept obsolete.

==== Cruiser tank ====
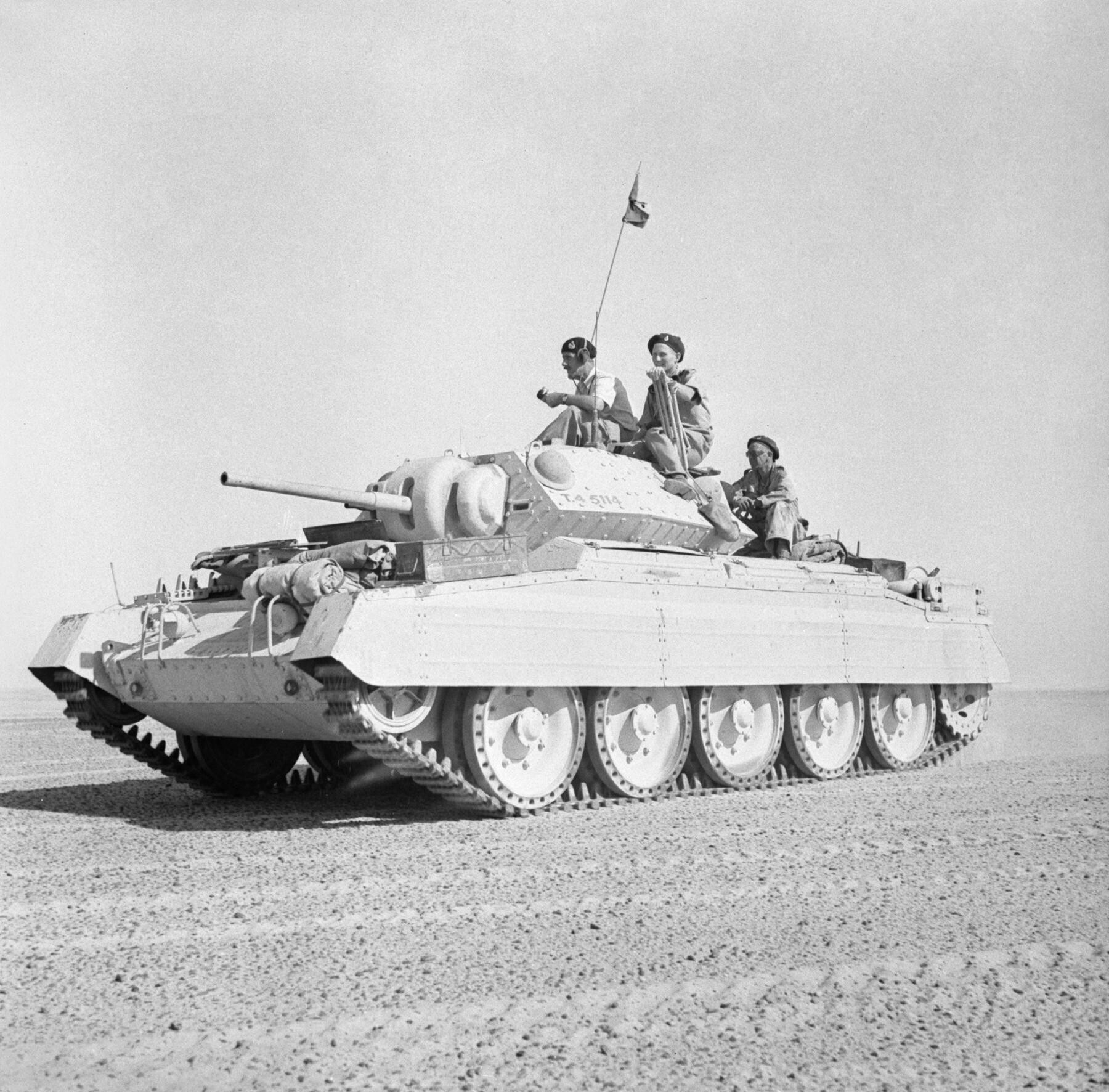
2 pdr-armed Crusader tank in the desert

A cruiser tank, or cavalry tank, was designed to move fast and exploit penetrations of the enemy front. The idea originated in "Plan 1919", a British plan to break the trench deadlock of World War I in part via the use of high-speed tanks. The first cruiser tank was the British Whippet. Between the wars, this concept was implemented in the "fast tanks" pioneered by J. Walter Christie. These led to the Soviet BT tank series and the British cruiser tank series.

During World War II, British cruiser tanks were designed to complement infantry tanks, exploiting gains made by the latter to attack and disrupt the enemy rear areas. In order to give them the required speed, cruiser designs sacrificed armour and armament compared to the infantry tanks. Pure British cruisers were generally replaced by more capable medium tanks such as the US Sherman and, to a lesser extent, the Cromwell by 1943.

The Soviet fast tank (bistrokhodniy tank, or BT tank) classification also came out of the infantry/cavalry concept of armoured warfare and formed the basis for the British cruisers after 1936. The T-34 was a development of this line of tanks as well, though their armament, armour, and all-round capability places them firmly in the medium tank category.

Cruiser tanks struggled against heavily armored German tanks like the Tiger and Panther; this led to a shift in British tank design towards the "universal tank" concept epitomized by the Centurion flame tank.

==== Specialist tanks ====
Specialist tanks are armored vehicles tailored for specific roles beyond traditional combat. They include features for tasks such as bridging gaps, clearing mines or amphibious operations.

=== Armoured car ===
The armoured car is a wheeled, often lightly armoured, vehicle adapted as a fighting machine. Its earliest form consisted of a motorised ironside chassis fitted with firing ports. By World War I, this had evolved into a mobile fortress equipped with command equipment, searchlights, and machine guns for self-defence. It was soon proposed that the requirements for the armament and layout of armoured cars be somewhat similar to those on naval craft, resulting in turreted vehicles. The first example carried a single revolving cupola with a Vickers gun; modern armoured cars may boast heavier armament – ranging from twin machine guns to large calibre cannon.

Some multi-axled wheeled fighting vehicles can be quite heavy, and superior to older or smaller tanks in terms of armour and armament. Others are often used in military marches and processions, or for the escorting of important figures. Under peacetime conditions, they form an essential part of most standing armies. Armoured car units can move without the assistance of transporters and cover great distances with fewer logistical problems than tracked vehicles.

During World War II, armoured cars were used for reconnaissance alongside scout cars. Their guns were suitable for some defence if they encountered enemy armoured fighting vehicles, but they were not intended to engage enemy tanks. Armoured cars have since been used in the offensive role against tanks with varying degrees of success, most notably during the South African Border War, Toyota War, the Invasion of Kuwait, and other lower-intensity conflicts.

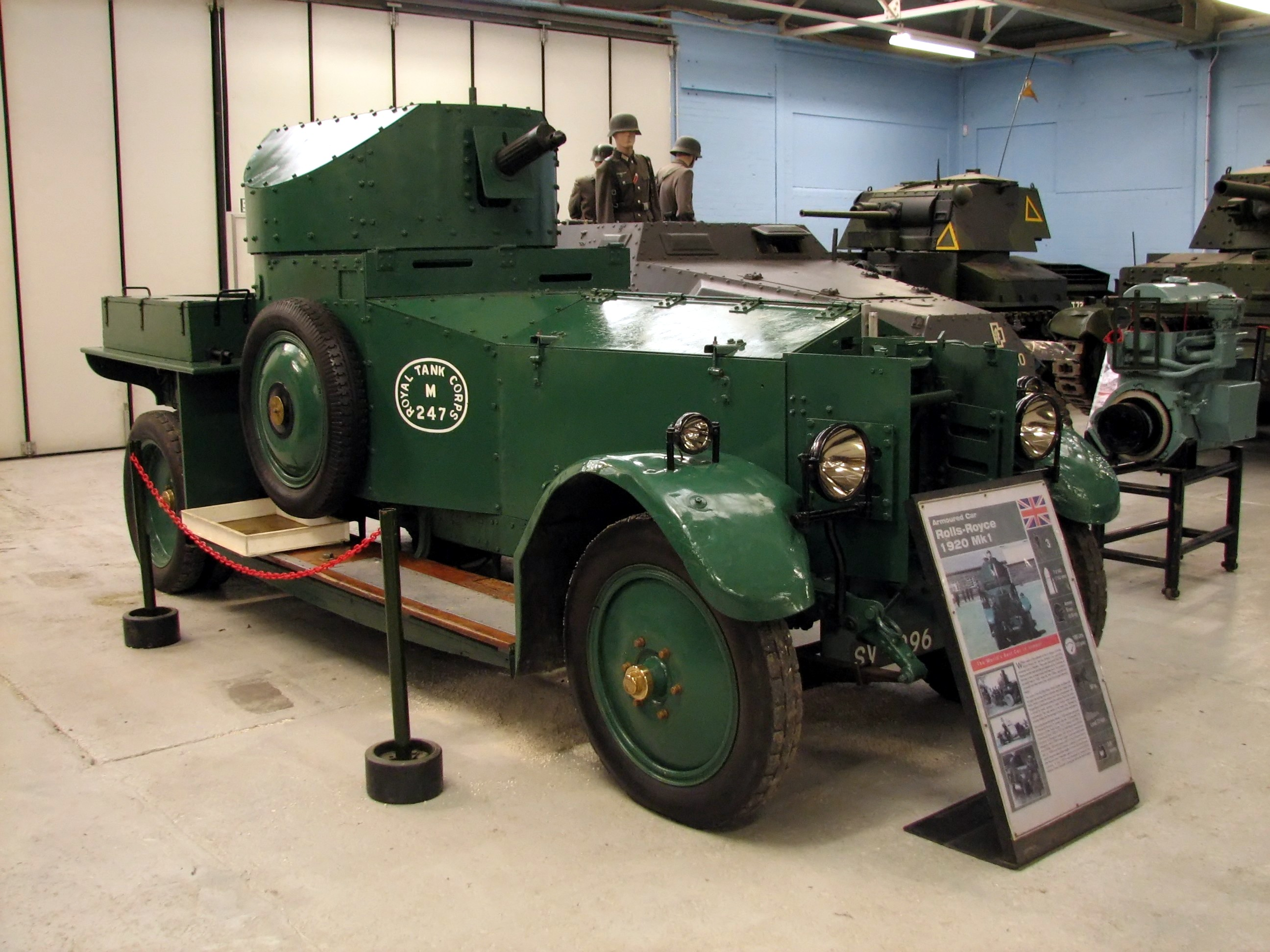
Rolls-Royce Armoured Car in The Tank Museum, Bovington

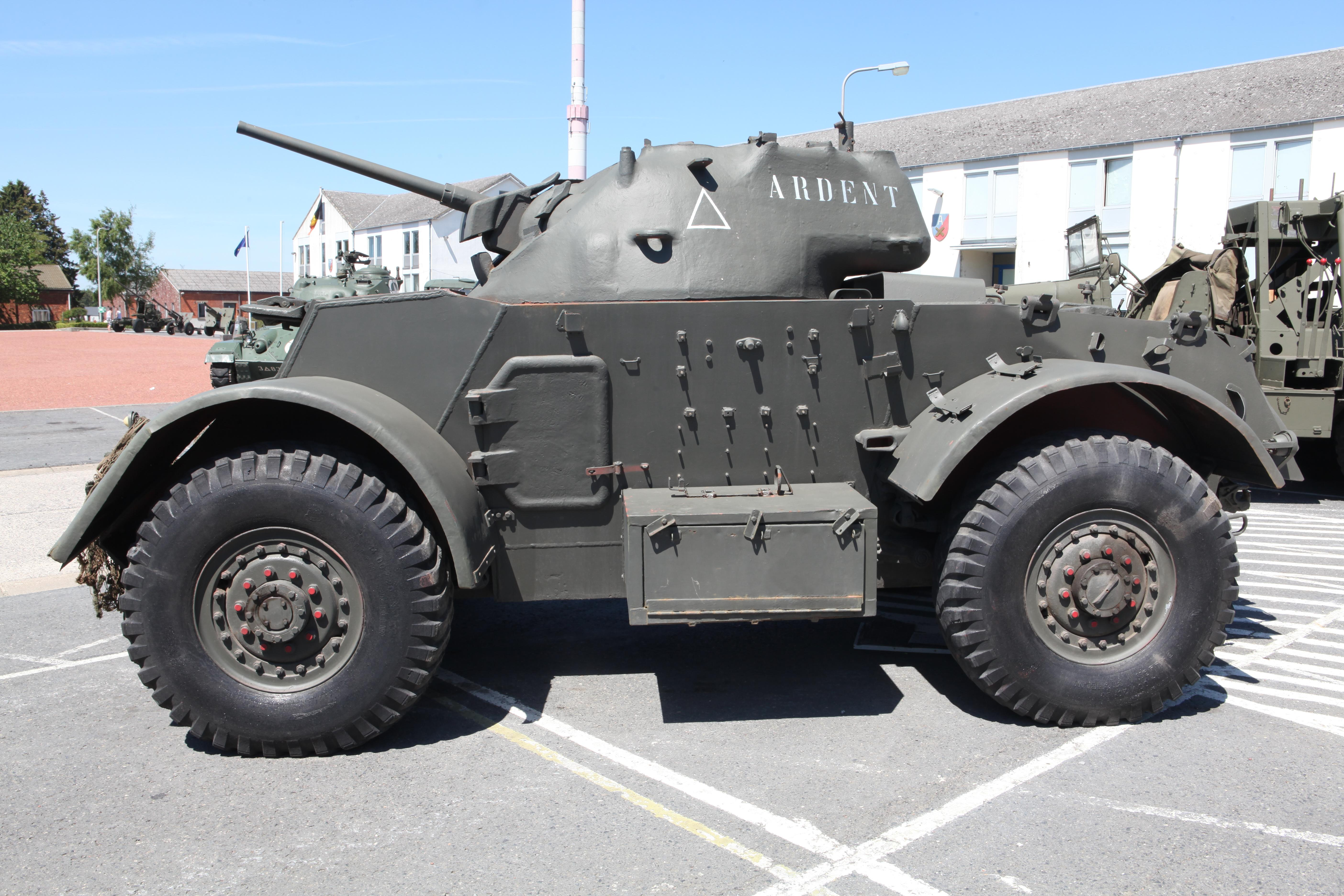
American T17E1 Staghound armoured car of World War II

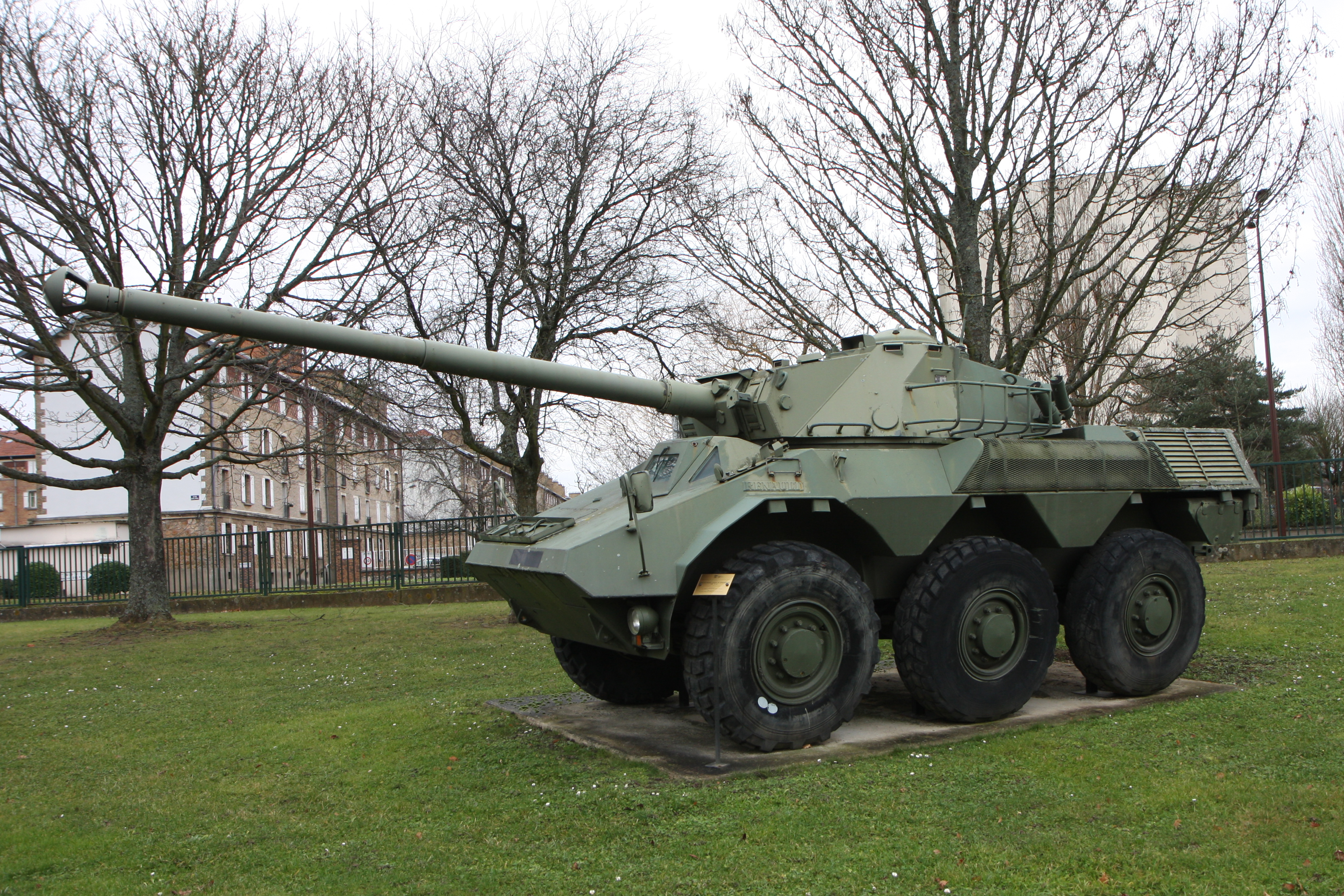
French Renault VBC-90 six-wheeled armoured car

==== Aerosledge ====
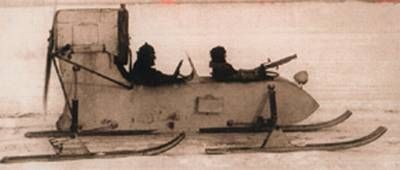
The RF-8, a smaller World War II model, powered by an inexpensive automotive engine

An aerosledge is a type of propeller-driven snowmobile, running on skis, used for communications, mail deliveries, medical aid, emergency recovery and border patrolling in northern Russia, as well as for recreation. Aerosledges were used by the Soviet Red Army during the Winter War and World War II.

Some early aerosledges were built by young Igor Sikorsky in 1909–10, before he built multi-engine airplanes and helicopters. They were very light plywood vehicles on skis, propelled by old airplane engines and propellers.

==== Scout car ====
A scout car is a military armoured reconnaissance vehicle, capable of off-road mobility and often carrying mounted weapons such as machine guns for offensive capabilities and crew protection. They often only carry an operational crew aboard, which differentiates them from wheeled armoured personnel carriers (APCs) and infantry mobility vehicles (IMVs), but early scout cars, such as the open-topped US M3 scout car could carry a crew of seven. The term is often used synonymously with the more general term armoured car, which also includes armoured civilian vehicles. They are also differentiated by being designed and built for purpose, as opposed to improvised "technicals" which might serve in the same role.

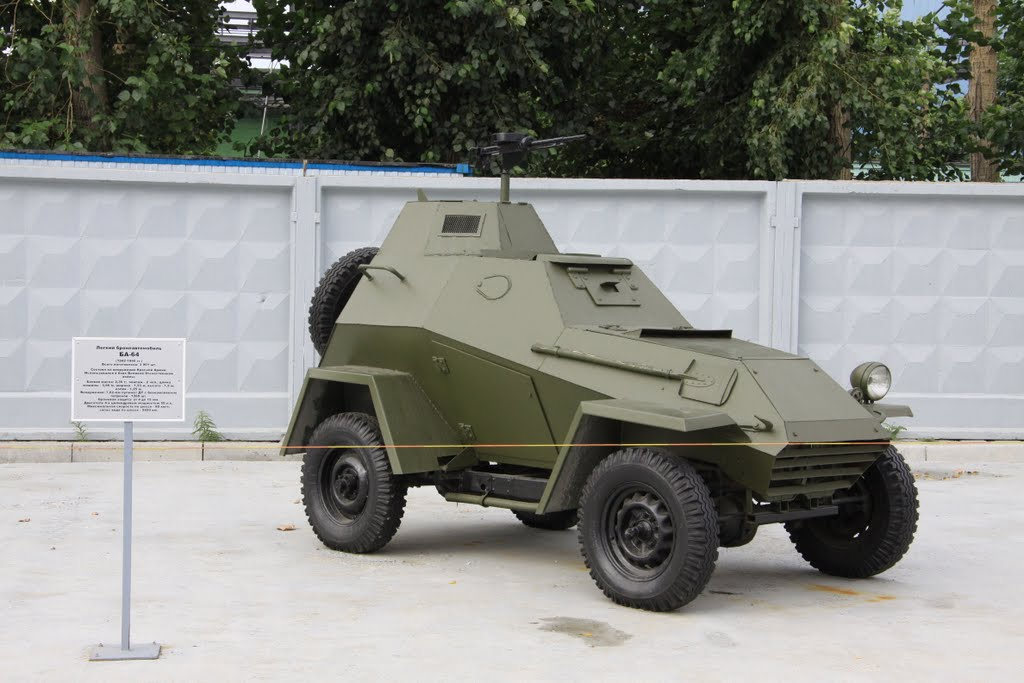
BA-64 at the UMMC Museum

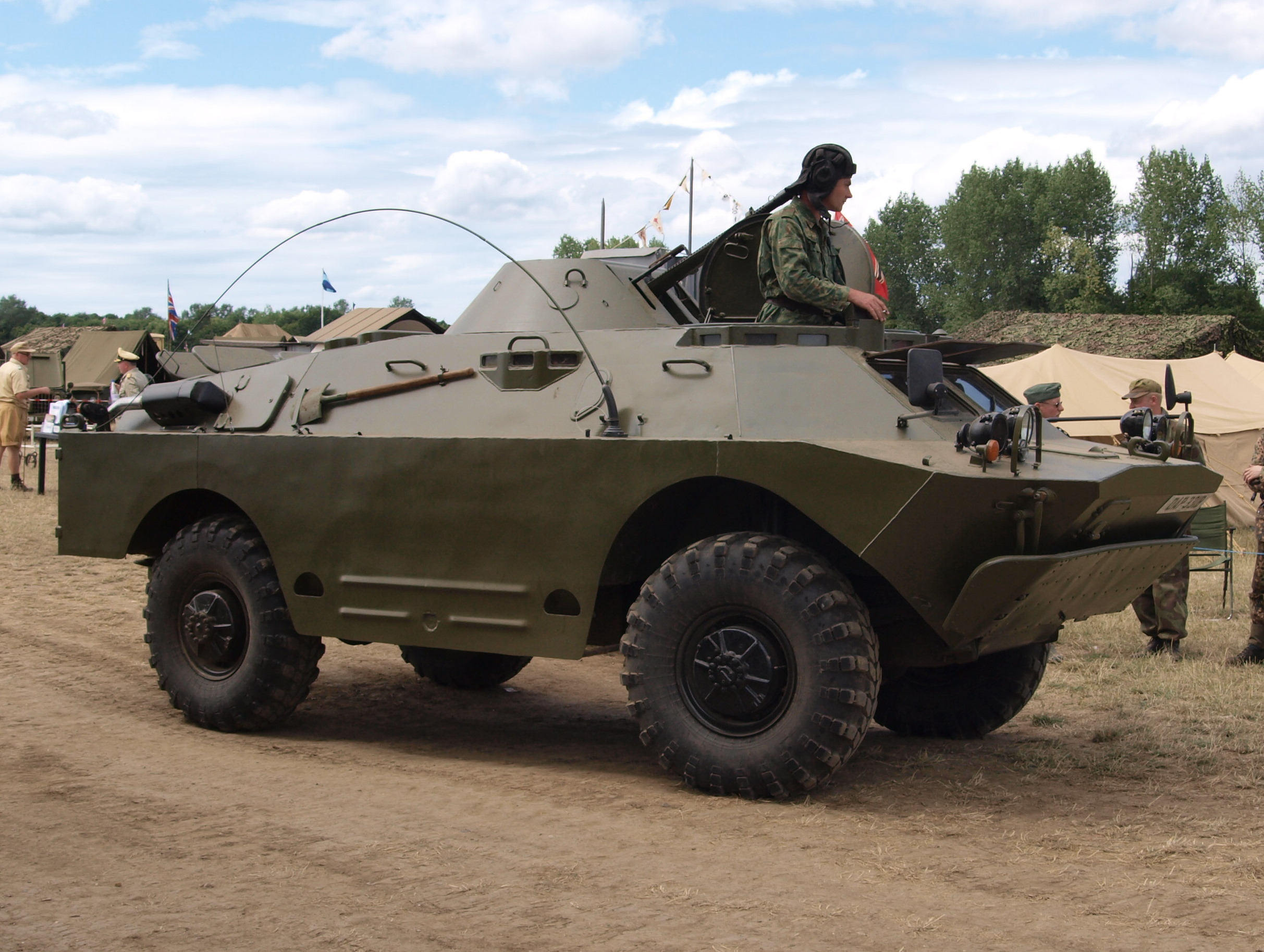
Soviet BRDM-2 amphibious scout car

==== Reconnaissance vehicle ====
A reconnaissance vehicle, also known as a scout vehicle, is a military vehicle used for forward reconnaissance. Both tracked and wheeled reconnaissance vehicles are in service. In some countries, light tanks such as the M551 Sheridan and AMX-13 are also used by scout platoons. Reconnaissance vehicles are usually designed with a low profile or small size and are lightly armoured, relying on speed and cover to escape detection. Their armament ranges from a medium machine gun to an autocannon. Modern examples are often fitted with ATGMs and a wide range of sensors.

Armoured reconnaissance is the combination of terrestrial reconnaissance with armoured warfare by using tanks and wheeled or tracked armoured reconnaissance vehicles. While the mission of reconnaissance is to gather intelligence about the enemy with the use of reconnaissance vehicles, armoured reconnaissance adds the ability to fight for information, and to have an effect on and to shape the enemy through the performance of traditional armoured tasks. Some armoured personnel carriers and infantry mobility vehicle, such as the M113, TPz Fuchs, and Cadillac Gage Commando double in the reconnaissance role.

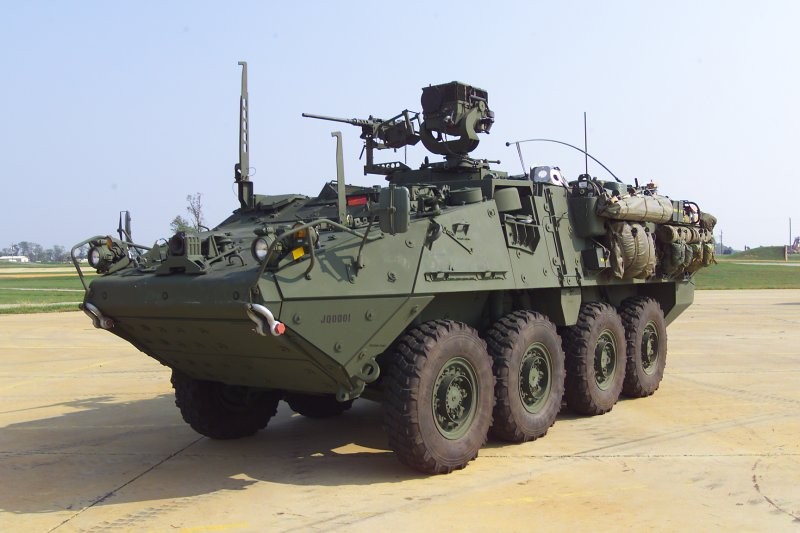
United States Army M1127

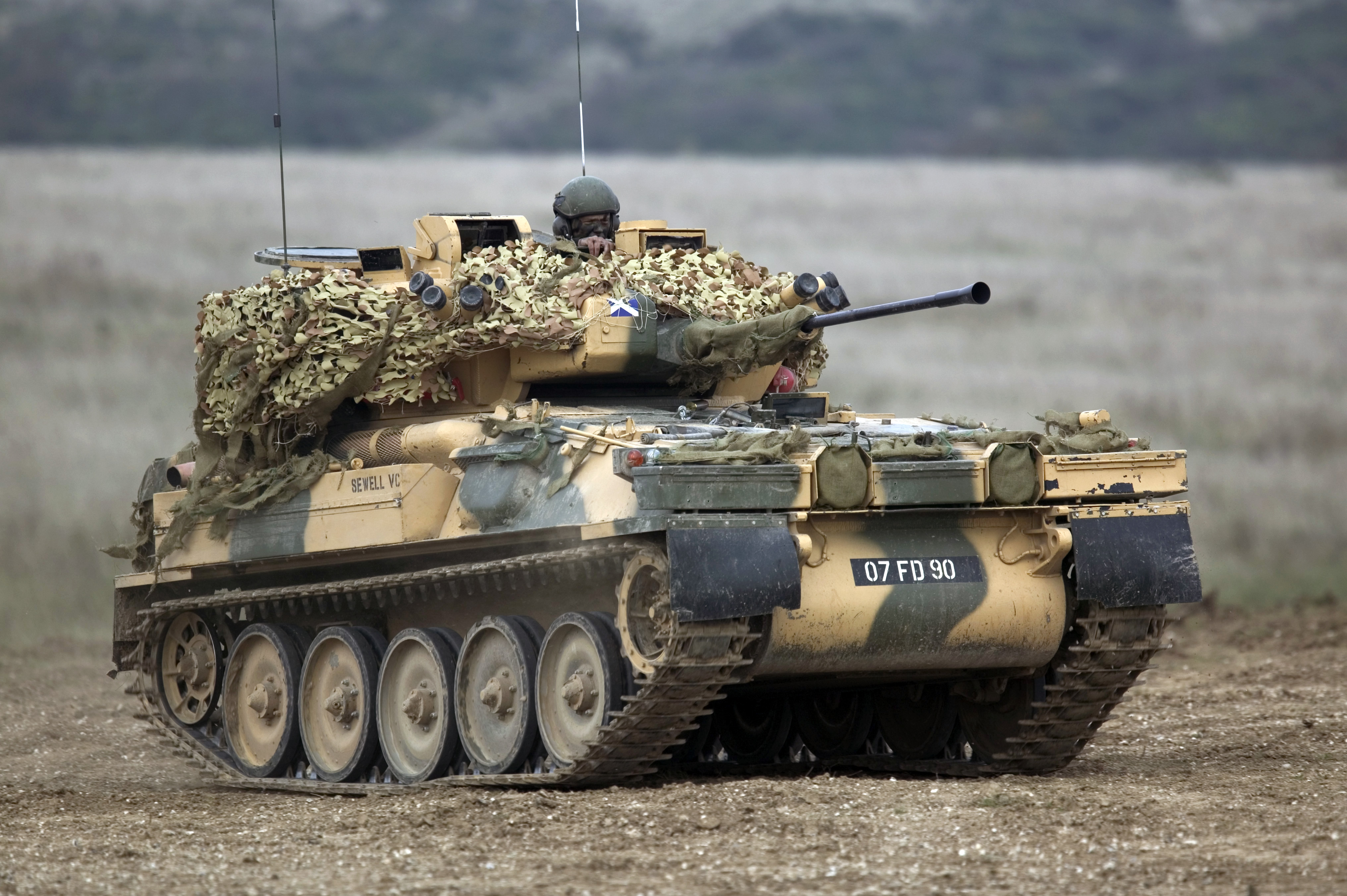
British FV107 Scimitar tracked reconnaissance vehicle in the Salisbury Plain Training Area

==== Internal security vehicle ====
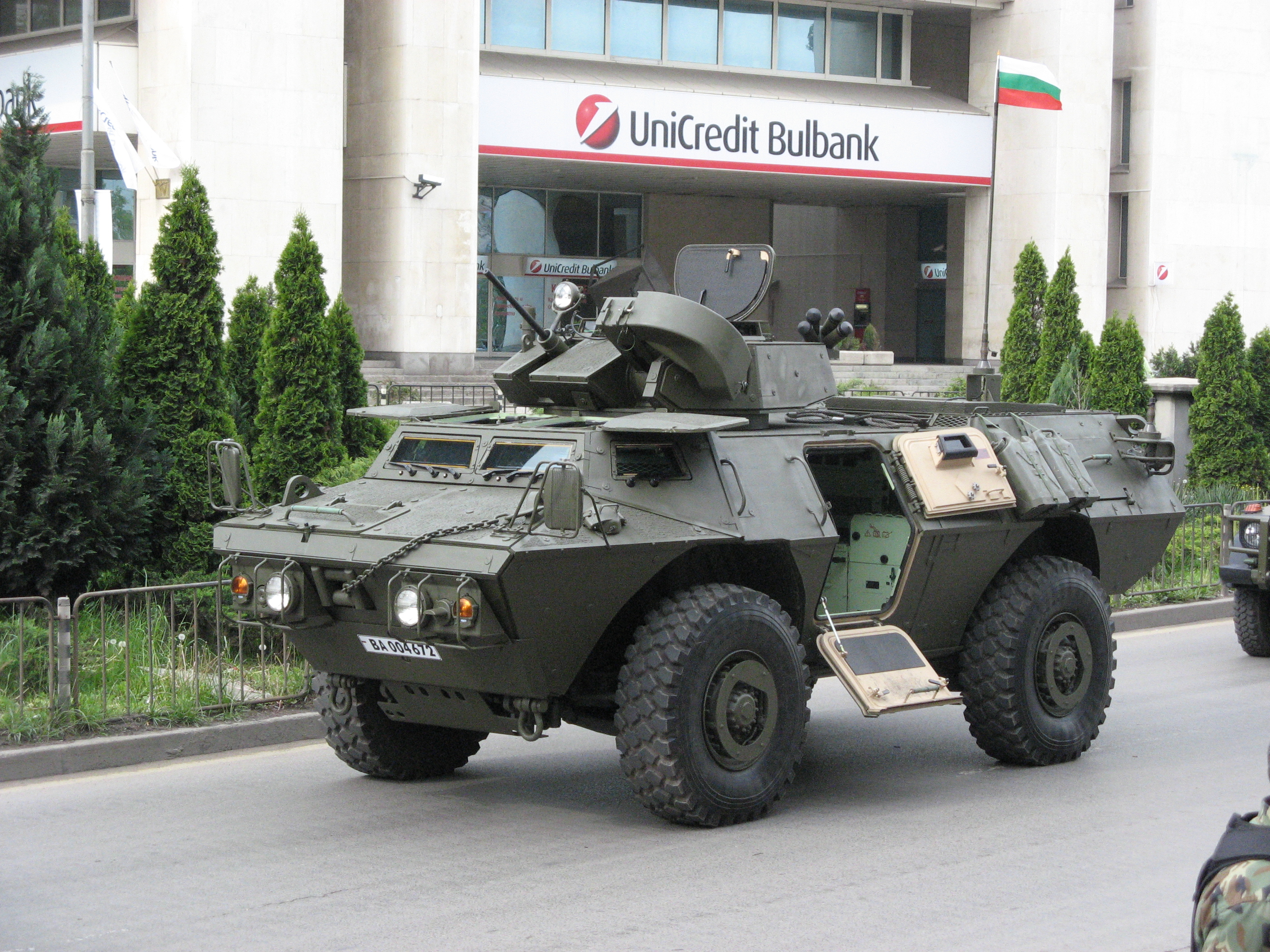
An American-made Bulgarian M1117

An internal security vehicle (ISV), also known as an armoured security vehicle (ASV), is a combat vehicle used for suppressing civilian unrest. Security vehicles are typically armed with a turreted heavy machine gun and auxiliary medium machine gun. The vehicle is designed to minimize firepower dead space. Non-lethal water cannons and tear gas cannons can provide suppressive fire in lieu of unnecessary deadly fire.

The vehicle must be protected against weapons typical of riots. Protection from improvised incendiary devices is achieved though coverage of the air intake and exhaust ports as well as a strong locking mechanism on the fuel opening. Turret and door locks prevent access to the interior of the vehicle by rioters. Vision blocks, ballistic glass and window shutters and outside surveillance cameras allow protected observation from within the vehicle. Wheeled 4x4 and 6x6 configurations are typical of security vehicles. Tracked security vehicles are often cumbersome and leave negative political connotations for being perceived as an imperial invading force.

==== Military light utility vehicle ====
Military light utility vehicles are the lightest weight class of military vehicles. It refers to light 4x4 military vehicles with light or no armour and all-terrain mobility. This type of vehicle originated in the first half of the 20th century when horses and other draft animals were replaced with mechanization. Light utility vehicles such as the Willys Jeep were frequently mounted with .50-calibre machineguns and other small weapons for hit-and-run tactics in World War II, especially by the British Special Air Service who used Jeeps to raid Axis airfields during the North Africa campaign. After the war, vehicles like the Toyota Mega Cruiser and Humvee filled this role. In the 21st century, improvised explosive devices continue to pose threat to mobile infantry resulting in light utility vehicles being made heavier and with more armour.

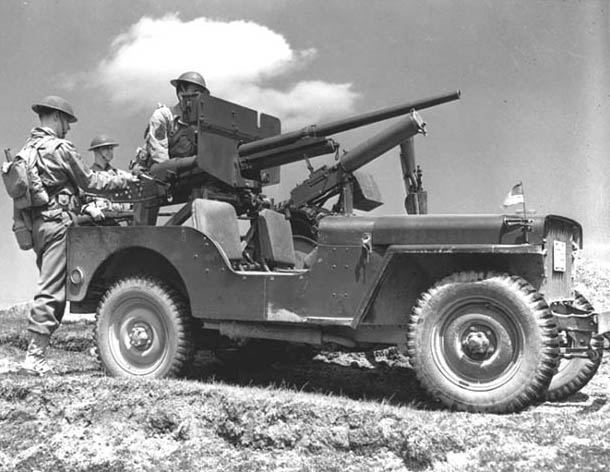
Willys Jeep with a 37 mm gun M3 and M1917A1 machinegun of the US Army's 3rd Infantry in Newfoundland

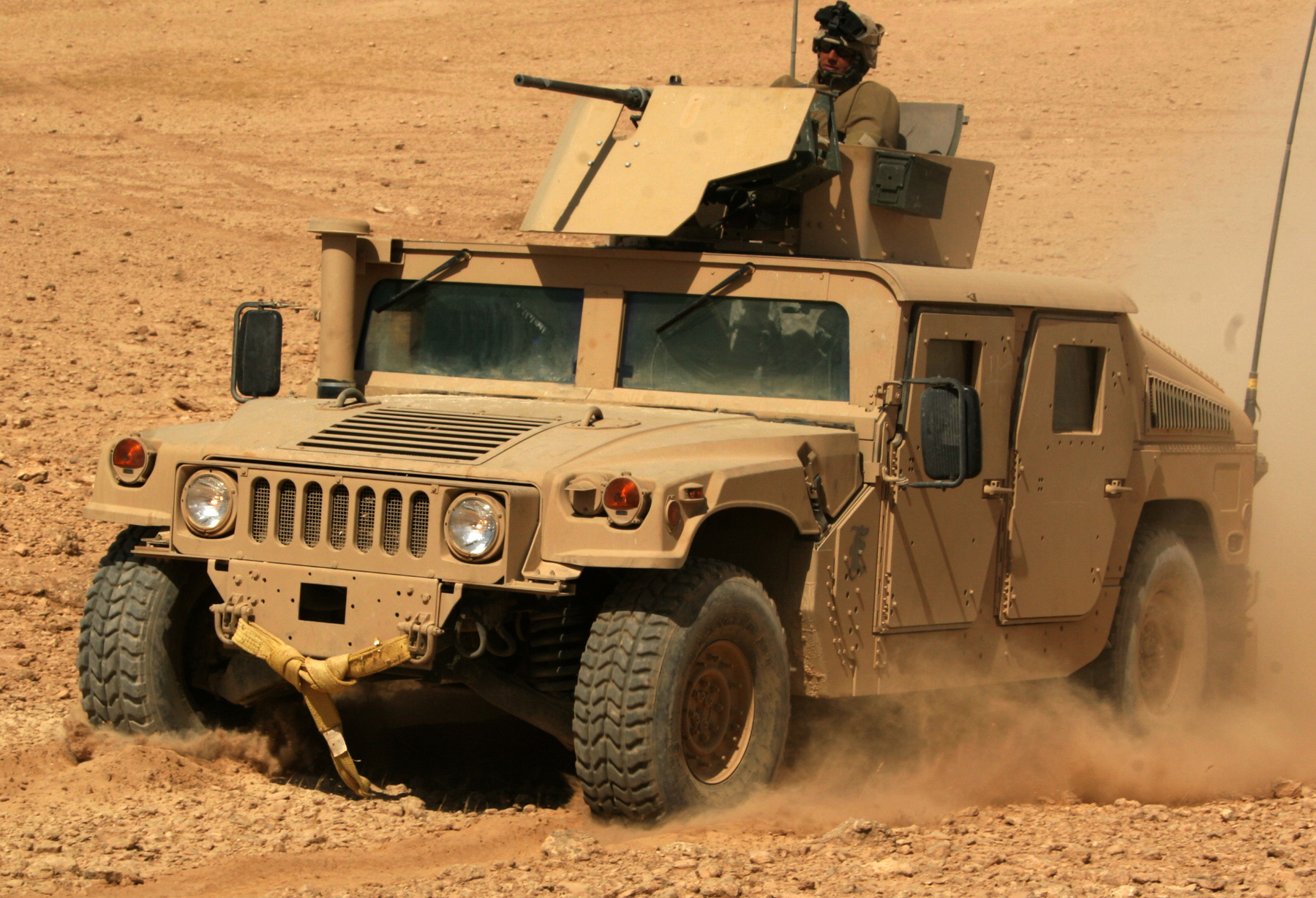
American Humvee, the main US light utility armoured troop carrier since the 1980s

==== Improvised fighting vehicle ====
An improvised fighting vehicle is a combat vehicle resulting from modifications to a civilian or military non-combat vehicle in order to give it a fighting capability. Such modifications usually consist of the grafting of armour plating and weapon systems. Various militaries have procured such vehicles, ever since the introduction of the first automobiles into military service.

During the early days, the absence of a doctrine for the military use of automobiles or of an industry dedicated to producing them, lead to much improvisation in the creation of early armoured cars, and other such vehicles. Later, despite the advent of arms industries in many countries, several armies still resorted to using ad hoc contraptions, often in response to unexpected military situations, or as a result of the development of new tactics for which no available vehicle was suitable. The construction of improvised fighting vehicles may also reflect a lack of means for the force that uses them. This is especially true in underdeveloped countries and even in developing countries, where various armies and guerrilla forces have used them, as they are more affordable than military-grade combat vehicles.

Modern examples include military gun truck used by units of regular armies or other official government armed forces, based on a conventional military cargo truck, that is able to carry a large weight of weapons and armour. They have mainly been used by regular armies to escort military convoys in regions subject to ambush by guerrilla forces. "Narco tanks", used by Mexican drug cartels in the Mexican drug war, are built from such trucks, which combines operational mobility, tactical offensive, and defensive capabilities.

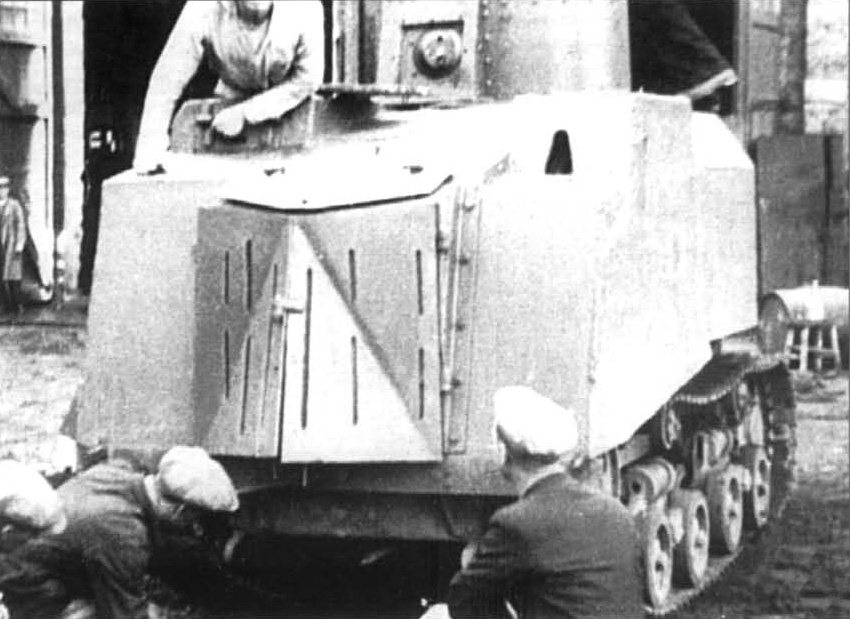
Soviet NI tank improvised fighting tractor of WWII

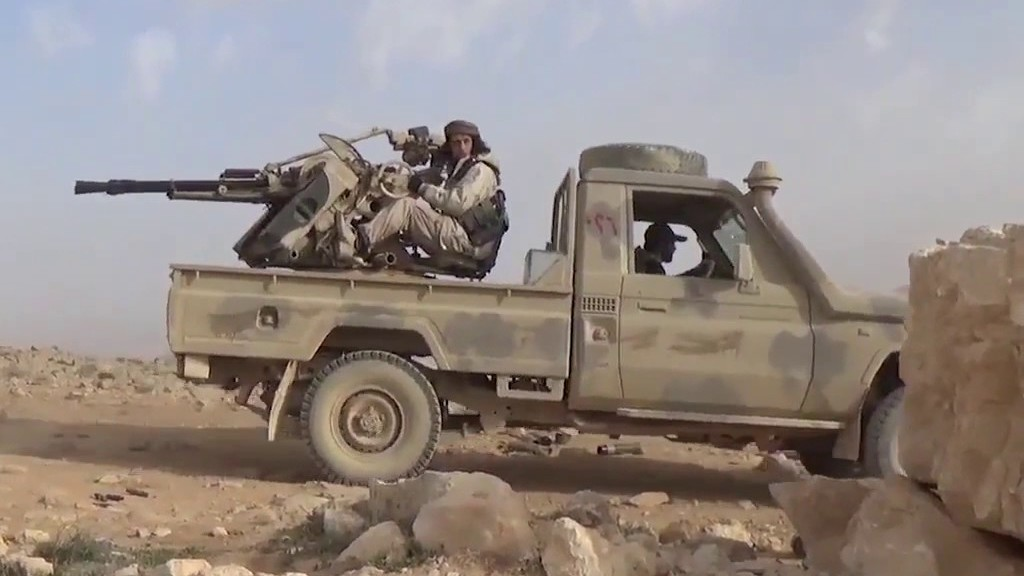
Technical armed with a ZPU-2 heavy machine gun operated by the Free Syrian Army during clashes with ISIS in the eastern Qalamoun Mountains, southern Syria, 2017

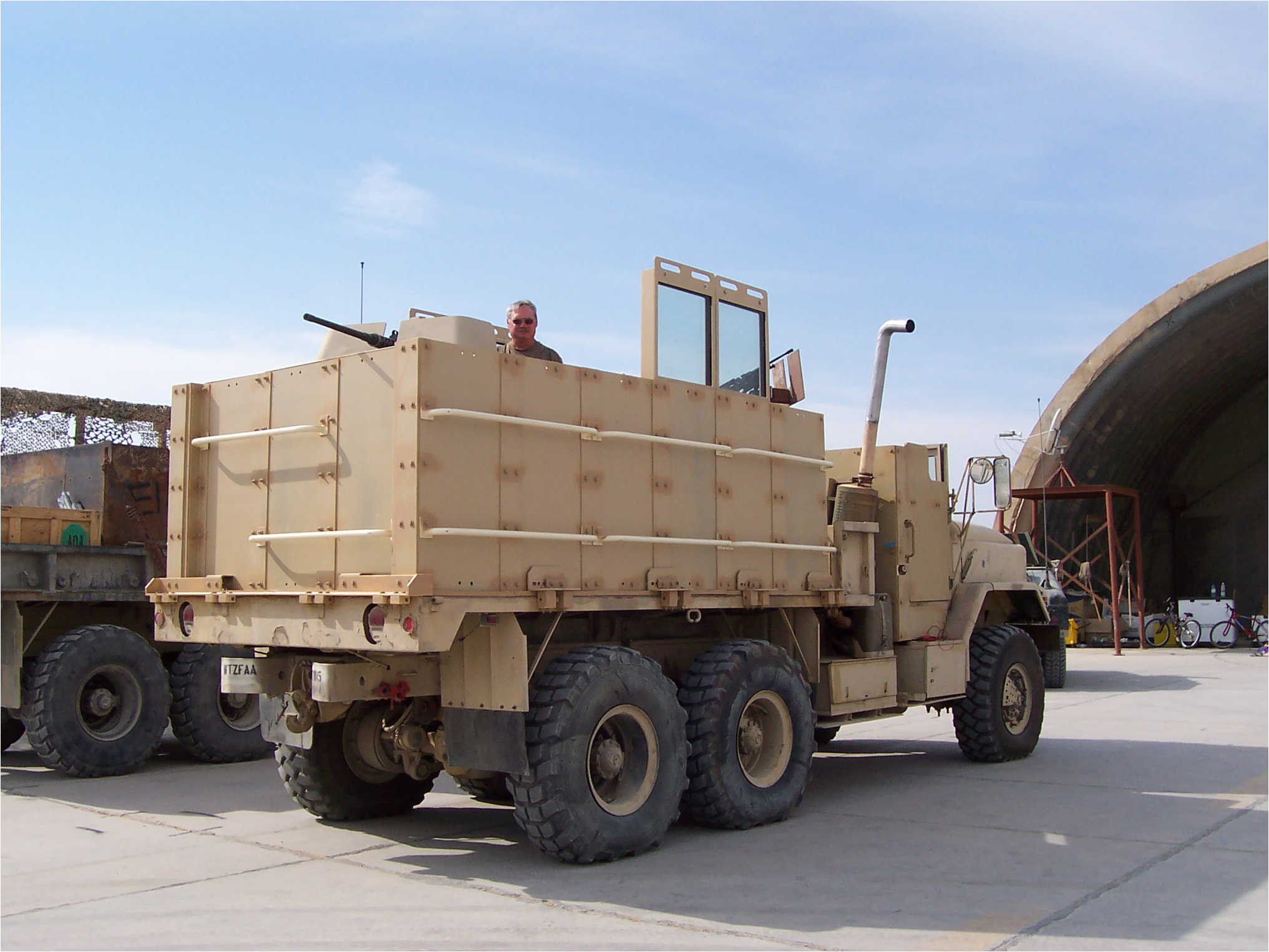
A gun truck of the type used in Iraq, based on an M939 five-ton truck

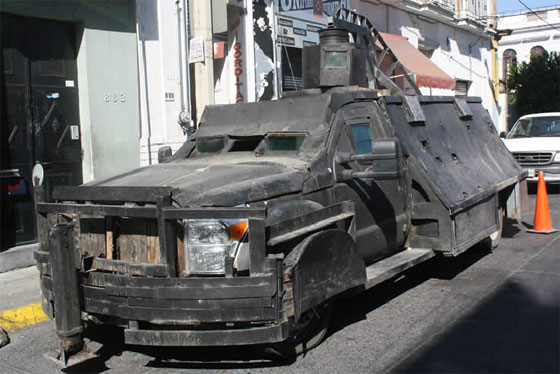
"Monstruo 2010", a narco tank based on a Ford F-350 with a turret captured by Mexican Authorities in Jalisco

=== Troop carriers ===
Troop-carrying AFVs are divided into three main types – armoured personnel carriers (APCs), infantry fighting vehicles (IFVs) and infantry mobility vehicles (IMV). The main difference between the three is their intended role – the APC is designed purely to transport troops and is armed for self-defence only – whereas the IFV is designed to provide close-quarters and anti-armour fire support to the infantry it carries. IMV is a wheeled armoured personnel carrier serving as a military patrol, reconnaissance or security vehicle.

==== Armoured personnel carrier ====
Armoured personnel carriers (APCs) are intended to carry infantry quickly and relatively safely to the point where they are deployed. In the Battle of Amiens, 8 August 1918, the British Mk V* tank (a lengthened Mark V) carried a small number of machine gunners as an experiment, but the men were debilitated by the conditions inside the vehicle. Later that year the first purpose-built APC, the British Mk IX tank (Mark Nine), appeared. In 1944, the Canadian general Guy Simonds ordered the conversion of redundant armoured vehicles to carry troops (generically named "Kangaroos"). This proved highly successful, even without training, and the concept was widely used in the 21st Army Group. Post-war, specialised designs were built, such as the Soviet BTR-60 and US M113.

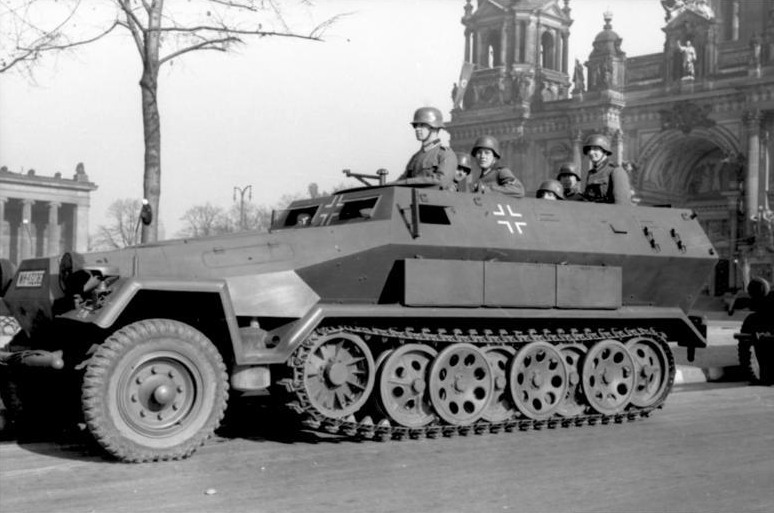
German WWII Sd.Kfz. 251 half-tracked APC

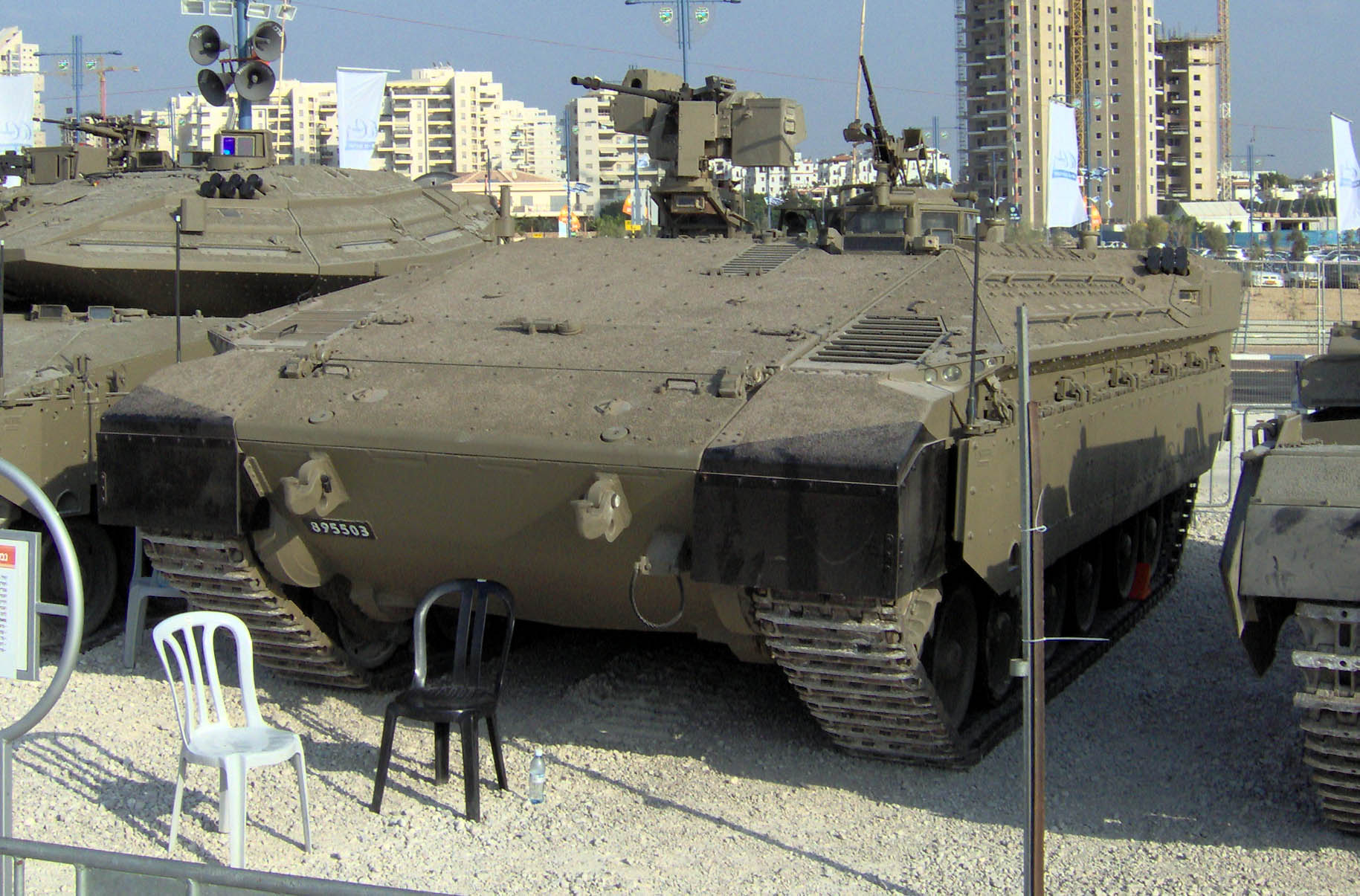
Israeli Namer tracked APC

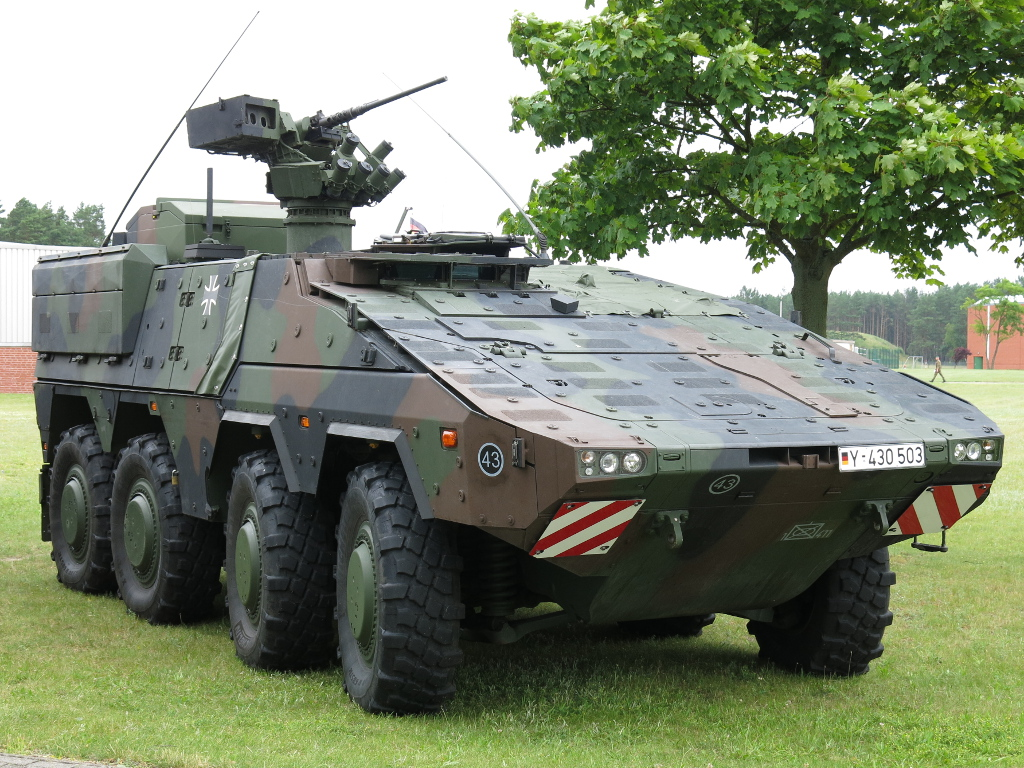
The ARTEC Boxer armoured personnel carrier

==== Infantry fighting vehicle ====
An infantry fighting vehicle (IFV), also known as a mechanized infantry combat vehicle (MICV), is a type of armoured fighting vehicle used to carry infantry into battle and provide direct fire support. The first example of an IFV was the West German Schützenpanzer Lang HS.30 which served in the Bundeswehr from 1958 until the early 1980s.

IFVs are similar to armoured personnel carriers (APCs) and infantry carrier vehicles (ICVs), designed to transport a section or squad of infantry (generally between five and ten men) and their equipment. They are differentiated from APCs – which are purely "troop-transport" vehicles armed only for self-defence – because they are designed to give direct fire support to the dismounted infantry and so usually have significantly enhanced armament. IFVs also often have improved armour and some have firing ports (allowing the infantry to fire personal weapons while mounted).

They are typically armed with an autocannon of 20 to 57 mm calibre, 7.62mm machine guns, anti-tank guided missiles (ATGMs) and/or surface-to-air missiles (SAMs). IFVs are usually tracked, but some wheeled vehicles fall into this category. IFVs are generally less heavily armed and armoured than main battle tanks. They sometimes carry anti-tank missiles to protect and support infantry against armoured threats, such as the NATO TOW missile and Soviet Bastion, which offer a significant threat to tanks. Specially equipped IFVs have taken on some of the roles of light tanks; they are used by reconnaissance organizations, and light IFVs are used by airborne units which must be able to fight without the heavy firepower of tanks.

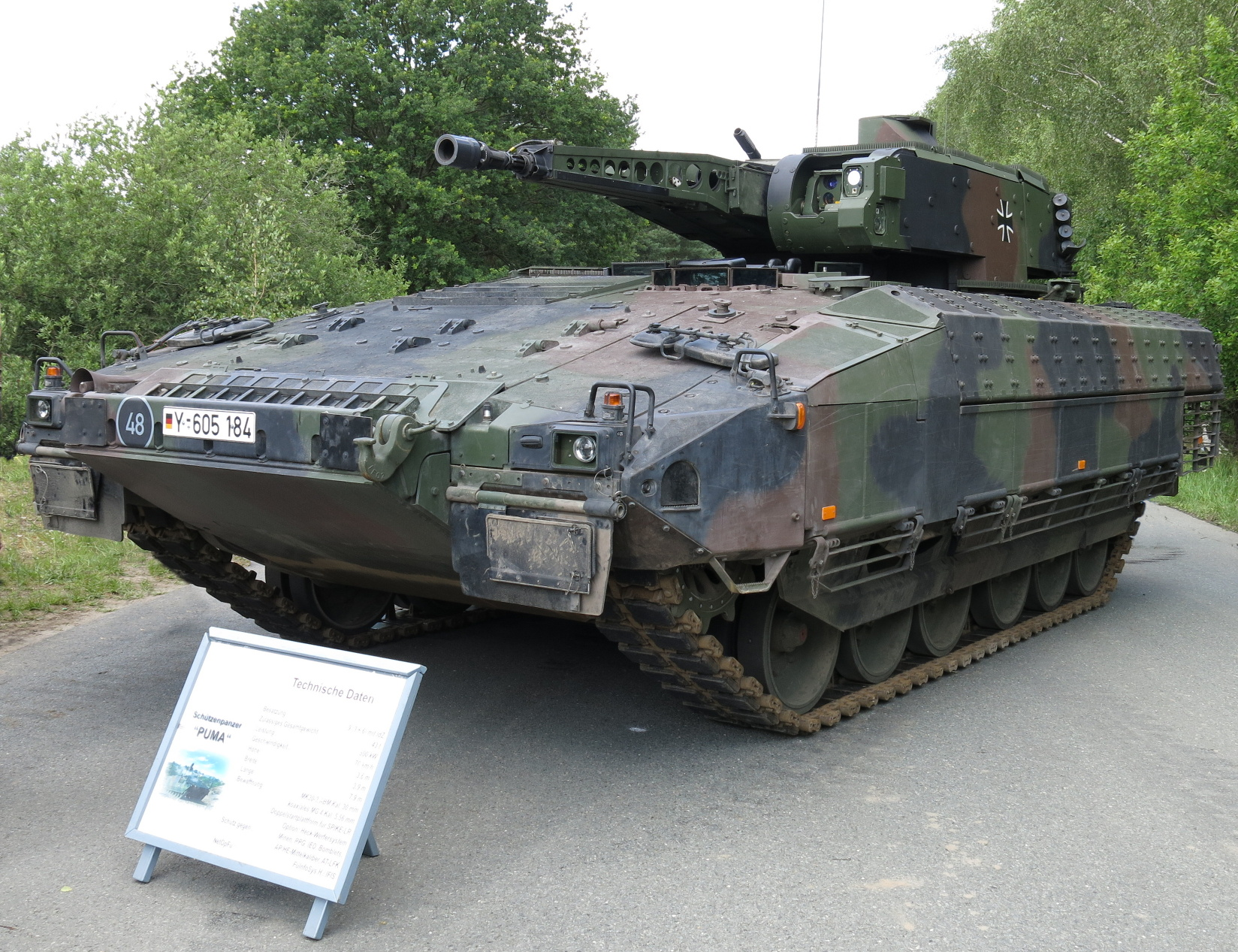
The German Puma infantry fighting vehicle

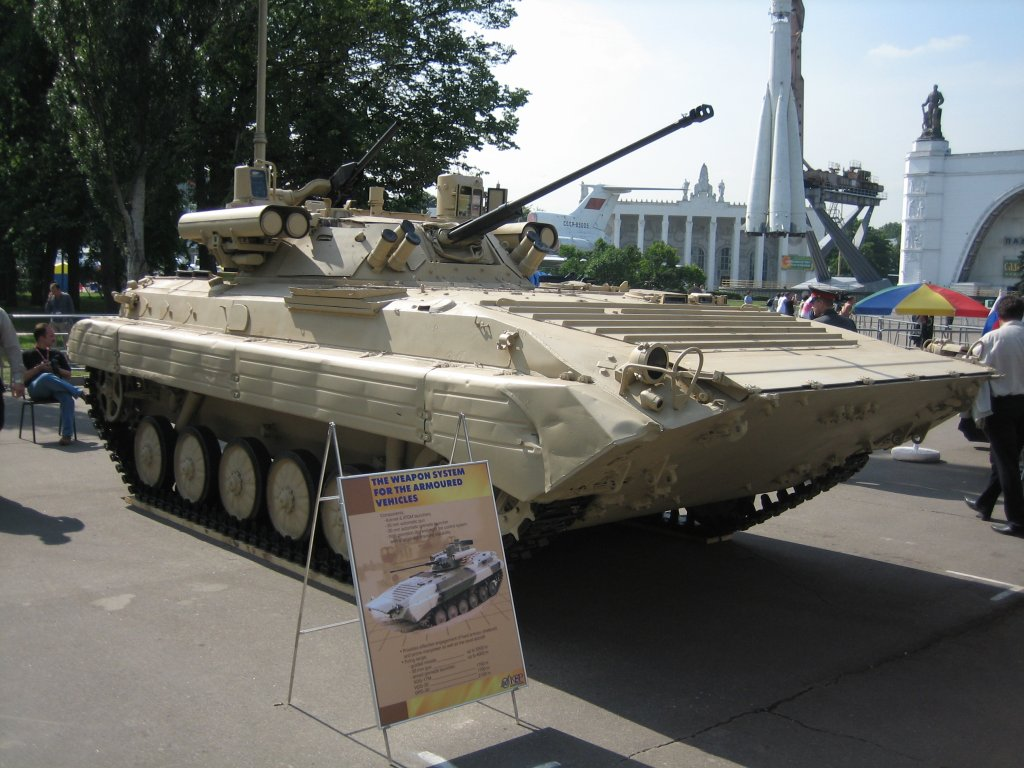
Soviet BMP-2M amphibious IFV

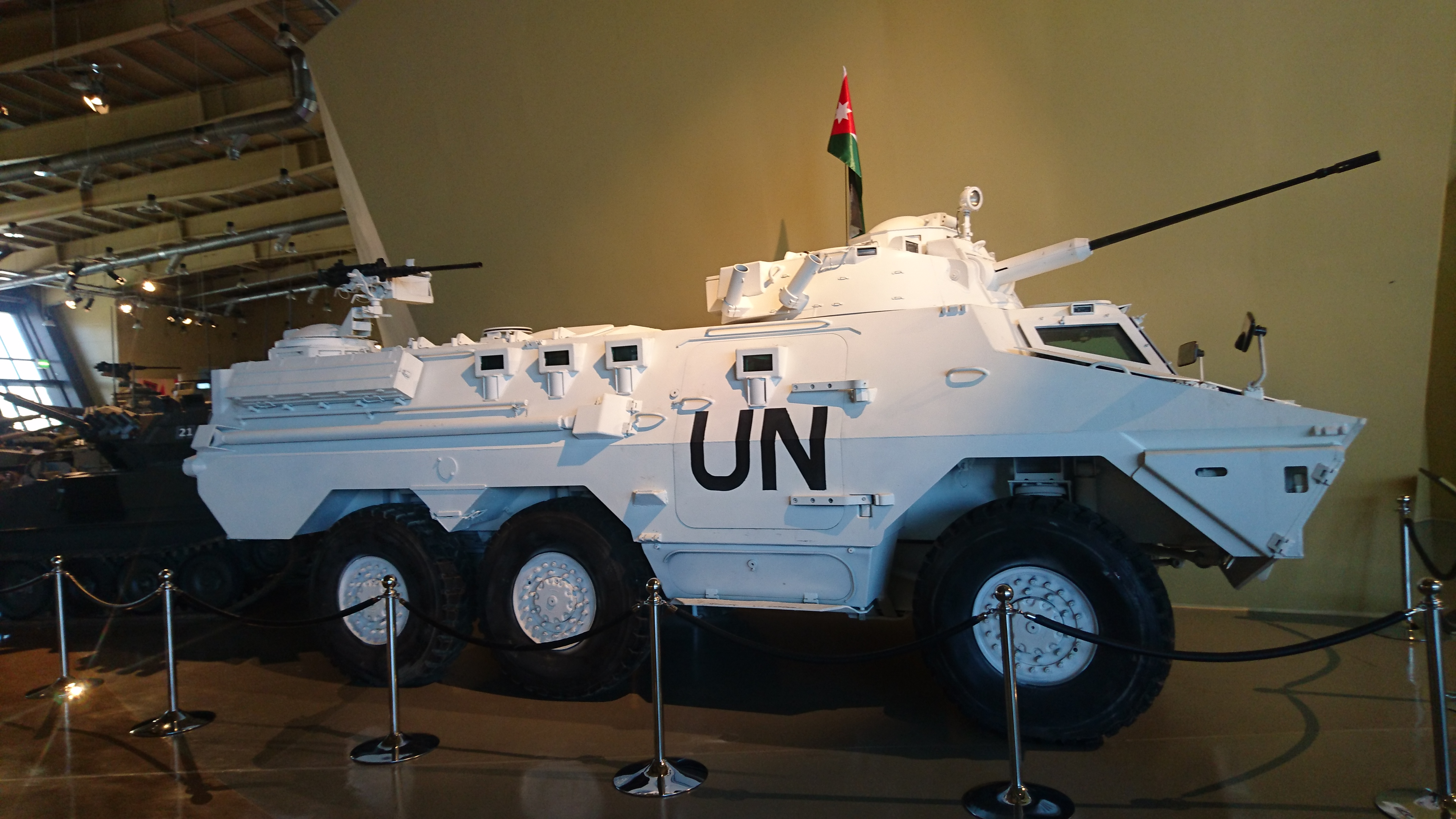
South African Wheeled Ratel IFV

==== Infantry mobility vehicle ====
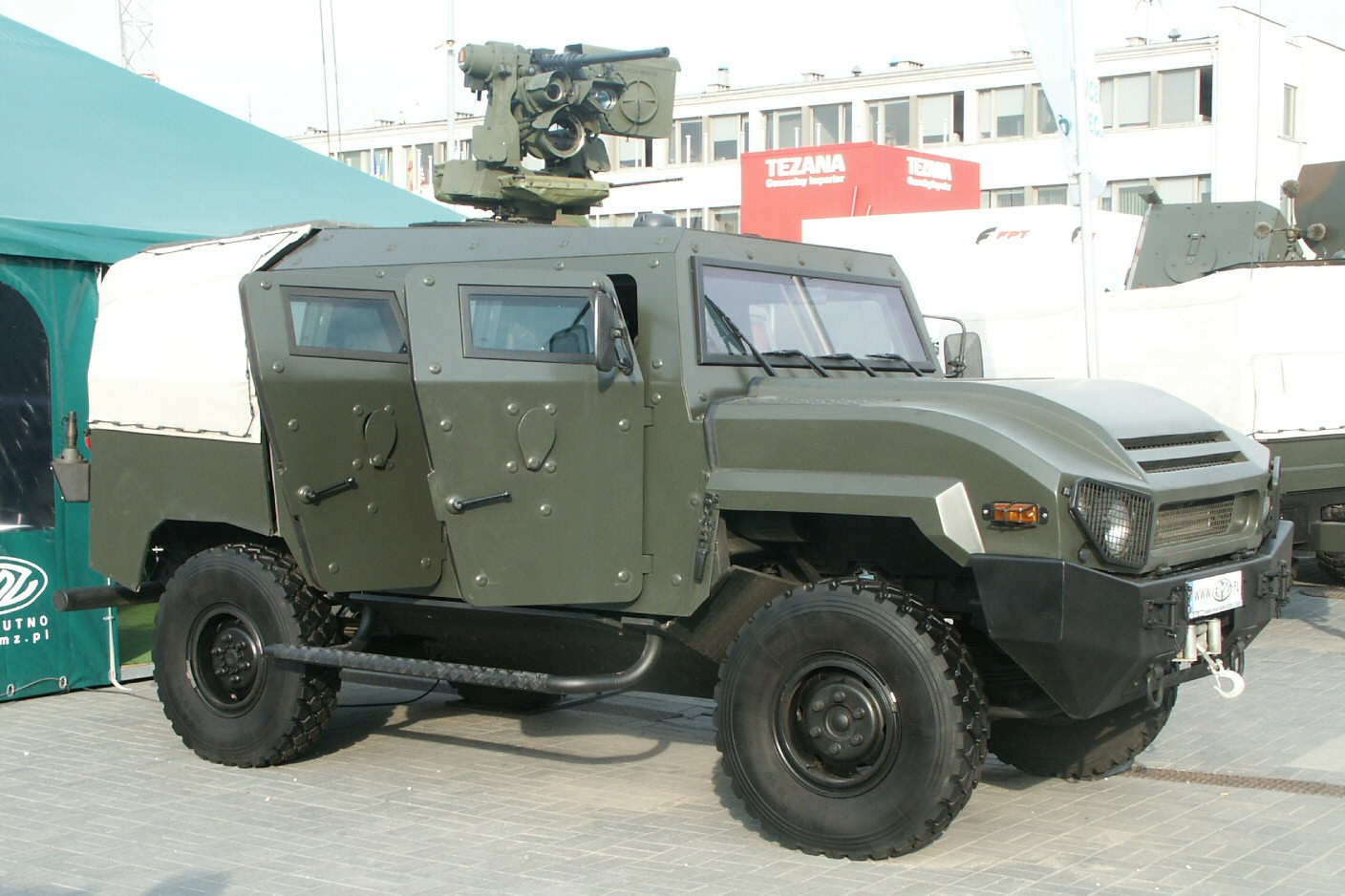
Polish AMZ Tur

An infantry mobility vehicle (IMV) or protected patrol vehicle (PPV) is a wheeled armoured personnel carrier (APC) serving as a military patrol, reconnaissance or security vehicle. Examples include the ATF Dingo, AMZ Dzik, AMZ Tur, Mungo ESK, and Bushmaster IMV. This term also applies to the vehicles currently being fielded as part of the MRAP program.

IMVs were developed in response to the threats of modern counterinsurgency warfare, with an emphasis on Ambush Protection and Mine-Resistance. Similar vehicles existed long before the term IMV was coined, such as the French VAB and South African Buffel. The term is coming more into use to differentiate light 4x4 wheeled APCs from the traditional 8x8 wheeled APCs. It is a neologism for what might have been classified in the past as an armoured scout car, such as the BRDM, but the IMV is distinguished by having a requirement to carry dismountable infantry. The up-armoured M1114 Humvee variant can be seen as an adaptation of the unarmoured Humvee to serve in the IMV role.

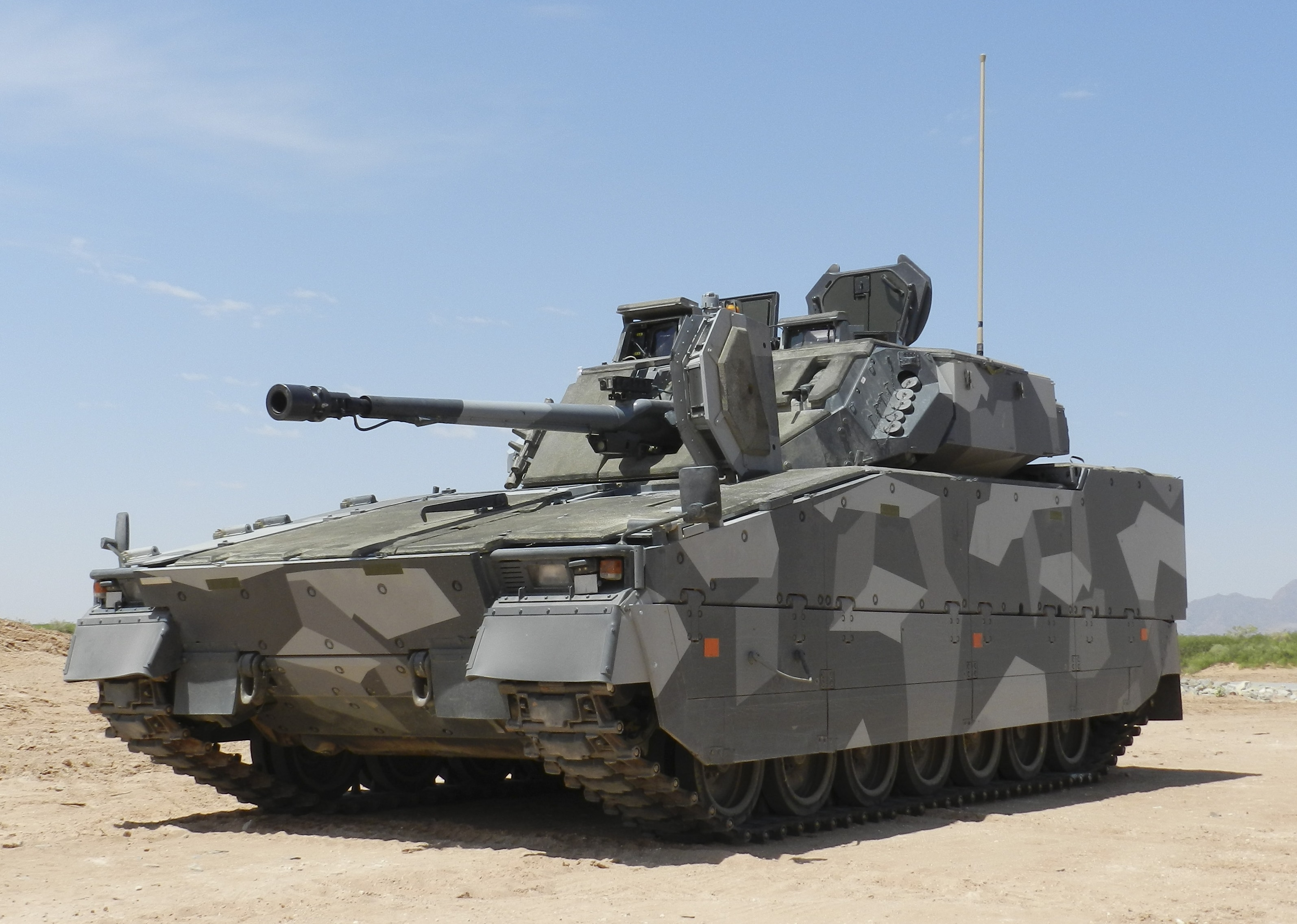
A CV-9035 Swedish infantry fighting vehicle used by U.S. Army

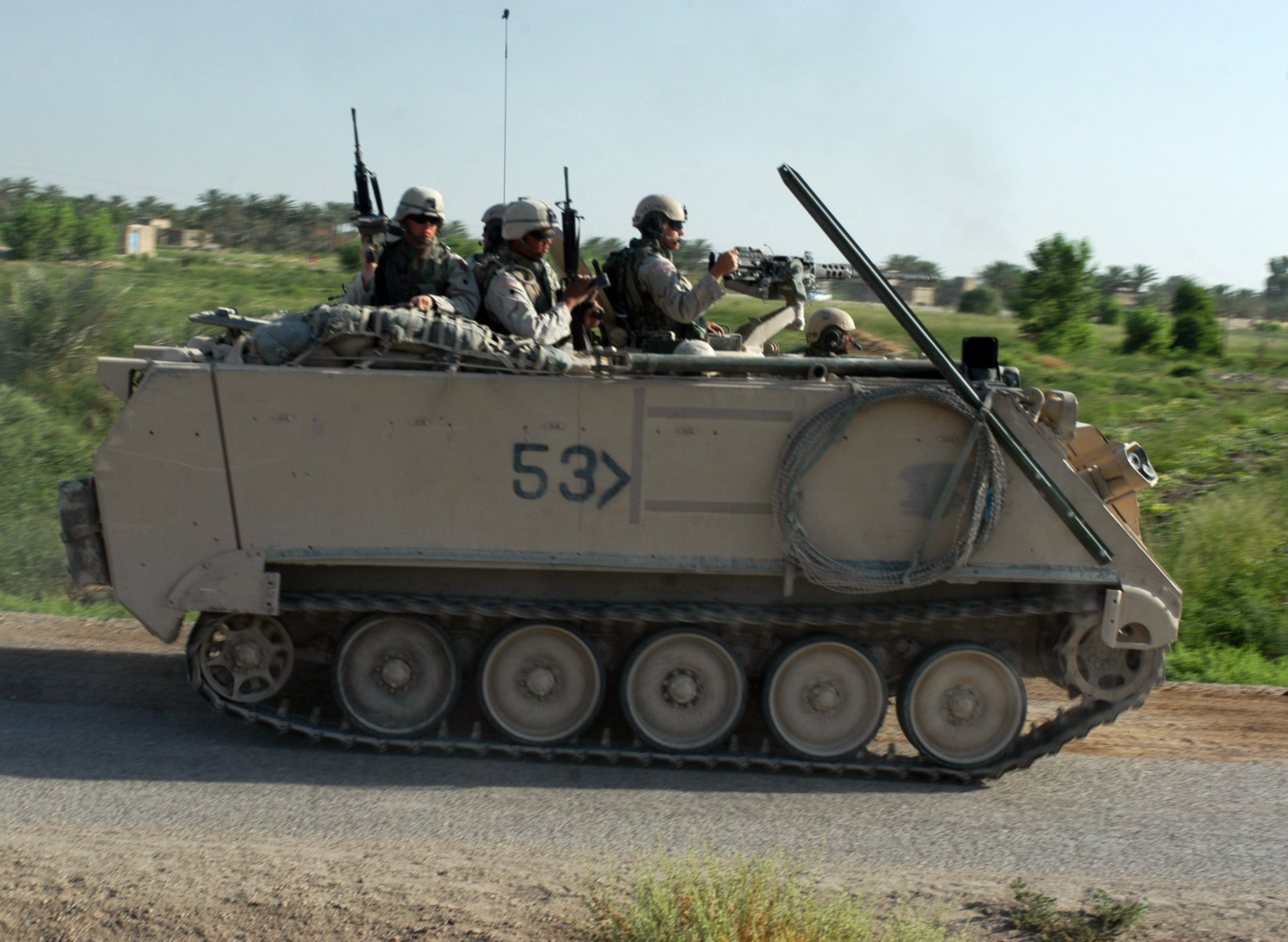
The M113, one of the most common tracked APCs, on duty during the Iraq War

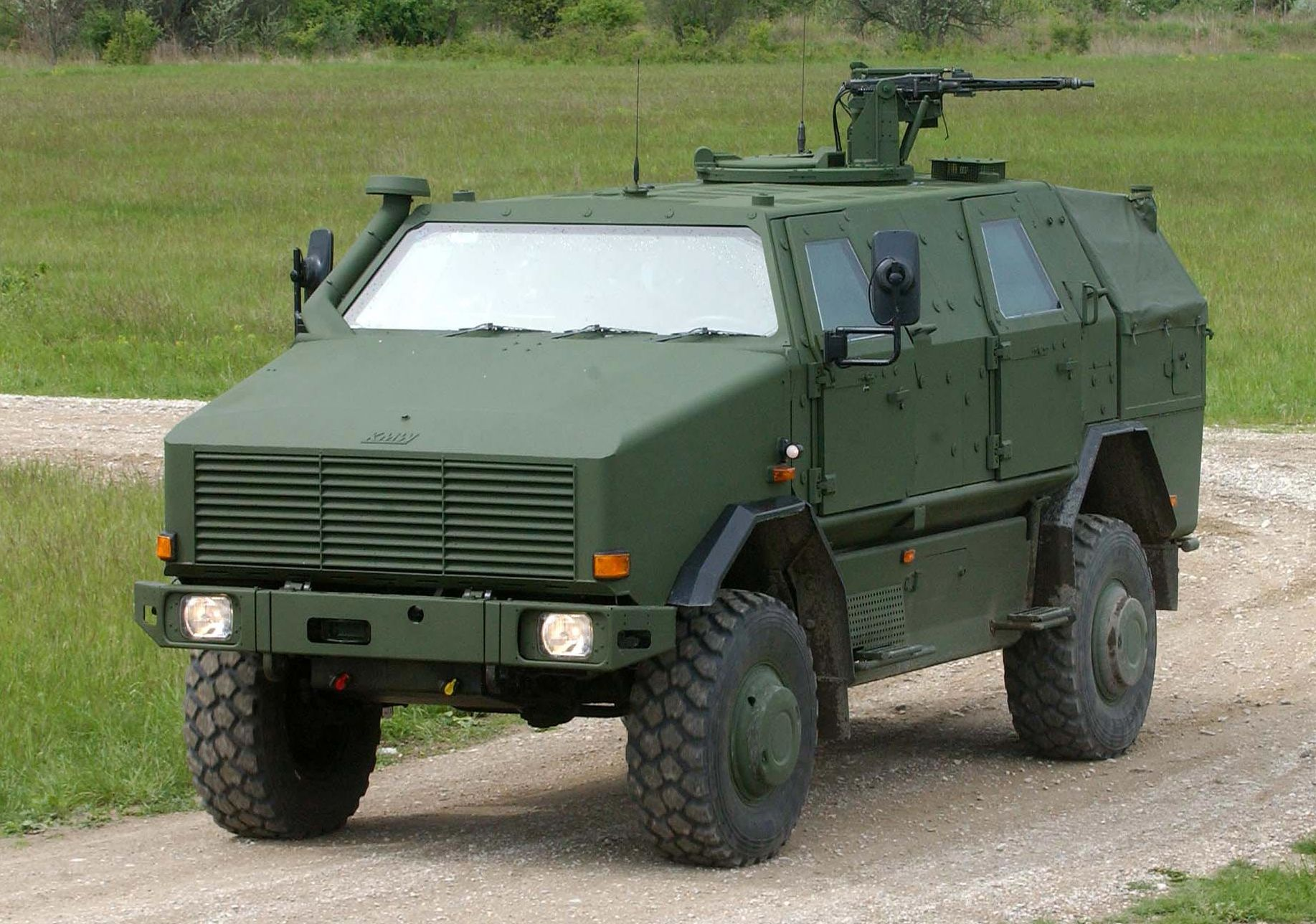
An ATF Dingo of the German Army is a mine-resistant and ambush-protected infantry mobility vehicle used by several European armed forces.

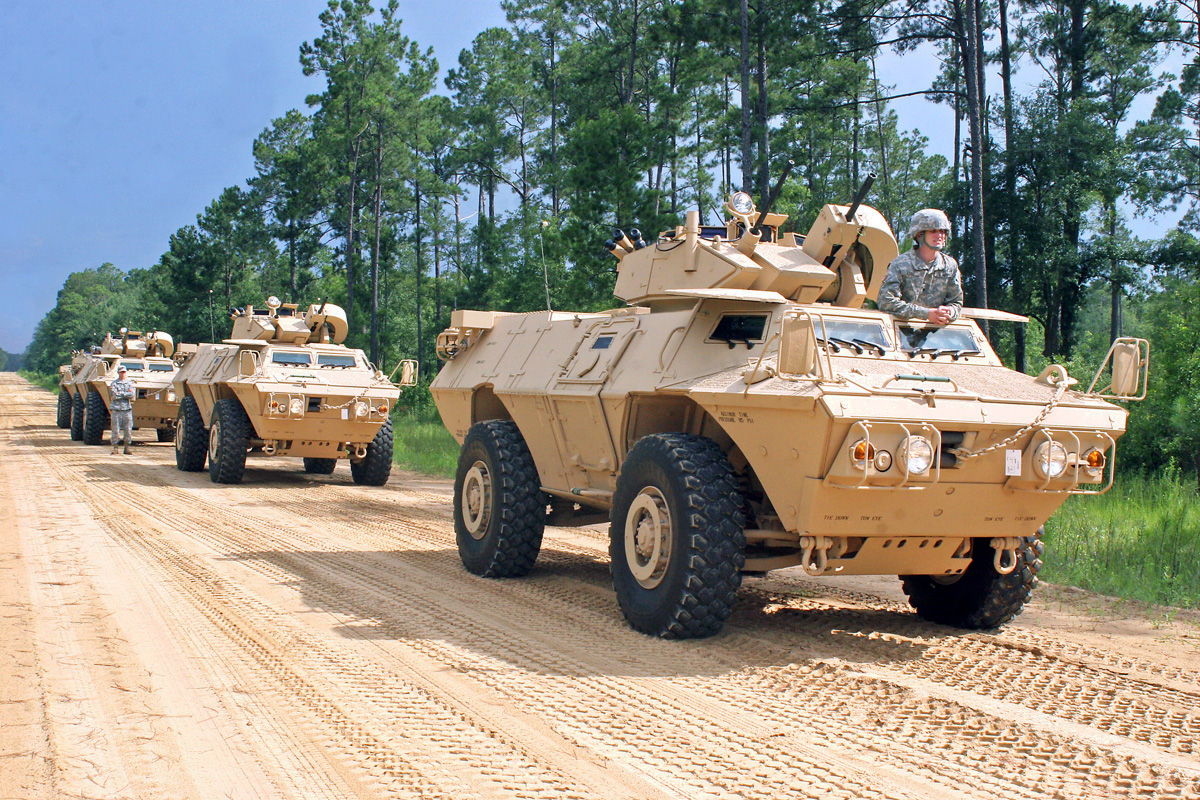
A United States Army National Guard M1117 armoured security vehicle

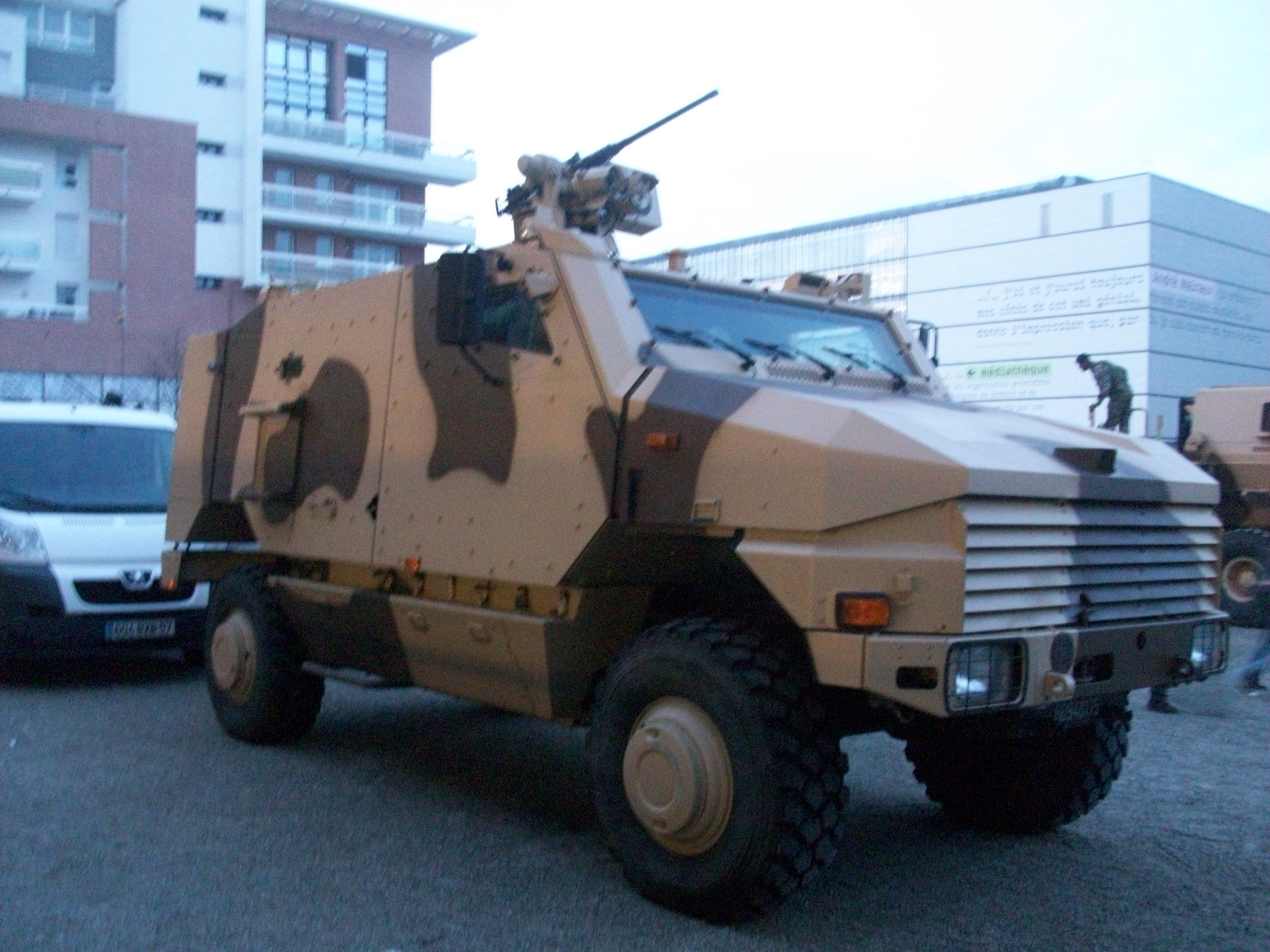
A French Nexter Aravis in Strasbourg

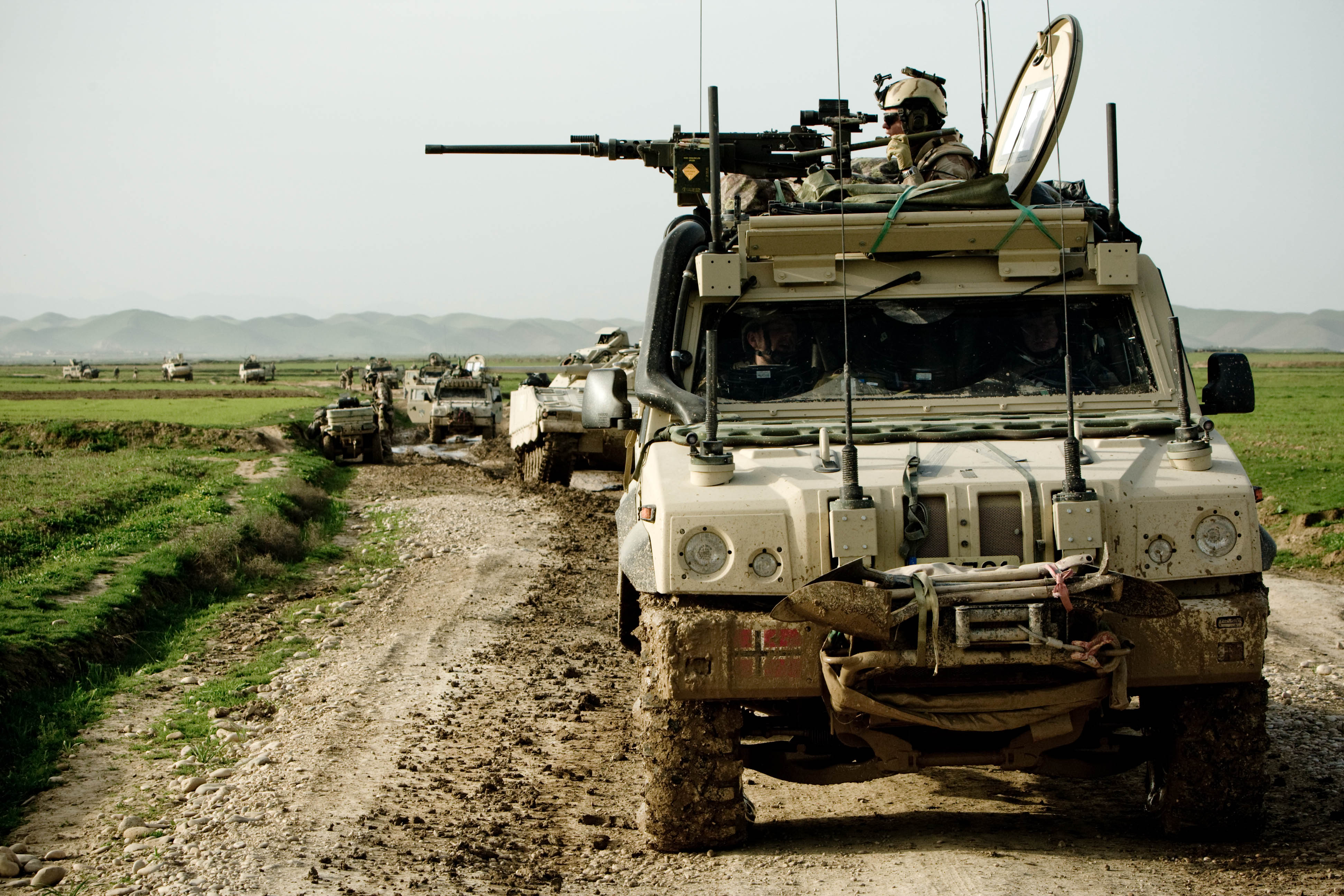
Norwegian soldiers running operations in an Iveco LMV in Faryab province, Afghanistan. The Iveco LMV is widely used by European militaries.

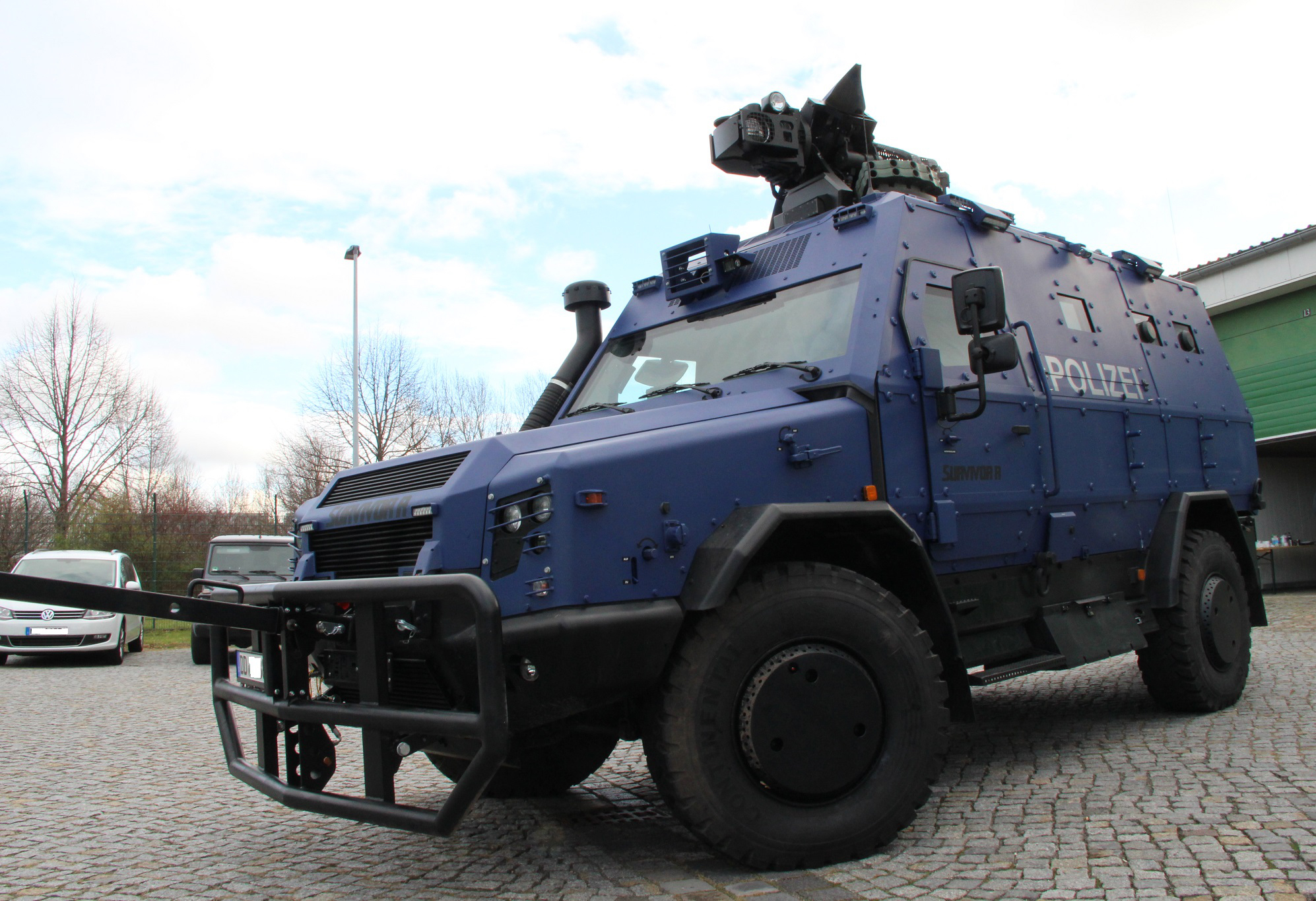
An RMMV Survivor R used by the Saxony State Police. In this configuration, it does not feature the .50 machine gun and grenade launcher remote weapon station used in the standard military configuration.

=== Amphibious vehicles ===
Many modern military vehicles, ranging from light wheeled command and reconnaissance, through armoured personnel carriers and tanks, are manufactured with amphibious capabilities. Contemporary wheeled armoured amphibians include the French Véhicule de l'Avant Blindé and Véhicule Blindé Léger. The latter is a small, lightly armoured 4×4 all-terrain vehicle that is fully amphibious and can swim at 5.4 km/h. The VAB (Véhicule de l'Avant Blindé – 'armoured vanguard vehicle') is a fully amphibious armoured personnel carrier powered in the water by two water jets, that entered service in 1976 and produced in numerous configurations, ranging from basic personnel carrier, anti-tank missile platform.

During the Cold War the Soviet bloc states developed a number of amphibious APCs, fighting vehicles and tanks, both wheeled and tracked. Most of the vehicles the Soviets designed were amphibious, or could ford deep water. Wheeled examples are the BRDM-1 and BRDM-2 4x4 armoured scout cars, as well as the BTR-60, BTR-70, BTR-80, BTR-94 and BTR-90 8x8 armoured personnel carriers.

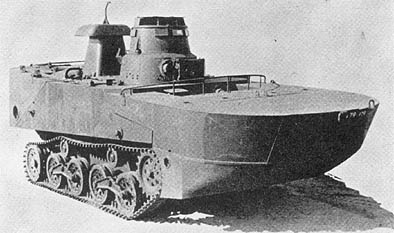
Type 2 Ka-Mi tank with flotation sections attached

During the 1930s and 1940s, Japan produced a number of amphibious tank designs, including prototypes such as the Sumida amphibious armored car (AMP), SR I-Go, SR II Ro-Go, SR III Ha-Go, Type 1 Mi-Sha (a/k/a Type 1 Ka-Mi) and Type 5 To-Ku. Production amphibious tanks during World War II included the Type 2 Ka-Mi, and Type 3 Ka-Chi; production amphibious transports included the F B swamp vehicle and Type 4 Ka-Tsu APC. All production units were for use by the Japanese Special Naval Landing Forces in campaigns in the Pacific with amphibious operations.

The United States started developing a long line of Landing Vehicle Tracked (LVT) designs from c. 1940. The US Marine Corps currently uses the AAV7-A1 Assault Amphibious Vehicle, which was to be succeeded by the Expeditionary Fighting Vehicle, which was capable of planing on water and can achieve water speeds of 37–46 km/h. The EFV project has been cancelled.

A significant number of tracked armoured vehicles that are primarily intended for land-use, have some amphibious capability, tactically useful inland, reducing dependence on bridges. They use their tracks, sometimes with added propeller or water jets for propulsion. As long as the banks have a shallow enough slopes to enter or leave the water they can cross rivers and water obstacles.

Some heavy tanks can operate amphibiously with a fabric skirt to add buoyancy. The Sherman DD tank used in the Normandy landings had this setup. When in water the waterproof float screen was raised and propellers deployed. Some modern vehicles use a similar skirt.

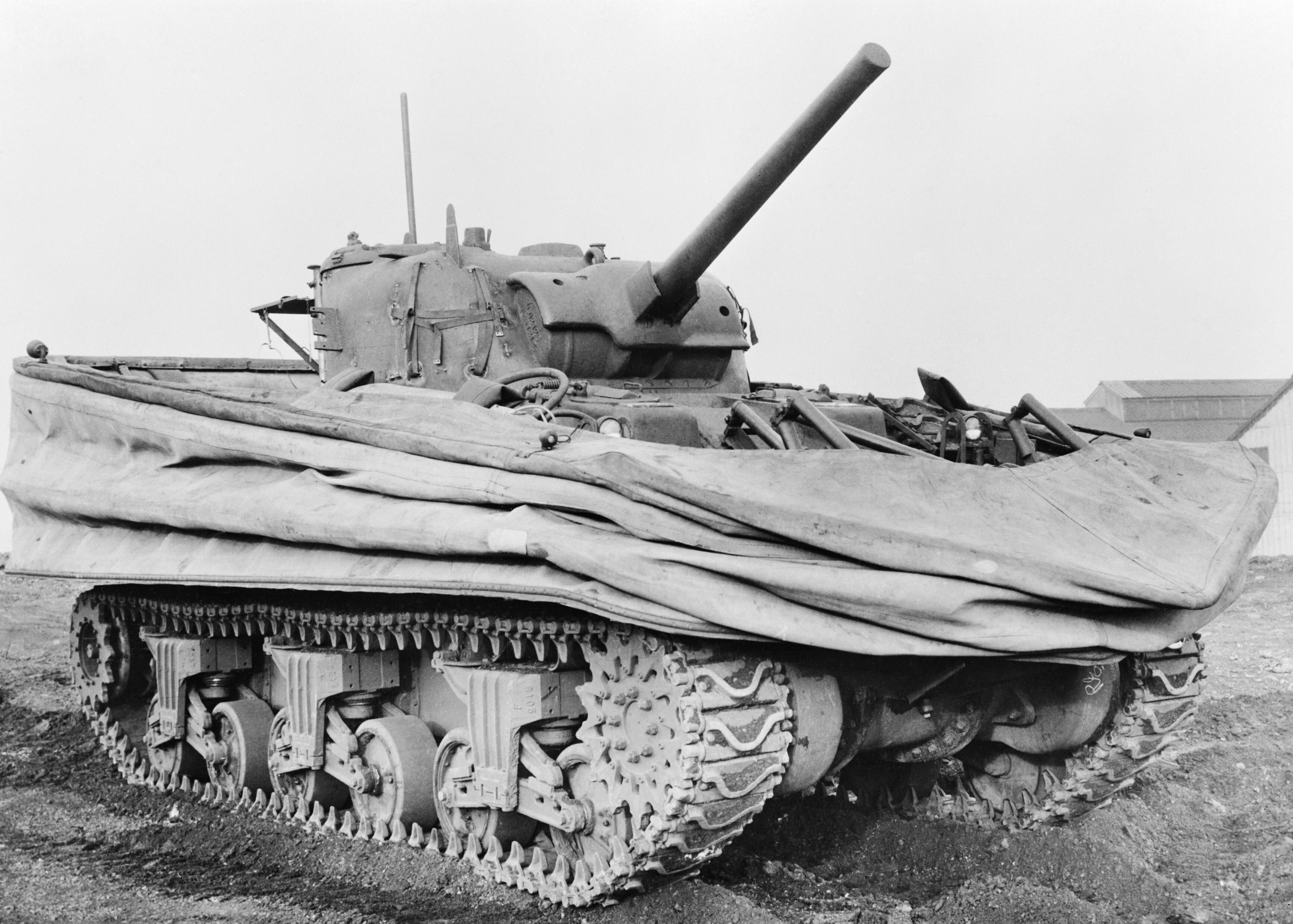
M4 Sherman DD tank during WWII

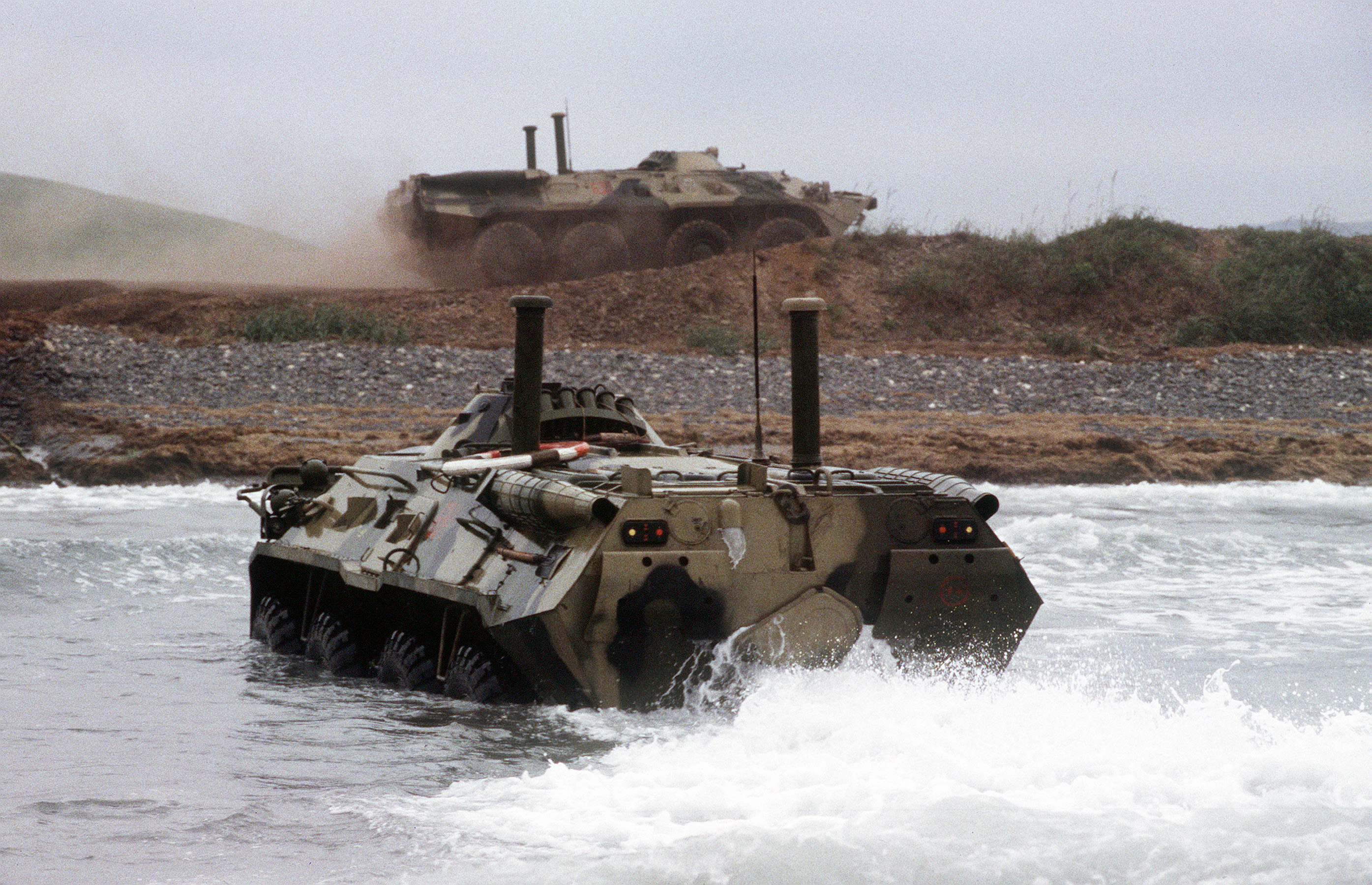
BTR-80s coming ashore, engine snorkels and waterjet deployed

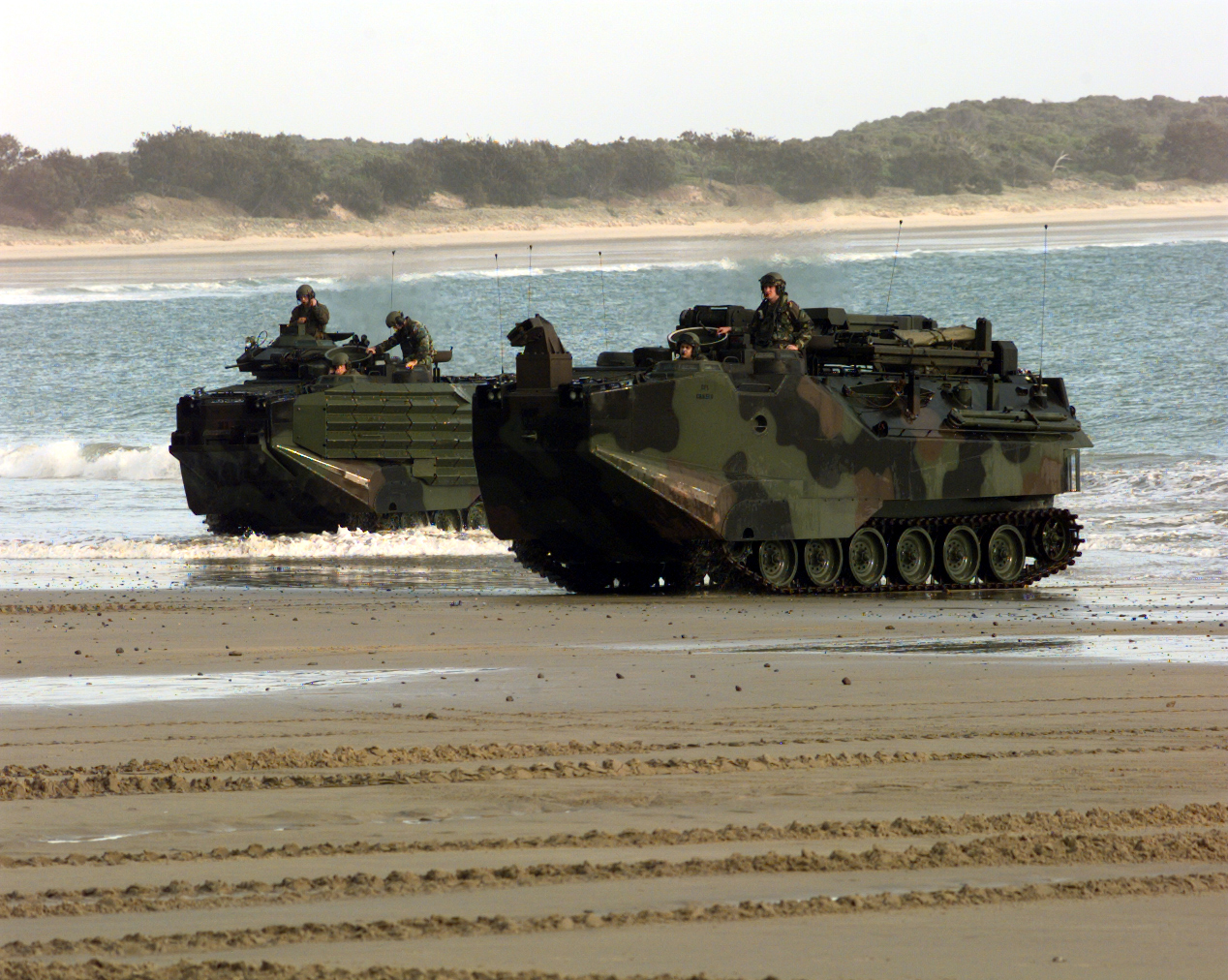
Two U.S. Marine Corps Assault Amphibious Vehicles emerge from the surf onto the sand of Freshwater Beach, Australia

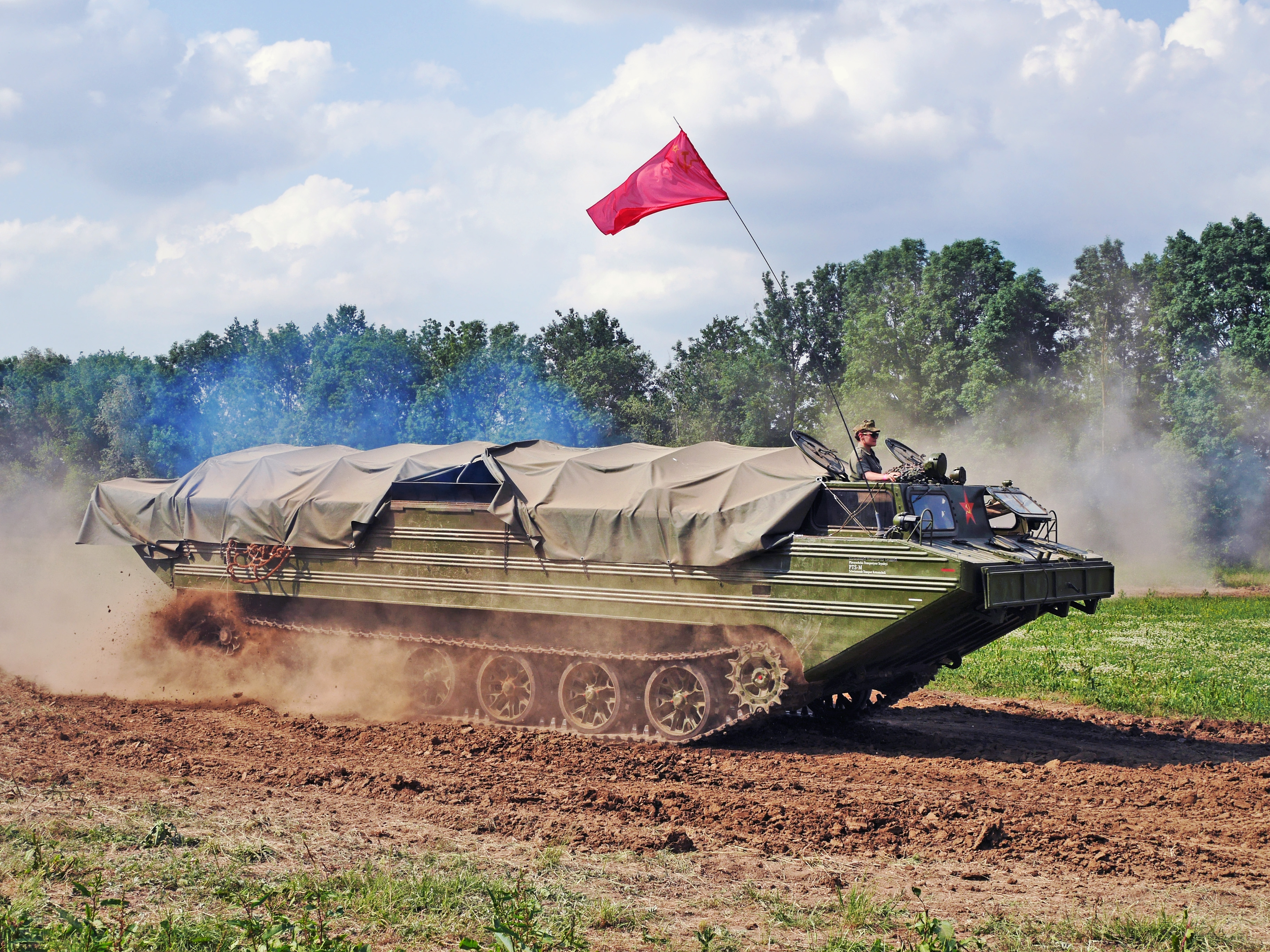
Soviet PTS-M landing craft

=== Airborne vehicles ===
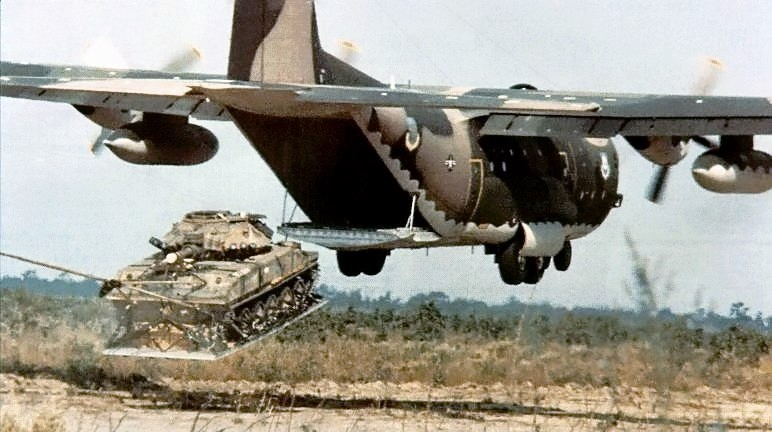
C-130 airdrops an M551 light tank

Lightweight armoured fighting vehicles designed or modified to be carried by aircraft and delivered by air drop, helicopter lift, glider, or air landing with infantry to provide heavier tactical firepower and mobility. The air-equivalent to amphibious vehicles, the main advantage of airborne forces is their ability to be deployed into combat zones without land passage, as long as the airspace is accessible. Airborne vehicles are limited only by the tonnage capacity of their transport aircraft. Airborne vehicles typically lack the armour and supplies necessary for prolonged combat, so they are utilized for establishing an airhead to bring in larger forces before carrying out other combat objectives. One modern example is the German Wiesel AWC. The USA also created the M22 Locust as a way to aid paratroopers/ being paradropped in as it was very lightly armoured and very small.

=== Armoured engineering vehicle ===
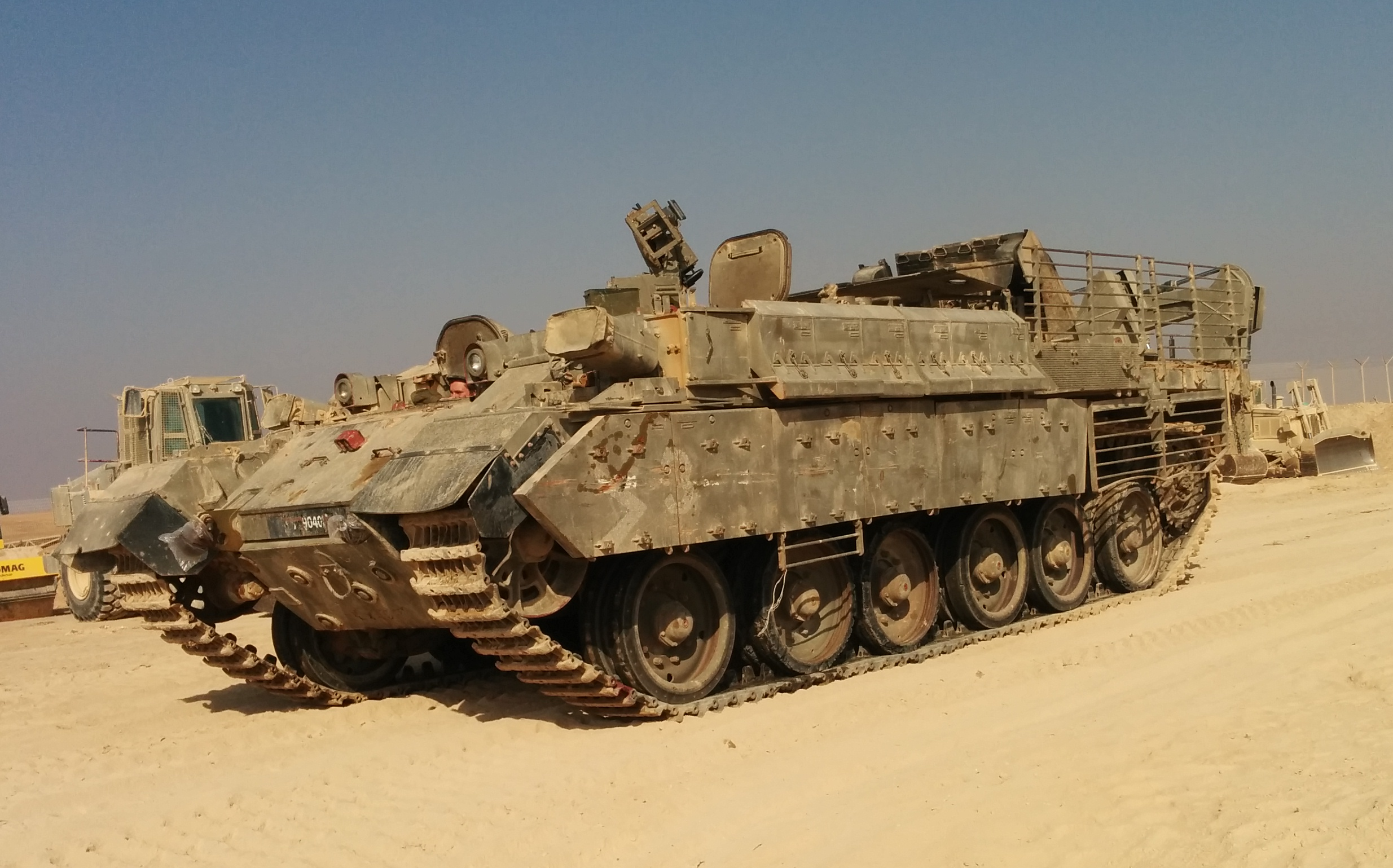
IDF Puma combat engineering vehicle

Modern engineering AFV's utilize chassis based on main battle tank platforms: these vehicles are as well armoured and protected as tanks, designed to keep up with tanks, breach obstacles to help tanks get to wherever it needs to be, perform utility functions necessary to expedite mission objectives of tanks, and to conduct other earth-moving and engineering work on the battlefield. These vehicles go by different names depending upon the country of use or manufacture. In the United States the term "combat engineer vehicle (CEV)" is used, in the United Kingdom the term "Armoured Vehicle Royal Engineers (AVRE)" is used, while in Canada and other commonwealth nations the term "armoured engineer vehicle (AEV)" is used. There is no set template for what such a vehicle will look like, yet likely features include a large dozer blade or mine ploughs, a large calibre demolition cannon, augers, winches, excavator arms and cranes, or lifting booms.

Although the term "armoured engineer vehicle" is used specifically to describe these multi-purpose tank-based engineering vehicles, that term is also used more generically in British and Commonwealth militaries to describe all heavy tank-based engineering vehicles used in the support of mechanized forces. Thus, "armoured engineer vehicle" used generically would refer to AEV, AVLB, Assault Breachers, and so on. Good examples of this type of vehicle include the UK Trojan AVRE, the Russian IMR, and the US M728 Combat Engineer Vehicle.

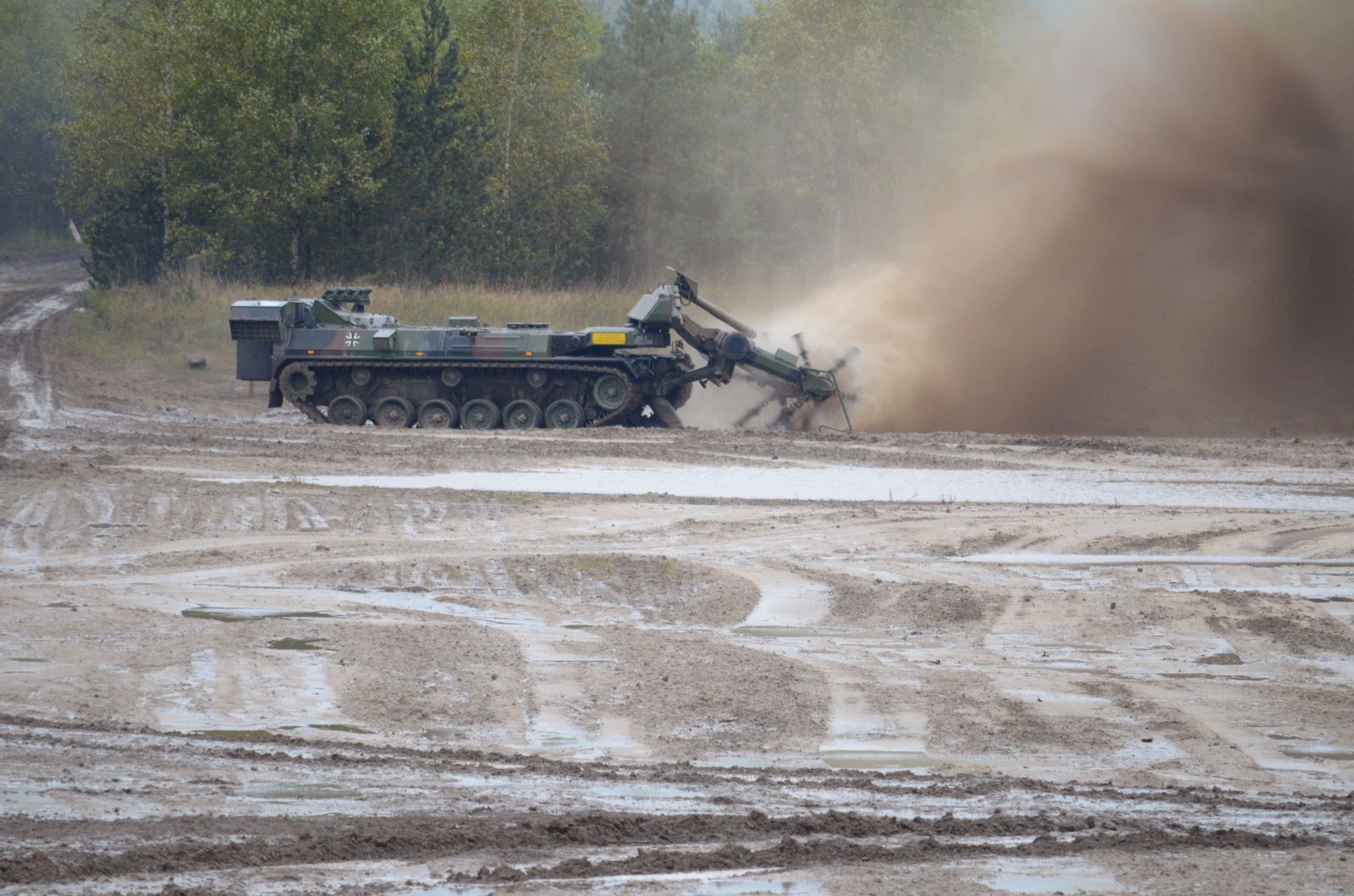
A German army Rheinmetall Keiler. It uses a heavy-duty rotor-powered mine flail, which causes mines it comes in contact with to safely detonate.

==== Breaching vehicle ====
A breaching vehicle is especially designed to clear pathways for troops and other vehicles through minefields and along roadside bombs and other improvised explosive devices. These vehicles are equipped with mechanical or other means for the breaching of man-made obstacles. Common types of breaching vehicles include mechanical flails, mine plough vehicles, and mine roller vehicles.

==== Armoured recovery vehicle ====
An armoured recovery vehicle (ARV) is a type of vehicle recovery armoured fighting vehicle used to repair battle- or mine-damaged as well as broken-down armoured vehicles during combat, or to tow them out of the danger zone for more extensive repairs. To this end the term armoured repair and recovery vehicle (ARRV) is also used.

ARVs are normally built on the chassis of a main battle tank (MBT), but some are also constructed on the basis of other armoured fighting vehicles, mostly armoured personnel carriers (APCs). ARVs are usually built on the basis of a vehicle in the same class as they are supposed to recover; a tank-based ARV is used to recover tanks, while an APC-based one recovers APCs, but does not have the power to tow a much heavier tank.

==== Combat engineer section carriers ====
Combat engineer section carriers are used to transport sappers (combat engineers) and can be fitted with bulldozers' blades and other mine-breaching devices. They are often used as APCs because of their carrying ability and heavy protection. They are usually armed with machine guns and grenade launchers and usually tracked to provide enough tractive force to push blades and rakes. Some examples are the U.S. M113 APC, IDF Puma, Nagmachon, Husky, and U.S. M1132 ESV (a Stryker variant).

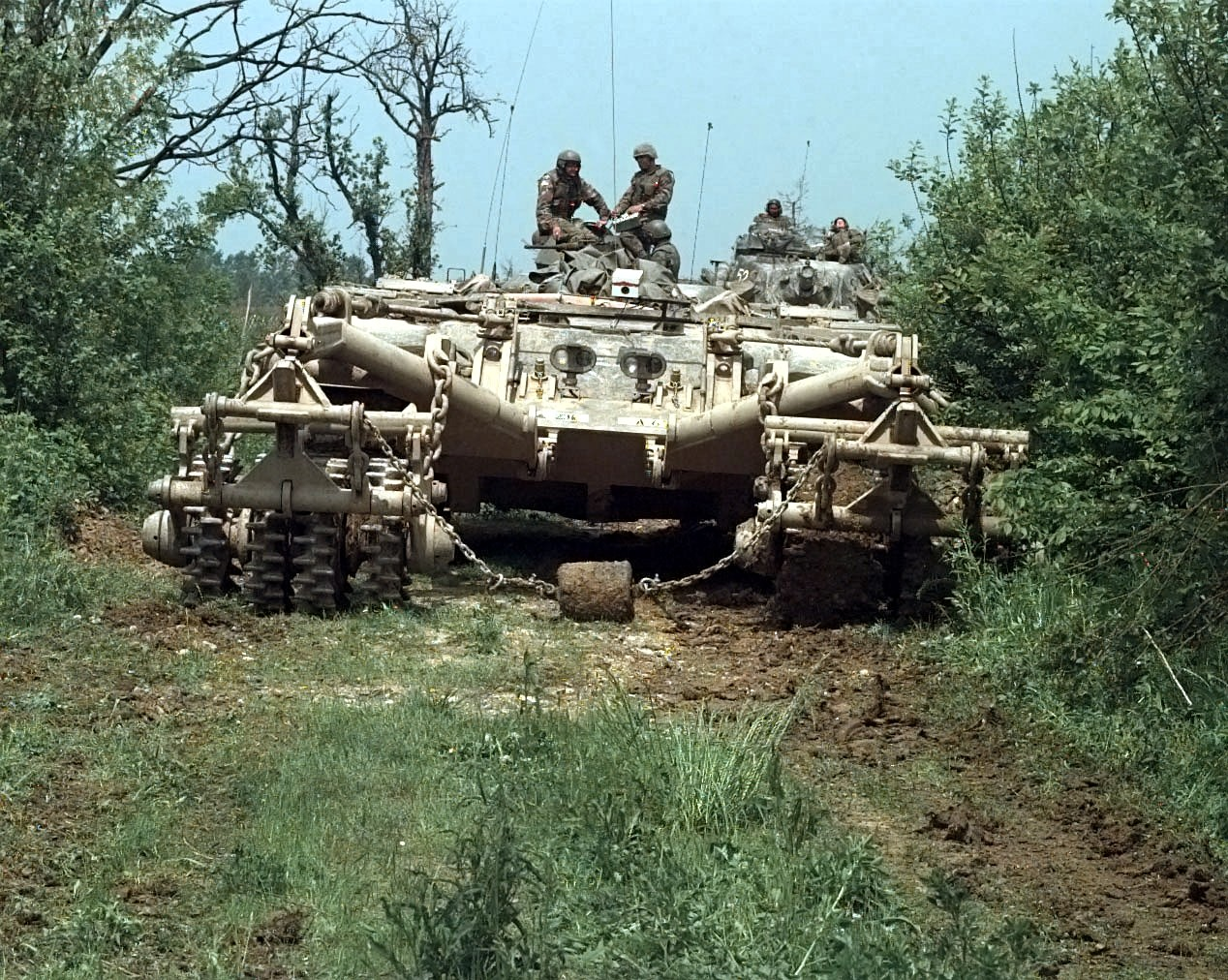
A remotely controlled Panther armoured mine clearing vehicle leads a column down a road in Bosnia and Herzegovina, 16 May 1996.

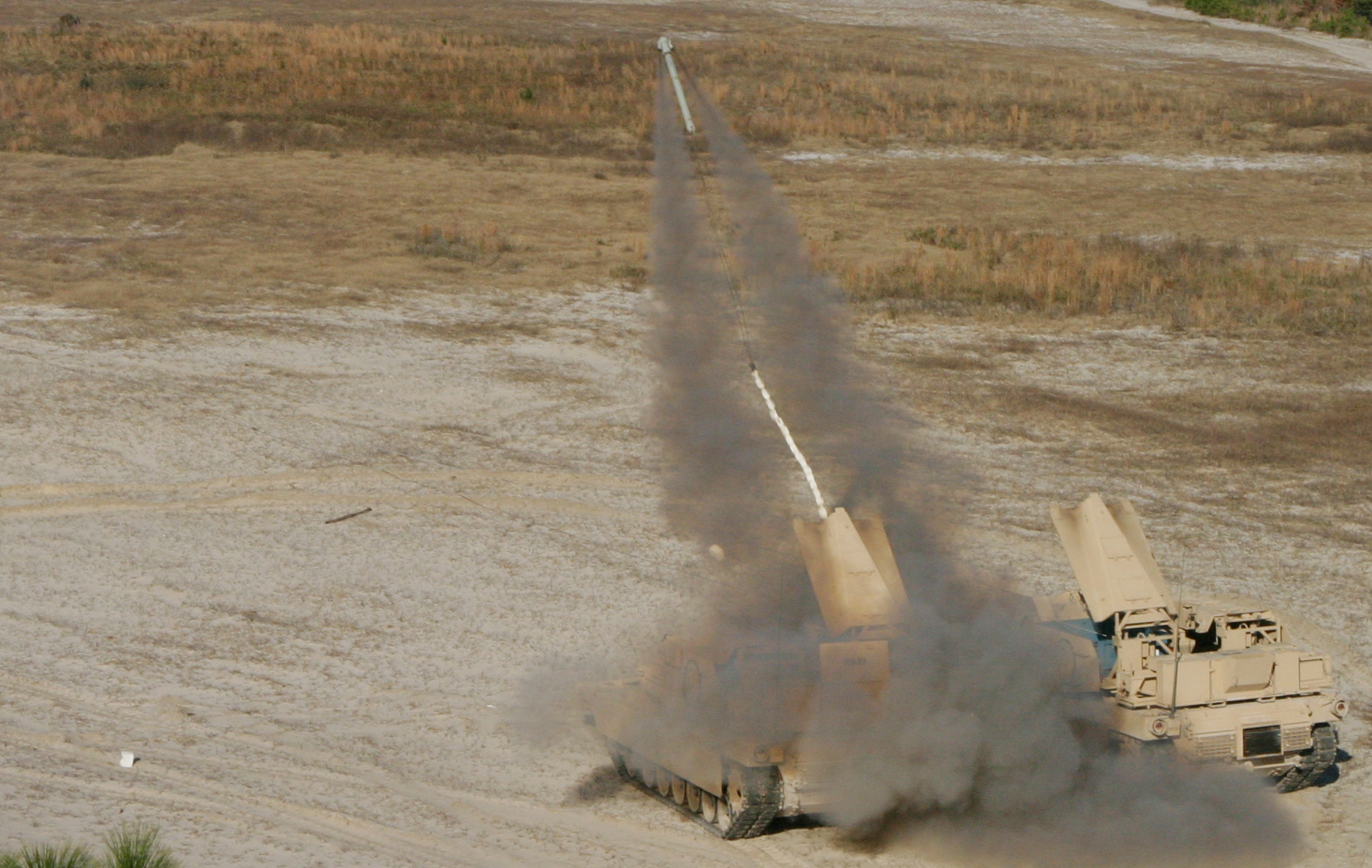
Marines with 2nd Combat Engineer Battalion launch a M58 MICLIC from an M1150 Assault Breacher Vehicle

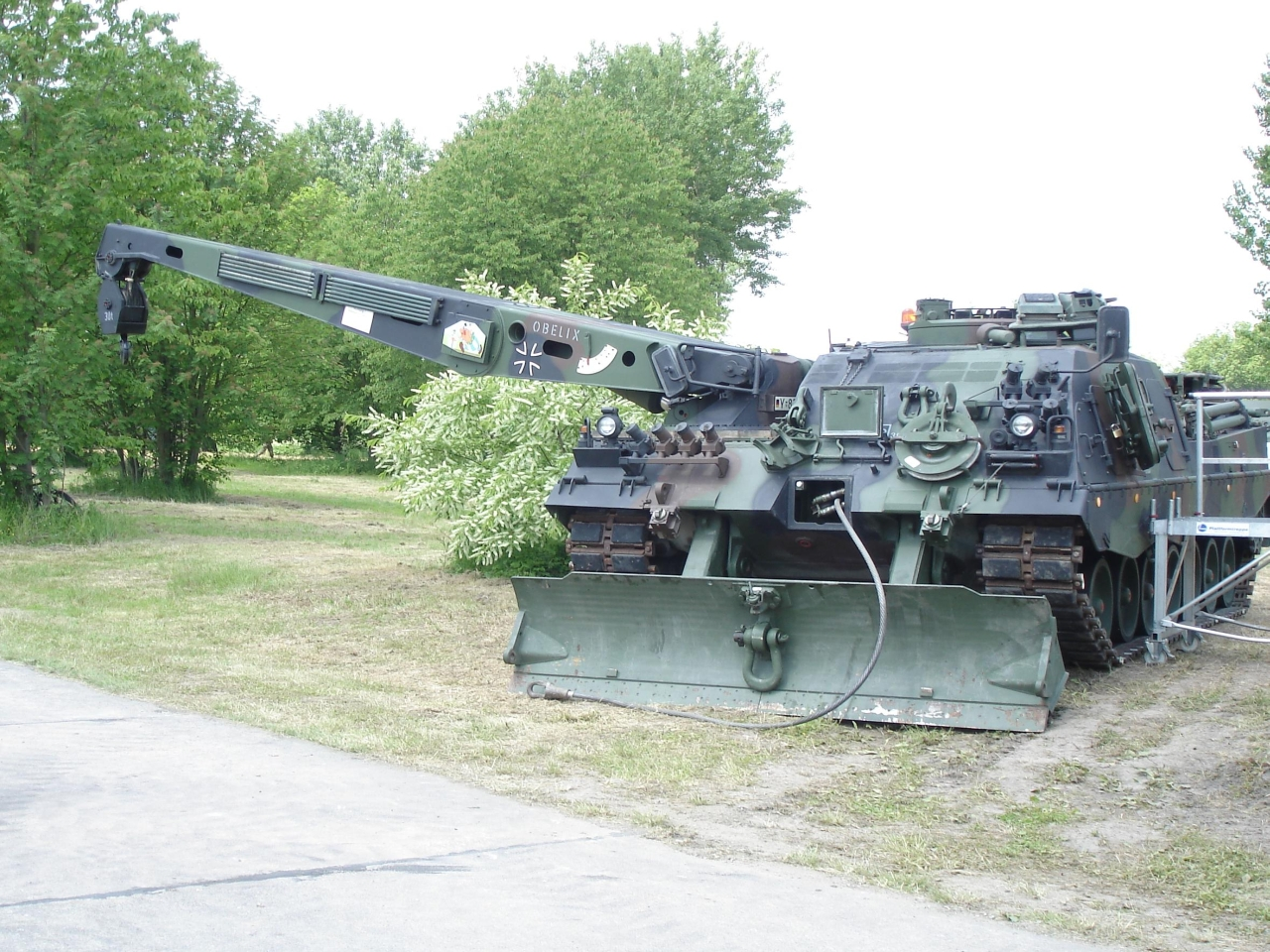
BPz3 "Büffel" armoured recovery vehicle, German Army

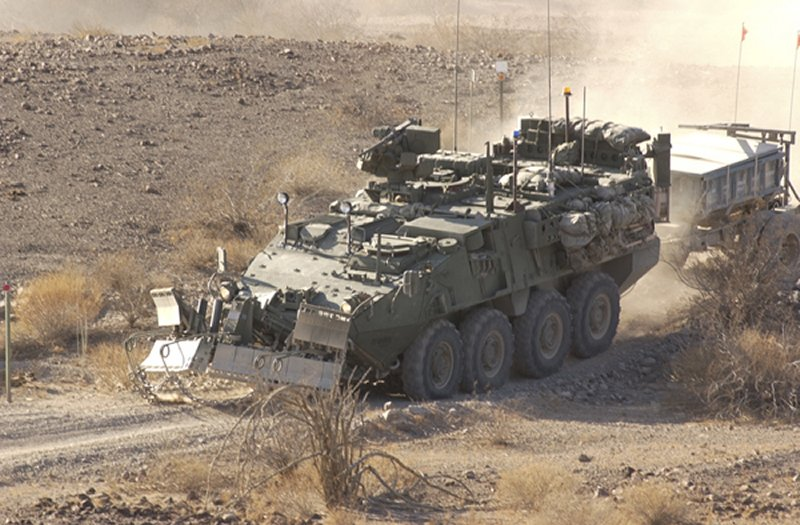
An M1132 engineer squad vehicle (ESV) issued to combat engineer squads in the US Army Stryker brigade combat teams

=== Air defence vehicles ===
An anti-aircraft vehicle, also known as a self-propelled anti-aircraft gun (SPAAG) or self-propelled air defense system (SPAD), is a mobile vehicle with a dedicated anti-aircraft capability. Specific weapon systems used include machine guns, anti-aircraft autocannons, larger anti-air guns, or surface-to-air-missiles, and some mount both guns and longer-ranged missiles (e.g. the Pantsir-S1). Platforms used include both trucks and heavier combat vehicles such as armored personnel carriers and tanks, which add protection from aircraft, artillery, and small arms fire for front line deployment. Anti-aircraft guns are usually mounted in a quickly-traversing turret with a high rate of elevation, for tracking fast-moving aircraft. They are often in dual or quadruple mounts, allowing a high rate of fire. In addition, most anti-aircraft guns can be used in a direct-fire role against surface targets to great effect. In the early 21st century, missiles (generally mounted on similar turrets) largely supplanted anti-aircraft guns, though guns have recently shown revived utility against slow, low-flying drones.

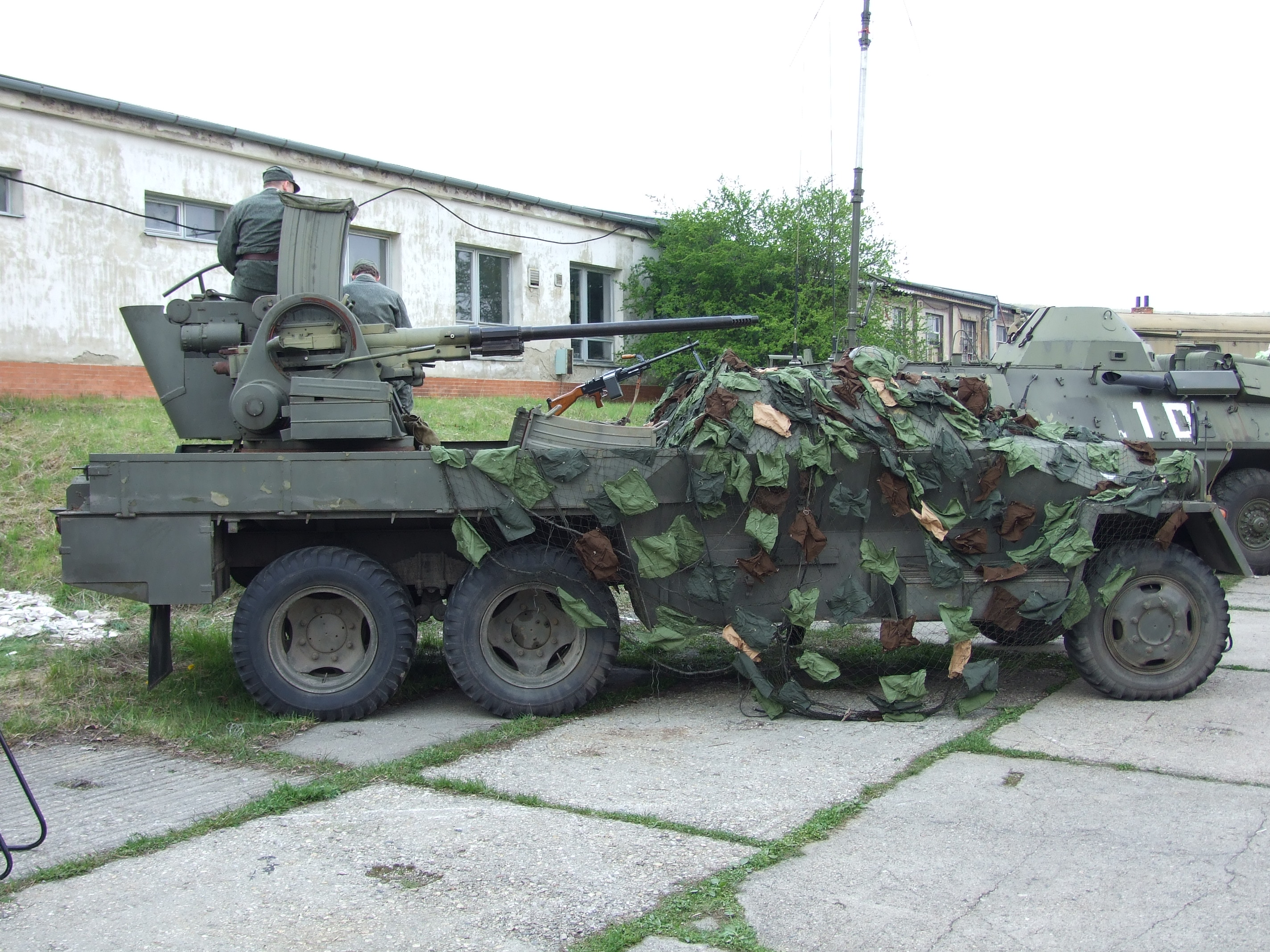
Czechoslovak self-propelled anti-aircraft gun M53/59 Praga developed in the late 1950s

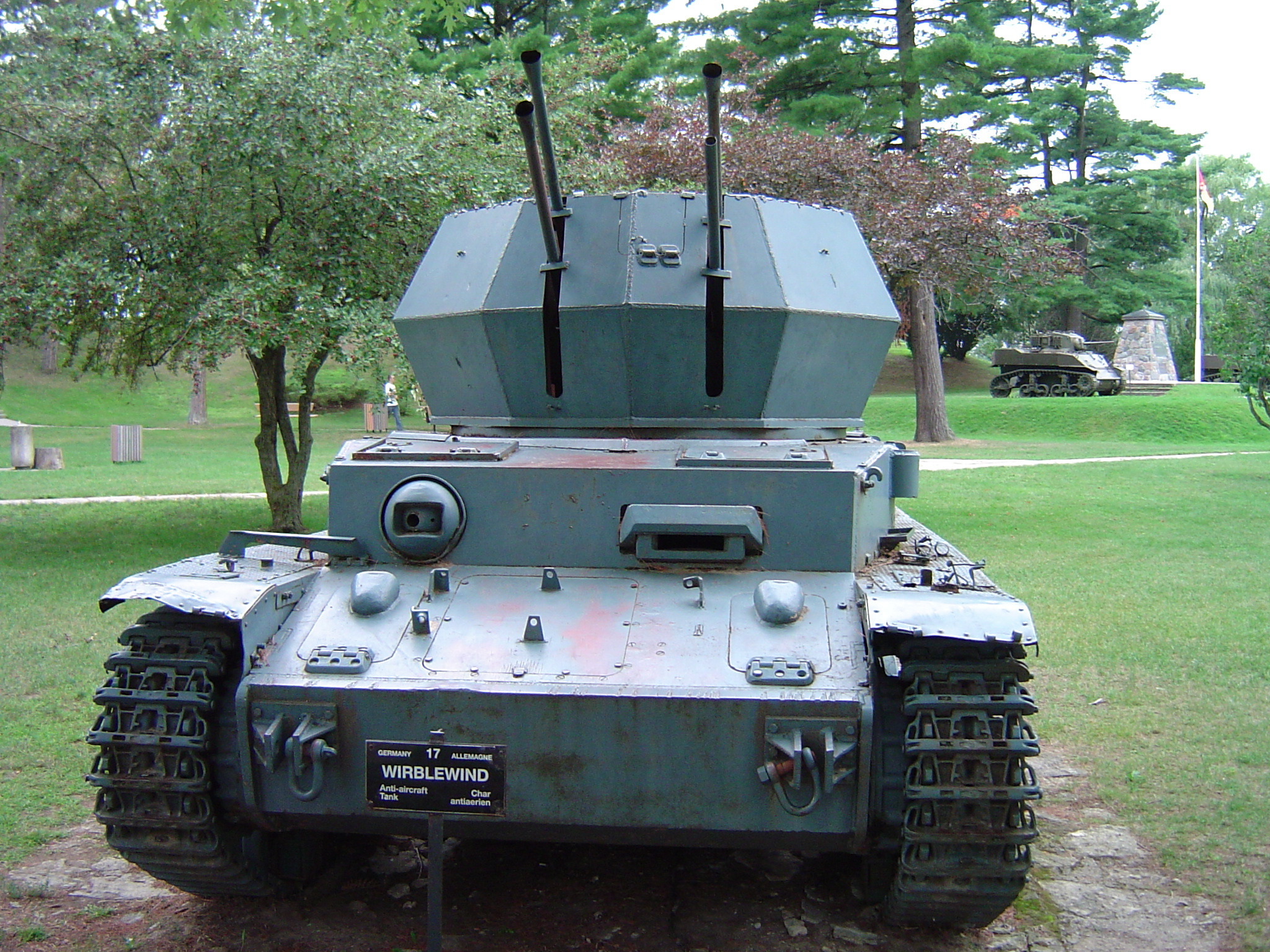
German Wirbelwind, a 20 mm Flakvierling quadmount on a Panzer IV chassis

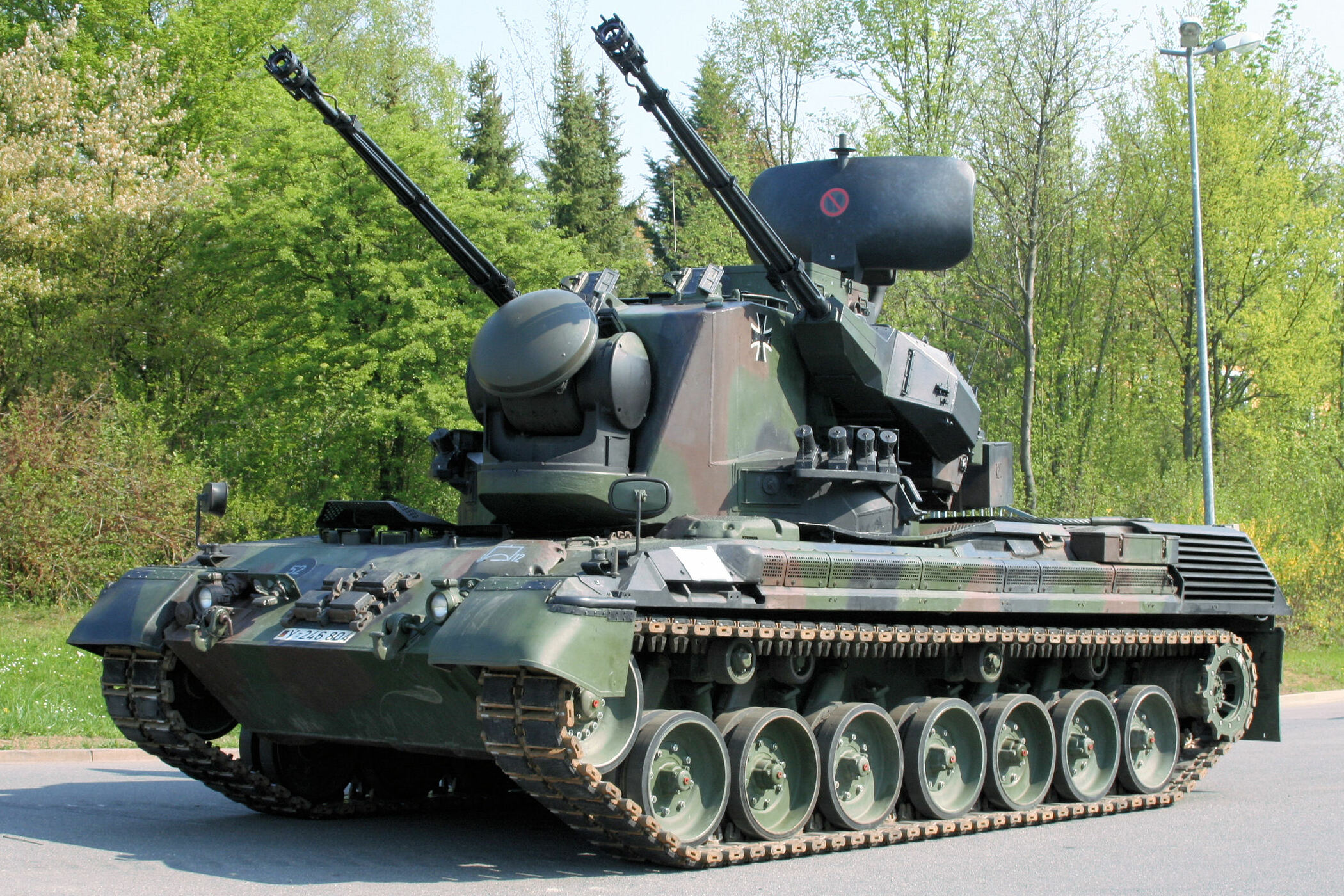
Flakpanzer Gepard, Germany

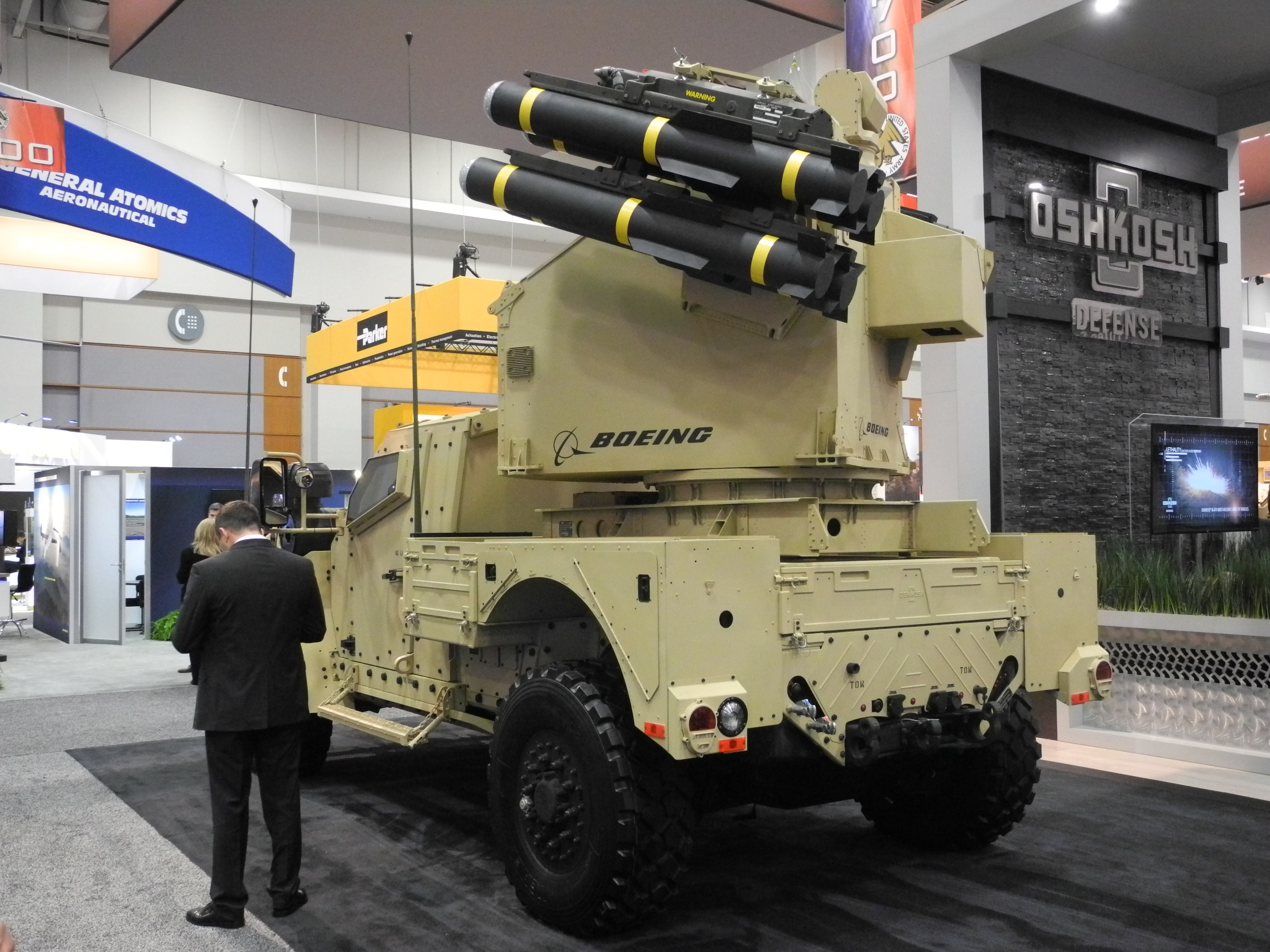
At AUSA 2017, a JLTV Utility variant mounting Boeing's SHORAD Launcher

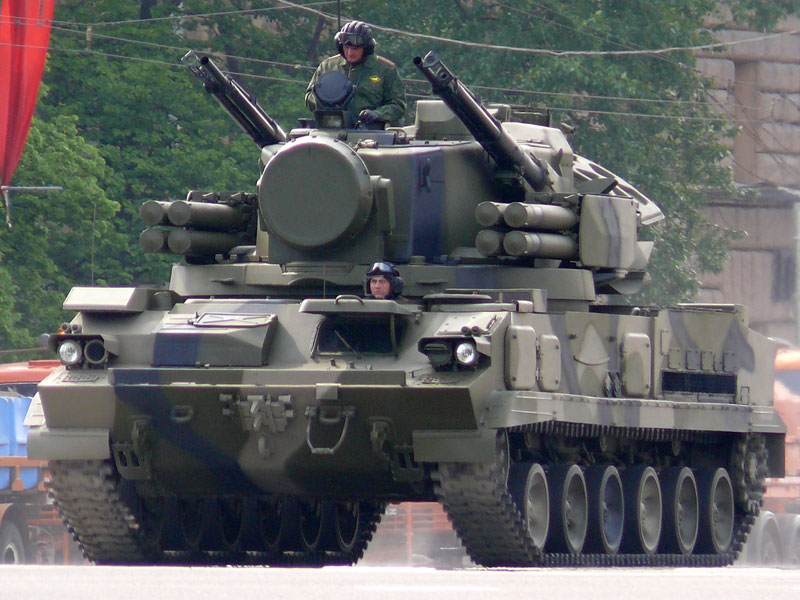
Typical of more modern designs, the Tunguska-M1 mounts both missiles and autocannons.

=== Self-propelled artillery ===
Self-propelled artillery vehicles give mobility to artillery. Within the term are covered self-propelled guns (or howitzers) and rocket artillery. They are highly mobile, usually based on tracked chassis carrying either a large howitzer or other field gun or alternatively a mortar or some form of rocket or missile launcher. They are usually used for long-range indirect bombardment support on the battlefield.

In the past, self-propelled artillery has included direct-fire "Gun Motor Carriage" vehicles, such as assault guns and tank destroyers (also known as self-propelled anti-tank guns). These have been heavily armoured vehicles, the former providing danger-close fire-support for infantry and the latter acting as specialized anti-tank vehicles.

Modern self-propelled artillery vehicles may superficially resemble tanks, but they are generally lightly armoured, too lightly to survive in direct-fire combat. However, they protect their crews against shrapnel and small arms and are therefore usually included as armoured fighting vehicles. Many are equipped with machine guns for defence against enemy infantry.

The key advantage of self-propelled over towed artillery is that it can be brought into action much faster. Before towed artillery can be used, it has to stop, unlimber and the guns set up. To move position, the guns must be limbered up again and brought – usually towed – to the new location. By comparison, self-propelled artillery in combination with modern communications, can stop at a chosen location and begin firing almost immediately, then quickly move on to a new position. This ability is very useful in a mobile conflict and particularly on the advance.

Conversely, towed artillery was and remains cheaper to build and maintain. It is also lighter and can be taken to places that self-propelled guns cannot reach, so despite the advantages of the self-propelled artillery, towed guns remain in the arsenals of many modern armies.

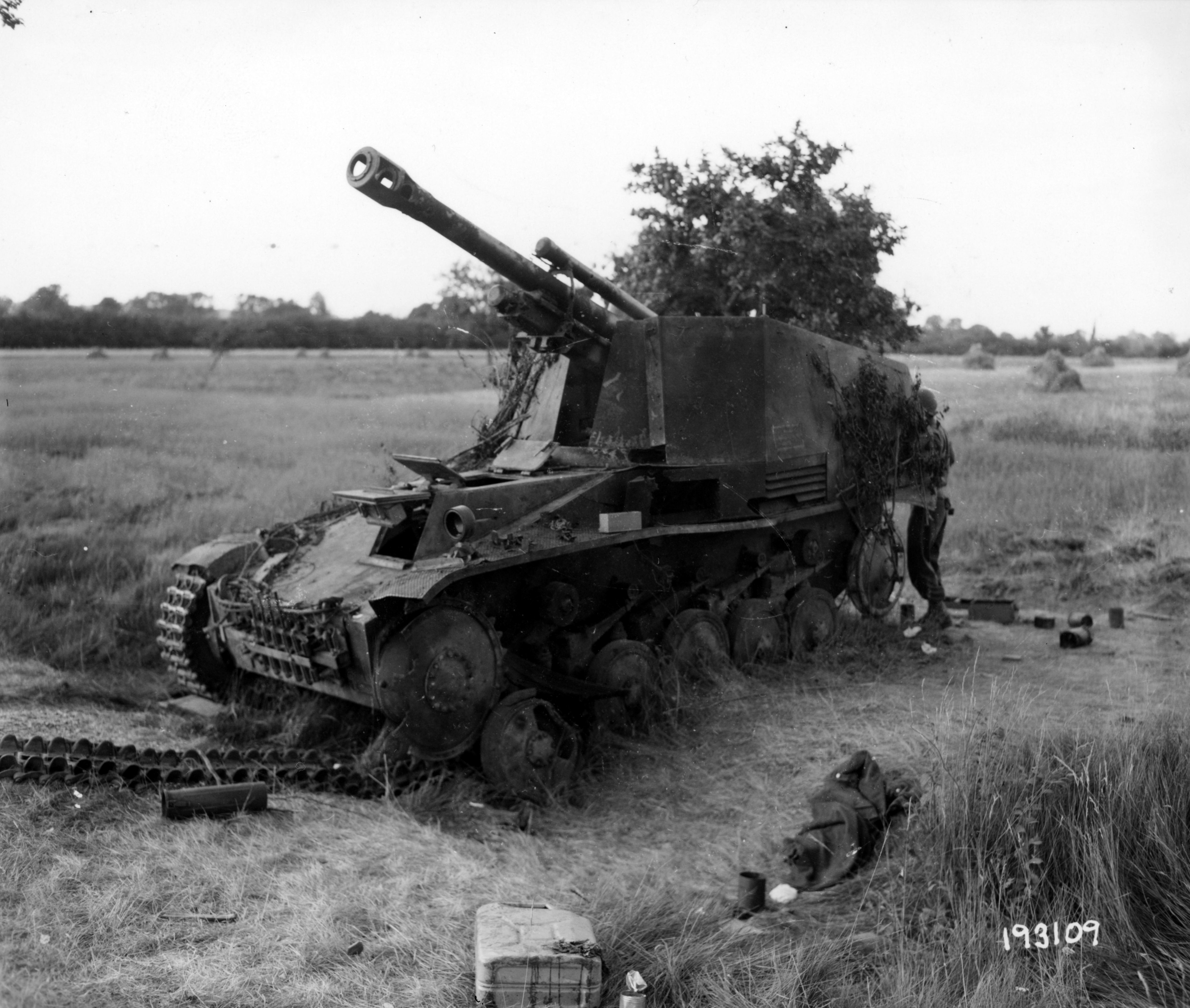
A Wespe destroyed in Normandy, 1944

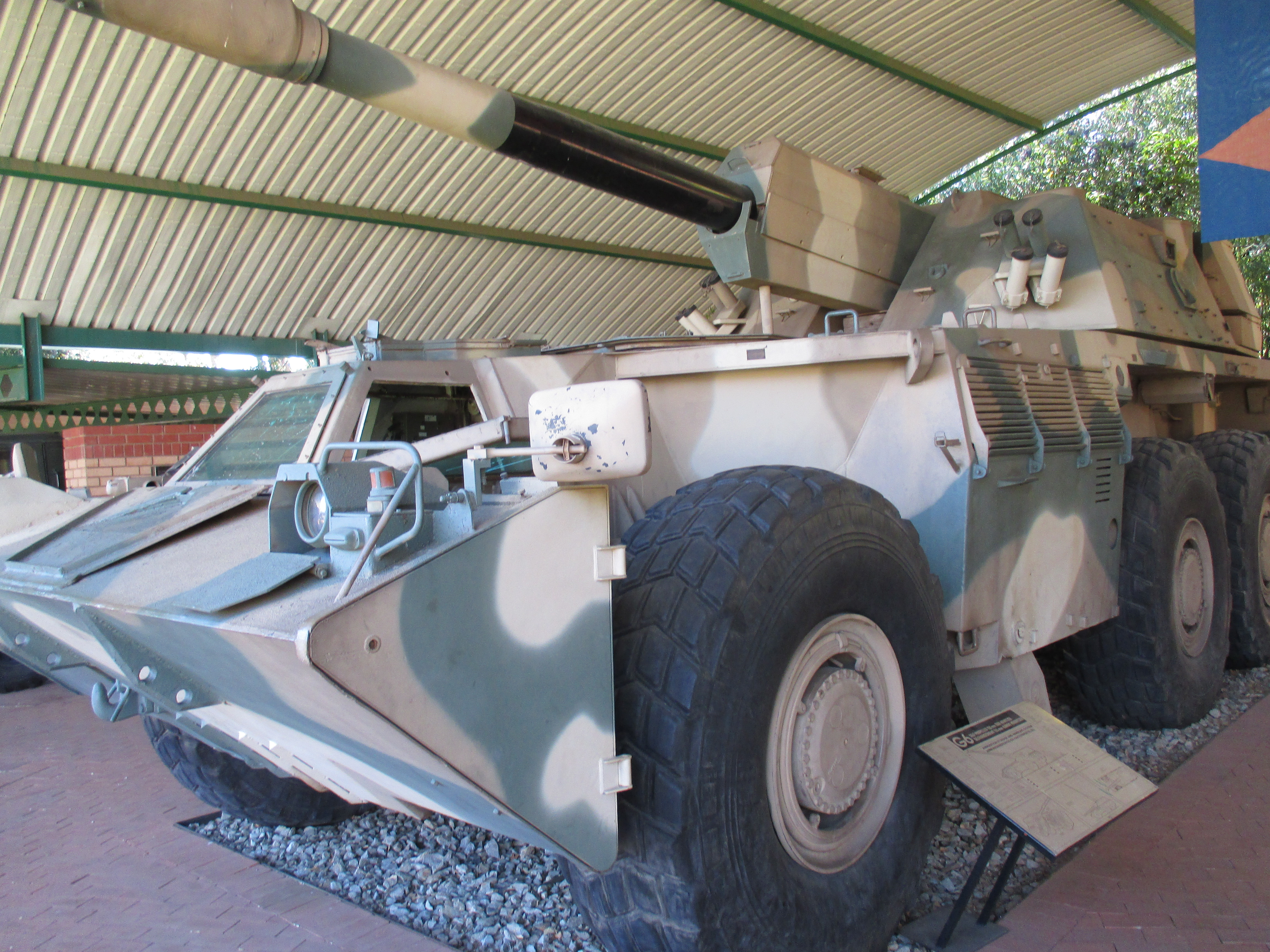
G6 howitzer wheeled SPG

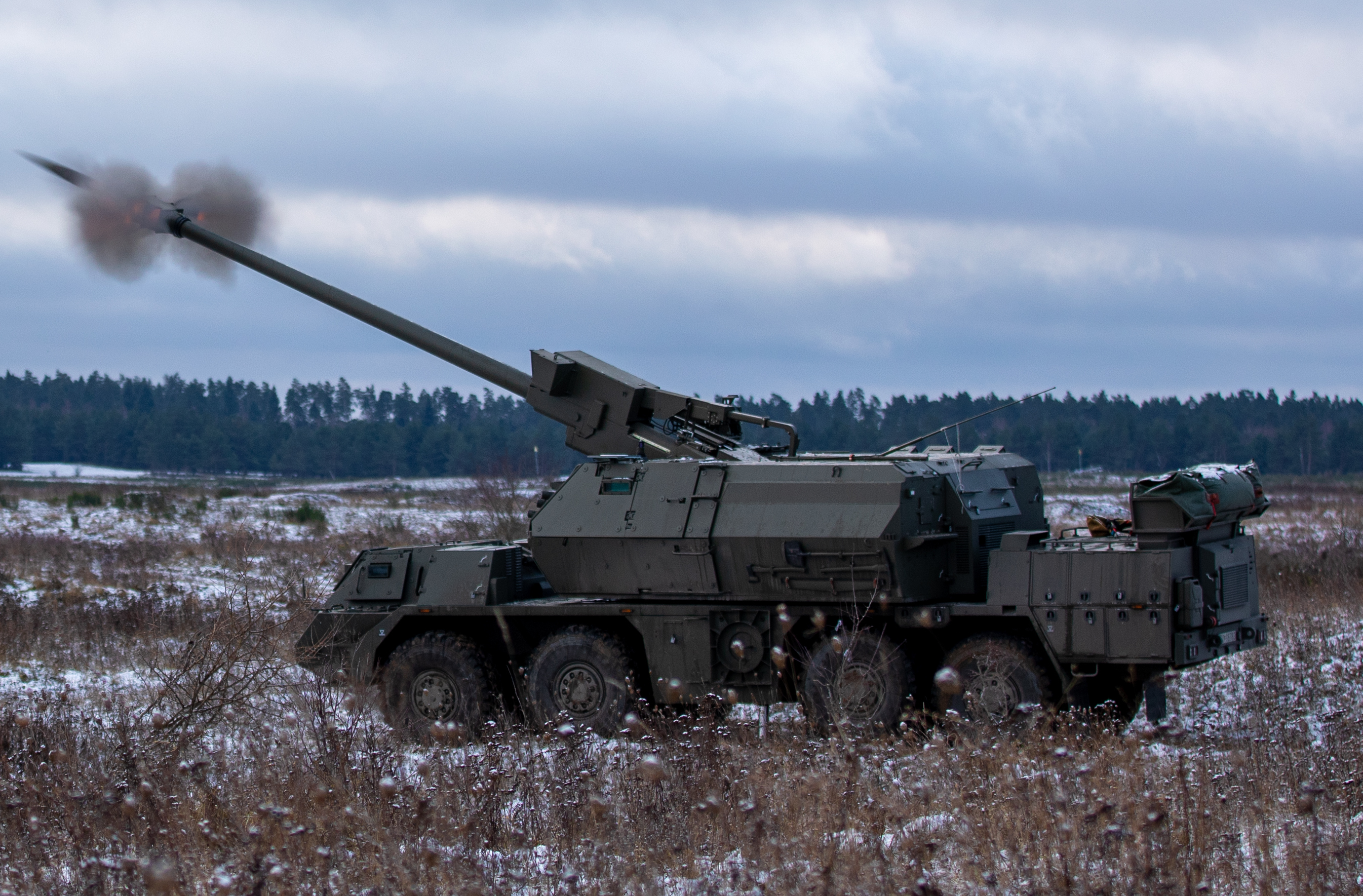
Slovak Self-propelled 155mm Howitzer model 2000 Zuzana

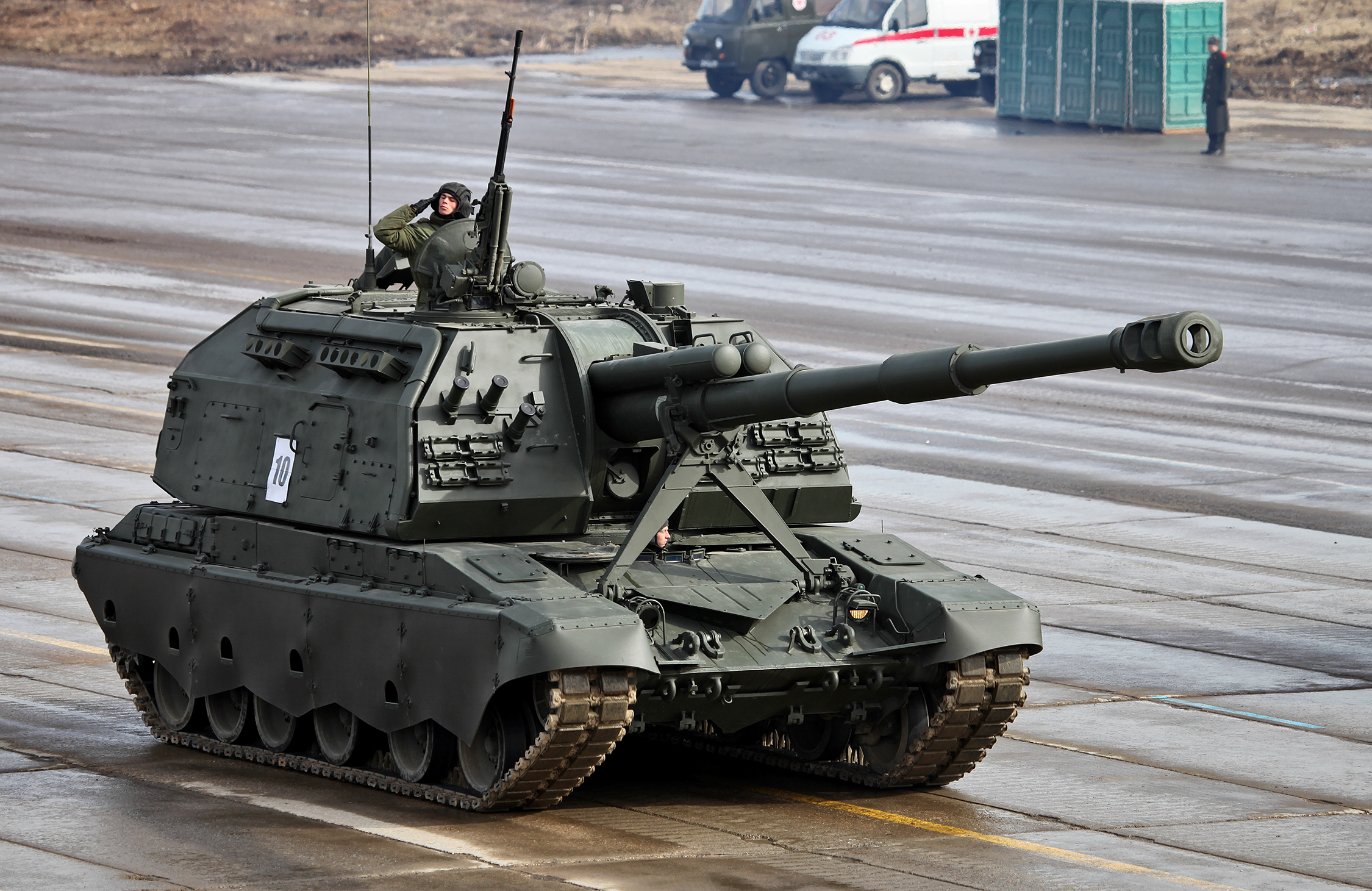
A Russian 2S19 Msta-S in 2014

==== Assault gun ====
An assault gun is a gun or howitzer mounted on a motor vehicle or armoured chassis, designed for use in the direct fire role in support of infantry when attacking other infantry or fortified positions.

Historically, the custom-built fully armoured assault guns usually mounted the gun or howitzer in a fully enclosed casemate on a tank chassis. The use of a casemate instead of a gun turret limited these weapons' field of fire, but allowed a larger gun to be fitted relative to the chassis, more armour to be fitted for the same weight, and provided a cheaper construction. In most cases, these turretless vehicles also presented a lower profile as a target for the enemy.

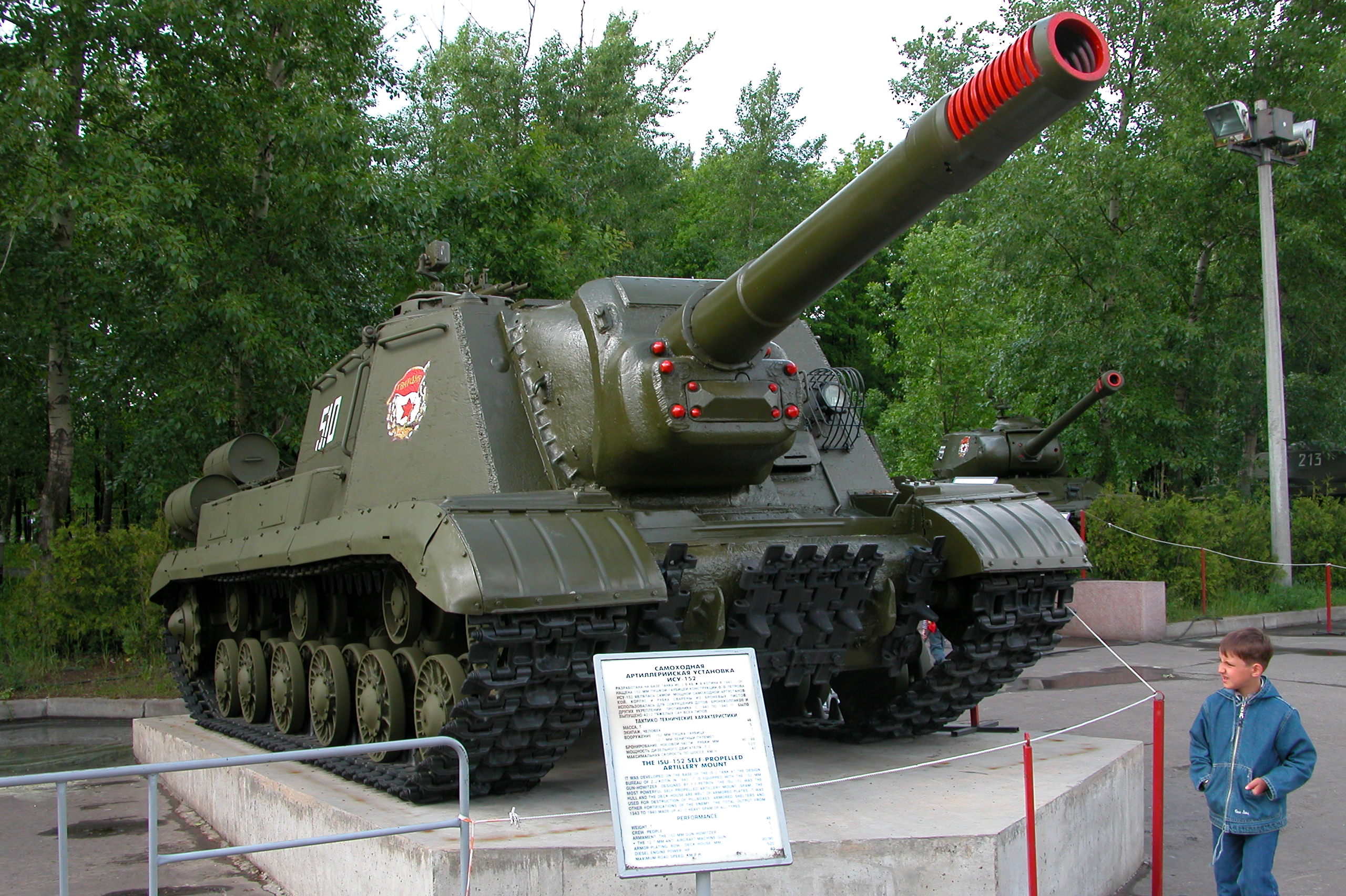
ISU-152K, Victory Park, Moscow, Russia

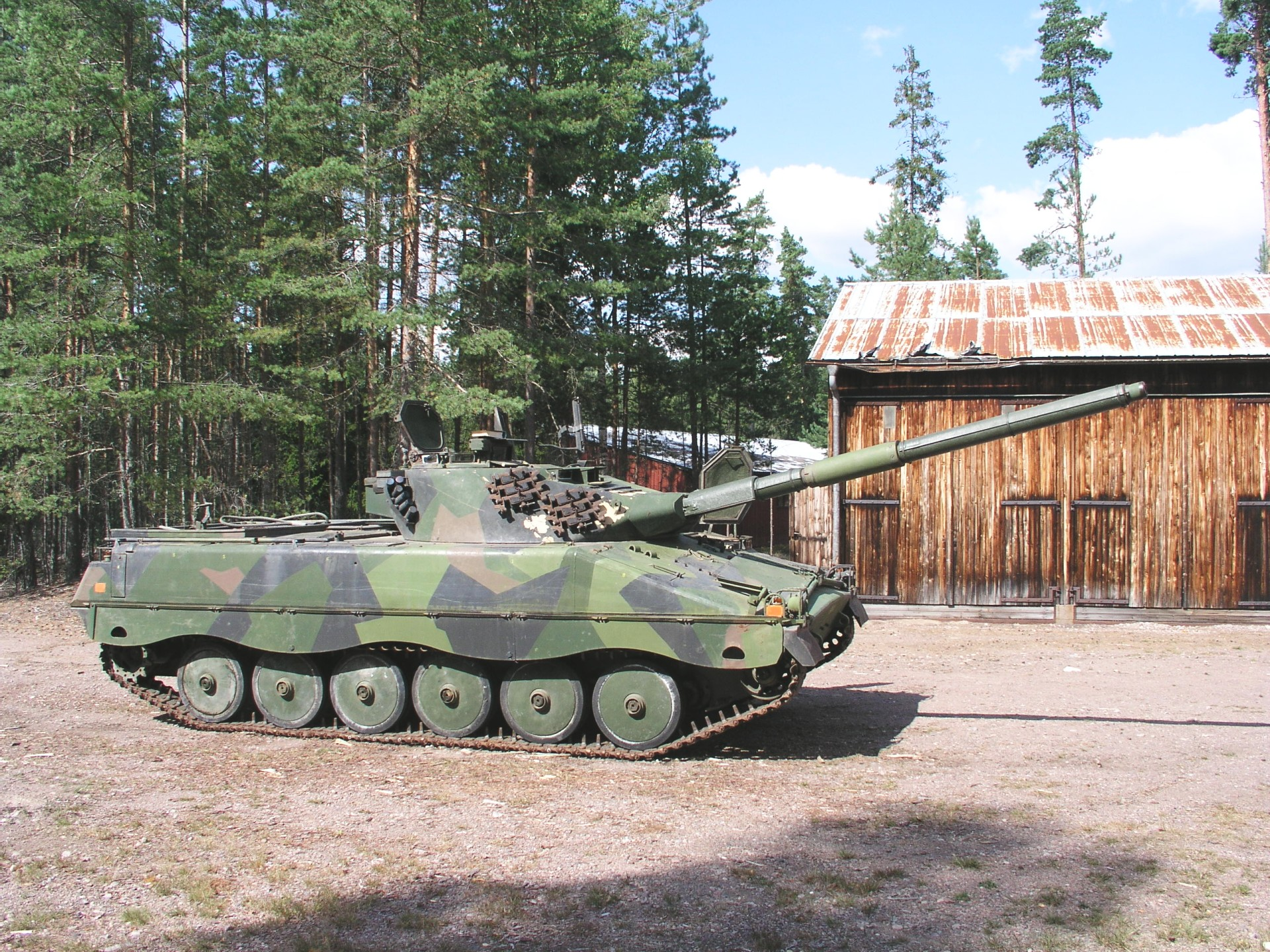
Infanterikanonvagn 91, Swedish turreted amphibious assault gun

==== Mortar carrier ====
A mortar carrier, or self-propelled mortar, is a self-propelled artillery vehicle carrying one or more mortar as its primary weapon. Mortar carriers cannot be fired while on the move and some must be dismounted to fire. In U.S. Army doctrine, mortar carriers provide close and immediate indirect fire support for maneuver units while allowing for rapid displacement and quick reaction to the tactical situation. The ability to relocate not only allows fire support to be provided where it is needed faster, but also allows these units to avoid counter-battery fire. Mortar carriers have traditionally avoided direct contact with the enemy. Many units report never using secondary weapons in combat.

Prior to the Iraq War, American 120 mm mortar platoons reorganized from six M1064 mortar carriers and two M577 fire direction centres (FDC) to four M1064 and one FDC. The urban environment of Iraq made it difficult to utilize mortars. New technologies such as mortar ballistic computers and communication equipment and are being integrated. Modern era combat is becoming more reliant on direct fire support from mortar carrier machine guns.

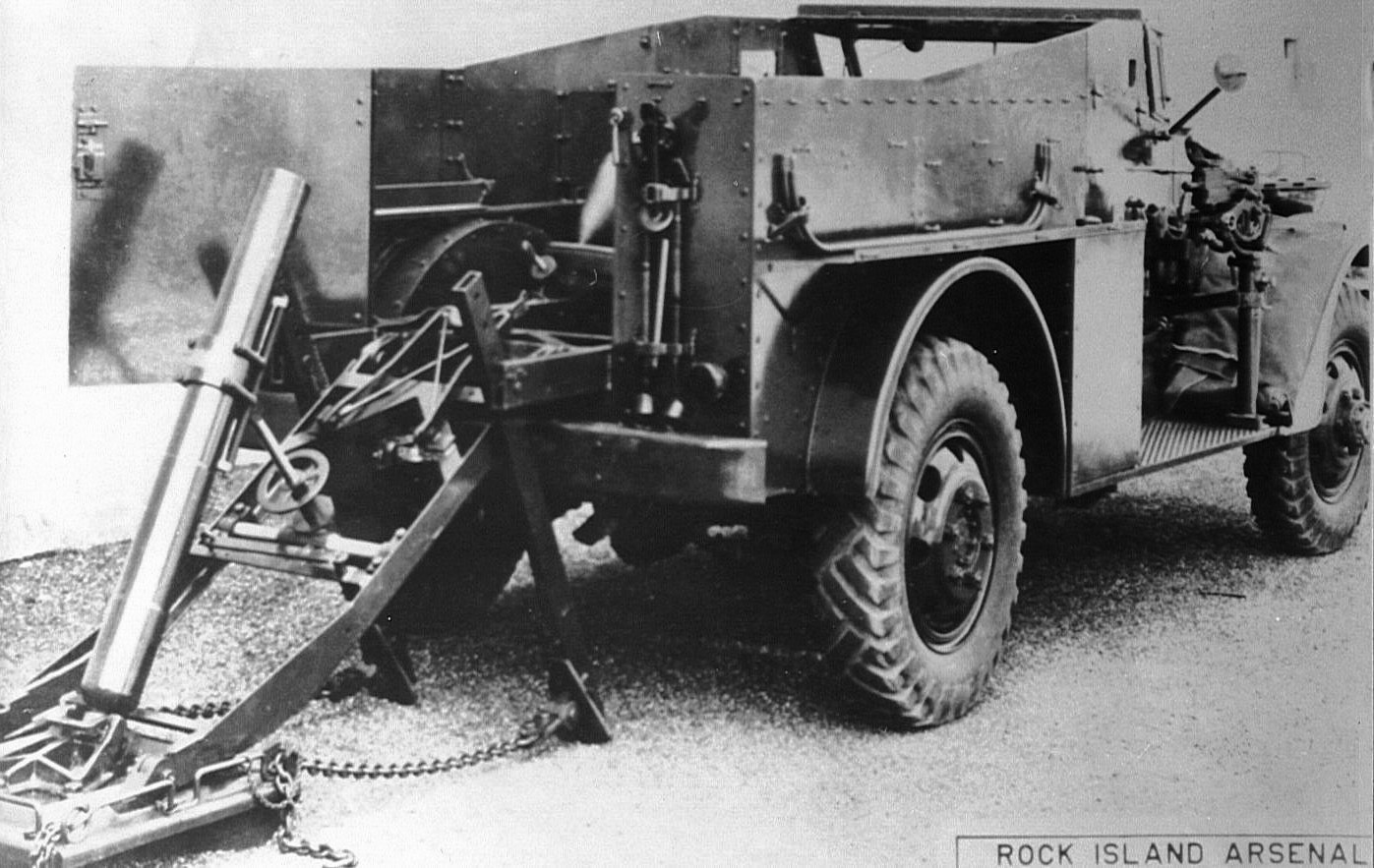
T5E1 4.2inch mortar carrier variant of the M3 Scout Car

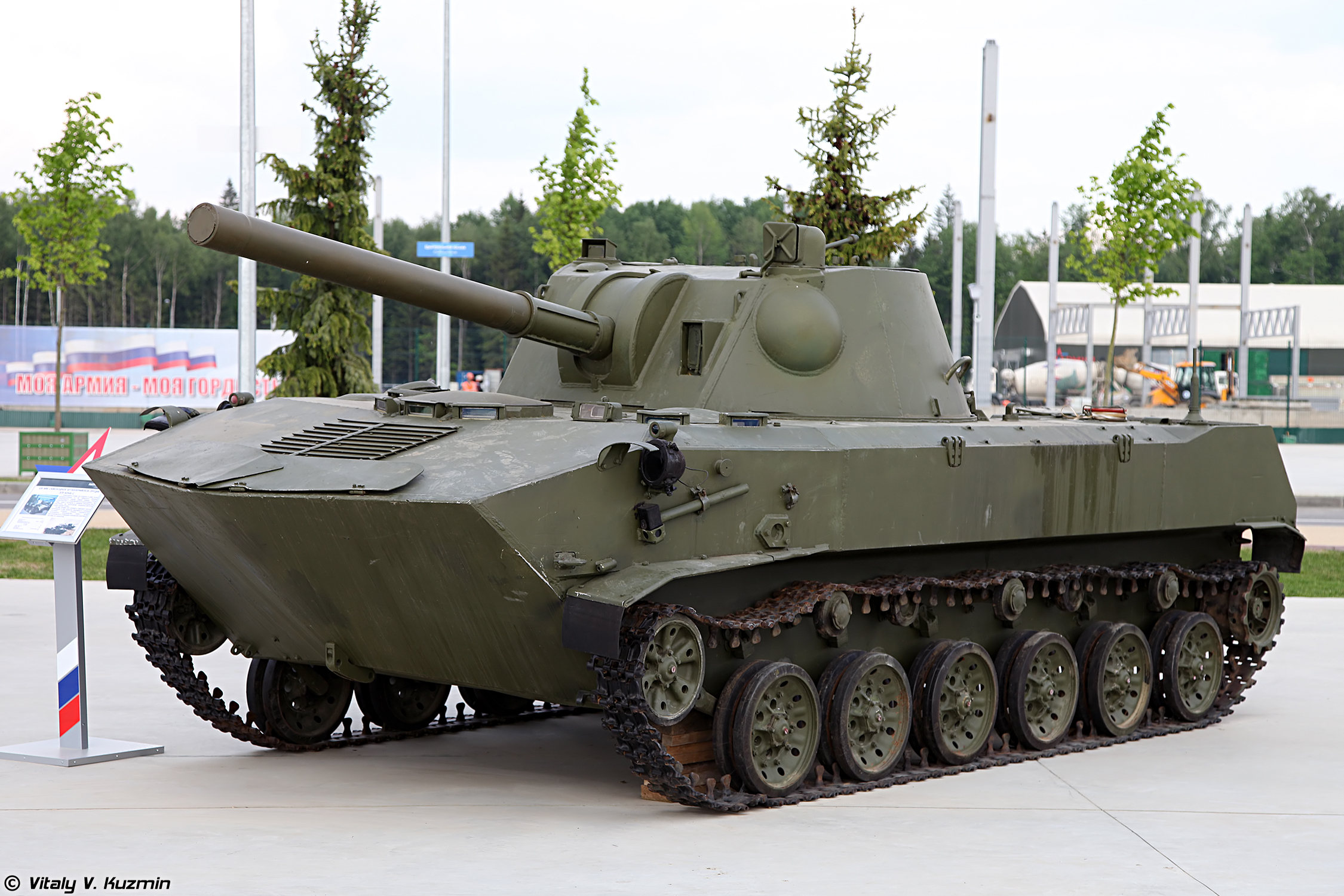
2S9 Nona-S 120 mm Soviet self-propelled mortar, 2016

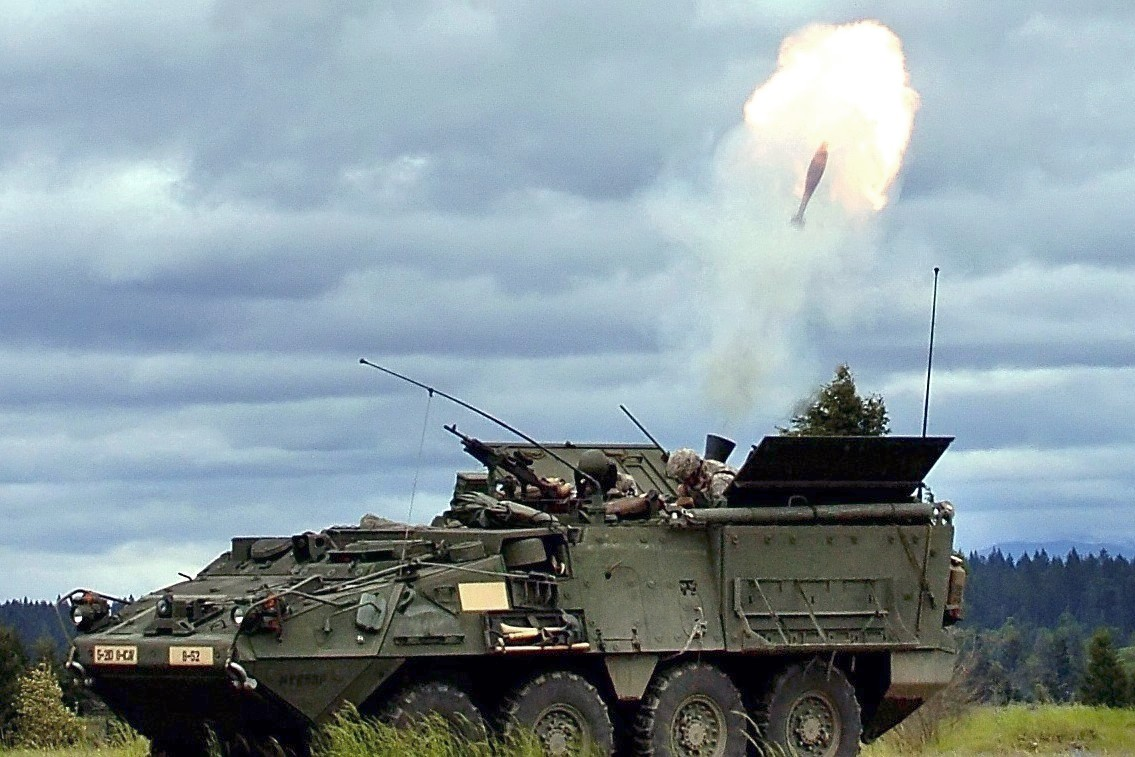
An American M1129 mortar carrier

==== Multiple rocket launcher ====
A multiple rocket launcher is a type of unguided rocket artillery system. Like other rocket artillery, multiple rocket launchers are less accurate and have a much lower (sustained) rate of fire than batteries of traditional artillery guns. However, they have the capability of simultaneously dropping many hundreds of kilograms of explosive, with devastating effect.

The Korean Hwacha is an example of an early weapon system with a resemblance to the modern-day multiple rocket launcher. The first self-propelled multiple rocket launchers – and arguably the most famous – were the Soviet BM-13 Katyushas, first used during World War II and exported to Soviet allies afterwards. They were simple systems in which a rack of launch rails was mounted on the back of a truck. This set the template for modern multiple rocket launchers. The first modern multiple rocket launcher was the German 15 cm Nebelwerfer 41 of the 1930s, a small towed artillery piece. Only later in World War II did the British deploy similar weapons in the form of the Land Mattress.The Americans mounted tubular launchers atop M4 Sherman tanks to create the T34 Calliope rocket launching tank, only used in small numbers, as their closest equivalent to the Katyusha.

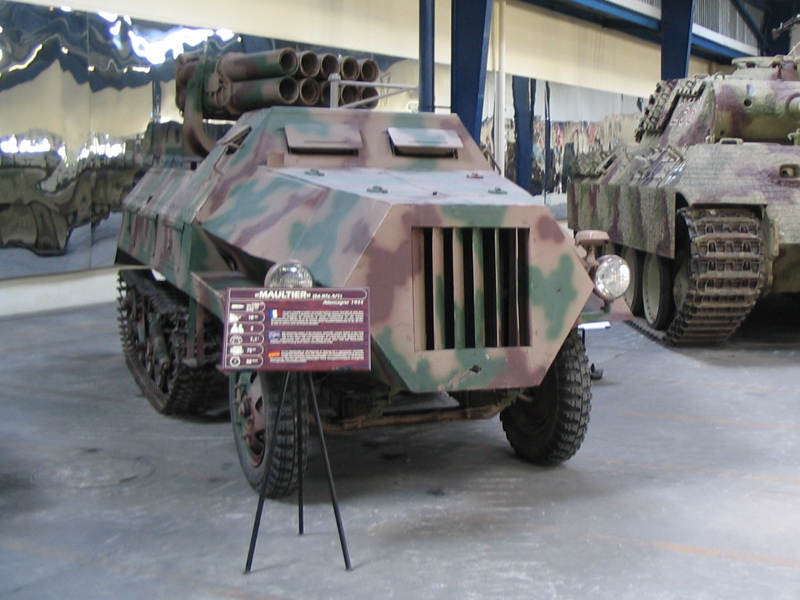
German Panzerwerfer half-tracked MRLS used in ww2

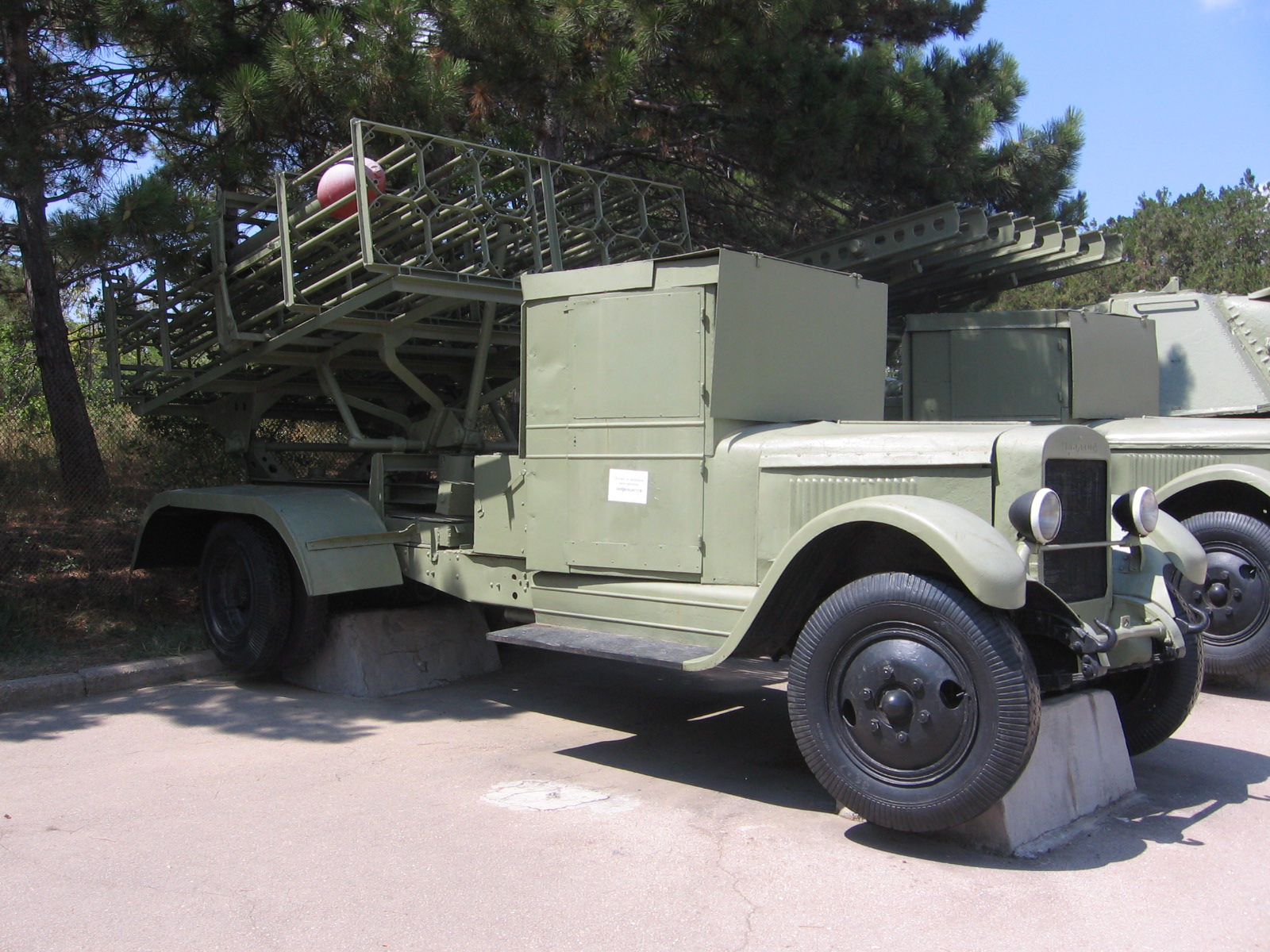
Katyusha rocket launcher at the Museum (Diorama) on Sapun Mountain, Sevastopol

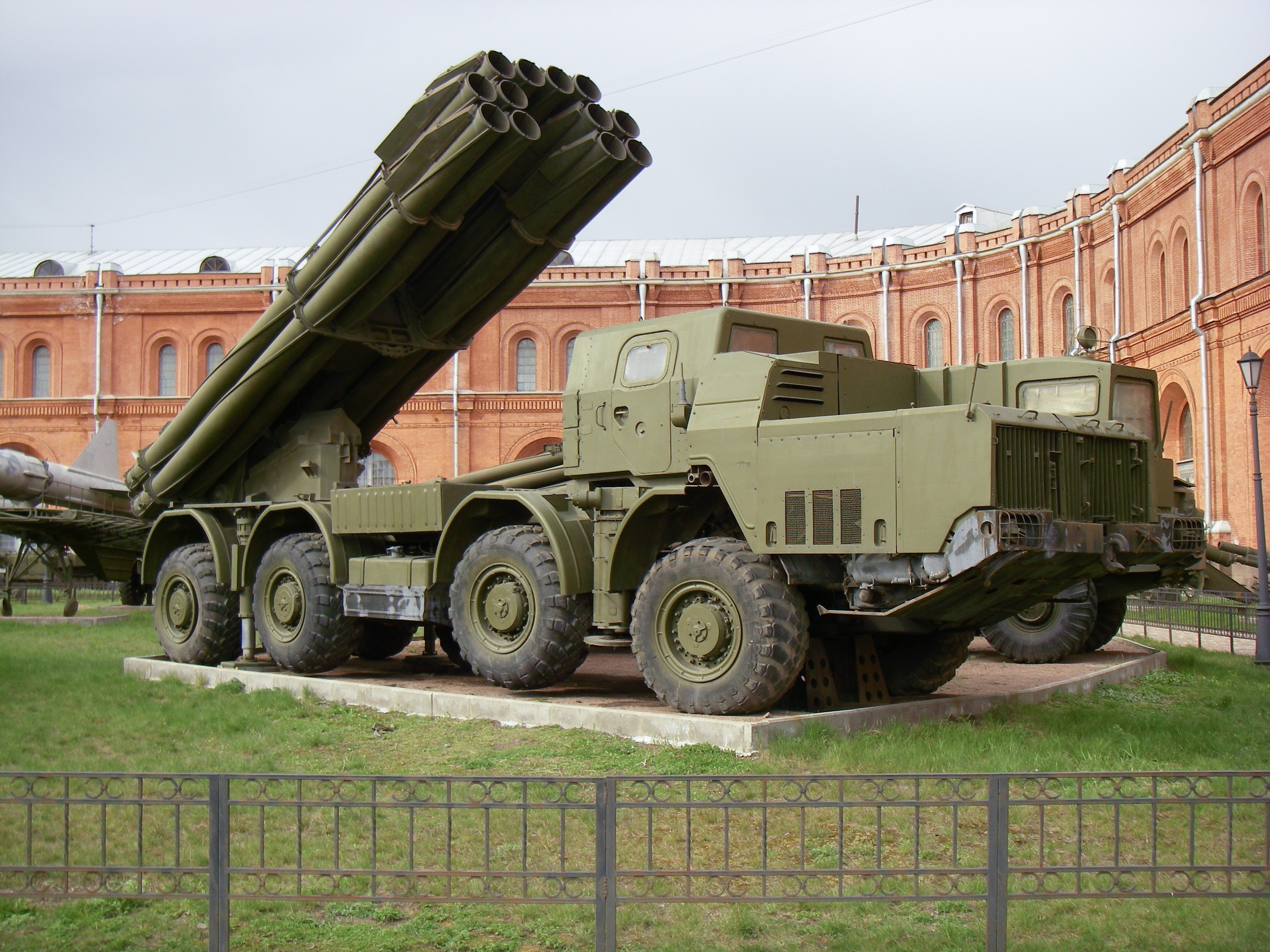
BM-30 Smerch 300 mm rocket launcher in raised position

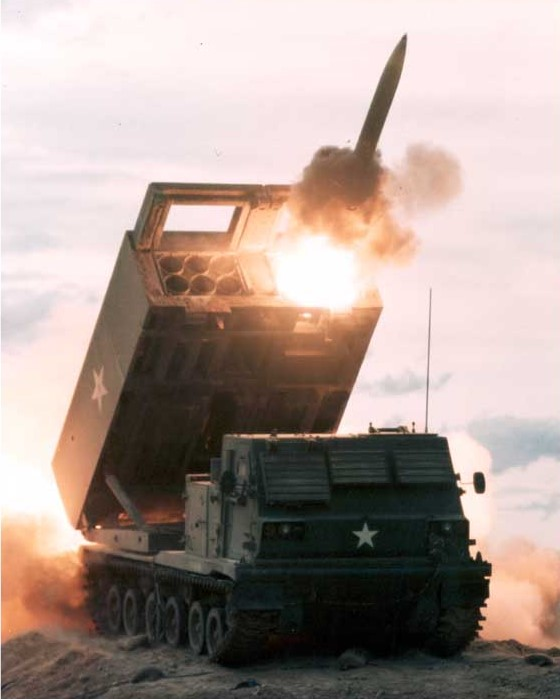
The M270 MLRS conducts a rocket launch.

==== Tank destroyer ====
Tank destroyers and tank hunters are armed with an anti-tank gun or anti-tank missile launcher, and are designed specifically to engage enemy armoured vehicles. Many have been based on a tracked tank chassis, while others are wheeled. Since World War II, main battle tanks have largely replaced gun-armed tank destroyers; although lightly armoured anti-tank guided missile (ATGM) carriers are commonly used for supplementary long-range anti-tank engagements.

In post-Cold War conflict, the resurgence of expeditionary warfare has seen the emergence of gun-armed wheeled vehicles, sometimes called "protected gun systems", which may bear a superficial resemblance to tank destroyers, but are employed as direct fire support units typically providing support in low intensity operations such as Iraq and Afghanistan. These have the advantage of easier deployment, as only the largest air transports can carry a main battle tank, and their smaller size makes them more effective in urban combat.

Many forces' IFVs carry anti-tank missiles in every infantry platoon, and attack helicopters have also added anti-tank capability to the modern battlefield. But there are still dedicated anti-tank vehicles with very heavy long-range missiles, or intended for airborne use. There have also been dedicated anti-tank vehicles built on ordinary armoured personnel carrier or armoured car chassis. Examples include the U.S. M901 ITV (Improved TOW Vehicle) and the Norwegian NM142, both on an M113 chassis, several Soviet ATGM launchers based on the BRDM scout car, the British FV438 Swingfire and FV102 Striker and the German Raketenjagdpanzer series built on the chassis of the HS 30 and Marder IFVs.

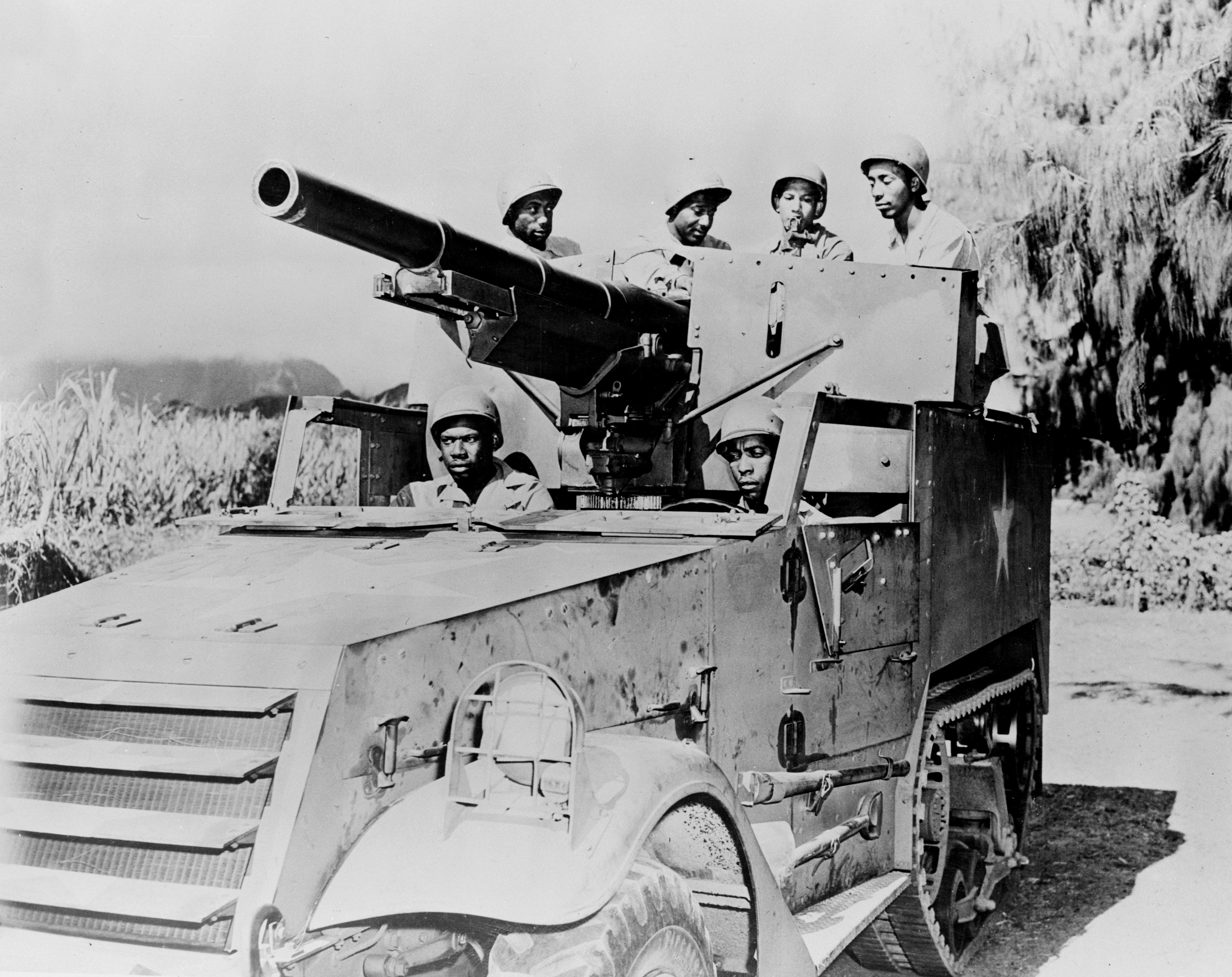
American M3 GMC half-tracked tank destroyer

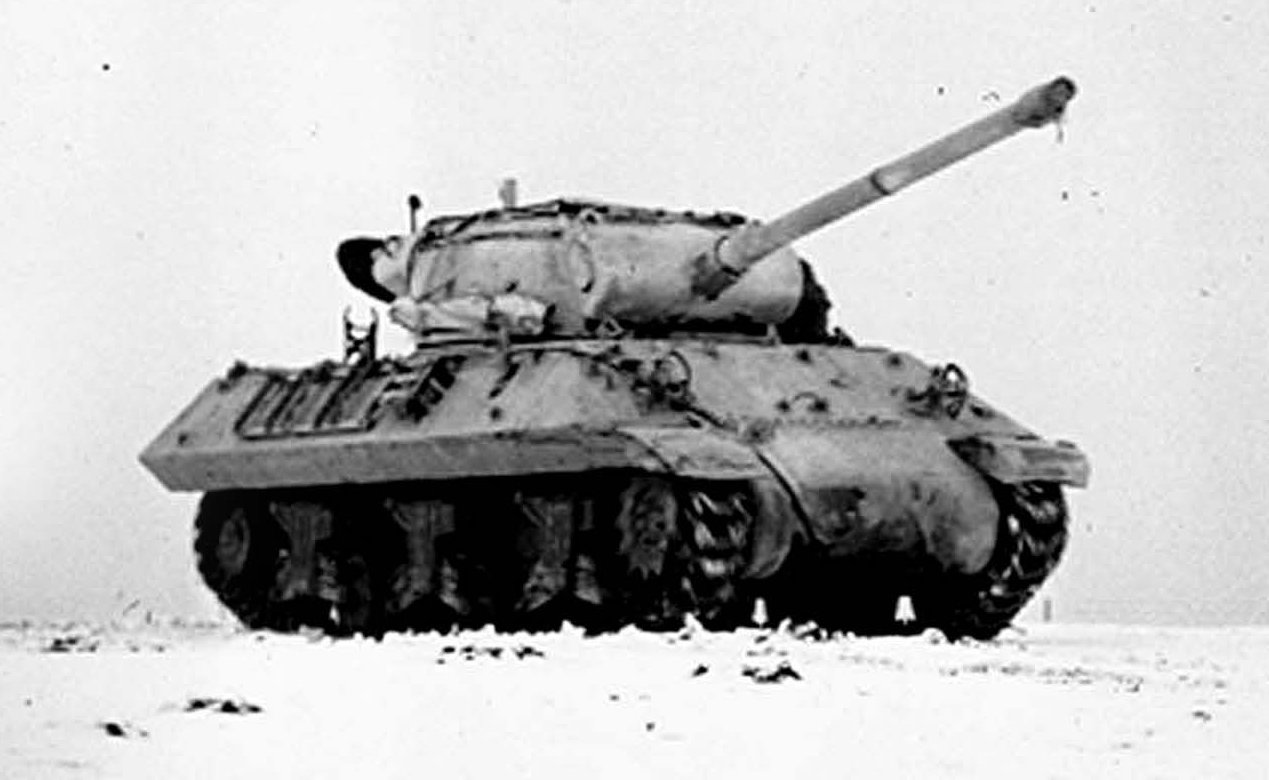
90mm m36 GMC during the Battle of the Bulge in January, 1945

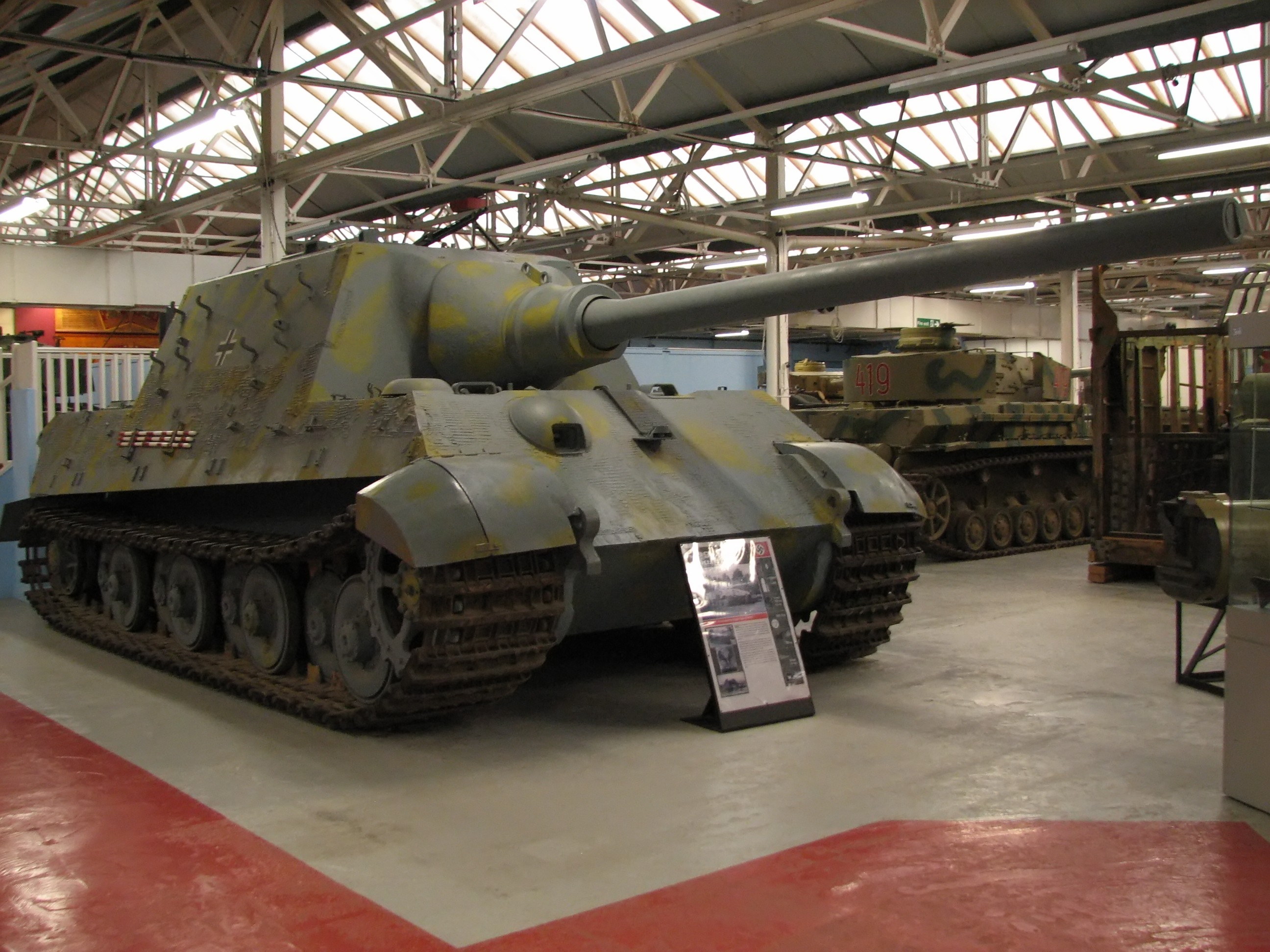
British-captured German Jagdtiger in The Tank Museum, the UK

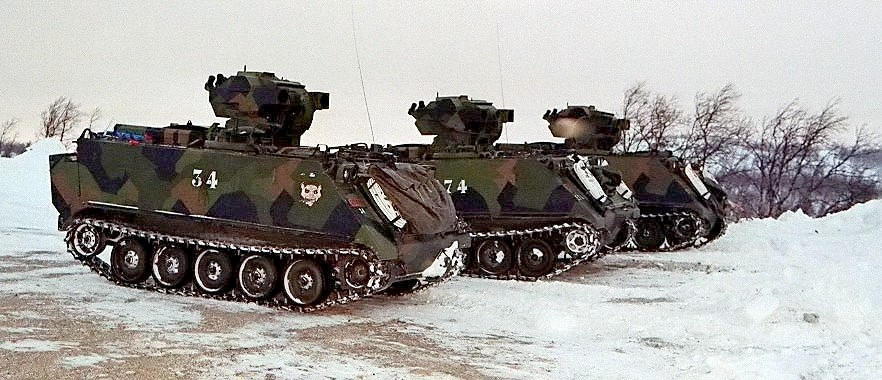
A Norwegian anti-tank platoon equipped with NM142 TOW missile launchers

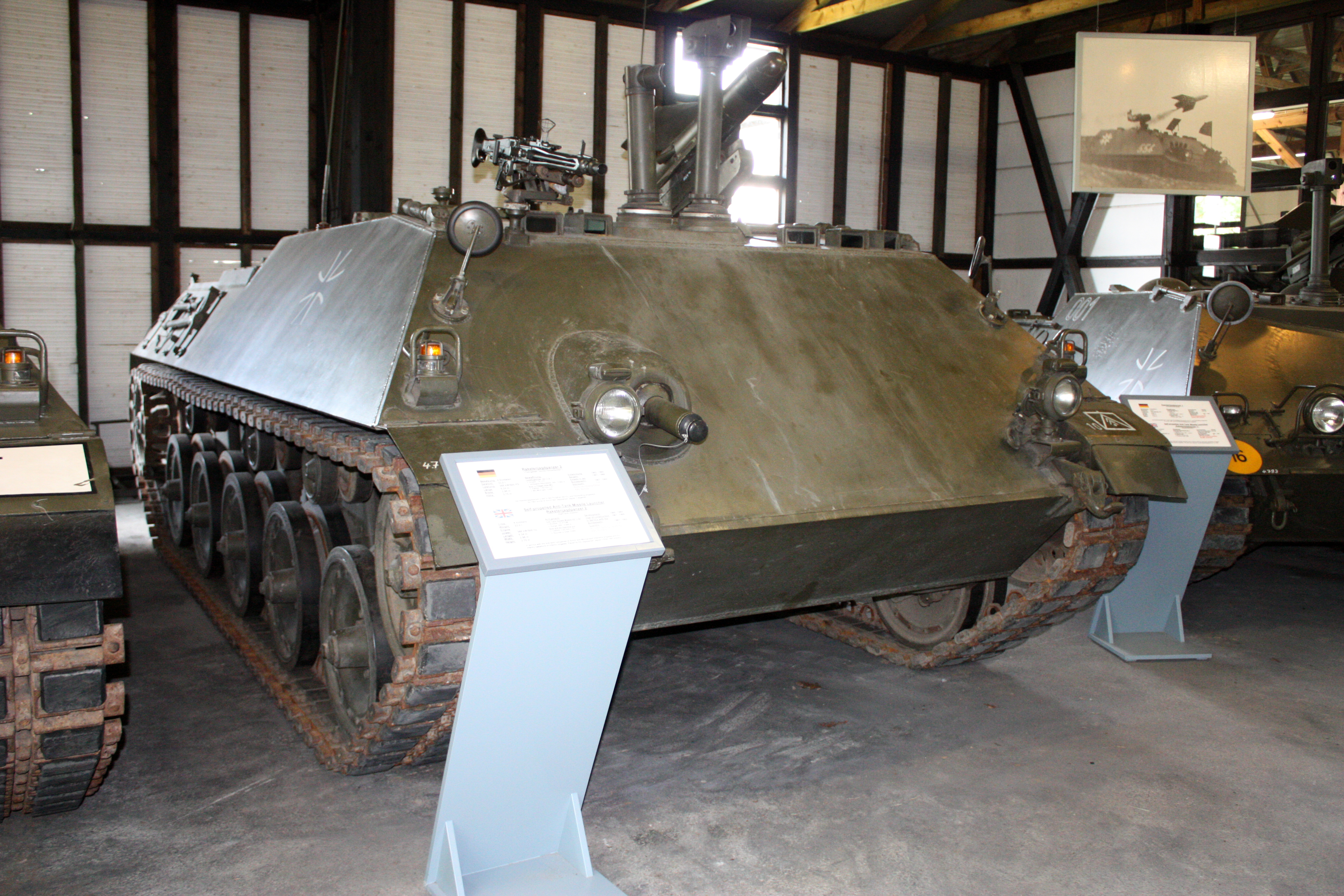
West German missile tank destroyer Raketenjagdpanzer 2

=== Armoured train ===
An armoured train is a railway train protected with armour. They are usually equipped with rail cars armed with artillery, autocannons, machine guns, tank turrets and anti-aircraft guns. They were mostly used during the late 19th to mid-20th century, when they offered an innovative way to quickly move large amounts of firepower. Their use was discontinued in most countries when road vehicles became much more powerful and offered more flexibility, and because armoured trains were too vulnerable to track sabotage and attacks from the air. However, the Russian Federation used improvised armoured trains in the Second Chechen War in the late 1990s and 2000s. Armoured trains carrying ballistic missiles have also been used.

The rail cars on an armoured train were designed for many tasks, such as carrying artillery and machine guns, infantry units, anti-tank and anti-aircraft guns. During World War II, the Germans would sometimes put a Fremdgerät (captured AFVs such as the French Somua S-35 or Czech PzKpfw 38(t)), or obsolescent Panzer II light tanks on a flatbed rail car, which could quickly be offloaded by means of a ramp and used away from the railway line to chase down enemy partisans.

Different types of armour were used to protect armoured trains from attack. In addition to various metal plates, concrete and sandbags were used in some cases on armoured trains.

Armoured trains were sometimes escorted by a kind of rail-tank called a draisine. One such example was the Italian 'Littorina' armoured trolley, which had a cab in the front and rear, each with a control set so it could be driven down the tracks in either direction. Littorina mounted two dual 7.92mm MG13 machine gun turrets from Panzer I light tanks.

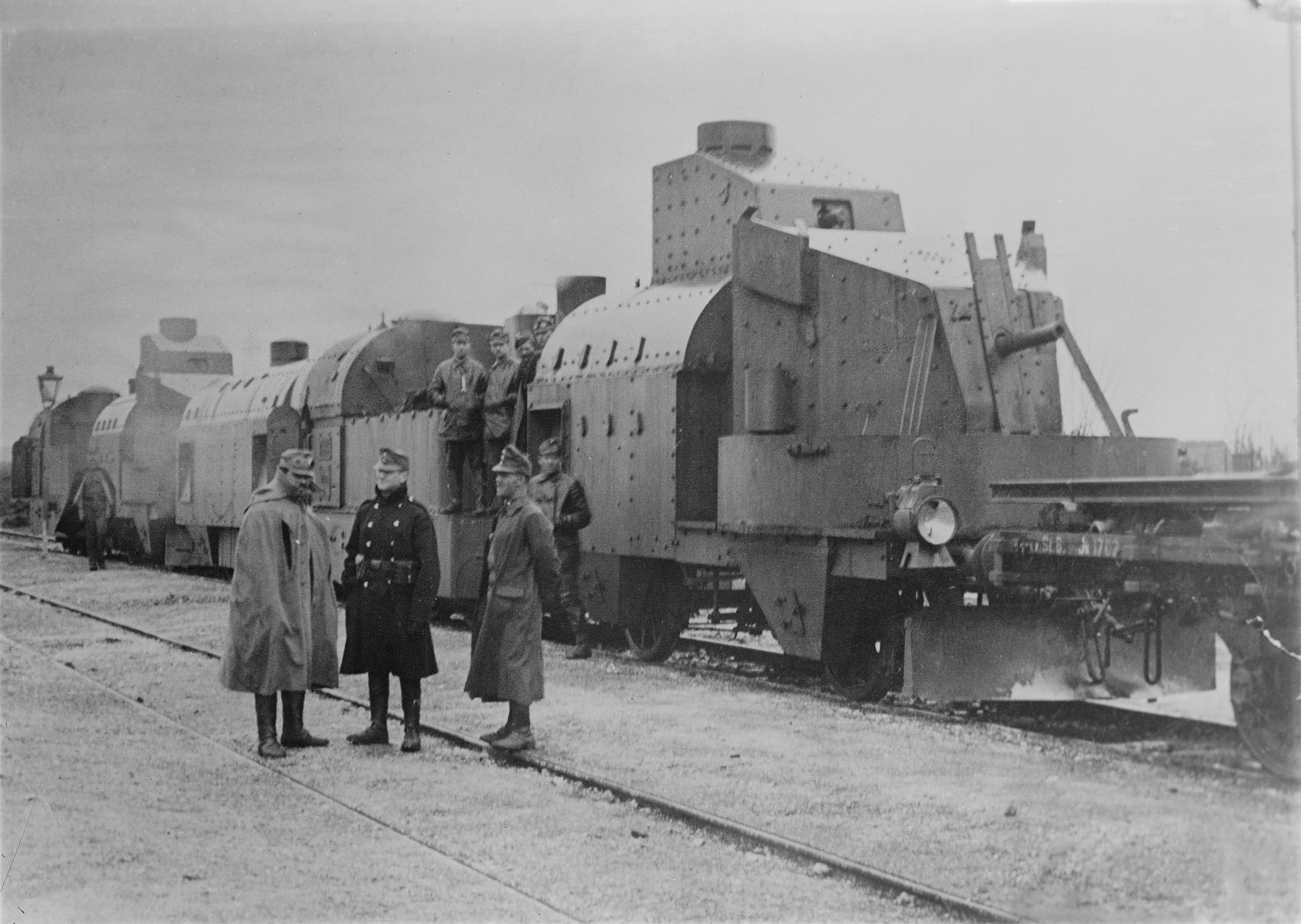
Hungarian MÁVAG armoured train in 1914

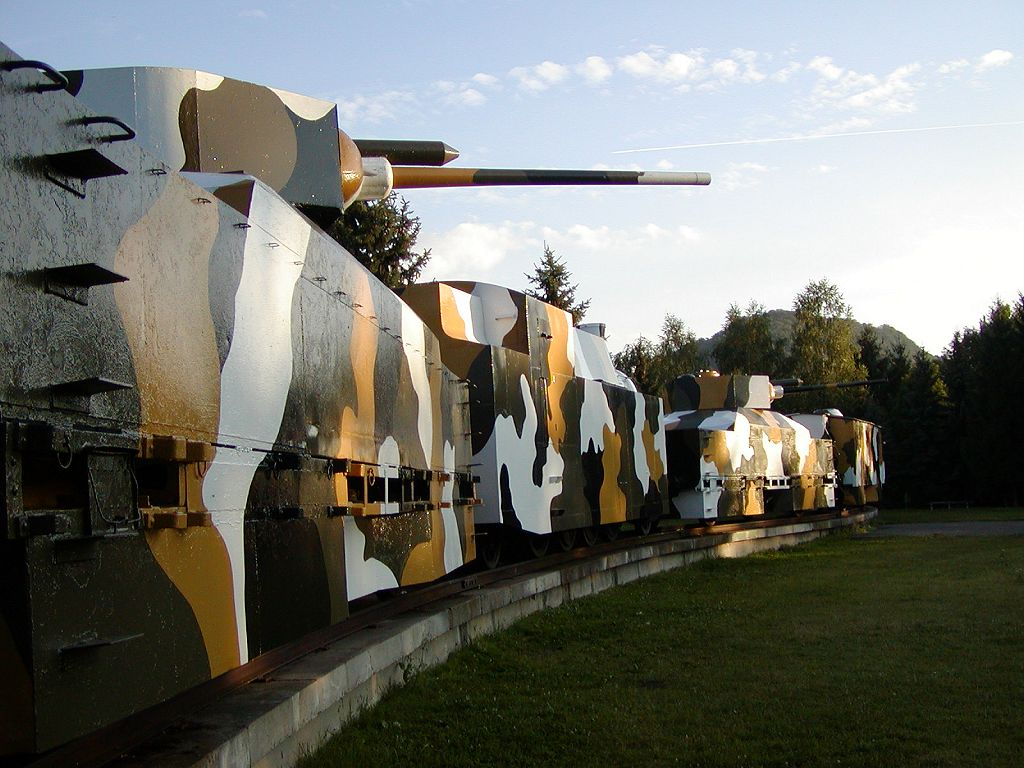
Replica of the "Hurban" armoured train located in Zvolen, Slovakia

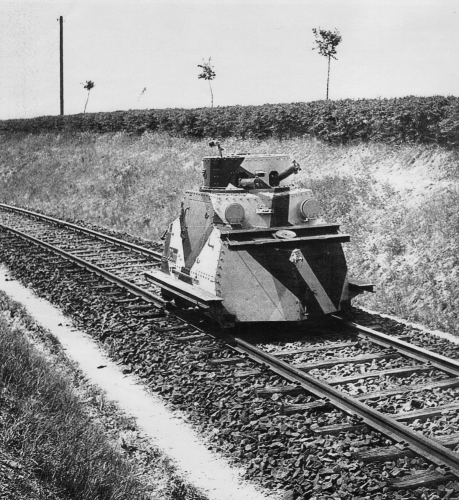
Polish armoured draisine Tatra T18

== See also ==
- Armoured warfare
- Lists of armoured fighting vehicles
- Non-military armoured vehicles
- Tachanka
- Tank classification
- Vehicle markings of the United States military
- Ansaldo MIAS
