= Armored car (military) =

Wheeled armoured fighting vehicle

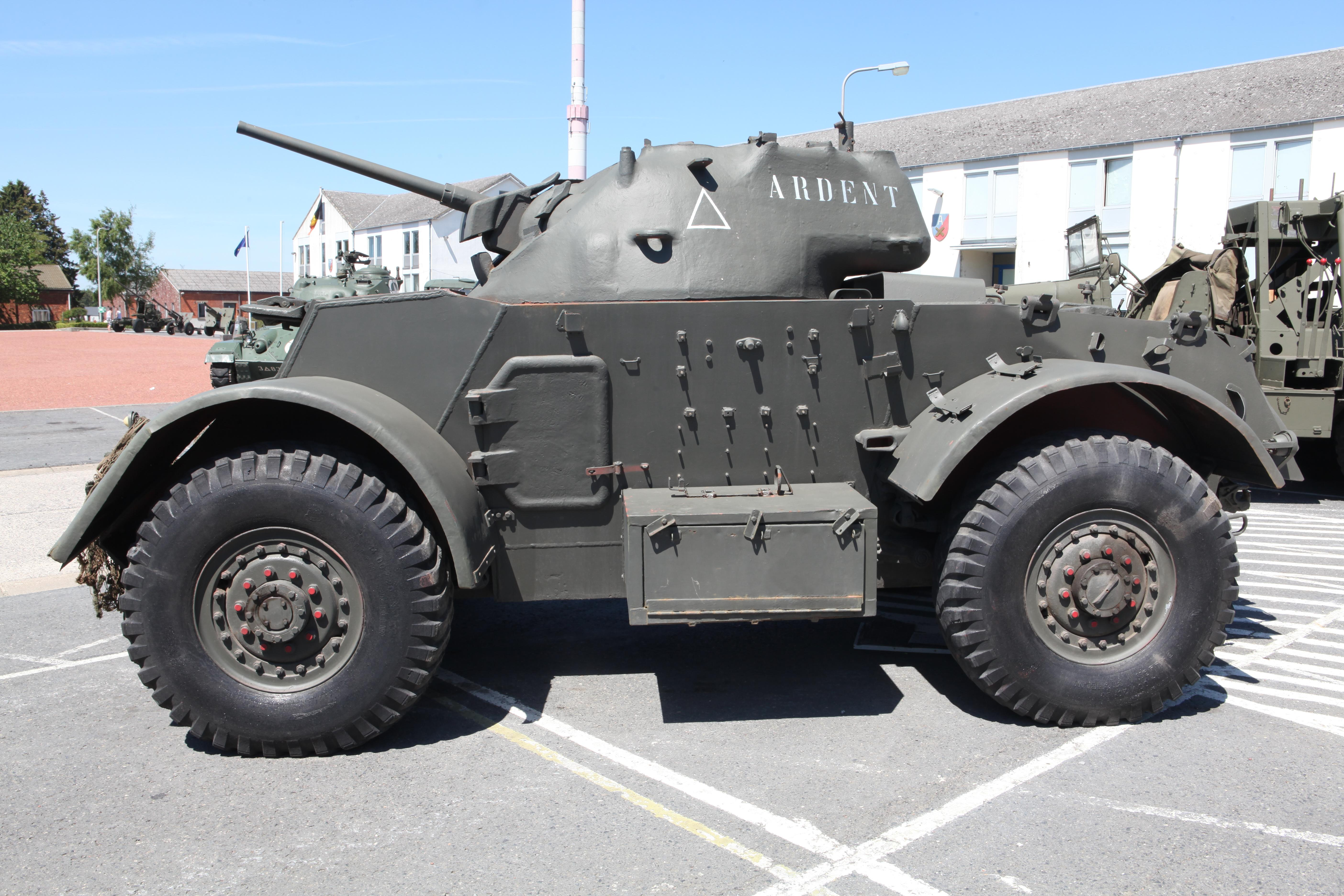
U.S. T17E1 Staghound armoured car of World War II

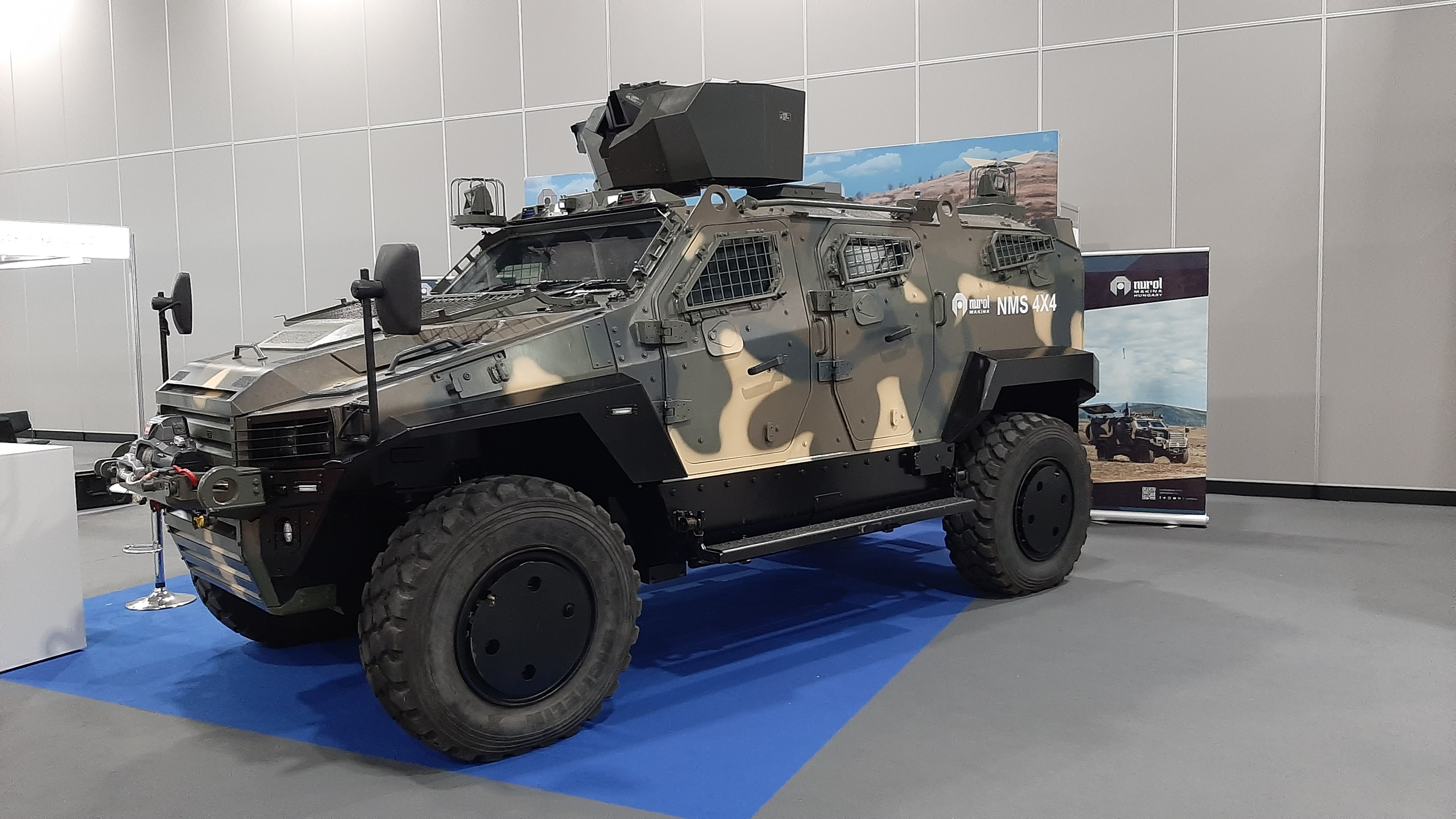
NMSS 4x4 Yörük, a modern armoured car of the Turkish Land Forces.

A military armored (also spelled armoured) car is a wheeled armoured fighting vehicle, historically employed for reconnaissance, internal security, armed escort, and other subordinate battlefield tasks. With the gradual decline of mounted cavalry, armored cars were developed for carrying out duties formerly assigned to light cavalry. Following the invention of the tank, the armoured car remained popular due to its faster speed, comparatively simple maintenance and low production cost. It also found favor with several colonial armies as a cheaper weapon for use in underdeveloped regions. During World War II, most armoured cars were engineered for reconnaissance and passive observation, while others were devoted to communications tasks. Some equipped with heavier armament could even substitute for tracked combat vehicles in favorable conditions—such as pursuit or flanking maneuvers during the North African campaign.

Since World War II the traditional functions of the armored car have been occasionally combined with that of the armoured personnel carrier, resulting in such multipurpose designs as the BTR-40 or the Cadillac Gage Commando. Postwar advances in recoil control technology have also made it possible for a few armoured cars, including the B1 Centauro, the Panhard AML, the AMX-10 RC and EE-9 Cascavel, to carry a large cannon capable of threatening many tanks.

== History ==
=== Precursors ===
During the Middle Ages, war wagons covered with steel plate, and crewed by men armed with primitive hand cannon, flails and muskets, were used by the Hussite rebels in Bohemia. These were deployed in formations where the horses and oxen were at the centre, and the surrounding wagons were chained together as protection from enemy cavalry. With the invention of the steam engine, Victorian inventors designed prototype self-propelled armored vehicles for use in sieges, although none were deployed in combat. H. G. Wells' short story "The Land Ironclads" provides a fictionalized account of their use.

=== Armed car ===
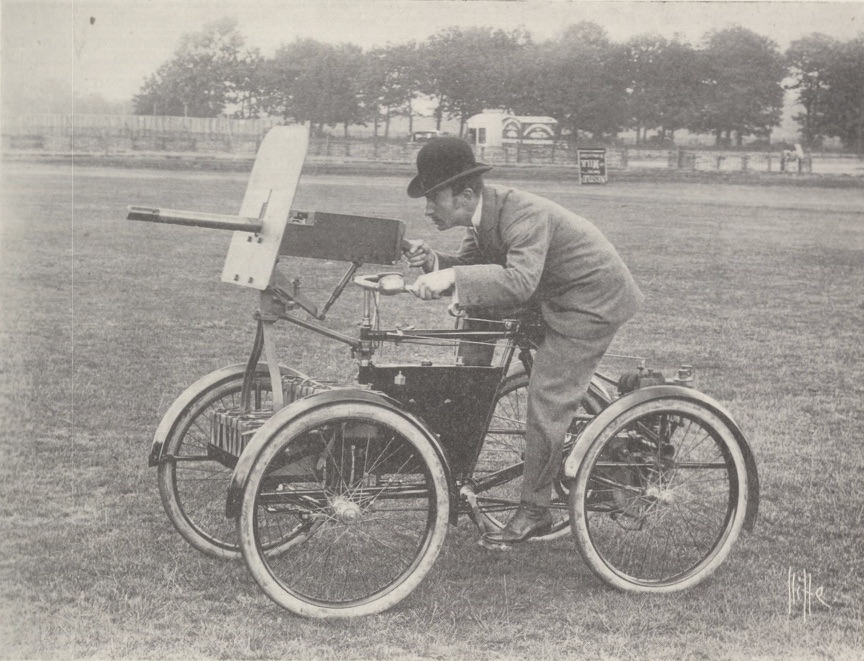
F.R. Simms' Motor Scout, built in 1898 as an armed car

The Motor Scout was designed and built by British inventor F.R. Simms in 1898. It was the first armed petrol engine-powered vehicle ever built. The vehicle was a De Dion-Bouton quadricycle with a mounted Maxim machine gun on the front bar. An iron shield in front of the car protected the driver.

Another early armed car was invented by Royal Page Davidson at Northwestern Military and Naval Academy in 1898 with the Davidson-Duryea gun carriage and the later Davidson Automobile Battery armored car.

However, these were not "armored cars" as the term is understood today, as they provided little protection for their crews from enemy fire.

=== First armoured cars ===
At the beginning of the 20th century, the first military armored vehicles were manufactured by adding armor and weapons to existing vehicles.

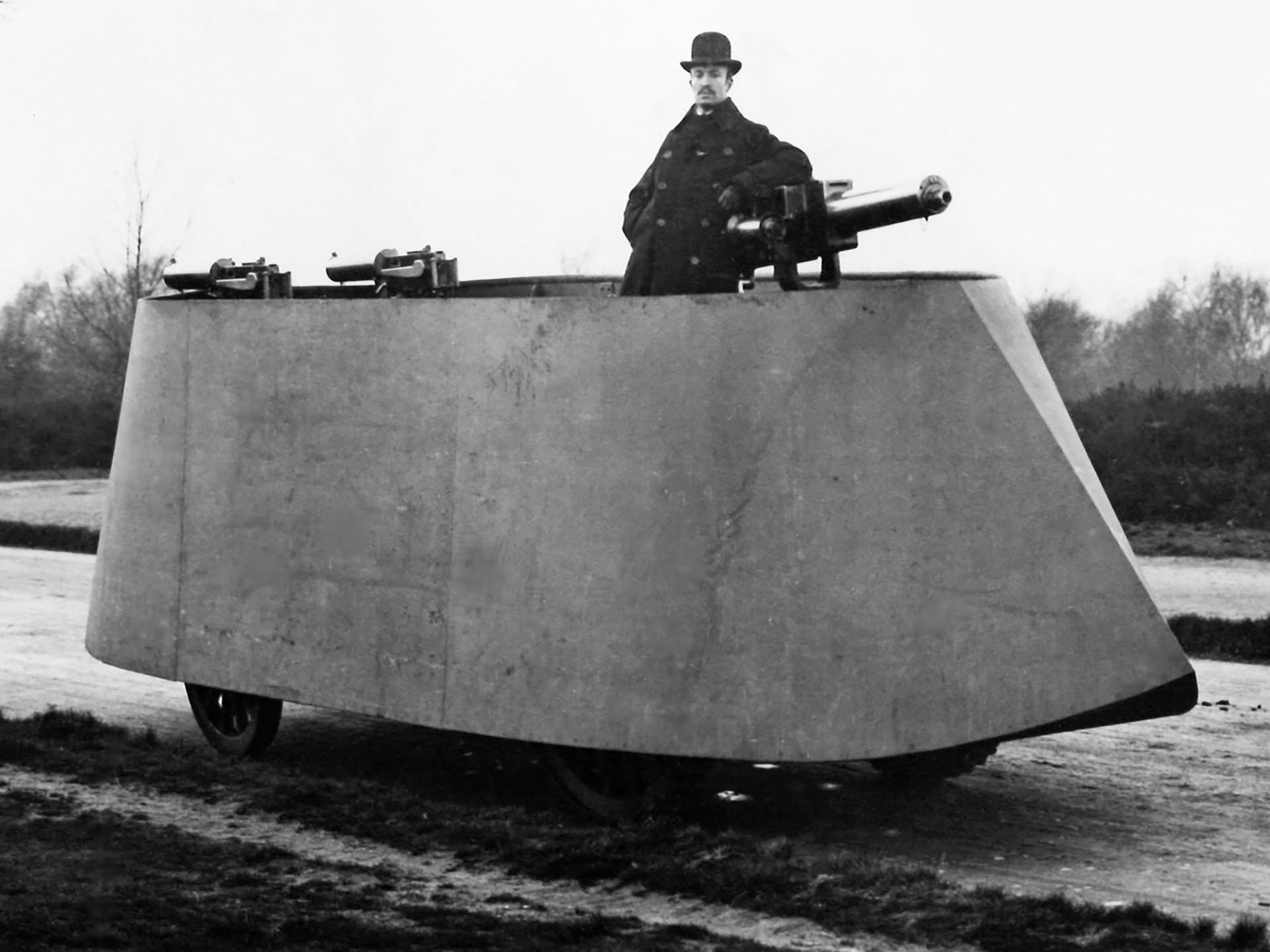
F.R. Simms' 1902 Motor War Car, the first armored car to be built

The first armored car was the Simms' Motor War Car, designed by F.R. Simms and built by Vickers, Sons & Maxim of Barrow on a special Coventry-built Daimler chassis with a German-built Daimler motor in 1899. and a single prototype was ordered in April 1899 The prototype was finished in 1902, too late to be used during the Boer War.

The vehicle had Vickers armor, 6 mm (0.24 in) thick, and was powered by a four-cylinder 3.3 L (200 cu in) 16 hp (12 kW) Cannstatt Daimler engine, giving it a maximum speed of around 9 mph (14 km/h). The armament, consisting of two Maxim guns, was carried in two turrets with 360° traverse. It had a crew of four. Simms' Motor War Car was presented at the Crystal Palace, London, in April 1902.

Another early armored car of the period was the French Charron, Girardot et Voigt 1902, presented at the Salon de l'Automobile et du cycle in Brussels, on 8 March 1902. The vehicle was equipped with a Hotchkiss machine gun, and with 7 mm (0.28 in) armour for the gunner.

One of the first operational armored cars with four wheel (4x4) drive and partly enclosed rotating turret, was the Austro-Daimler Panzerautomobil built by Austro-Daimler in 1904. It was armored with 3–3.5 mm (0.12–0.14 in) thick curved plates over the body (drive space and engine) and had a 4 mm (0.16 in) thick dome-shaped rotating turret that housed one or two machine-guns. It had a four-cylinder 35 hp (26 kW) 4.4 L (270 cu in) engine giving it average cross country performance. Both the driver and co-driver had adjustable seats enabling them to raise them to see out of the roof of the drive compartment as needed.

In 1907 the Mexican Army formed a Military Motor Service using several Maxwell cars armed with machineguns and modified to carry large amounts of water. Those were meant to counter Yaqui raids in desert regions.

The Spanish Schneider-Brillié was the first armored vehicle to be used in combat, being first used in the Kert Campaign. The vehicle was equipped with two machineguns and built from a bus chassis.

Armored cars saw limited use in the Italo-Turkish War. In the spring of 1912, the Italian command ordered that Isotta-Fraschini and FIAT armored cars be sent to Libya for field trials. The Italian Automitragliatrice Corazzata Fiat Arsenale mod. 1912 was used in September 1912 in Libya.

An armored car known as the ''Death Special'' was built at the CFI plant in Pueblo and used by the Badlwin-Felts detective agency during the Colorado Coalfield War.

At least two Isotta-Fraschini armored cars were in use with the Federal Army in Mexico.

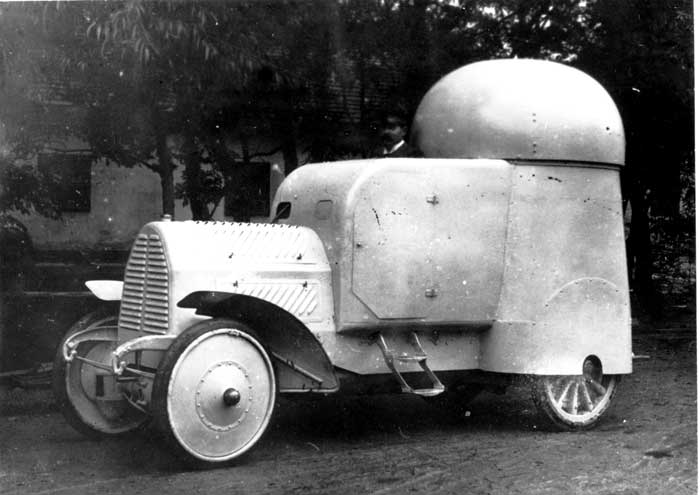
Austro-Daimler four-wheel-drive Armoured Car (1904)

=== World War I ===
A great variety of armored cars appeared on both sides during World War I and these were used in various ways. Generally, armored cars were used by more or less independent car commanders. However, sometimes they were used in larger units up to squadron size. The cars were primarily armed with light machine guns, but larger units usually employed a few cars with heavier guns. As air power became a factor, armored cars offered a mobile platform for antiaircraft guns.

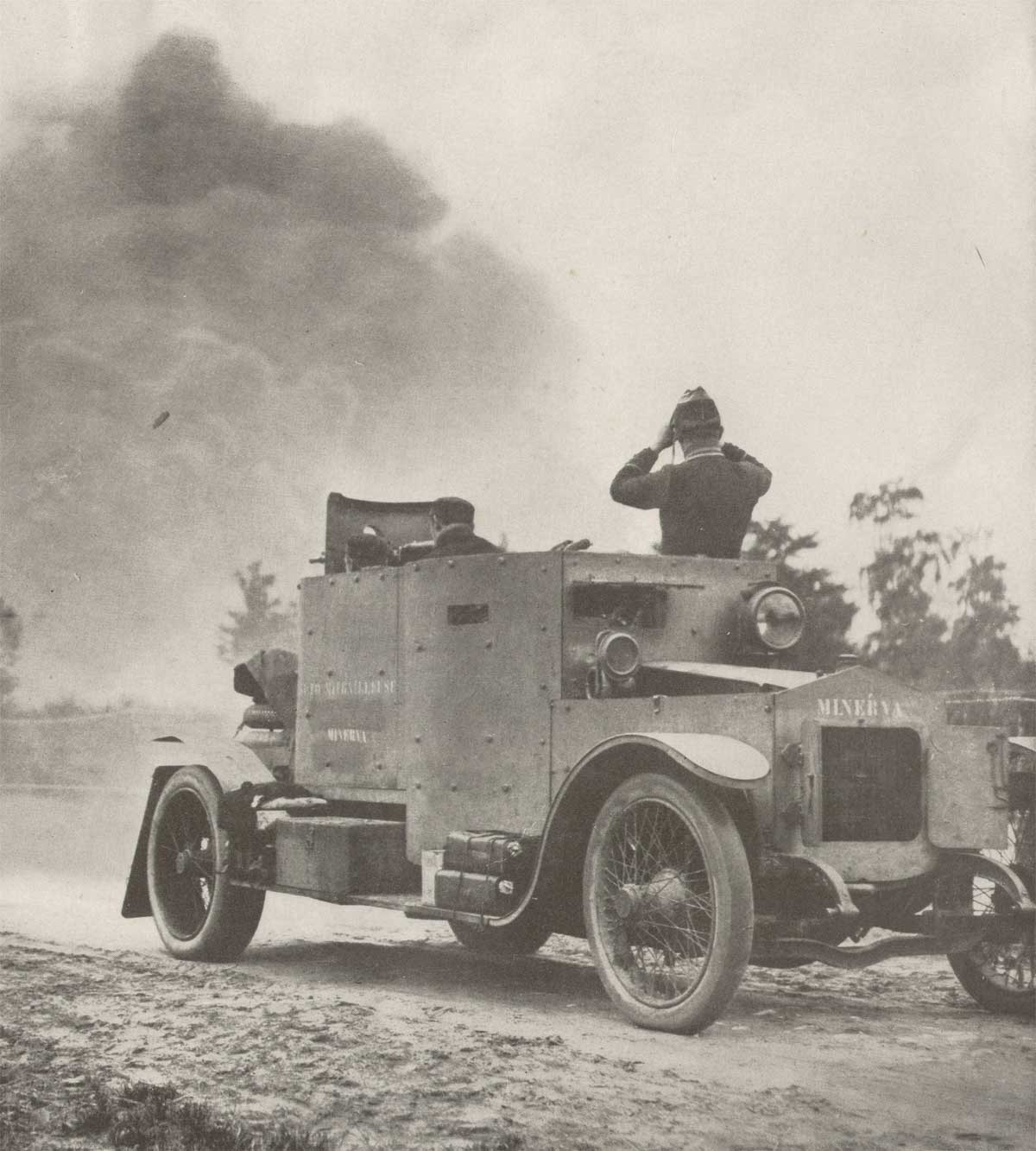
Belgium Minerva Armored car 1914

The first effective use of an armored vehicle in combat was achieved by the Belgian Army in August–September 1914. They had placed Cockerill armour plating and a Hotchkiss machine gun on Minerva touring cars, creating the Minerva Armored Car. Their successes in the early days of the war convinced the Belgian GHQ to create a Corps of Armoured Cars, who would be sent to fight on the Eastern front once the western front immobilized after the Battle of the Yser.

The British Royal Naval Air Service dispatched aircraft to Dunkirk to defend the UK from Zeppelins. The officers' cars followed them and these began to be used to rescue downed reconnaissance pilots in the battle areas. They mounted machine guns on them and as these excursions became increasingly dangerous, they improvised boiler plate armoring on the vehicles provided by a local shipbuilder. In London Murray Sueter ordered "fighting cars" based on Rolls-Royce, Talbot and Wolseley chassis. By the time Rolls-Royce armoured cars arrived in December 1914, the mobile period on the Western Front was already over.

More tactically important was the development of formed units of armored cars, such as the Canadian Automobile Machine Gun Brigade, which was the first fully mechanized unit in the history. The brigade was established on September 2, 1914, in Ottawa, as Automobile Machine Gun Brigade No. 1 by Brigadier-General Raymond Brutinel. The brigade was originally equipped with eight Armoured Autocars mounting two machine guns. By 1918 Brutinel's force consisted of two motor machine gun brigades (each of five gun batteries containing eight weapons apiece). The brigade, and its armored cars, provided yeoman service in many battles, notably at Amiens. The RNAS section became the Royal Naval Armoured Car Division reaching a strength of 20 squadrons before disbanded in 1915. and the armoured cars passing to the army as part of the Machine Gun Corps. Only NO.1 Squadron was retained; it was sent to Russia. As the Western Front turned to trench warfare unsuitable to wheeled vehicles, the armoured cars were moved to other areas.

The 2nd Duke of Westminster took No. 2 Squadron of the RNAS to France in March 1915 in time to make a noted contribution to the Second Battle of Ypres, and thereafter the cars with their master were sent to the Middle East to play a part in the British campaign in Palestine and elsewhere The Duke led a motorised convoy including nine armoured cars across the Western Desert in North Africa to rescue the survivors of the sinking of the SS Tara which had been kidnapped and taken to Bir Hakiem.

In Africa, Rolls Royce armoured cars were active in German South West Africa and Lanchester Armoured Cars in British East Africa against German forces to the south.

Armored cars also saw action on the Eastern Front. From 18 February to 26 March 1915, the German army under General Max von Gallwitz attempted to break through the Russian lines in and around the town of Przasnysz, Poland, (about 110 km / 68 miles north of Warsaw) during the Battle of Przasnysz (Polish: Bitwa przasnyska). Near the end of the battle, the Russians used four Russo-Balt armored cars and a Mannesmann-MULAG armored car to break through the Germans' lines and force the Germans to retreat.

=== World War II ===
The British Royal Air Force (RAF) in the Middle East was equipped with Rolls-Royce Armoured Cars and Morris tenders. Some of these vehicles were among the last of a consignment of ex-Royal Navy armored cars that had been serving in the Middle East since 1915. In September 1940 a section of the No. 2 Squadron RAF Regiment Company was detached to General Wavell's ground forces during the first offensive against the Italians in Egypt. During the actions in the October of that year the company was employed on convoy escort tasks, airfield defense, fighting reconnaissance patrols and screening operations.

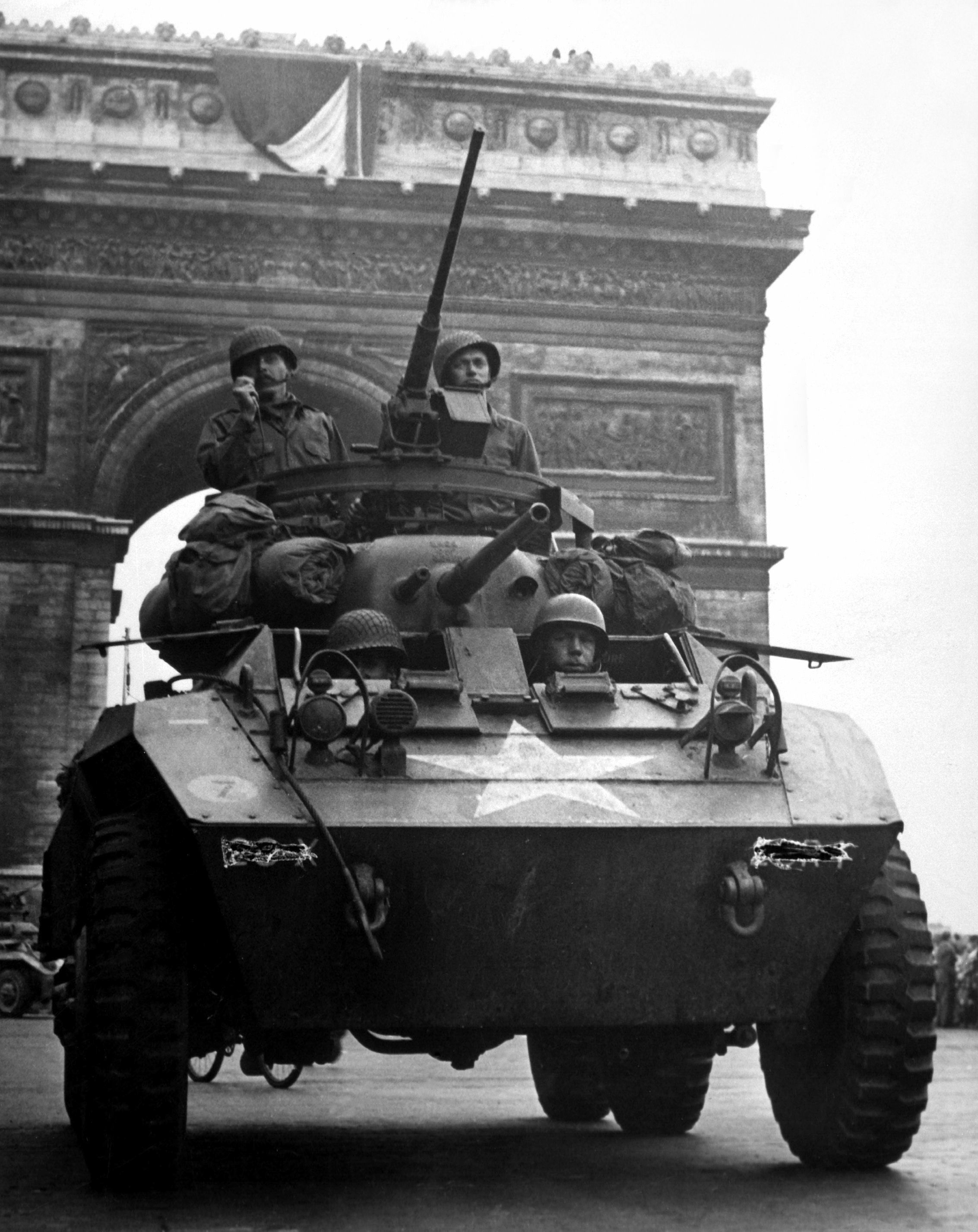
American troops in an M8 Greyhound passing the Arc de Triomphe after the liberation of Paris

During the 1941 Anglo-Iraqi War, some of the units located in the British Mandate of Palestine were sent to Iraq and drove Fordson armored cars. "Fordson" armored cars were Rolls-Royce armoured cars which received new chassis from a Fordson truck in Egypt.

By the start of the new war, the German army possessed some highly effective reconnaissance vehicles, such as the Schwerer Panzerspähwagen. The Soviet BA-64 was influenced by a captured Leichter Panzerspähwagen before it was first tested in January 1942.

In the second half of the war, the American M8 Greyhound and the British Daimler Armoured Cars featured turrets mounting light guns (40 mm or less). As with other wartime armored cars, their reconnaissance roles emphasized greater speed and stealth than a tracked vehicle could provide, so their limited armor, armament and off-road capabilities were seen as acceptable compromises.

== Military use ==
A military armored car is a type of armored fighting vehicle having wheels (from four to ten large, off-road wheels) instead of tracks, and usually light armor. Armored cars are typically less expensive and on roads have better speed and range than tracked military vehicles. They do however have less mobility as they have less off-road capabilities because of the higher ground pressure. They also have less obstacle climbing capabilities than tracked vehicles. Wheels are more vulnerable to enemy fire than tracks, they have a higher signature and in most cases less armor than comparable tracked vehicles. As a result, they are not intended for heavy fighting; their normal use is for reconnaissance, command, control, and communications, or for use against lightly armed insurgents or rioters. Only some are intended to enter close combat, often accompanying convoys to protect soft-skinned vehicle.

Light armored cars, such as the British Ferret are armed with just a machine gun. Heavier vehicles are armed with autocannon or a large caliber gun. The heaviest armored cars, such as the German, World War II era Sd.Kfz. 234 or the modern, US M1128 mobile gun system, mount the same guns that arm medium tanks.

Armored cars are popular for peacekeeping or internal security duties. Their appearance is less confrontational and threatening than tanks, and their size and maneuverability is said to be more compatible with tight urban spaces designed for wheeled vehicles. However, they do have a larger turning radius compared to tracked vehicles which can turn on the spot and their tires are vulnerable and are less capable in climbing and crushing obstacles. Furthermore, they are lightly armored and easily outgunned in direct combat.

Many modern forces now have their dedicated armored car designs, to exploit the advantages noted above. Examples would be the M1117 armored security vehicle of the USA or Alvis Saladin of the post-World War II era in the United Kingdom.

Alternatively, civilian vehicles may be modified into improvised armored cars in ad hoc fashion. Many militias and irregular forces adapt civilian vehicles into AFVs (armored fighting vehicles) and troop carriers, and in some regional conflicts these "technicals" are the only combat vehicles present. On occasion, even the soldiers of national militaries are forced to adapt their civilian-type vehicles for combat use, often using improvised armor and scrounged weapons.

=== Scout cars ===
In the 1930s, a new sub-class of armored car emerged in the United States, known as the scout car. This was a compact light armored car which was either unarmed or armed only with machine guns for self-defense. Scout cars were designed as purpose-built reconnaissance vehicles for passive observation and intelligence gathering. Armored cars which carried large caliber, turreted weapons systems were not considered scout cars. The concept gained popularity worldwide during World War II and was especially favored in nations where reconnaissance theory emphasized passive observation over combat.

Examples of armored cars also classified as scout cars include the Soviet BRDM series, the British Ferret, the Brazilian EE-3 Jararaca, the Hungarian D-442 FÚG, and the American Cadillac Gage Commando Scout.

== See also ==
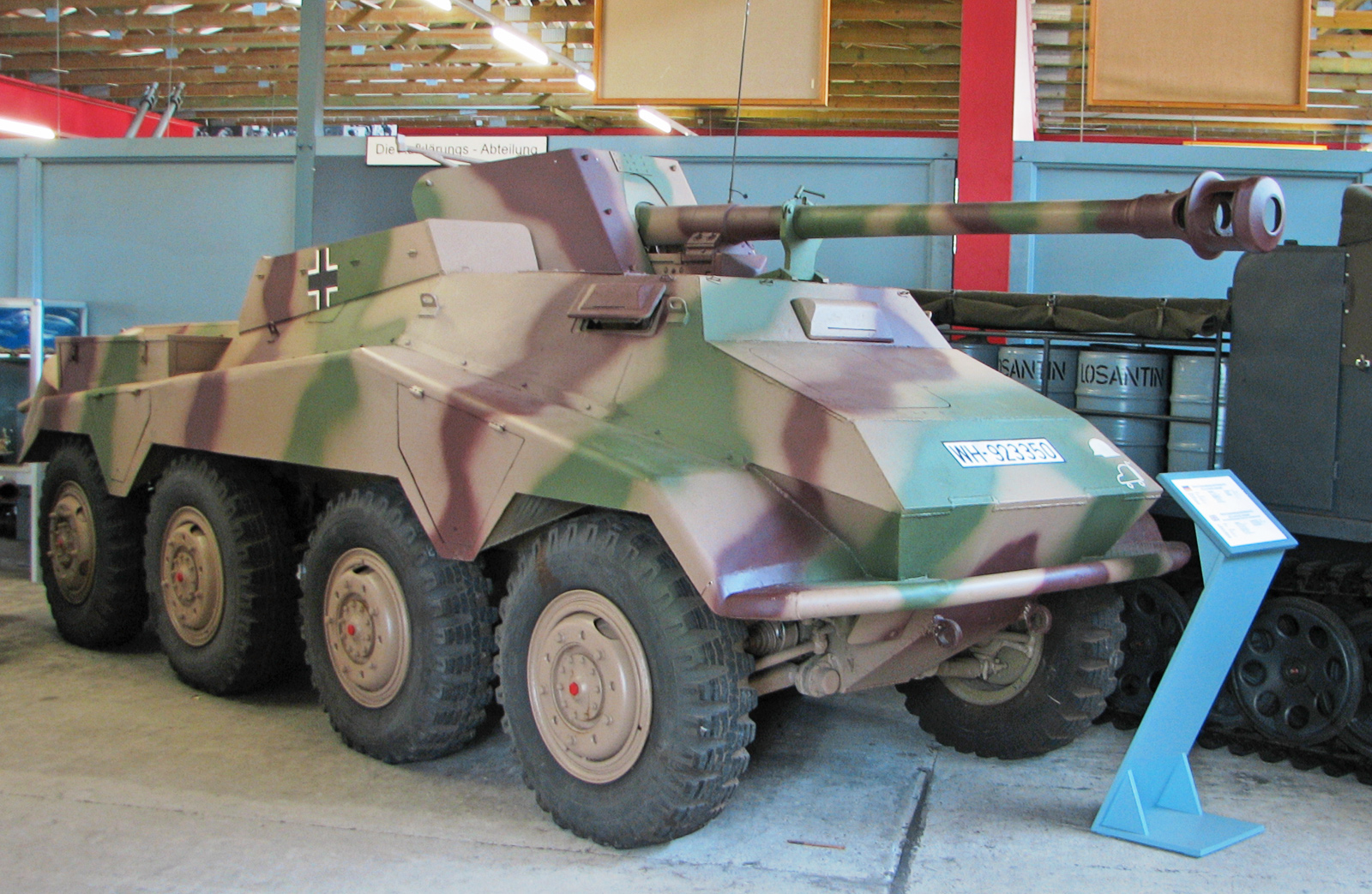
A preserved, World War II, German Sd.Kfz. 234/4 heavy armored car (German Tank Museum, 2006)

- Armored bus
- Armored personnel carrier
- Armored car (valuables)
- Armored car (VIP)
- Armoring:
  - Aramid
  - Bulletproof glass
  - Twaron
  - Vehicle armor
- Gun truck
- SWAT vehicle
- Tankette
- Technical (vehicle)
