= Minerva armoured car =

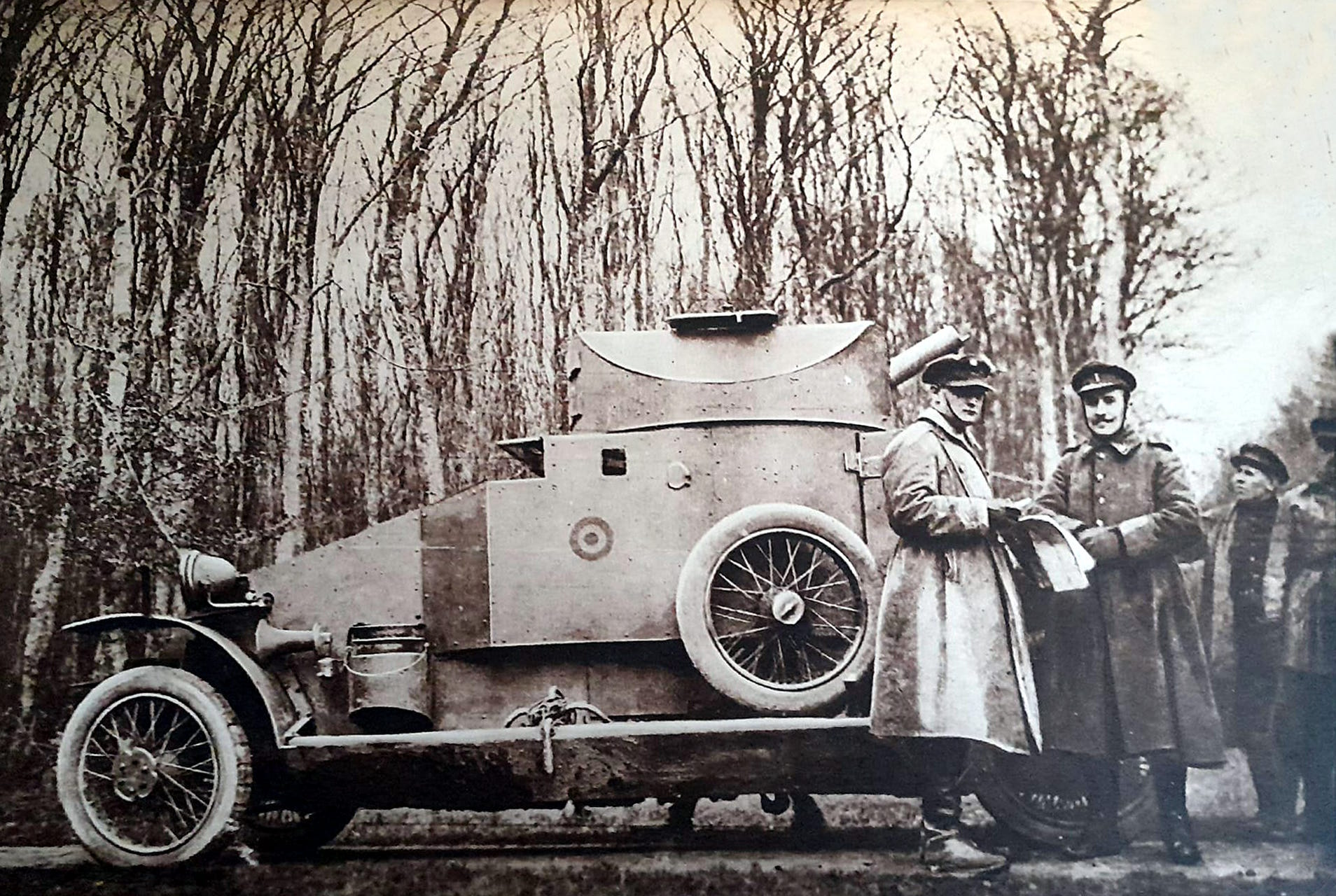
- Minerva armoured car, model 1913
- Type: Armoured car
- Place of origin: Belgium

Specifications
- Mass: 3 tonnes
- Length: 4.90 m
- Width: 1.75 m
- Height: 2.00 m
- Crew: 3–5
- Armor: up to 3 mm
- Main armament: 1 x Hotchkiss model 1909 machine-gun,1 x Maxim M1910 machine gun, or 1 x Puteaux S18 37 mm cannon
- Engine: 4-cyl gas. Minerva 8L; 40 bhp at 2500 rpm
- Suspension: 4x2 wheel
- Operational range: 150 km (90 mi)
- Maximum speed: 40 km/h (25 mph)

The Minerva armoured car (Dutch: Minerva pantserwagen, French: Automitrailleuse Minerva) was a military armoured car expediently developed by Minerva civilian automobiles in Belgium at the start of the First World War.

== Background ==
At the beginning of the twentieth century, the first military armoured vehicles were manufactured by adding armour and weapons to existing vehicles. The first armoured car was the Simms' Motor War Car, designed by F.R. Simms in response to the Second Boer War and built by Vickers, Sons & Maxim in Britain

Another early armoured car of the period was the French Charron, Girardot et Voigt 1902, presented at the Salon de l'Automobile et du cycle in Brussels, on 8 March 1902. The vehicle was equipped with a Hotchkiss machine gun, and with 7 mm armour for the gunner although it, too, was only a prototype and never used in warfare.

== History ==
The Minerva's use in combat in August 1914 made Belgium the first Nation to employ armoured cars in World War I, though Italy had previously been the first to use armoured cars in a theatre of conflict, in the 1911–1912 Italo-Turkish War. Also the armoured Canadian Automobile Machine Gun Brigade was formed on August 24, 1914, and close to being assembled by that September.

During the war those that could afford to rode into battle on their own horses, much like this (in 1914) Lieutenant Charles Henkart arranged for two of his civilian Minerva Motor Works tourers to be armoured at the Cockerill Works in Hoboken. The initial armoured cars were ad hoc but soon Minerva had created a standard design. American papers were reporting the use of the armoured car by September 1914. The crew was partially exposed to gunfire with the open top. This would prove fatal to Lieutenant Henkart when on September 6, 1914, he was killed by gunfire after the armoured car he was in was caught in a German ambush. Before the Minerva factory was captured during the German invasion and occupation of Belgium about thirty Minerva armored cars were built. In 1916 the design of the original armoured car was completely revised. The open top was now fully enclosed and the machine gun under an armoured cupola. The Belgian Army used the cars as motorised cavalry units with three-car platoons. The armoured car units were mostly used for reconnaissance, infantry fire support and missions behind enemy lines. After the Western Front became bogged down in trench warfare some of the cars were sent to the Eastern Front with the Belgian Expeditionary Corps in Russia.

== Gallery ==
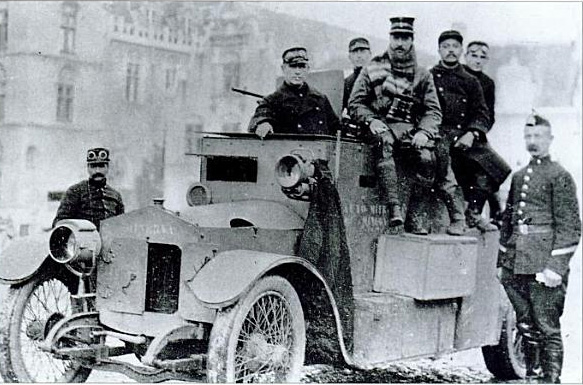
1914

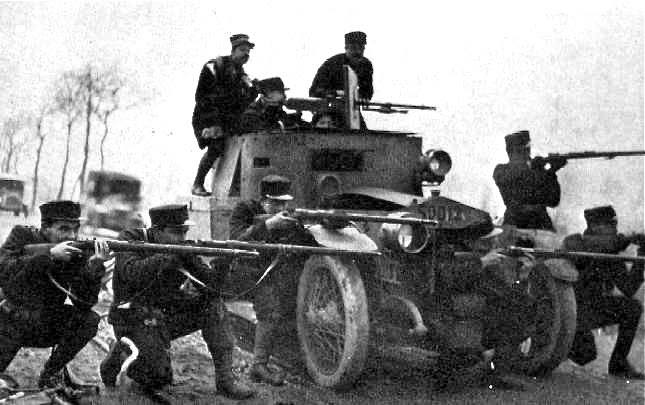
In action at a roadblock in 1914

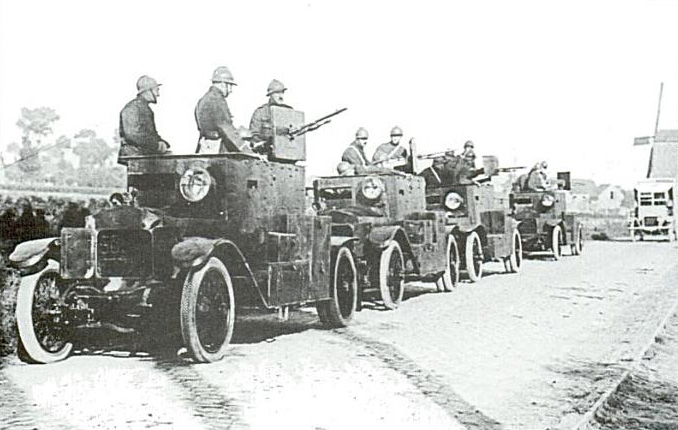
Combat Group – Minerva model 1914

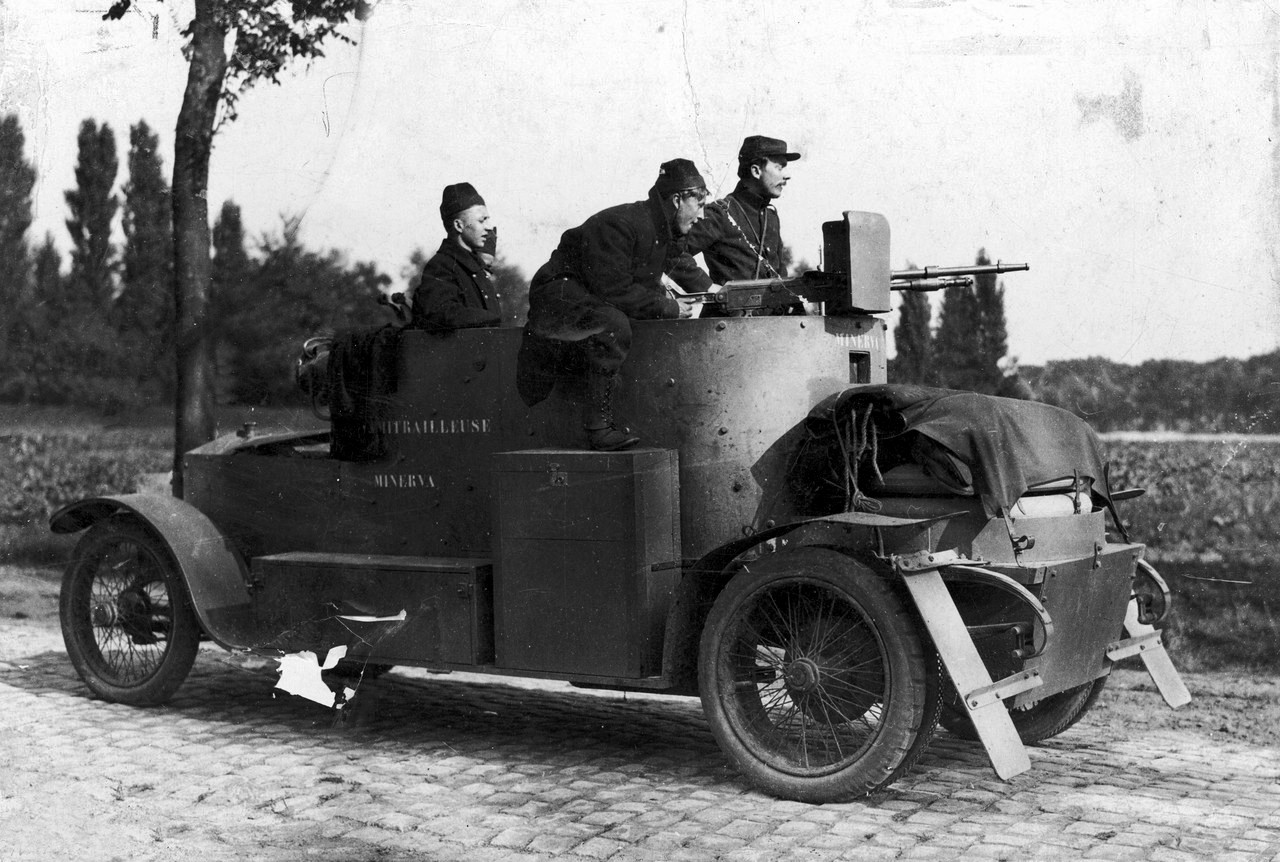
Crew of a Belgian Minerva armoured car 1914

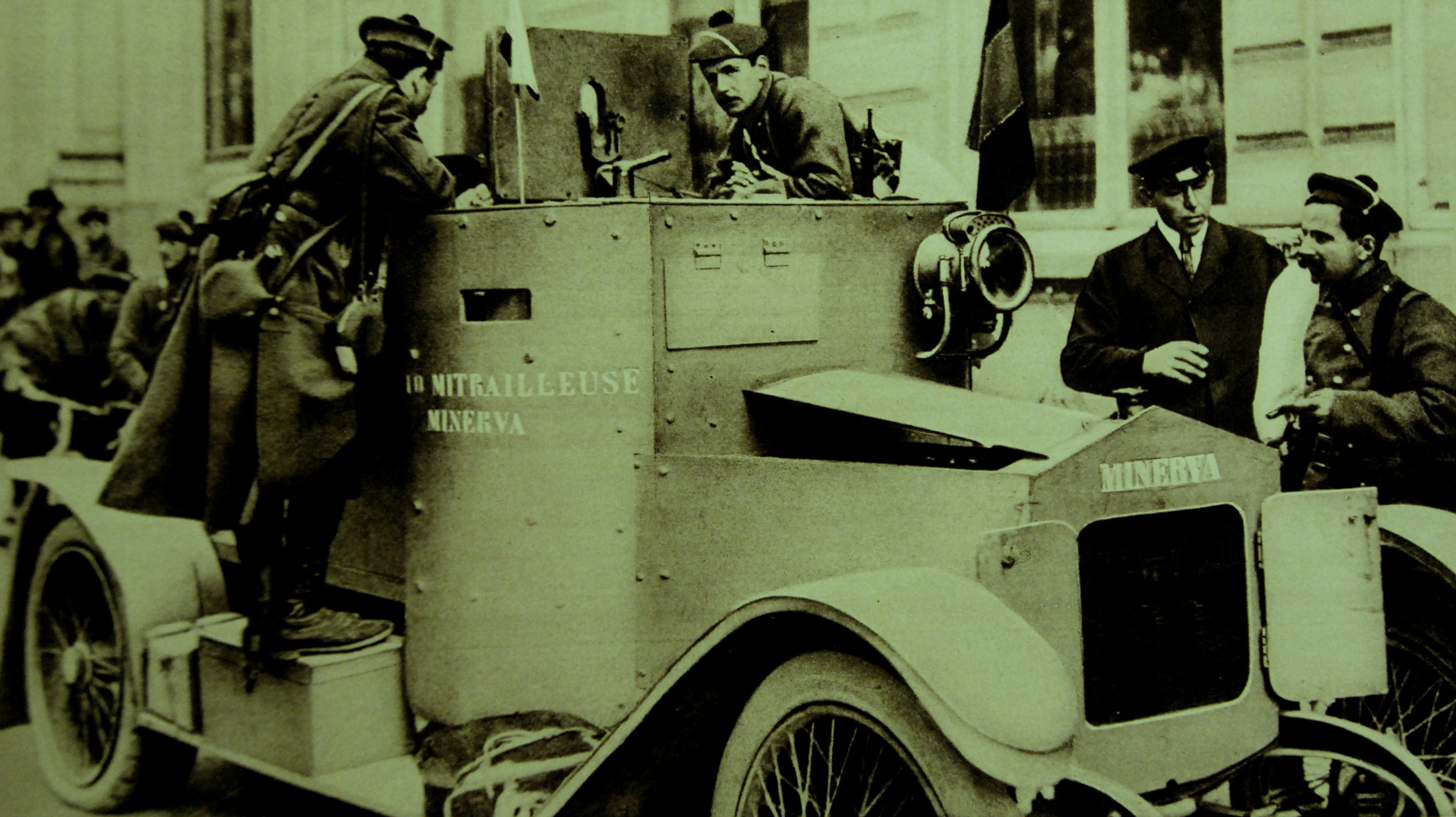
With the French Marines in 1915

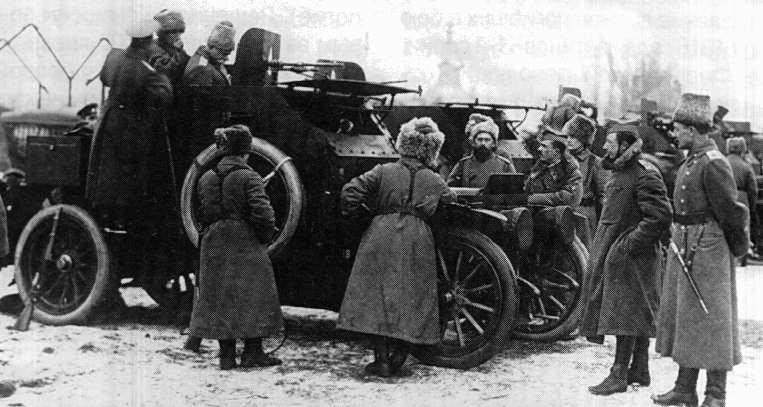
Belgian corps in Russia (1915–1917)

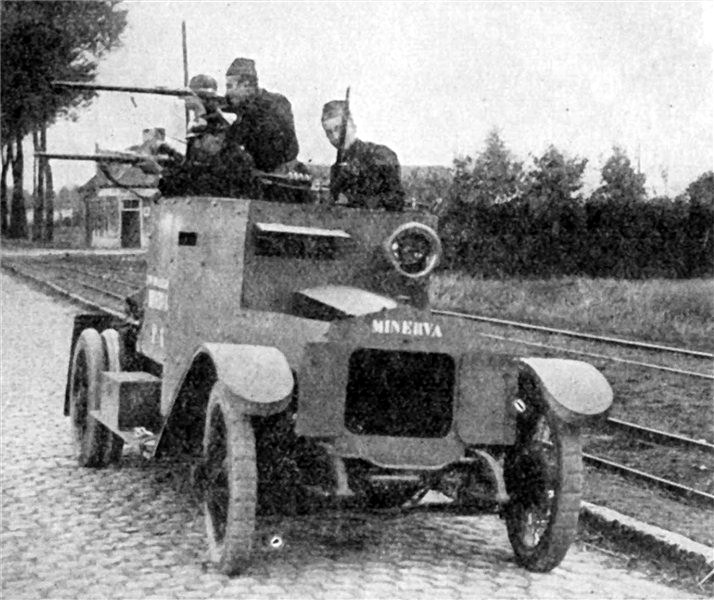
In action (1918)

The Germans were able to capture three of the cars and modified them for use during the invasion of Romania with at least one being used during the 1919 troubles.

== Bibliography ==
- Arnaud, Françoise (22 August 2014). 1914 La première et la seule, la Belgique fait usage d'autos blindées (in French). Vol. 1. Société des Ecrivains. ISBN 978-2-342-02701-3.
- Bartholomew, E. (1988). Early Armoured Cars (1988 ed.). Osprey Publishing. ISBN 978-0-85263-908-5. - Total pages: 32
- Bocquelet, David (2014). "Tanks Encyclopedia – Minerva". tanks-encyclopedia.com.
- Crow, Duncan (1970). Armoured fighting vehicles of the world (1970 ed.). Profile Publications. - Total pages: 176
- Douglas-Scott-Montagu, Edward Douglas-Scott-Montagu (1995). Daimler Century: The Full History of Britain's Oldest Car Maker (1995 ed.). Patrick Stephens. ISBN 978-1-85260-494-3. - Total pages: 304
- Gougaud, Alain (1987). L'aube de la gloire: les autos mitrailleuses et les chars français pendant la Grande Guerre, histoire technique et militaire, arme blindée, cavalerie, chars, Musée des blindés (in French) (1987 ed.). Société OCEBUR. ISBN 9782904255021. - Total pages: 248
- Macksey, Kenneth & Contributor P.H. Hordern (1980). The Guinness Book of Tank Facts and Feats: A Record of Armoured Fighting Vehicle Achievement, Volume 7 (1980 ed.). Guinness Superlatives. ISBN 978-0-85112-204-5. - Total pages: 256
- Pulsifer, Cameron (2001). "Canada's First Armoured Unit: Raymond Brutinel and the Canadian Motor Machine Gun Brigades of the First World War". Canadian Military History. 10 (1, Article 5): 44–57. ISSN 1195-8472.
- The Evening Herald (September 22, 1914). "Belgians Sighting Machine Guns on an Automobile". The Evening Herald. Klamath Falls, Oregon. ISSN 2158-4834. OCLC 41172977.
- Tucker, Spencer C. & Roberts, Priscilla Mary (2005). World War I: A Student Encyclopedia (2005 ed.). ABC-CLIO. ISBN 978-1-85109-879-8. - Total pages: 2454
- Tucker, Spencer C. (2004). Tanks: An Illustrated History of Their Impact (2004 ed.). ABC-CLIO. ISBN 978-1-57607-995-9. - Total pages: 379
- Tucker, Spencer C. & Editors Laura Matysek Wood, Justin D. Murphy (1999). The European Powers in the First World War: An Encyclopedia (1999 ed.). Taylor & Francis. ISBN 978-0-8153-3351-7. - Total pages: 783
- Tucker, Spencer C. Holder of the John Biggs Chair in Military History (2013). The European Powers in the First World War: An Encyclopedia (2013 ed.). Routledge. ISBN 978-1-135-50694-0. - Total pages: 816
