= Motor Scout =

British armed car

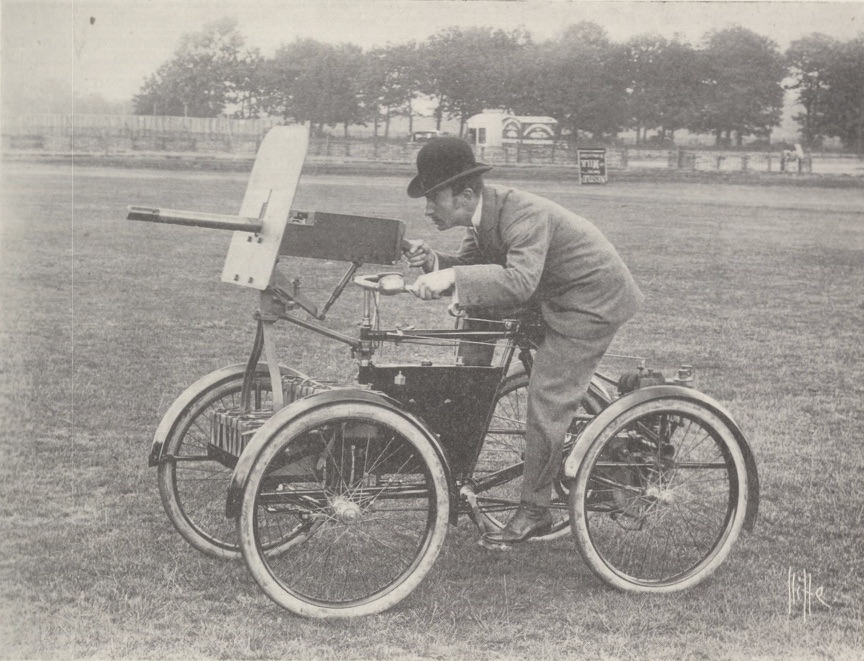
Simms's Motor Scout, in June 1899.

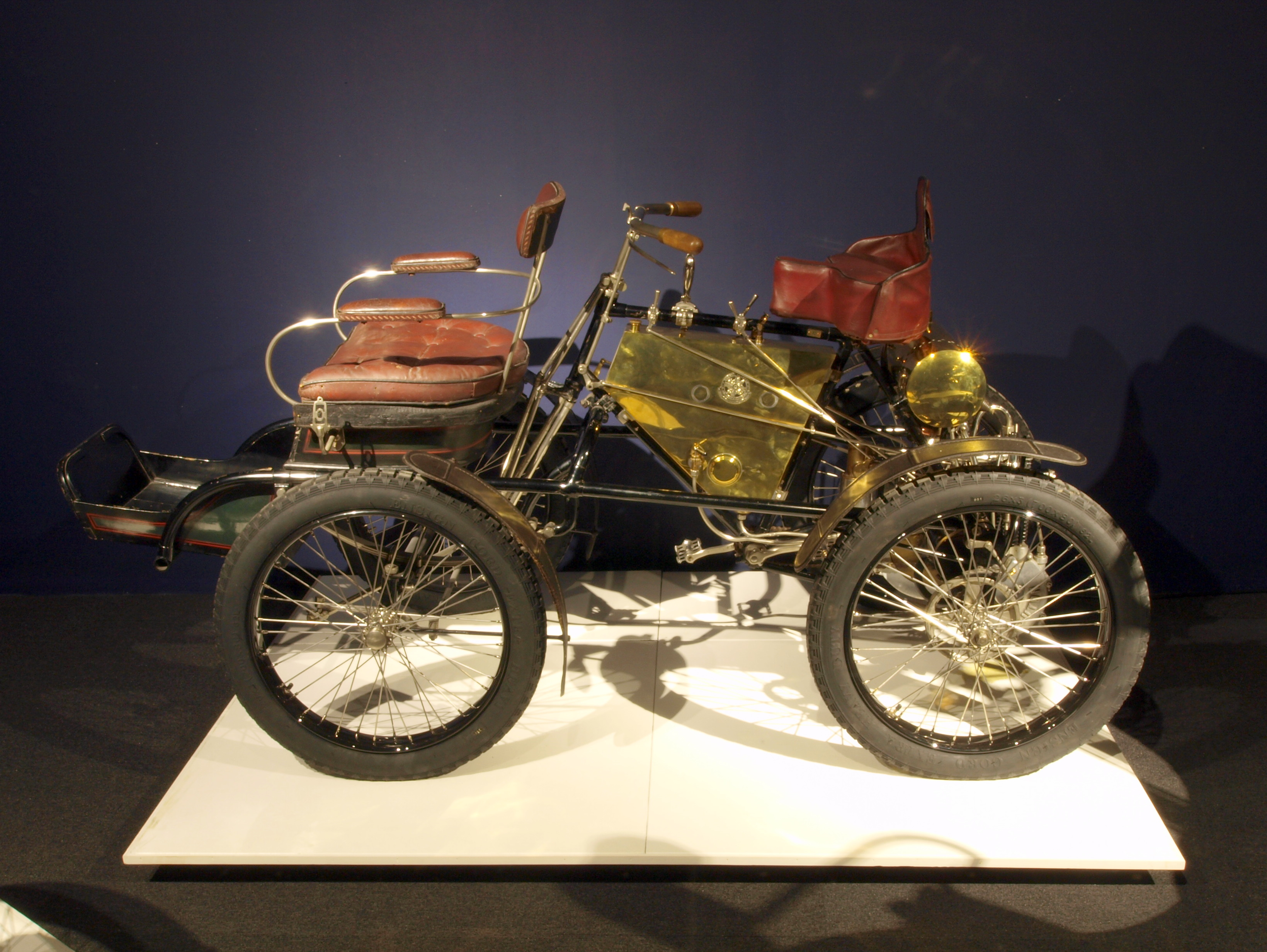
For comparison a De Dion quadricycle of 1900

The Motor Scout was the first armed petrol engine powered vehicle ever built. It was not intended for running over ploughed fields or charging, but it was designed to provide a cover or to support infantry and cavalry wherever good roads were available.

It was designed and built by British inventor F. R. Simms in 1898. He mounted a standard mark IV Maxim machine gun above the front wheels of a quadricycle. The Maxim gun, with its readily accessed 1,000 rounds of ammunition, took the place of a second rider. The driver operated the machine gun. Simms put an iron shield in front of the car for the driver's protection.

A one and a half horsepower Simms' Patent Automatic Petrol Motor, with Simms' magneto-electric ignition, was fitted and the standard tank carried enough fuel for 120 miles. The Motor Scout was convertible to a two-seated quadricycle. The quadricycle was also available without the gun for non-military purposes as a two-seated vehicle for £120.

The next vehicle designed by Simms, the Motor War Car, can be considered the world's first real armoured car.
