= Motor War Car =

British armoured car

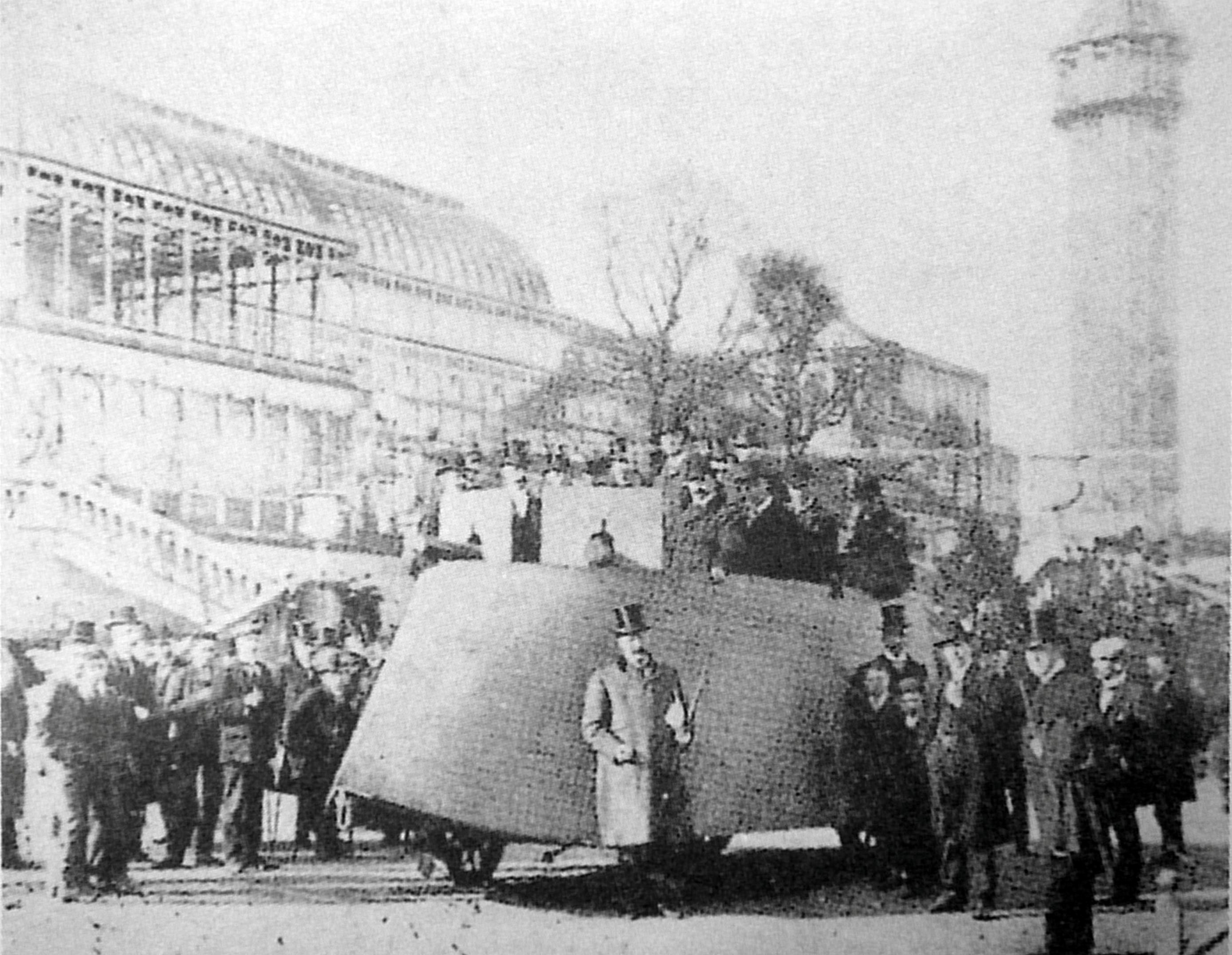
The Simms Motor War Car at the Crystal Palace, London, April 1902

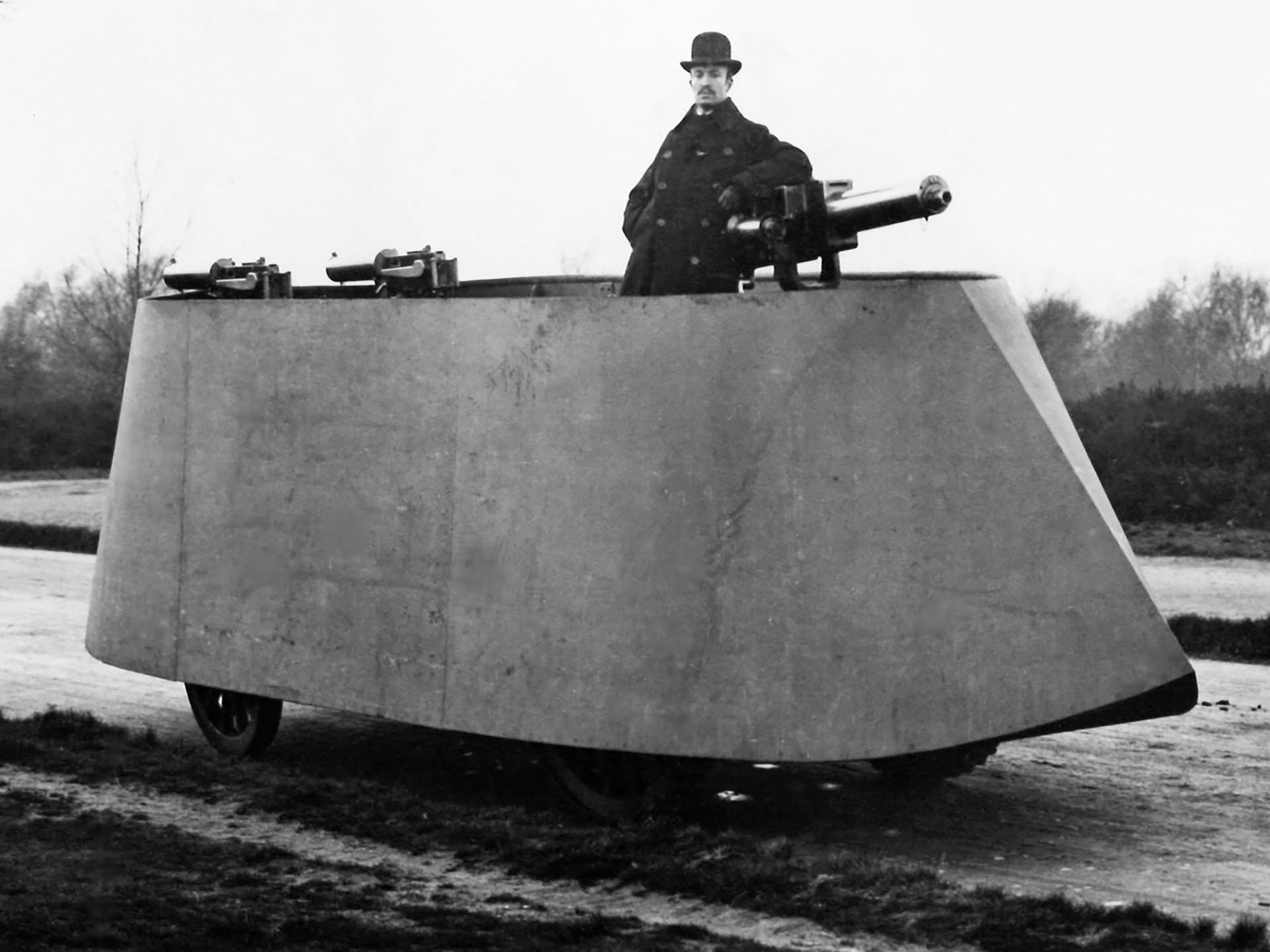
The Simms Motor War Car

The Simms Motor War Car was the first armoured car ever built, designed by F. R. Simms.

A single prototype was ordered by the British Army in April 1899, a few months before the Second Boer War broke out. It was built by Vickers, Sons & Maxim of Barrow on a special Coventry-built Daimler chassis and had a German-built Daimler engine.

Because of difficulties that arose, including a gearbox destroyed by a road accident, Vickers did not deliver the prototype until 1902, and by then the South African wars were over. The vehicle was an improvement over Simms's earlier design, known as the Motor Scout, which was the first armed (but not armoured) vehicle powered by a petrol engine.

The vehicle had Vickers armour 6 mm thick and was powered by a four-cylinder 3.3-litre 16-horsepower Cannstatt Daimler engine, giving it a maximum speed of around 9 miles per hour (14.5 km/h). The armament, consisting of two Maxim guns, was carried in two turrets with 360° traverse. Some versions of the vehicle also included a single QF 1 pounder pom-pom.

Fully equipped, the vehicle had a length of 28 feet (8.5 m) overall, with a beam of 8 feet (2.4 m), a ram at each end, two turrets, and two guns. It was "capable of running on very rough surfaces". It was designed to be operated by a crew of four men.

The Simms Motor War Car was presented at the Crystal Palace, London, in April 1902.

Another armoured car of the period was the French Charron, Girardot et Voigt 1902, presented a few weeks before at the Salon de l'Automobile et du cycle in Brussels, on 8 March 1902.
