= Austro-Daimler Panzerautomobil =

Austro-Daimler Armored Car
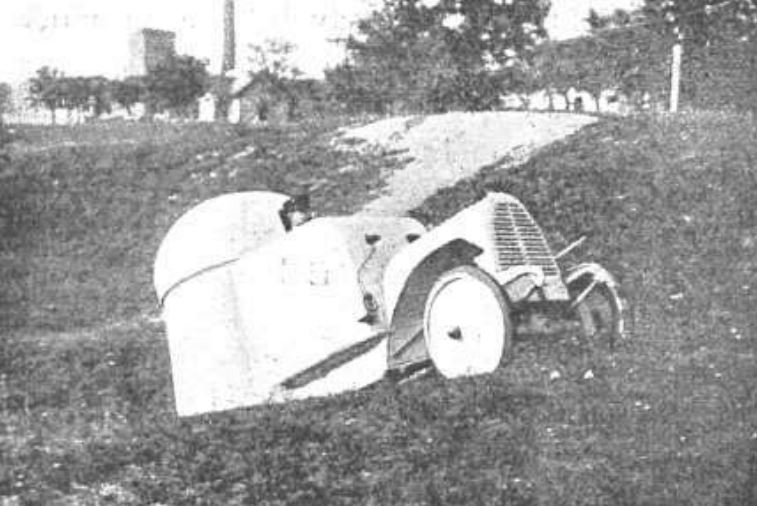

Production history
- Designer: Austro-Daimler
- Designed: 1904
- No. built: 1

Specifications
- Mass: 2-2.9 tons
- Length: 4.1 m
- Width: 2.1 m
- Height: 2.7 m
- Crew: 4
- Main armament: 7.62 Maxim machine gun
- Secondary armament: 7.62 Maxim machine gun (after upgrade)
- Engine: Daimler petrol engine, 4-cylinder, water-cooled, 4.41 liters 30-35 hp
- Maximum speed: 45 km/h
- References: https://www.heeresgeschichten.at/

The Austro-Daimler Panzerautomobil was an armored car built by Austro-Daimler in 1905 for use with the Austro-Hungarian Army.

Design of the Panzerautomobil started in 1904, based on a 4x4 drive built by Paul Daimler, with Hauptmann Robert Wolf serving as a main designer of the finished armored car itself. The fully enclosed body consisted of 3mm thick nickel steel armor, with an armored engine housing and a crew compartment housing the driver, gunner, and two crewmen. The driver had two vision slits but no side vision ports, thus limited his field of view. To compensate for this, a roof hatch was installed and the driver's seat as well as the steering mechanism could be elevated so that he could look around and drive at the same time. Armament consisted of a 7.62mm Maxim machine gun housed in a 3.5mm thick dome shaped armored turret which was capable of 360 degree rotation. The engine was a 4.4 liter, 4-cylinder Daimler piston engine capable of 30-35 (depending on the source) hp at 1050 rpm with fuel tank capacity giving approximately 10 hours worth of road travel. Front wheels (83 cm) were covered in nickel steel and the back wheels (92 cm) were partially armor covered spoked wood. All four tires were solid rubber.

The first trials took place at Daimler-Motoren-Gesellschaft after the vehicle's completion in November, 1905. It was offered to the German War Industry but rejected, so was next exhibited at the 6th Wiener Nationaler Automobilausstellung (Vienna National Automotive Exhibition) in March, 1906. There it was shown to Archduke Franz Ferdinand, Archduke Franz Salvator, Archduke Friedrich and Emperor Franz Joseph. The car received several major modifications before the Kaisermanöver (Emperor Maneuvers, annual wargames) in August/September 1906 in Schlesien. A newly designed turret with a back hatch was installed, as well as a gun port for a second machine gun. Armored thickness was increased to 4mm and the engine was replaced with one capable of 40 hp. The changes increased the weight to 3,200 kg. Oberstleutnant Heinrich Graf Schönfeld was in command of the car when it made its appearance at the wargames and spoke well of it, making a 160 km drive before the start. The press and troops were both enthusiastic about the vehicle, which also drove back from Teschen after the games ended, a 250 km journey that took two days.

Unfortunately, Austria-Hungary wasn't interested in purchasing the Panzerautomobil, so it was exhibited in Paris at the Grand Palais in December, 1906, where the French referred to it as the Austro Daimler Mercedes de 45 cv. France was interested in the vehicle, but only as a comparison to the Charron, Girardot et Voigt 1902 armored car. In January 1907 it was tested by the French Army where it exceeded expectations on rough terrain. However, the Commission d’étude des armes portatives et de petit calibre (Commission for the Study of Portable and Small Firearms) reported on 4 May 1909 that contemporary armored cars weren't fit for service due to relatively bad off-road performance and high production costs.

The AD Panzerautomobil was returned to Austria and likely scrapped a few years later. While promising, none of the armored cars of this era were ready for full time use. The design inspired a prop armored car that appeared in the movie A Fistful of Dynamite.

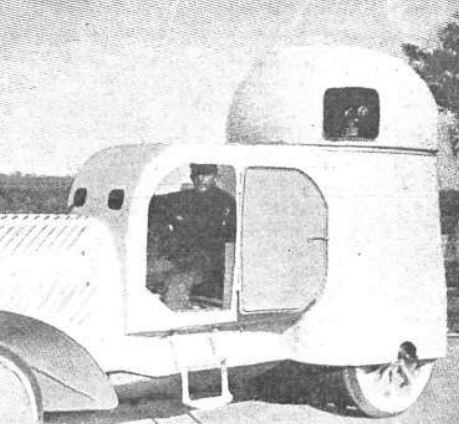
Austro-Daimler Panzerwagen 2
