= Davidson-Cadillac armored car =

- Type: Armored Vehicle
- Place of origin: United States

Production history
- Manufacturer: Northwestern Military and Naval Academy
- Produced: 1909 - 1915

Specifications
- Crew: driver + 3
- Main armament: M1895 Colt-Browning
- Suspension: 4x2 wheel

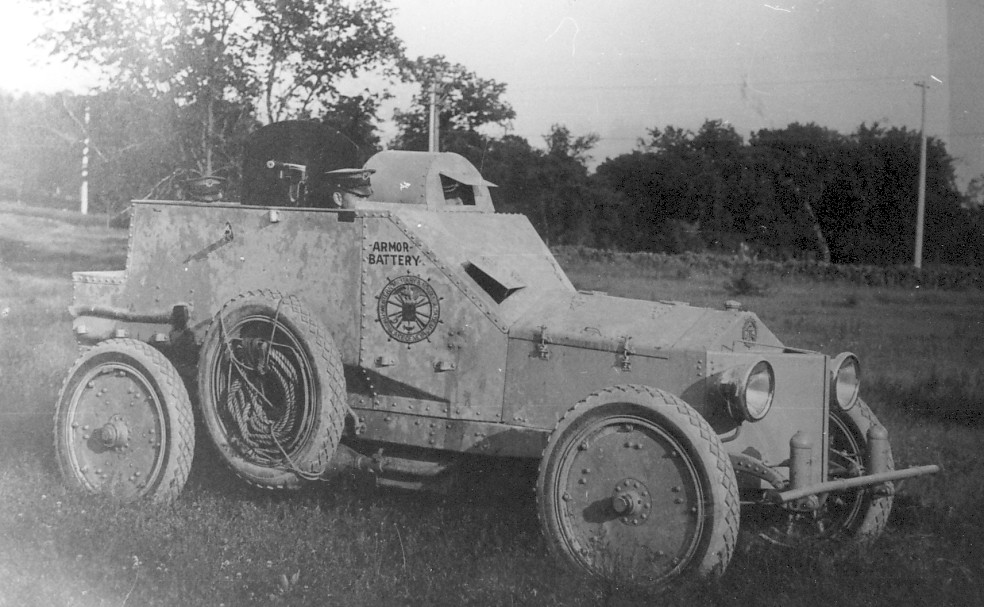
Davidson armoured car in 1915

The Davidson-Cadillac armored car was developed on a Cadillac chassis by Royal Page Davidson and the cadets of the Northwestern Military and Naval Academy in Highland Park, Illinois. It was the first all-around armored car developed in the United States. To convince the military that a mechanized army was the way to go, Davidson and some cadets drove the fully armoured car along with seven support cars for 34 days from the academy to the Panama-Pacific International Exposition (1915) being held in San Francisco, California. While not accepted by the military, it was used (along with other cars) by the cadets until 1927.

== Bibliography ==
- New York Times - July 18, 1915 - "This Armored Motor Car is now touring across the continent."
- American men of mark (1917), A Thousand American Men of Mark Today
- Chilton company (1975), Automotive Industries, Item notes: v.77 1937 Jul-Dec
- Clemens, Al J., The American Military Armored Car, A.J. Clemens, 1969
- Delta Upsilon fraternity (1902), The Delta Upsilon Decennial Catalogue [1903]
- Hunnicutt, R.P., Armored Car: A History of American Wheeled Combat Vehicle, Presidio Press (2002), ISBN 0-89141-777-X
- Marquis-Who's Who (1950), Who was who in America. 1943-1950, New Providence, New Jersey
- Marquis-Who's Who (1967), Who was who in America: A Companion Biographical Reference Work to Who's who in America
- Quaife, Milo Milton, Wisconsin: Its History and Its People 1634-1924, Volume 4, S.J. Clarke Publishing Company (1924)
- Randall, Frank Alfred, Randall and Allied Families, Raveret-Weber printing company (1943)
- Stern, Philip Van Doren, A Pictorial History of the Automobile, Viking Press (1953)
- Tucker, Spencer, Tanks: An Illustrated History of Their Impact, ISBN 1-57607-995-3
- Willcox, Cornélis De Witt, The International Military Digest Annual: A Review of the Current Literature of Military Science for 1915-1918, Cumulative Digest Corporation (1916)
