= Belgian expeditionary corps in Russia =

Belgian Expeditionary Corps in Russia
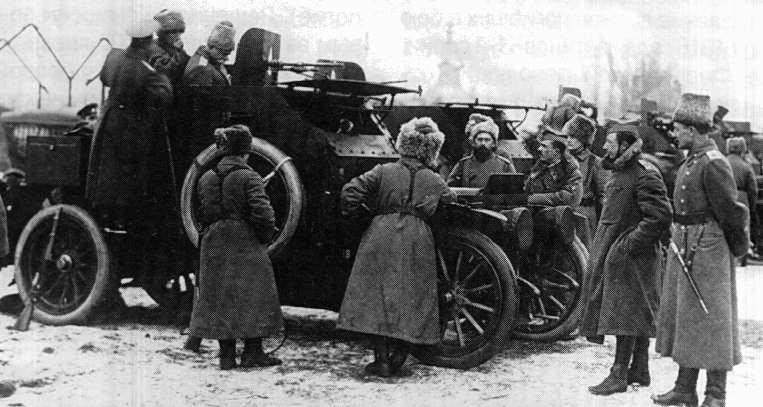
- Mors-Minerva armoured car of the Belgian Expeditionary Corps in Russia, c. January 1916
- Active: 1915–1918
- Disbanded: July 1918
- Country: Belgium
- Allegiance: Russian Empire (1915–17); Russian Provisional Government (1917)
- Branch: Imperial Russian Army
- Type: Mechanised
- Role: Mobile reconnaissance
- Size: 444 men (total)
- Garrison/HQ: Peterhof, Saint Petersburg (1915)
- Equipment: Mors, Minerva and Peugeot armoured cars
- Engagements: Eastern Front

The Belgian Expeditionary Corps of Armoured Cars in Russia (French: Corps Expeditionnaire des Autos-Canons-Mitrailleuses Belges en Russie, Dutch: Belgisch expeditiekorps van pantserwagens in Rusland, Russian: Бельгийский экспедиционный корпус бронеавтомобилей в России) was a Belgian military unit sent to Russia during World War I. It fought alongside the Imperial Russian army on the Eastern Front. Between 1915 and 1918, 444 Belgian soldiers served with the unit of whom 16 were killed in action.

== History ==
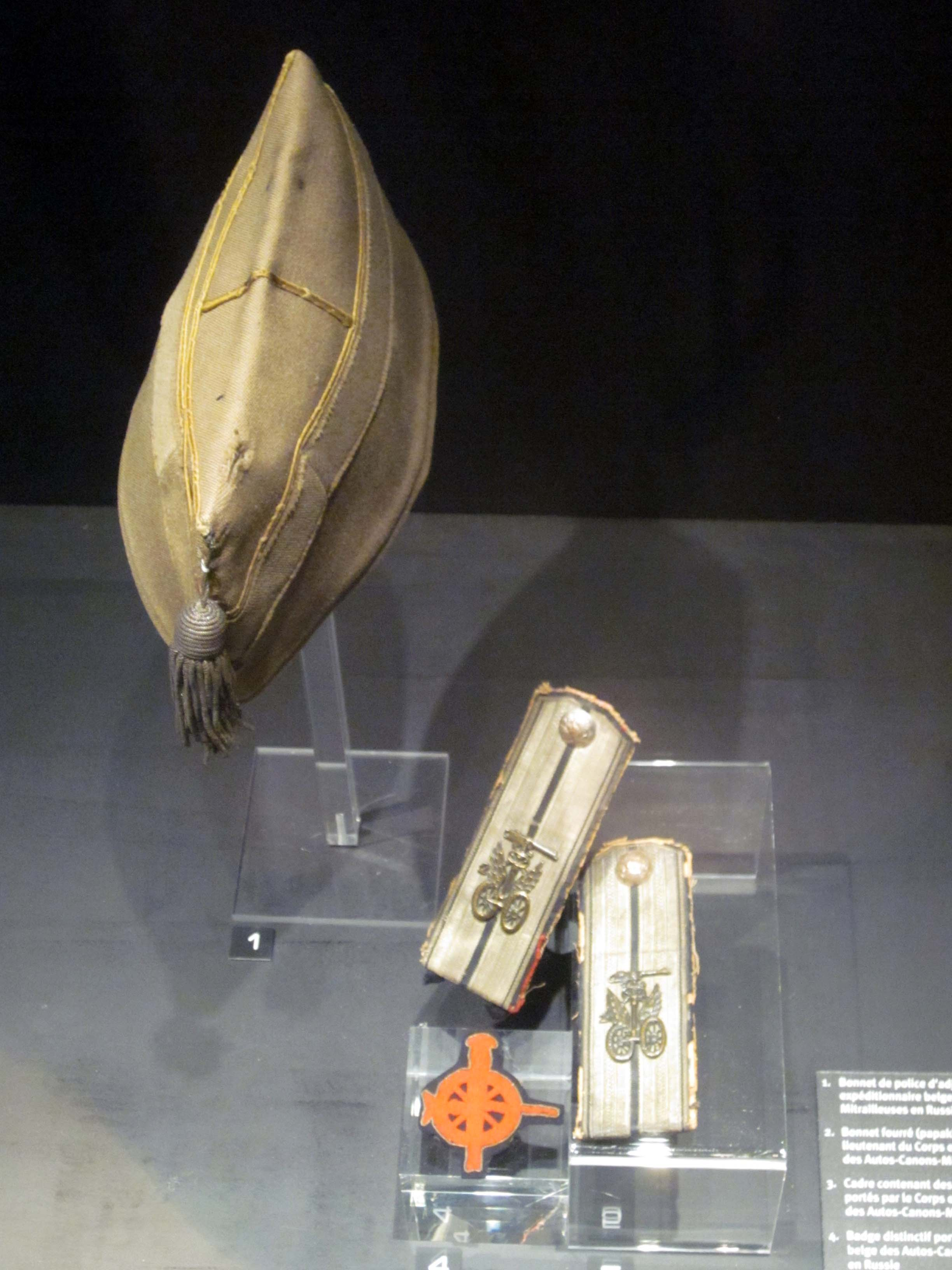
Items of uniform worn by members of the Expeditionary Force

In August 1914, the German Empire invaded neutral Belgium. The campaign was initially very successful, pushing the Belgian, French and British forces westwards. By the end of 1914, however, the Western Front had stabilised into static trench warfare. Following the Battle of the Yser in October, the Belgian army remained entrenched along the Yser Front and was left with a number of armoured cars which could not be used. In early 1915, the Russian Tsar Nicholas II formally requested military support from King Albert I and a self-contained unit was formed for service in Russia. As Belgium was officially an independent neutral power rather than an ally of the Russian Empire, Belgian soldiers in this unit were officially considered as volunteers in the Imperial Russian Army itself.

The first contingent of the Belgian Expeditionary Corps (333 volunteers equipped with Mors and Peugeot armoured cars) arrived in Archangel in October 1915. The unit fought with distinction in Galicia and was mentioned in the Order of the Day five times.

After the Bolshevik Revolution in 1917, the Belgian force remained in Russia until the Treaty of Brest-Litovsk withdrew Russia from the war. After the ceasefire, the unit found itself in hostile territory. As the route north to Murmansk was blocked, the soldiers destroyed their armoured cars to prevent their capture by Bolshevik forces. The unit finally reached the United States through China and the Trans-Siberian Railway in June 1918.

A similar, slightly larger, British unit, the RNAS Armoured Car Expeditionary Force (ACEF), also served in Russia during the same period.

=== Notable personnel ===
The unit was never particularly numerous, but included some notable personnel:

- Henri Herd, known as "Constant le Marin", who was a prominent wrestler and 4-time World Champion.
- Henry George, track cyclist who won a gold medal at the 1920 Summer Olympics
- Julien Lahaut, politician and later head of the Communist Party of Belgium who served from 1915 to 1918.
- Marcel Thiry, Walloon poet, who served in the corps with his brother Oscar.
- Théo Halleux, construction contractor who built the first high multi-story buildings in Liège.

== Commemoration ==
From 1931, soldiers who had served with the unit were awarded the 1914–1918 Commemorative War Medal with a bar (reading "1916—R—1917" or "1916—R—1918") denoting service in Russia. The last veteran of the unit died in 1992.

In 2014–15, the Royal Museum of the Armed Forces and Military History in Brussels raised 40,000 euros towards building a replica Mors-Minerva armoured car. The vehicle went on display in the markings of the Expeditionary Corps in 2015.

== In fiction and in popular culture ==
The 2015 Belgian animated drama-action film Cafard ("Cockroach" in French) tells the story of a boxer, Jean Mordant (based on the real-life Henri Herd, known as Constant le Marin), who joins the Expeditionary Corps in order to avenge the rape of his daughter by German soldiers in occupied Belgium.

The band 1914 wrote a song called "Corps d’autos-canons-mitrailleuses (A.C.M)" in the album Where Fear and Weapons Meet about the Expeditionary Corps on the Eastern Front and their subsequent journey home after two years and the 1917 Bolshevik Revolution.

== See also ==
- Russian Expeditionary Force in France
- Belgian Legion
- Belgian Volunteer Corps for Korea
