= Davidson-Duryea gun carriage =

- Type: Armored Vehicle
- Place of origin: United States

Production history
- Designer: Charles Duryea
- Manufacturer: Duryea Motor Wagon Company
- Produced: 1899

Specifications
- Crew: driver + 3
- Main armament: M1895 Colt-Browning
- Suspension: 3x2 and 4x2 wheel

The Davidson-Duryea gun carriage was originally a 3 wheel armed vehicle built by the Duryea Motor Wagon Company in 1899. The gun carriage was ordered by Royal Page Davidson of the Northwestern Military and Naval Academy in Highland Park, Illinois. One Northwestern cadet wrote: "With this gun you could sneak upon an enemy and fire 480 shots and get away before they would know what happened." In 1900 the carriage was modified to 4 wheels and eventually into the Davidson Auto Battery armored car.

== Sources ==
- American men of mark (1917), A Thousand American Men of Mark Today
- Clemens, Al J., The American Military Armored Car, A.J. Clemens, 1969
- Delta Upsilon fraternity (1902), The Delta Upsilon Decennial Catalogue [1903]
- Hunnicutt, R.P., Armored Car: A History of American Wheeled Combat Vehicle, Presidio Press (2002), ISBN 0-89141-777-X
- Marquis-Who's Who (1950), Who was who in America. 1943-1950, New Providence, New Jersey
- Marquis-Who's Who (1967), Who was who in America: A Companion Biographical Reference Work to Who's who in America
- Quaife, Milo Milton, Wisconsin: Its History and Its People 1634-1924, Volume 4, S.J. Clarke Publishing Company (1924)
- Randall, Frank Alfred, Randall and Allied Families, Raveret-Weber printing company (1943)
- St. John's Military Academy, A History of Excellence: St. John's Northwestern Military Academy, Delafield, Wis., self-published (2002)
- Stern, Philip Van Doren, A Pictorial History of the Automobile, Viking Press (1953)
- Tucker, Spencer, World War I: Encyclopedia, ABC-CLIO, 2005, ISBN 1-85109-420-2
- The Engineering Index By Association of Engineering Societies (U.S.), Engineering Magazine (1901), vol 3 1896/1900, page 53
- Marquis-Who's Who (1967), p. 64 Royal Page Davidson designed the first armored car.
- The Horseless Age: The Automobile Trade Magazine, published by The Horseless Age Company (1909), page 342
- Patent No. 653,224 items 10 - 20.
- Scientific American, Jan. 27, 1900; p. 59
- The Horseless Age, Vol. 4 No. 25, Sept. 20, 1899
- "Armored Car to Return". The Lake Geneva Regional News. Lake Geneva, Wisconsin. March 26, 1987. p. 11 – via Newspapers.com.
