= Ignition magneto =

Part of an engine's ignition system

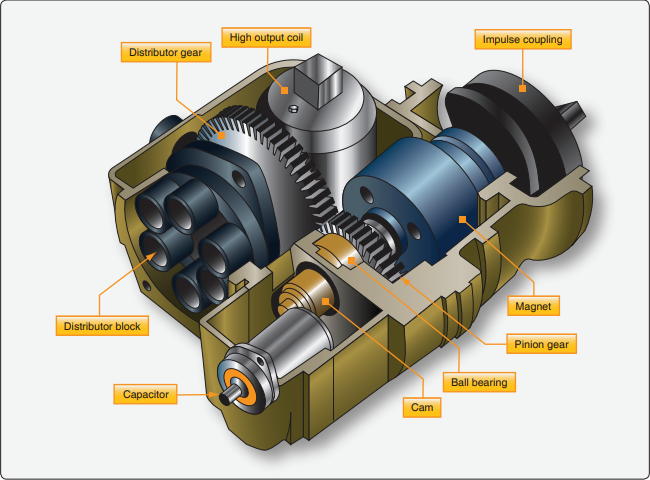
Magneto components

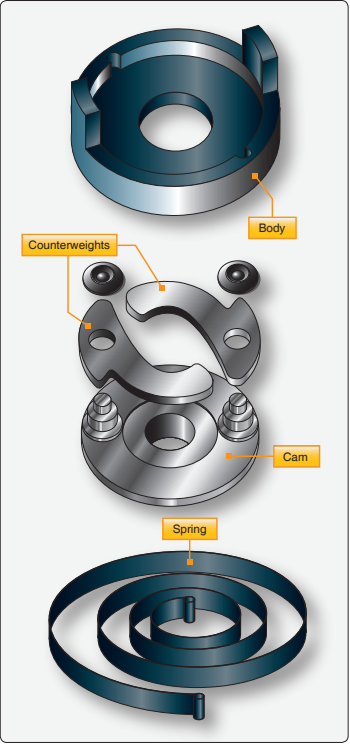
Impulse coupling components

An ignition magneto (also called a high-tension magneto) is an older type of ignition system used in spark-ignition engines (such as petrol engines). It uses a magneto and a transformer to make pulses of high voltage for the spark plugs. The older term "high-tension" means "high-voltage".

== Design ==
A simple magneto (an electrical generator using permanent magnets) is able to produce relatively low voltage electricity, however it is unable to produce the high voltages required by a spark plug as used in most modern engines (aside from diesel engines). An ignition magneto also includes an electrical transformer, which converts the electricity to a higher voltage (with the trade-off being a corresponding reduction in the output current).

As the points begin to open, point spacing is initially such that the voltage across the primary coil will spark across the points. A capacitor is placed across the points which absorbs the energy stored in the leakage inductance of the primary coil, and slows the rise time of the primary winding voltage to allow the points to open fully.

A second coil, with many more turns than the primary, is wound on the same iron core to form an electrical transformer. The ratio of turns in the secondary winding to the number of turns in the primary winding, is called the turns ratio. Voltage across the primary coil results in a proportional voltage being induced across the secondary winding of the coil. The turns ratio between the primary and secondary coil is selected so that the voltage across the secondary reaches a very high value, enough to spark across the gap of the spark plug. As the voltage of the primary winding rises to several hundred volts, the voltage on the secondary winding rises to several tens of thousands of volts, since the secondary winding typically has 100 times as many turns as the primary winding.

=== Impulse coupling, induction vibrator, and booster coil ===
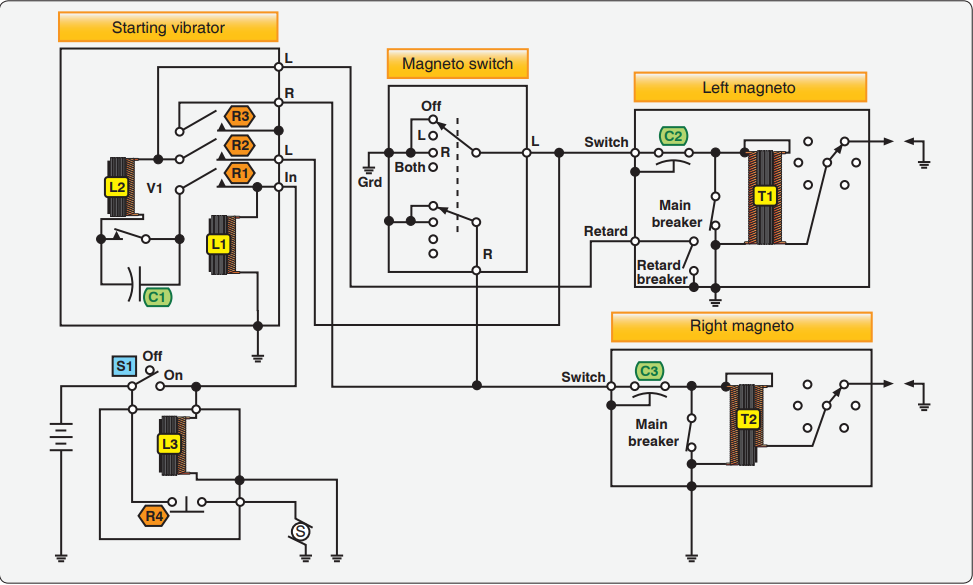
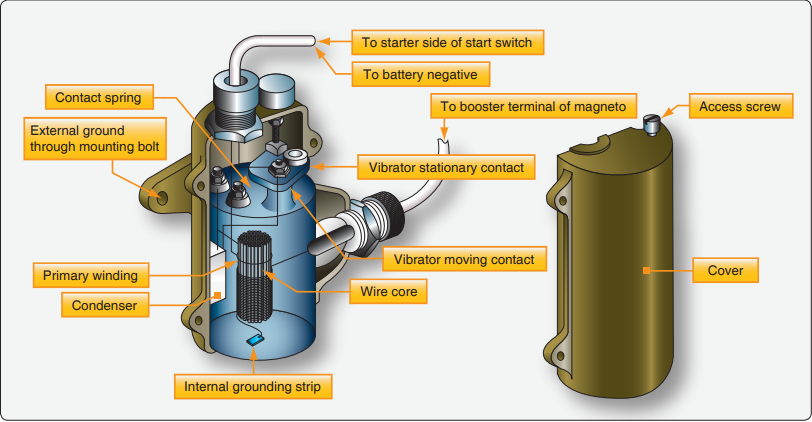
(Left) In a vibrator coil, points open and close rapidly, creating pulsating DC, or interrupted battery current. Electrical current flows from the battery through R1, vibrator points V1, and coil L2. The energized coil L2 opens vibrator points V1, interrupting the current flow through L2. The magnetic field about L2 collapses, and vibrator points V1 close again. Once more, current flows through L2, and again V1 vibrator points open. This process is repeated continuously, creating a "shower of sparks." (Right) Booster coil components. The booster coil is separate from the magneto and can generate a series of sparks on its own. Current flow through the primary coil sets up a magnetic field about the coil that attracts the movable contact point, breaking circuit is broken. The movable contact point then moves back to the stationary contact point via a spring. This sets up the current flow once again in a repetitive process.

Because the magneto has low voltage output at low speed, starting an engine is more difficult. Therefore, some magnetos have an impulse coupling, a spring-like mechanical linkage between the engine and magneto drive shaft which "winds up" and "lets go" at the proper moment for spinning the magneto shaft. The impulse coupling uses a spring, a hub cam with flyweights, and a shell. The hub of the magneto rotates while the drive shaft is held stationary, and the spring tension builds up. When the magneto is supposed to fire, the flyweights are released by the action of the body contacting the trigger ramp. This allows the spring to unwind giving the rotating magnet a rapid rotation and letting the magneto spin at such a speed to produce a spark.

== History ==
In the late 1890s, English engineer Frederick Richard Simms collaborated with the German engineer Robert Bosch, and his staff of Arnold Zähringer, Young Rall, and Gottlob Honold, in developing the first practical high-tension magneto. In 1900, the Bosch magneto ignition was used in the Gottlieb Daimler engines on the Zeppelin.

The first car to use magneto ignition was the 1901 German Mercedes 35 hp racing car, followed by various cars produced by Benz, Mors, Turcat-Mery, and Nesseldorf. Ignition magnetos were soon used on most cars, for both low voltage systems (which used secondary coils to fire the spark plugs) and high voltage magnetos (which fired the spark plug directly, similar to induction coil ignition). Ignition magnetos were largely replaced by ignition coils once batteries became common in cars, since a battery-operated coil can provide a high-voltage spark even at low speeds, making starting easier.

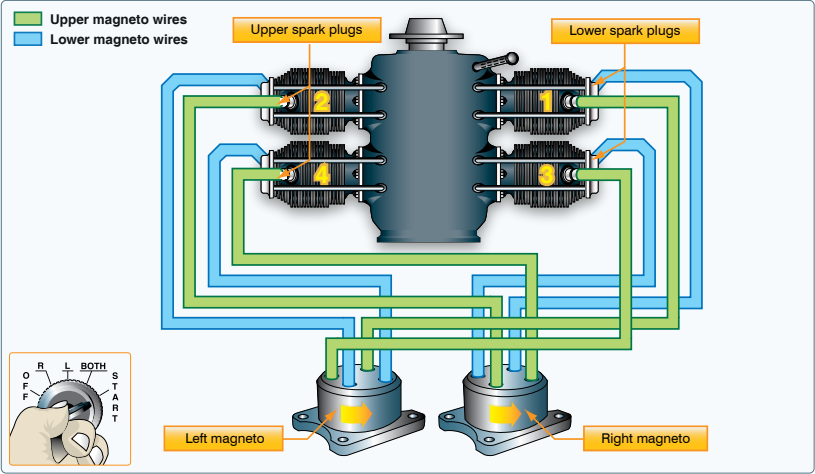
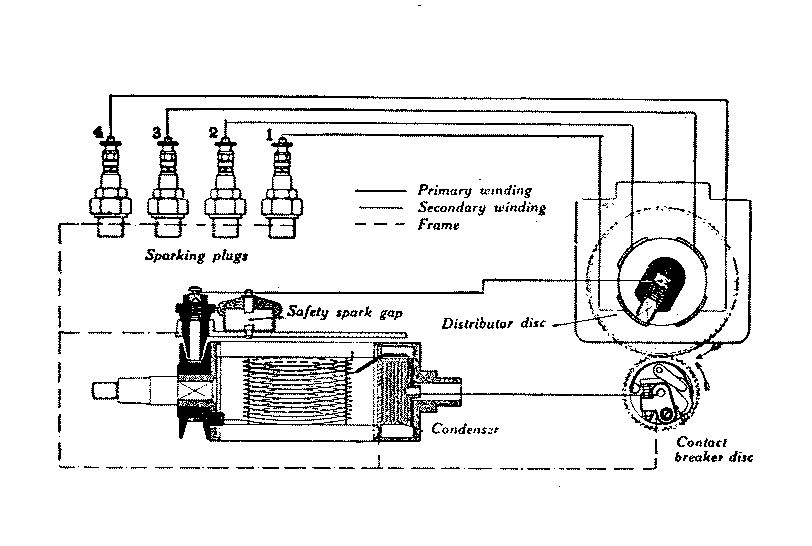
(Left) Aircraft dual ignition system with two individual magnetos, separate sets of wires, and spark plugs, increases reliability. (Right) Bosch magneto circuit diagram from 1911.
