= Davidson Automobile Battery armored car =

Davidson Auto Battery
- Type: Armored Vehicle
- Place of origin: United States

Production history
- Designed: 1900
- Manufacturer: Northwestern Military and Naval Academy

Specifications
- Crew: driver + 3
- Main armament: M1895 Colt-Browning
- Engine: Steam tubular boiler
- Suspension: 4x2 wheel

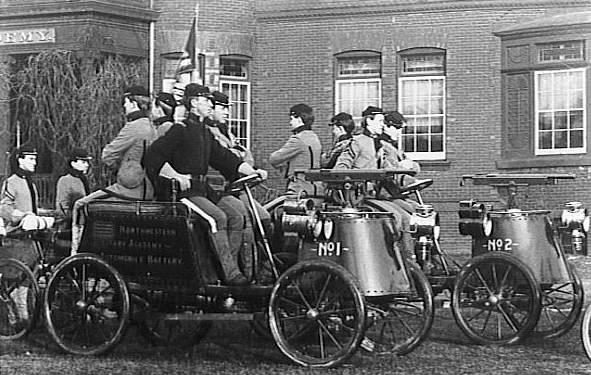
Two armored cars built by Royal P. Davidson in 1900

The Davidson Auto Battery armored car was a further development of the Davidson-Duryea gun carriage but with steam power. It was built by Royal Page Davidson and the cadets of the Northwestern Military and Naval Academy in Highland Park, Illinois.

== Sources ==
- Daily Herald (newspaper) by Diana Dretske. Military academy made unique contributions to history:[Lake Edition], Arlington Heights, Ill.: Paddock Publications Nov 11, 2001. pg. 1
- "Royal Page Davidson Armored Car". Archived from the original on 2011-07-19.
- American men of mark (1917), A Thousand American Men of Mark Today
- Clemens, Al J., The American Military Armored Car, A.J. Clemens, 1969
- Clymer, Joseph Floyd et al., Treasury of Early American Automobiles, 1877–1925, McGraw-Hill (1950)
- Delta Upsilon fraternity (1902), The Delta Upsilon Decennial Catalogue [1903]
- Hunnicutt, R.P., Armored Car: A History of American Wheeled Combat Vehicle, Presidio Press (2002), ISBN 0-89141-777-X
- Marquis-Who's Who (1950), Who was who in America. 1943-1950, New Providence, New Jersey
- Marquis-Who's Who (1967), Who was who in America: A Companion Biographical Reference Work to Who's who in America
- Quaife, Milo Milton, Wisconsin: Its History and Its People 1634-1924, Volume 4, S.J. Clarke Publishing Company (1924)
- Randall, Frank Alfred, Randall and Allied Families, Raveret-Weber printing company (1943)
- St. John's Military Academy, A History of Excellence: St. John's Northwestern Military Academy, Delafield, Wis., self-published (2002)
- Stern, Philip Van Doren, A Pictorial History of the Automobile: As Seen in Motor Magazine 1903-1953, Viking Press (1953)
- Tucker, Spencer, Tanks: An Illustrated History of Their Impact, ISBN 1-57607-995-3
- Willcox, Cornélis De Witt, The International Military Digest Annual: A Review of the Current Literature of Military Science for 1915-1918, Cumulative Digest Corporation (1916)
