= Royal Page Davidson =

Educator / inventor (1870–1943)

Colonel Royal Page Davidson
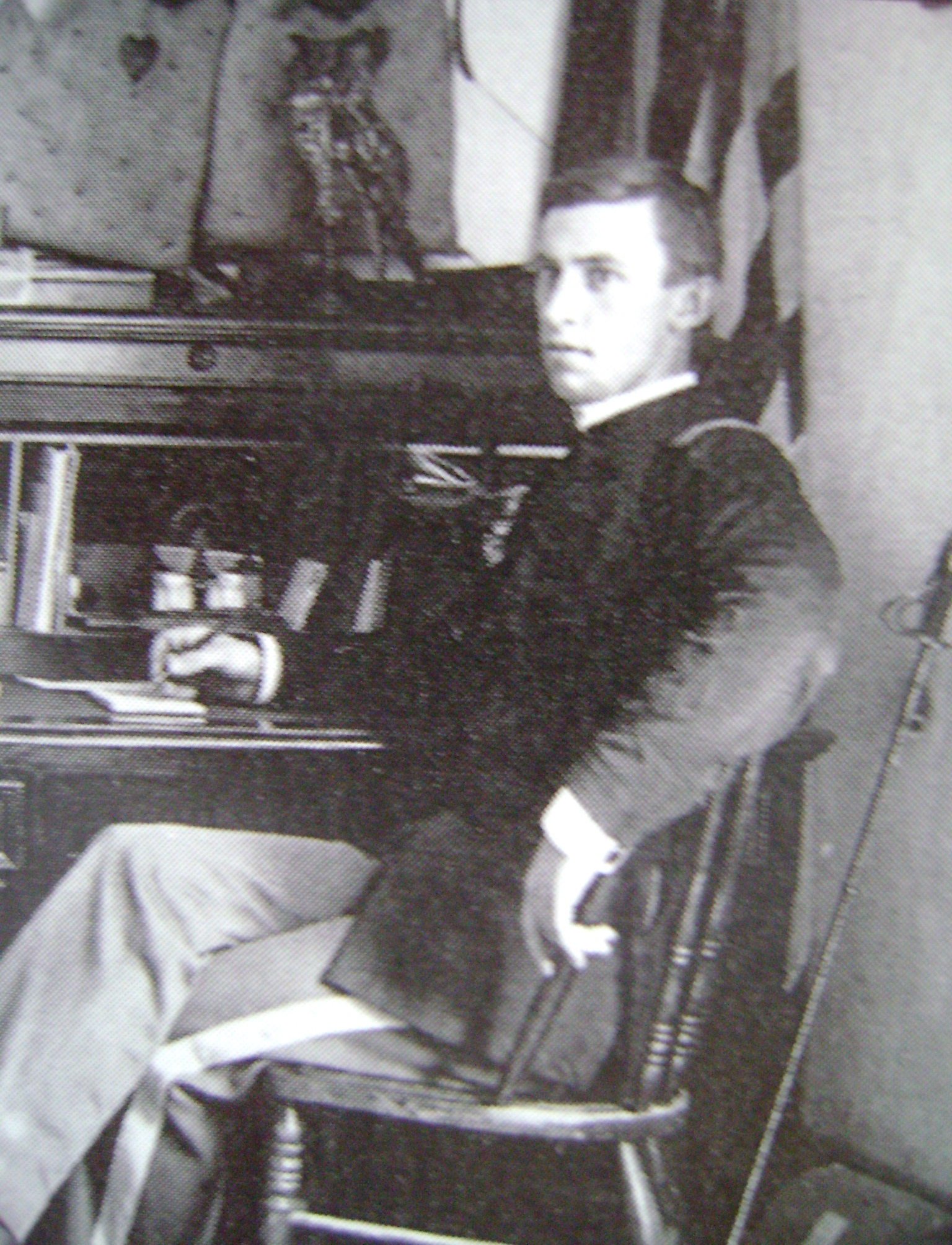
- Born: October 9, 1870; Somerville, New Jersey, U.S.
- Died: January 16, 1943 (aged 72); Northwestern Military and Naval Academy, Wisconsin, U.S.
- Engineering career
- Institutions: Northwestern Military and Naval Academy
- Significant design: Davidson-Cadillac armored car, Davidson Automobile Battery armored car

Colonel Royal Page Davidson (October 9, 1870 – January 16, 1943) was an American inventor and educator, from Somerville, New Jersey. He was based in Northwestern Military and Naval Academy, which was founded by his father Harlan Page Davidson. He developed the Davidson-Cadillac armored car, and the Davidson Automobile Battery armored car. From 1925, Davidson developed a then 9-hole golf course in Avon Park, Florida.
