= Frederick Richard Simms =

British engineer, businessman, and inventor (1863–1944)

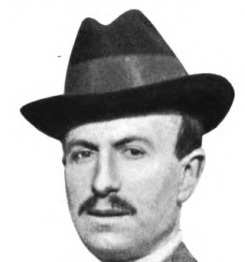
- Simms in 1909
- Born: August 12, 1863; Hamburg, Germany
- Died: April 22, 1944 (aged 80); Stoke Poges, Buckinghamshire
- Occupations: Engineer, inventor, businessman
- Known for: Founding the Royal Automobile Club and the Society of Motor Manufacturers and Traders
- Notable work: Motor Scout, the first internal combustion powered, armed vehicle; Motor War Car, the first armoured car

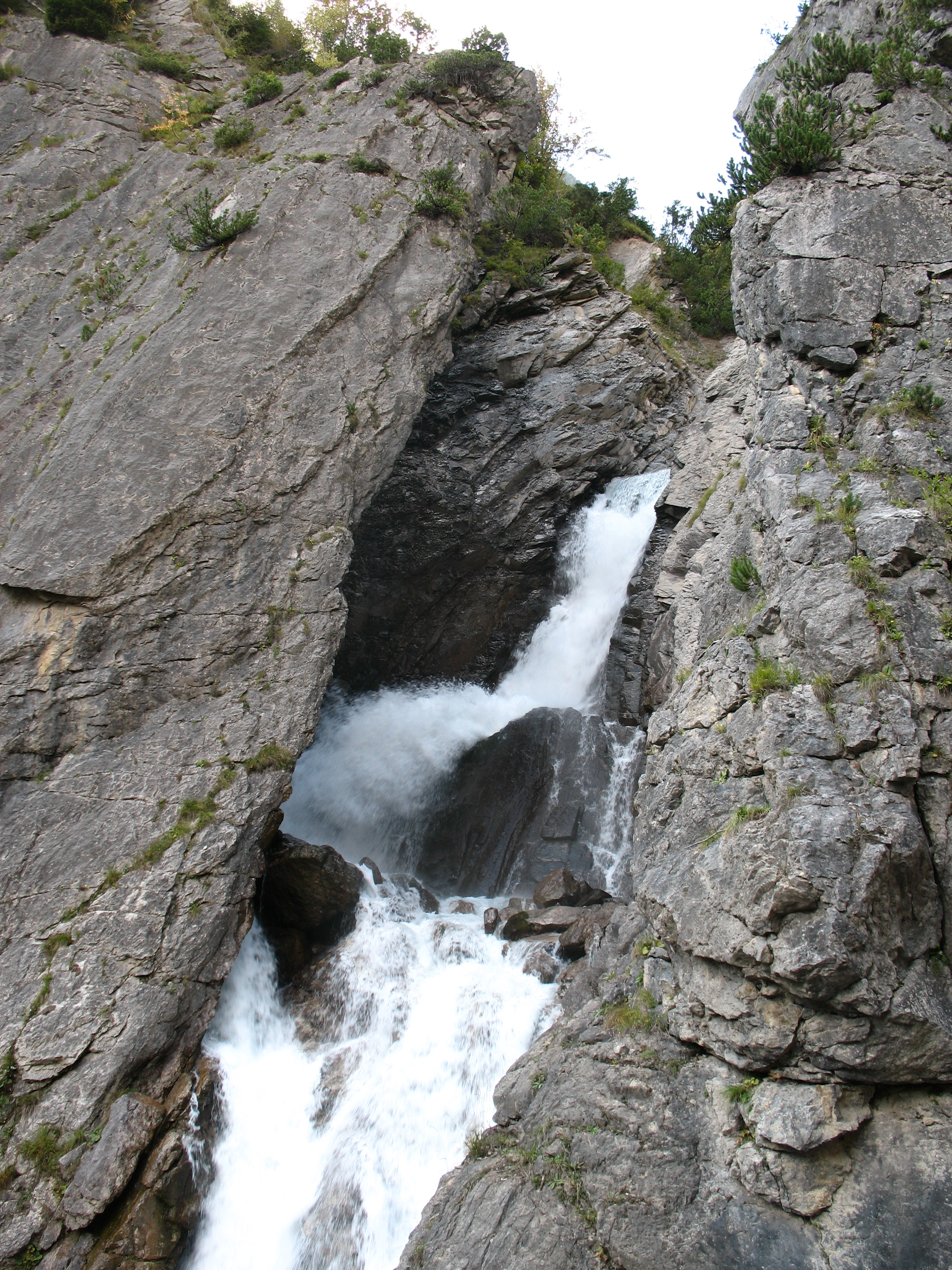
The cascade of the Simmswasserfall in the Allgäuer Alps

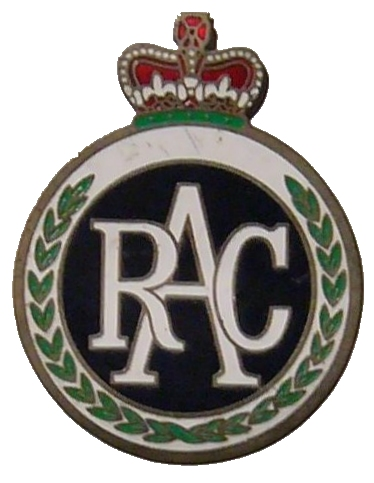
Simms founded the Automobile Club of Great Britain (later the RAC) in 1897. (Note: He founded the RAC entirely on his own initiative and at his own expense. The club's first premises at 4 Whitehall Court were engaged by Simms in his own name as the club had still to be founded. He became the vice-chairman. On 8 December 1922 a dinner was given to celebrate the twenty-fifth anniversary of the Royal Automobile Club at which the Prince of Wales (later Duke of Windsor) was present and Simms was presented with an illuminated address by the chairman, Sir Arthur Stanley. Simms' obituary, The Times)

Frederick Richard Simms (12 August 1863 in Hamburg – 22 April 1944) (Note: M.I.M.E., M.I.A.E., M.I.Ae.E., M.S.E.; Member of the Institution of Mechanical Engineers, Member of the Institution of Automobile Engineers, Member of the Institution of Aeronautical Engineers, Member of the Society of Engineers) was a Germany-born British mechanical engineer, businessman, prolific inventor and motor industry pioneer who cooperated with German automotive pioneers Gottlieb Daimler and Robert Bosch. Simms coined the words "petrol" and "motorcar". (Note: Simms wrote from Berlin to his solicitor in London on 8 February 1891 telling Hendriks he had come to an agreement with Daimler and in that letter he uses petrol and motor car. Later Gottlieb Daimler claimed the word petrol had been in common use in England when he lived there in the 1860s.) He founded the Royal Automobile Club, and the Society of Motor Manufacturers and Traders.

== Family and education ==
Simms was born in Hamburg "of an old Warwickshire family", the son of Frederick Louis Simms and his wife Antonia, née Hermans. His Birmingham-born grandfather had established a trading company there to support the Newfoundland fishing fleet. Frederick Richard Simms' first wife was Austrian. His second, married in 1910, was Mabel Louise, daughter of cotton merchant Joseph Worsley. They had two daughters, one of whom was Rosemary Mabel, who married the Artist Dennis Ramsay. Simms was educated in Germany and London, and at the Polytechnischer Verein in Berlin, after completing an apprenticeship with AG für Automatischen Verkauf in Hamburg and Berlin.

In a 1907 trip to the Allgäu Alps, Simms discovered a waterfall near the village of Holzgau, now called the Simmswasserfall.

Simms's career encompassed a wide variety of pursuits across multiple disciplines. Historically, he is primarily noted for his role in facilitating connections between Britain, continental Europe, and the United States.

He died in his 81st year, at Stoke Poges, Buckinghamshire, while living at Storth Oaks, Chislehurst, Kent. His wife predeceased him.

== Business ==
=== Consulting engineer and Daimler motors ===
In 1889, the 26-year-old Simms met (Note: Simms was impressed by Daimler's motor when supervising construction of an aerial cableway of Simms own design for the Bremen Exhibition in 1889. 55 years old, Daimler had set up a system of little canopied, five passengers each side, railcars "tirelessly ferrying passengers around the Bremen showground as if by magic". Simms began to assist Daimler to promote the use of these engines, particularly for boats. In one case they gatecrashed a Marine Salvage Corps demonstration and illicitly ran their launch in front of the Kaiser and his admirals on a lake by the imperial palace of Sans Souci. Later in the day Simms was invited to explain the engine to the Kaiser,) and became firm friends with Gottlieb Daimler, from whom in 1890 he bought the rights for the use and manufacture of Daimler's high-speed petrol engine (Note: Daimler had been technical director of the Deutz gas-engine factory from 1872–1882. He then set up his own business with former colleague Wilhelm Maybach to develop the world's first high-speed lightweight internal combustion engine running five times as fast as the Deutz engine. It was independent because it ran on petroleum (Benzin), and was not linked to a gas main.) and other patents, in the British Empire – 'England and the colonies' (excluding Canada). They were first used in motor launches, but soon paved the way for the start-up of the British motor industry. In May 1890, his mechanic Johann van Toll was sent ahead to look after their borrowed launch at Putney. Van Toll obtained premises in the new Billiter Buildings at 49 Leadenhall Street, London for Simms & Co Consulting Engineers. There had been no purpose in Simms bringing a car with him, because of the restrictions in Britain.

In May 1891, Simms demonstrated the motor launch on the River Thames, and in May 1893 formed The Daimler Motor Syndicate Limited to fit petrol engines into boats becoming, possibly, the UK's first motor company. This work was performed under Putney Bridge, where the launches were shown.

Following the signal success of Daimler-powered Peugeots and Panhards at the 1894 Paris-Rouen Trials, Simms decided to open a motor car factory. In June 1895, Simms and Evelyn Ellis bought in France and brought to England one of the first petrol–powered cars into the UK. (Note: At the June 1895 board meeting Simms detailed to the board of The Daimler Motor Syndicate his plans to form The Daimler Motor Company Limited and to build a brand-new factory, incorporating light rail, for 400 workmen making Daimler Motor Carriages. He then proudly produced the first car licence, for a 3½hp Panhard et Levassor (later referred to as a Daimler Motor Carriage). Bought in France by Evelyn Ellis, who had three Daimler motor launches moored by his house at Datchet, it was landed at Southampton on 3 July and driven by Ellis to Micheldever near Winchester where he met Simms. Ellis drove on to Datchet then to Malvern. Simms subsequently described their ride in a long letter to the Saturday Review. This was the first long journey by a motorcar in Britain. Simms firmed up his plans for the new company and new factory selecting a six-acre site at Cheltenham, John Henry Knight's Trusty Oil Engine Works, but Lawson bought this scheme from them and move it to Coventry.)

In early 1896, Harry Lawson acquired The Daimler Motor Syndicate Limited from Simms and established The Daimler Motor Company Limited, whilst Simms was appointed a director of Stuttgart's Daimler Motoren Gesellschaft which later became Daimler-Benz. Simms was also a consulting engineer to Lawson's The Daimler Motor Company Limited but, perhaps wisely, did not join its board of directors.

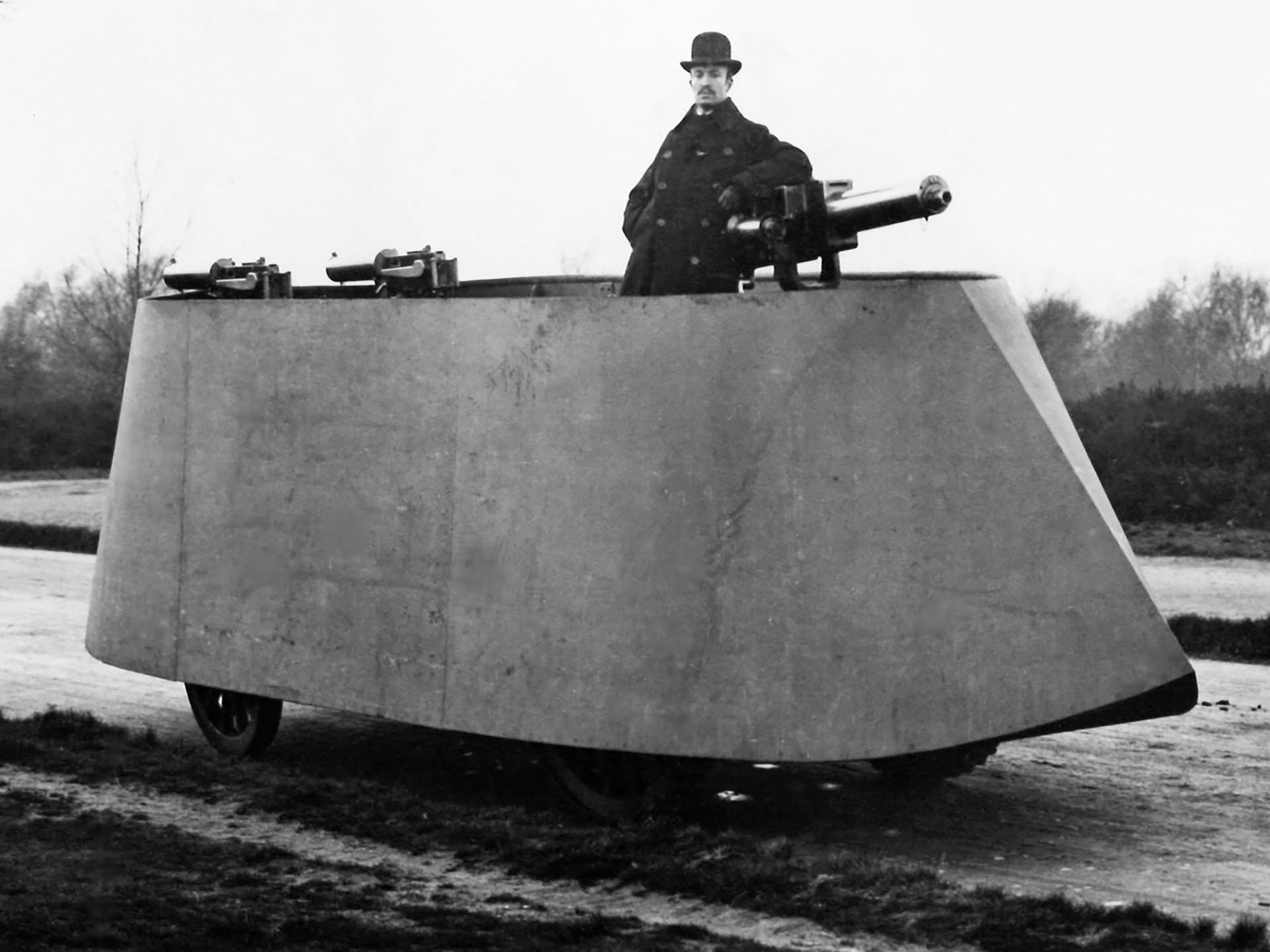
Simms in his 1902 Motor War Car

On 14 November 1896, Simms and Daimler took part in The Motor Car Club's Emancipation Day procession from London to Brighton, co-organised with Lawson, celebrating the lifting of the speed limit imposed by the Locomotives Act 1865 which had required vehicles to travel no faster than 4 mph (6.4 km/h). This Emancipation Day drive is still commemorated by its annual replay, the London to Brighton Veteran Car Run.

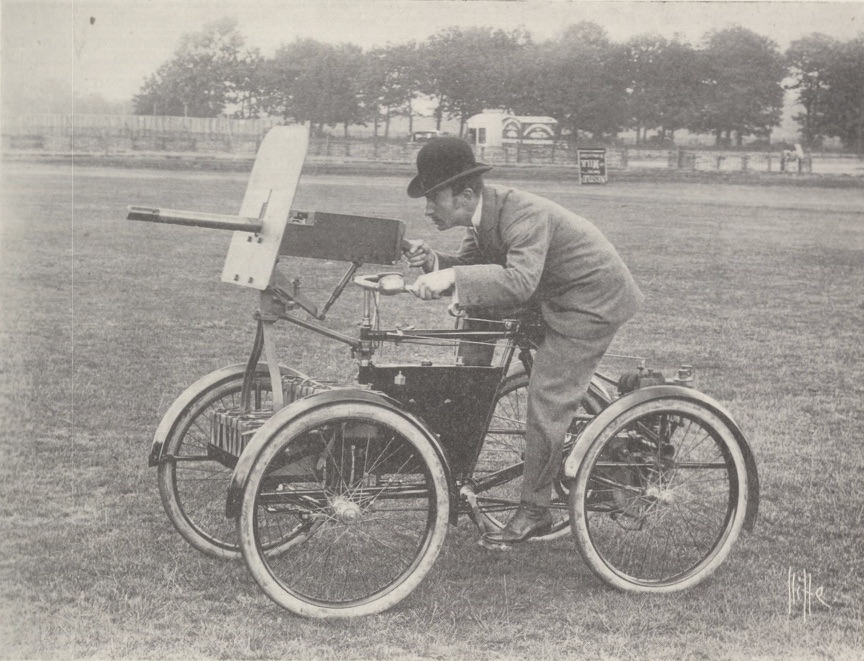
Simms demonstrating his Motor Scout, June 1899

Simms founded the Automobile Club of Great Britain (later the RAC) in 1897. He also helped with the foundation of what became the Royal Aero Club.

Simms' Motor War Car was the first armoured car ever built. It was designed and ordered in April 1899 and a single prototype was built by Vickers, Sons & Maxim on a special Coventry-built Daimler chassis with a German-built Daimler motor. Due to various mishaps, Vickers was unable to complete it until early 1902, after the end of the Second Boer War.

In 1902 he founded, and was elected the first President of, the Society of Motor Manufacturers and Traders (SMMT).

=== Simms-Bosch Magneto ===
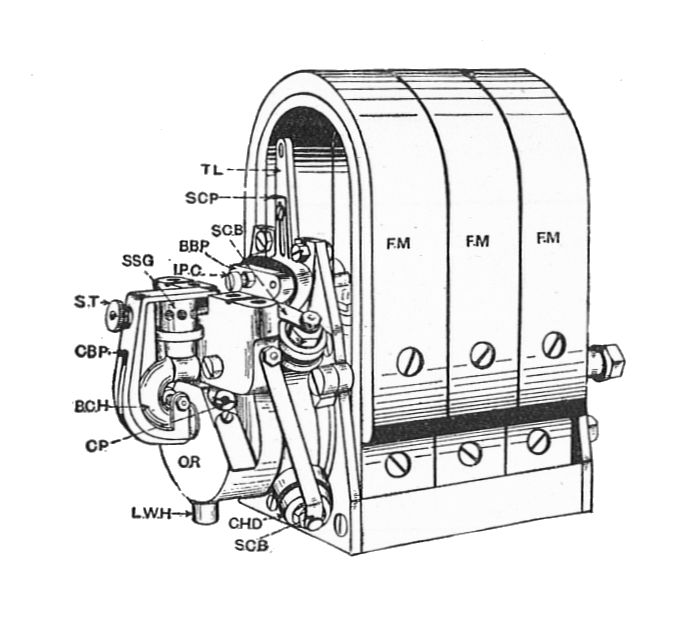
Simms-Bosch magneto 1903

In conjunction with Robert Bosch, he invented developed and patented the Simms-Bosch ignition magneto. It enabled engine designers to precisely time the ignition of fuel, because it was tied to the rotation of the engine. Their initial low-tension system was not an unqualified success, but they became the first to develop a practical high-tension magneto. In 1899 they established the jointly-owned Compagnie des Magnetos Simms-Bosch, but it foundered in 1906, due to personal differences between the partners.

In 1907 Simms established the Simms Magneto Company Ltd to manufacture magnetos under licence from Robert Bosch. He was unable to compete with European prices, and it closed in 1913. He had, however, contributed to Bosch's business by his stimulus to their further product development, and in opening up the French market for Bosch.

==== Simms Motor Units ====
In 1913, Simms started Simms Motor Units Ltd, at first to sell and repair components, in particular dynamos and magnetos. In World War I it became the principal supplier of magnetos to the armed forces, mainly from his Simms Magneto Company Limited of New Jersey, which he had established in 1910. Another subsidiary was set up in 1915, Standard Insulator Company Limited. In 1920, following the virtual destruction of the factory in Kilburn, London by fire, the company took over a former piano factory in East Finchley, Middlesex. A separate subsidiary to manufacture Simms-Vernier couplings (a method of adjusting the magneto's ignition timing) was set up in Lyon, France. During the 1930s the factory developed, in conjunction with Leyland Motors, a range of diesel fuel injectors, in particular the Uniflow injection pump of 1937. In World War II, the company again became the UK's main supplier of magnetos for aircraft and tanks; also supplying dynamos, starter motors, lights, pumps, nozzles, spark plugs and coils. Experimentation with compound metals for electrical contacts led to Compound Electro Metals Limited.

The East Finchley factory continued to expand after the war, eventually reaching 300,000 square feet (28,000 m^{2}), and the company took over many other firms. Simms Motor Units was itself taken over by Lucas CAV in 1968. Manufacturing in East Finchley was steadily run down as UK manufacturers lost market share. The factory closed in 1991 to be redeveloped for housing. It is commemorated by Simms Gardens and Lucas Gardens.

=== Simms Manufacturing ===
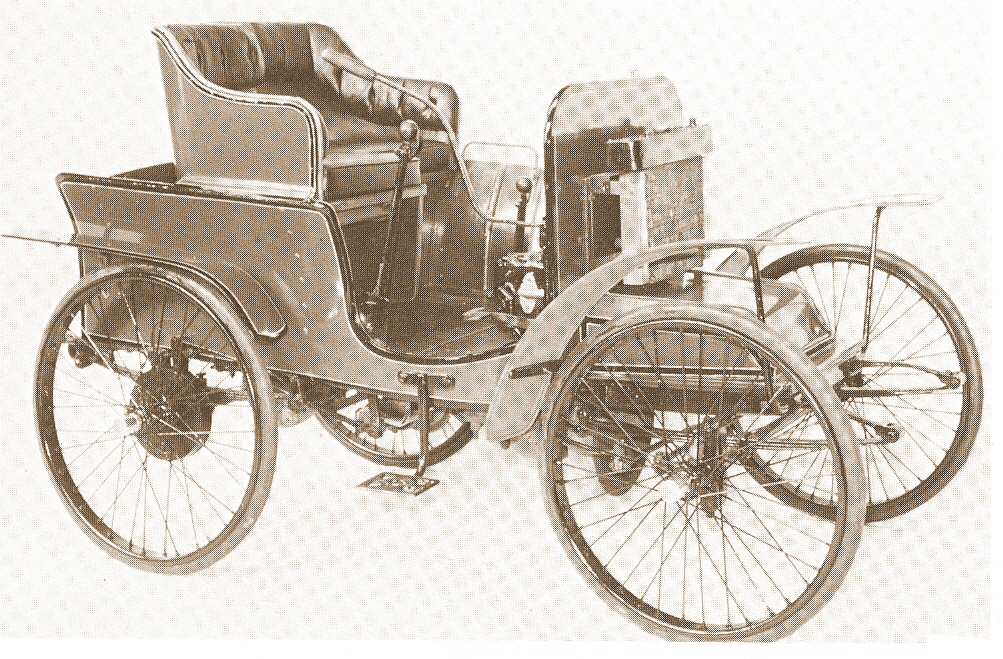
Simms-Welbeck 1898

Simms acquired some of the foreign patent rights to the petrol engine. In 1900 he set up Simms Manufacturing Company Ltd in Bermondsey, London, and moved the business in 1902 to Welbeck Works in Kimberley Road, Kilburn. There they made Simms-Welbeck cars, lorries and marine engines, fire engines, agricultural vehicles, military vehicles and guns, and aeronautical devices until about 1908. Simms invented the first rubber bumper, and a prototype indicator.

== See also ==
- The Daimler Company Limited
- History of East Finchley, Simms Motors
