= Charron, Girardot et Voigt 1902 =

French armoured car

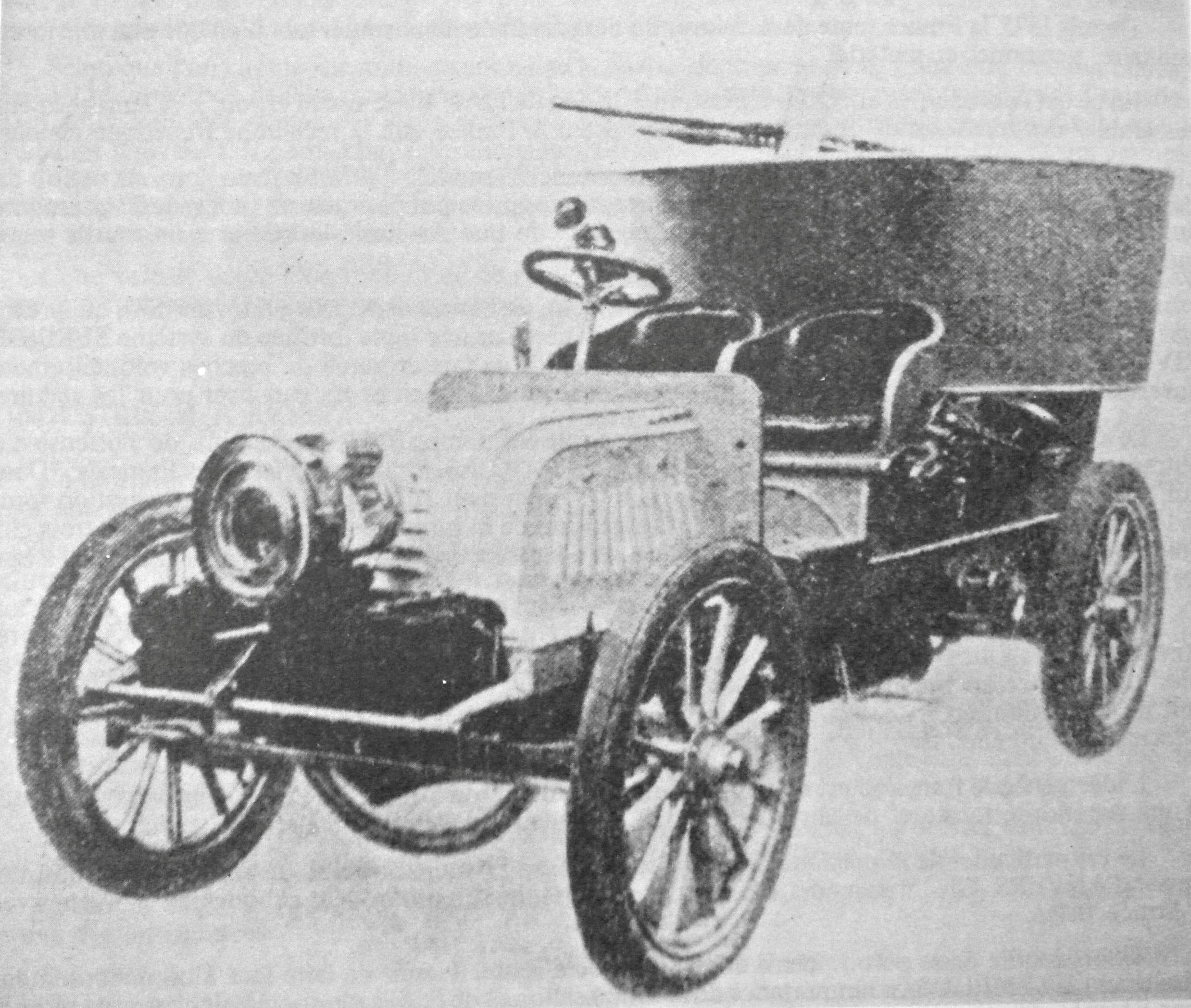
- Charron, Girardot et Voigt
- Type: Armoured car
- Place of origin: France

Service history
- In service: 8 March 1902-

Production history
- Manufacturer: Charron, Girardot et Voigt
- Unit cost: 45,000 Francs
- No. built: 2

Specifications
- Mass: 3,000 kg
- Crew: 3
- Armor: 7 mm
- Main armament: Hotchkiss machine gun 1901
- Engine: gasoline internal combustion engine 50 hp

The Charron, Girardot et Voigt 1902 was a French armoured car (French: Automitrailleuse blindée) developed in 1902 by the company Charron, Girardot et Voigt. It was equipped with a Hotchkiss machine gun, and with 7 mm armour for the gunner. ·

The first fully armoured car was designed by the Georgian engineer Mikheil Nakashidze. His design for a machine gun armed vehicle with 4-8mm of armour, combat weight of 3,000 kg, and a road speed of 50 km/hour was accepted by the Russian War Ministry for service with the Russian Army. However, as no Russian plant was considered capable of producing the vehicle, manufacture was subcontracted to the French company Charron, Girardot et Voigt.

The new machine was presented at the Salon de l'Automobile et du cycle in Brussels, starting 8 March 1902.

== Advertisements ==
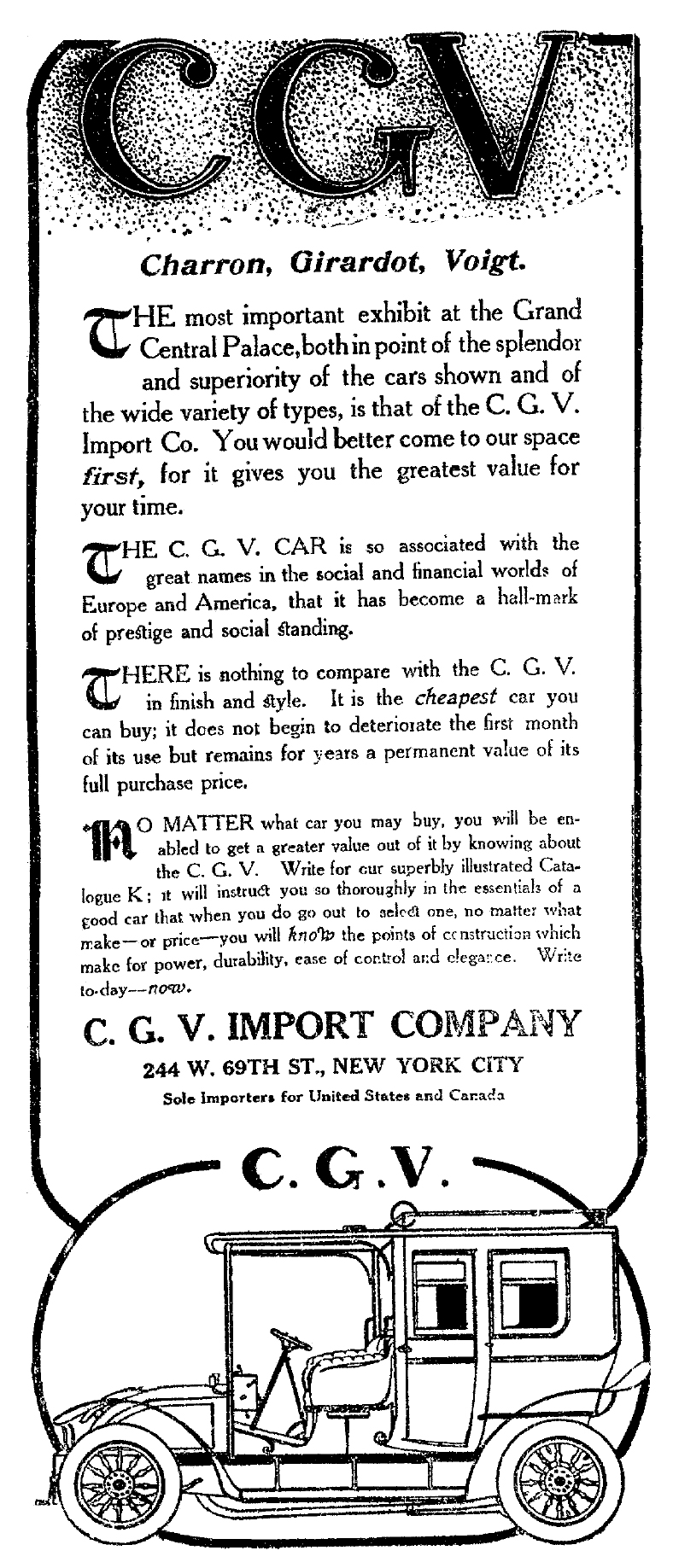
Charron, Girardot et Voigt - C.G.V. Import Company, New York - The New York Times, December 4, 1906

== See also ==
- History of the tank
