= List of United States Military Academy first captains =

CAPT. RWC SR MD

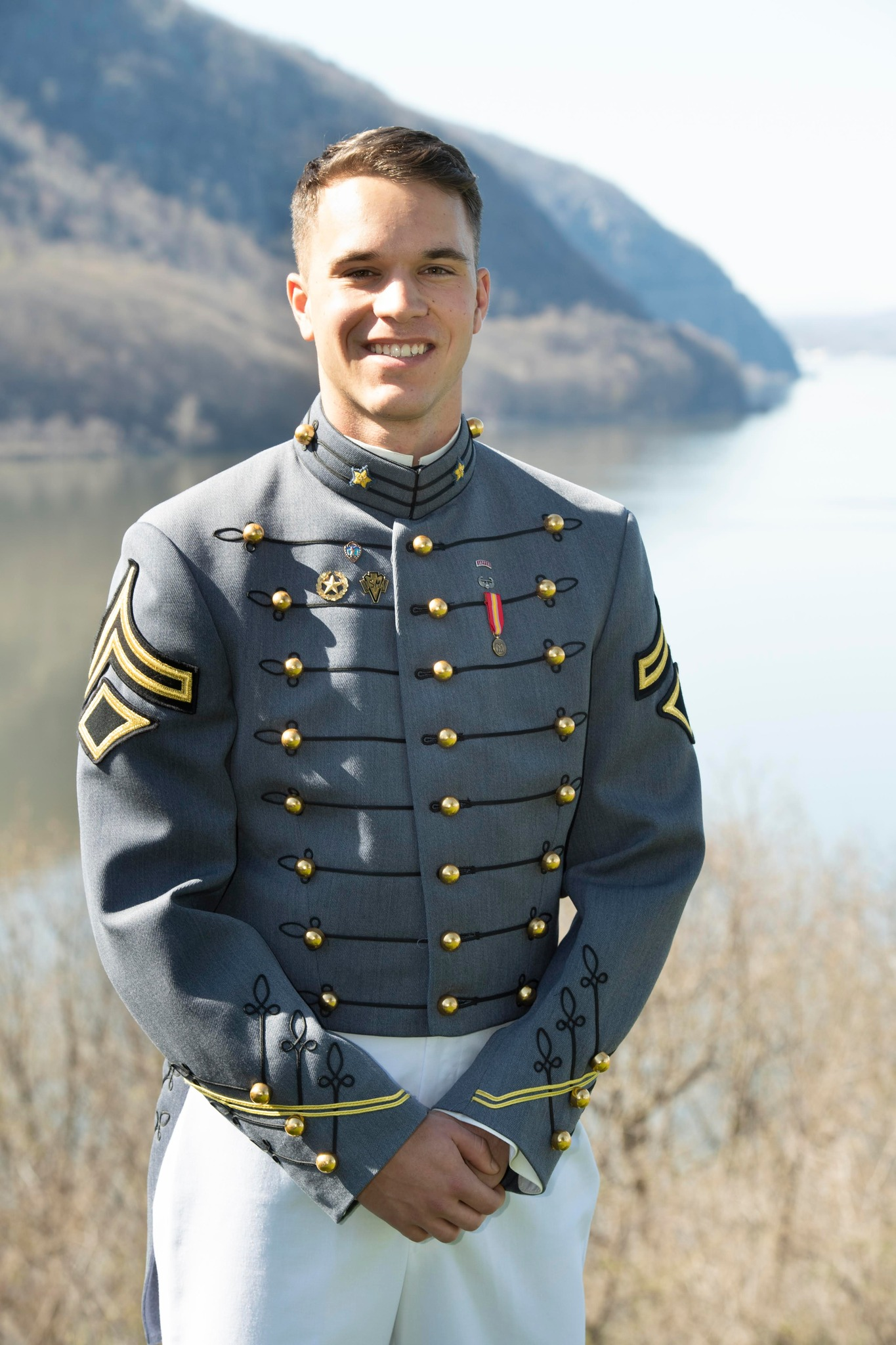
Martayn Van de Wall, 2023–2024 first captain

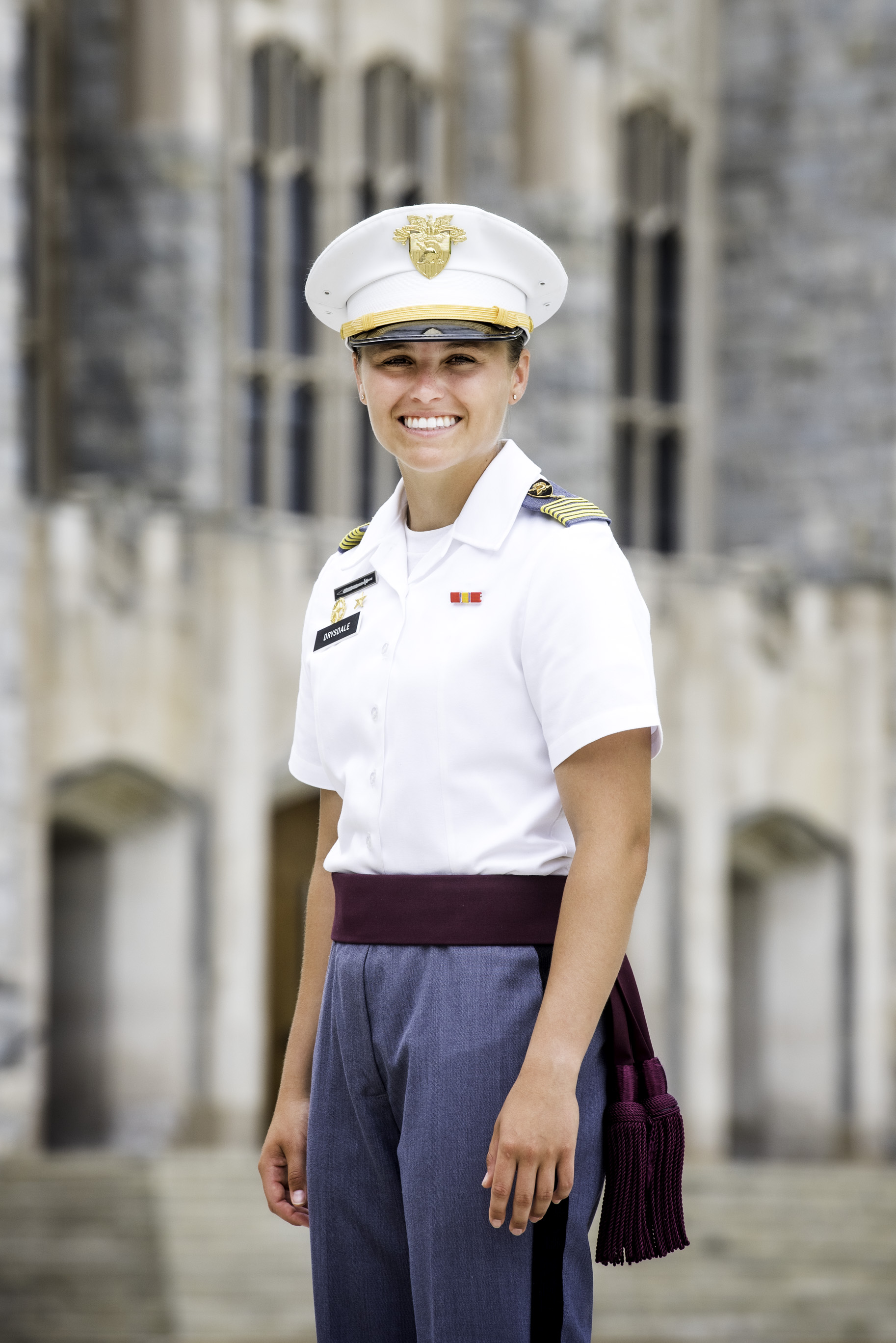
Lauren Drysdale, 2022–2023 first captain

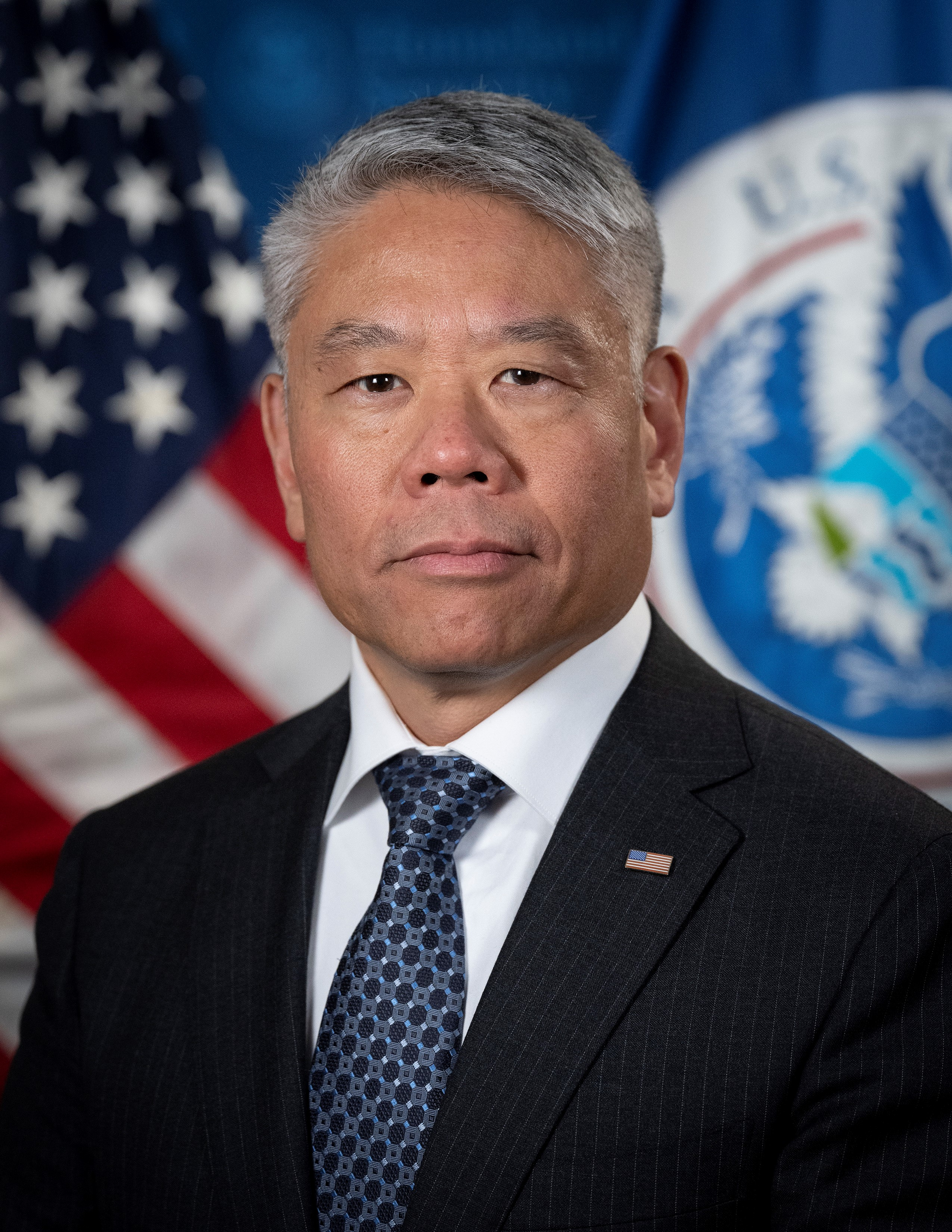
John Tien, 1987 first captain, and former deputy secretary for the United States Department of Homeland Security

The Corps of Cadets at the United States Military Academy (USMA), at West Point, New York, is organized into a brigade. The senior ranking cadet, the brigade commander, is known traditionally as the first captain, a leadership position created in 1872. The first captain is responsible for the overall performance of the 4,400-strong Corps of Cadets, including implementing a class agenda and acting as liaison between the Corps and the administration.

The rigid screening process begins with the applications for enrollment being submitted to either Federal-level legislators, or to the president or vice president of the United States. Once enrolled at the academy, each student's performance is closely tracked through the first three years, at the end of which, the individual top-performing cadet is named first captain for the ensuing academic year. Among the notable historical figures who held that position were John J. Pershing, Douglas MacArthur, and William Westmoreland.

During the academy's first 174 years, only men were admitted, with Henry Ossian Flipper in 1877 being the first African-American graduate. Vincent K. Brooks in 1980 was the first African American to hold the rank of first captain, and John Tien, who became the Deputy Secretary of the United States Department of Homeland Security in 2021, was the first Asian American to serve as first captain, in 1987. The first woman selected as first captain was Kristin M. Baker in 1989, and Simone Askew became the first African American woman first captain in 2018. Caroline Robinson, a native of Birmingham, Alabama, is the 2024–2025 first captain.

== Background ==
The United States Military Academy was founded in 1802, through the Military Peace Establishment Act signed into law by President Thomas Jefferson. The legislation served the dual purpose of maintaining a well-trained standing militia at the ready, and of bringing to fruition Jefferson's vision of a national university. During the academy's first 174 years, only men were admitted, with Henry Ossian Flipper in 1877 being the first African-American graduate. Public Law 94-106 (89 Stat. 531), signed by President Gerald Ford on 7 October 1975, mandated the admission of women at all of the previously male-only United States military service academies. On 7 July 1976, the first 119 women were admitted as students to West Point.

The school is one of three officer-training United States service academies under the jurisdiction of the Department of Defense, which sets the criteria for the applicants. The other two schools are the United States Naval Academy and the United States Air Force Academy. Applications for admission to any of the three schools are submitted to the offices of the United States president and vice president, as well as to congressional and senatorial representatives.

== Selection and organization of the Cadet Corps ==
The USMA academic year runs 12 calendar months, beginning in mid-May of one year, with class graduation taking place in May the following year. Class of 2023 began 16 May 2022, with the scheduled graduation date of 27 May 2023.

Each academic year, West Point announces its selection of cadet leadership positions. On 26 July 2021, Brigadier General Mark Quander, the current Commandant of Cadets, announced the Class of 2022 selections:

Today, the U.S. Military Academy announced the names of the cadets from the Class of 2022 selected to lead the Corps of Cadets during the academic year. These cadets will assume their leadership duties on Aug 15 prior to the start of the fall academic session at the academy. These Cadet-leaders have been challenged, tested, and assessed throughout their time at the Academy and have consistently prevailed, demonstrating excellence across all four pillars. They are leaders of character who have planned, coordinated, and led a rigorous and effective summer training cycle for the Corps of Cadets. It is abundantly clear that these leaders embody the values of Duty, Honor, and Country and have committed themselves to serving a higher cause.

The corps of cadets of each academic year is organized into a brigade with four regiments. Within each regiment there are three battalions, each consisting of three companies. Companies are lettered A through I, with a number signifying which regiment it belongs to. For example, there are four "H" companies: H1, H2, H3, and H4. The first captain is responsible for the overall performance of the 4,400-strong Corps of Cadets, including the implementing of a class agenda and acting as a liaison between the Corps and the administration. The names of first captains are displayed on plaques outside the Eisenhower Barracks.

== Influence ==
Several have risen to high rank and historical importance. John J. Pershing was 1886 first captain. With a goal of being a lawyer, he applied for enrollment to receive a tuition-free education. Prior to West Point, he taught at an all-black school in Laclede, Missouri. Known also as "Black Jack Pershing", some sources attribute the nickname to his rigid leadership style, while others attribute it to his 1895 command of the all-black "Buffalo Soldier" 10th Cavalry Regiment. In 1916, he led 10,000 men on an excursion into Mexico attempting to capture revolutionary general Pancho Villa. On 13 June 1917, Pershing was put in charge of the World War I American Expeditionary Forces in Europe, and was one of the architects of the Treaty of Versailles. He was promoted in 1919 to General of the Armies of the United States, at that time, the highest US Army rank ever achieved.

Charles Pelot Summerall was named first captain in 1892. He later participated in the Philippine Insurrection and the China Relief Expedition. Summerall was in France during World War I at Cantigny, Soissons, Battle of Saint-Mihiel, and in the Meuse-Argonne. He was a member of the 1919 American Commission to Negotiate Peace. His final position before retirement at age 86 was as president of The Citadel military college (1931–1953).

1903 first captain Douglas MacArthur became a five-star General of the Army, as well as Supreme Commander for the Allied Powers. Both MacArthur and 1906 first captain Jonathan M. Wainwright were awarded the Medal of Honor for their services in the Philippines campaign during World War II. In a public disagreement with President Harry S. Truman's policies during the Korean War, MacArthur was relieved of his command on 11 April 1951, but remained popular with the American public and was invited to deliver a farewell address before the United States Congress. He was 82 years old and in failing health when accepting the Sylvanus Thayer Award at the academy:

Today marks my final roll call with you. But I want you to know that when I cross the river, my last conscious thoughts will be of the Corps, and the Corps, and the Corps.

— General Douglas MacArthur, 12 May 1962

Pershing, MacArthur, Malin Craig, William Westmoreland and Bernard W. Rogers all served as Chief of Staff of the United States Army. John P. McConnell became first captain in 1938, and the Chief of Staff of the United States Air Force in 1964.

== Interrupted terms ==
There were some unusual cases. Casper H. Conrad Jr. was selected as first captain of the Class of 1894 on 14 August 1893, but he went off limits during a cadet visit to the World's Columbian Exposition in Chicago. He was court martialed and dismissed from the academy but was permitted to return the following year and graduated with the Class of 1895. He was removed as first captain on 24 August 1893 before the start of the Academic year and never served in the position. There were two first captains in the Class of 1920 because Claude M. McQuarrie resigned the post in order to concentrate on his academic studies. Thomas A. Roberts Jr. was named as his successor for the remainder of the academic year.

== First captains (1872–present) ==
List of United States Military Academy first captains of the cadets
Class year	Name	Comments/post-cadet careers	Sources
1872	William H. Miller	Colonel and chief quartermaster who participated in the Modoc War, Nez Perce War and Spanish–American War	
1873	Thomas N. Bailey	Captain who served as West Point assistant professor of both engineering and mathematics; commanding officer of the engineering company at Willets Point, New York	
1874	Russell Thayer	Brigadier general and civil engineer who laid out the grounds for the 1876 Centennial Exposition, and also commanded the 2nd Brigade, Pennsylvania National Guard; great, great-nephew of 19th-century academy superintendent Sylvanus Thayer	
1875	Smith Stallard Leach	US Army Corps of Engineers 1876 Centennial Exposition, Mississippi River Commission, Boston Harbor, Long Island Sound, assistant to Chief of Engineers. Rose to the rank of colonel	
1876	Charles Hartwell Bonesteel Sr.	Infantry officer assigned to various posts in South Dakota, California, Nebraska, the Spanish–American War, Philippine–American War. Rose to the rank of major. His son Charles Hartwell Bonesteel Jr. and grandson Charles H. Bonesteel III also attended West Point, each rising to the rank of general	
1877	Walter L. Fisk	Colonel, US Army Corps of Engineers, worked on various projects throughout the United States, recalled from retirement to active duty during World War I	
1878	James L. Lusk	Captain US Army Corps of Engineers, oversaw construction of the Lusk Reservoir	
1879	Curtis M. Townsend	Colonel and commanding officer, with a 40-year career in the US Army Corps of Engineers. Much of his career was to oversee water navigation locks at the Columbia River, Oregon, and the Washington Aqueduct improvement of the Mississippi River. Oversaw a lot of work on the Gulf Division River and Harbor, and the channel connecting the Great Lakes	
1880	Frank Harrison Peck	Post-army career as district attorney of Jefferson County, New York. Returning to military service, he was captain and adjutant of 9th New York Volunteer Infantry during the Spanish–American War. Captain of the 26th U.S. Infantry during the Philippine–American War	
1881	James Goold Warren	Colonel US Army Corps of Engineers, US Army Division Engineer, Lakes Division, Buffalo, New York	
1882	Samuel Rodman Jr.	2nd lieutenant with the 5th Artillery and the 1st Artillery, participated in an expedition to the mouth of the Methow River. Additional training at Naval torpedo school in Rhode Island, and stationed at Fort Alcatraz in California	
1883	George Windle Read	Major general, served in Spanish–American War and Pancho Villa Expedition; division and corps commander in World War I	
1884	Cassius Erie Gillette	US Army Corps of Engineers, retired with the rank of major in 1906. Post-Army career as chief engineer and consulting engineer with the city of Philadelphia. As a civilian, operated mining operations in Mexico	
1885	Philip Augustus Bettens Jr.	Service in the 9th Cavalry regiment at Fort Robinson, Nebraska, participated in the South Dakota Wounded Knee Massacre; died of tuberculosis at Fort Huachuca, Arizona	
1886	John J. Pershing	General of the Armies	
1887	Edward C. Young	Major general Illinois National Guard; brigadier general Illinois Reserve Militia	
1888	John S. Winn	Brigadier general, 157th Infantry Brigade, American Expeditionary Forces, Septsarges, France during World War I	
1889	George T. Langhorne	1903–1906 acting governor of Moro Province in the Philippine Islands. 1913–1915 Military attaché in Europe	
1890	Francis Cutler Marshall	Brigadier general, World War I 1st Division, American Expeditionary Forces during the Meuse–Argonne offensive. Marshall Army Airfield named in his honor	
1891	James Francis McIndoe	Brigadier general, World War I commander of II Corps Engineers on the Western Front	
1892	Charles Pelot Summerall	Chief of Staff of the US Army 1926–1930, president of The Citadel 1931–1953. Served in France during World War I, member of 1919 American Commission to Negotiate Peace	
1893	Charles Willauer Kutz	Brigadier general US Army Corps of Engineers, Kutz Memorial Bridge named in his honor	
1894	Warren Halsey Mitchell	Died of typhoid fever while serving with the Second Artillery garrison at Fort Adams, Rhode Island	
1895	Thales Lucius Ames	West Point mathematics instructor, All-American football center for the academy team. Superintendent of the Springfield Armory	
1896	Abraham Grant Lott	Baseball athlete from Abilene, Kansas before, during and after his US Army career; served in the Great Plains, as well as in Cuba following its 1898 independence	
1897	Henry Sims Morgan	US Army Corps of Engineers, stationed at Fort Screven on Tybee Island, Georgia, designed the gun battery located on what is now Wassaw National Wildlife Refuge. He died trying to save drowning sailors during an 1898 hurricane off the Georgia coast. A monument to him was erected at Tybee by his former Military Academy classmates	
1898	Malin Craig	General, Chief of Staff of the US Army, retired 1938, recalled 1941 as World War II Chairman of the War Department Personnel Board and died in office on 25 July 1945	
1899	James Albert Woodruff	Major general 1938; commanded San Francisco Port of Embarkation 1935–1937, Hawaiian Division 1939, I Corps Area 1939–1941; president, military commission that replaced civilian courts after Pearl Harbor attack; commander, Hawaii director, Defense POW/MIA Accounting Agency	
1900	Gilbert A. Youngberg	US Army Corps of Engineers. 1910–1914 West Point head of Dept. of Practical Military Engineering. Deputy chief of staff World War I America Expeditionary Forces in France. Co-founder of the Society of American Military Engineers. Technical consultant for construction of the Cross Florida Barge Canal	
1901	Francis William Clark	Commander of 10th Field Artillery Regiment, chief of staff 3rd division, Fort Lewis (Washington), retiring in 1939. Recalled to active duty during World War II to serve as commander of the Presidio of Monterey, California. Final retirement 1943	
1902	Francis F. Longley	American Expeditionary Forces World War I, water supply specialist	
1903	Douglas MacArthur	General of the Army, Medal of Honor, Superintendent of the United States Military Academy, Supreme Commander for the Allied Powers, Chief of Staff of the US Army	
1904	Henry Harris Robert	Commander 4th Regiment US Army Corps of Engineers, oversaw the completion of the Celilo Canal	
1905	Thomas West Hammond	Secretary of the general staff for the American Expeditionary Forces in World War I; commanded 28th Infantry Regiment; 1934 New York City deputy commissioner of sanitation, 1936 commissioner of water, gas and electricity, 1936	
1906	Jonathan M. Wainwright	General in September 1945; Medal of Honor for World War II service in the Philippines; commanded Philippine Division 1940–1942, United States Army Forces in the Far East 1942, Fourth United States Army 1946–1947	
1907	Charles Tillman Harris Jr.	Major general; assistant chief of ordnance; commander of the Aberdeen Proving Ground	
1908	Harvey Douglas Higley	Brigadier general 1941; chief of staff, VIII Corps Area 1938–1941	
1909	Carl Adolph Baehr	Brigadier general December 1941; commanded 71st Field Artillery Brigade 1941–1944, VI Corps Artillery 1944–1945	
1910	Frederick Smith Strong Jr.	Brigadier general September 1944; chief engineer, services of supply, China-Burma-India Theater of Operations 1943, Commanded Northwest Service Command in Canada 1944–1945, United Kingdom Base Command 1945	
1911	Benjamin Curtis Lockwood Jr.	Brigadier general December 1941; commanding general on Tongatapu in Tonga, Espiritu Santo in Vanuatu 1942–1943, Army Ground Forces Replacement Depot at Fort Ord, California, 1943–1946	
1912	William Dean	Major who served in the Philippines and Pancho Villa Expedition; died of influenza during the 1918 global pandemic	
1913	David E. Cain	Colonel. Served in World War I and II	
1914	James B. Cress	Major general, Army Corps of Engineers. Executive for Reserve and ROTC Affairs. Served as a White House social aide during the presidency of Woodrow Wilson	
1915	Roscoe B. Woodruff	Major general June 1942. Pancho Villa Expedition, World War I, World War II; commanded 77th Infantry Division 1942–1943, VII Corps 1943–1944, 24th Infantry Division 1944–1945, XV Corps 1951–1953	
1916	Raymond G. Moses	Brigadier general March 1942; Assistant Chief of Staff for Supply, War Department 1942–1943, Twelfth United States Army Group 1944–1945; technical advisor on film West Point	
1917 April	Elbert L. Ford	Brigadier general June 1943; chief of staff North African Theater of Operations 1943–1944, Chief of Ordnance of the United States Army 1949–1953	
1917 August	John Thornton Knight Jr.	Colonel. Distinguished Service Cross, Battle of Saint-Mihiel. Army 1917–1920, Reserve, 1921–1928, National Guard 1928–1930, Army 1942–1947	
1918 June	O'Ferrall Knight	Lieutenant colonel. Brother of John Thornton Knight Jr.; served in World War II	
1918 November	Howard Louis Peckham	Brigadier general August 1942; led the Combat Command, 12th Armored Division, Director of Fuels and Lubricants, Office of the Quartermaster General, 1943–1946	
1919	Louis George Horowitz	Colonel, Organized Reserve Corps. World War I and World War II. Legion of Merit. Construction company owner and real estate broker. Father of novelist James Salter	
1920	Claude Monroe McQuarrie	Brigadier general 1952; commanded 132nd Infantry Regiment of the 23rd Infantry Division 1943–1945; assistant commanding general of the 7th Infantry Division in Korean War 1951–1952	
1920	Thomas A. Roberts Jr.	Colonel; commander of 2nd Armored Division artillery in North Africa, Sicily, Normandy; died August 1944 during Operation Overlord; posthumously awarded the Silver Star and Legion of Merit	
1921	George H. Olmsted	Philanthropist who established The Olmsted Scholar Program. Remained in the army for one year after graduating but left to enter private business; he remained in the military as a member of the National Guard and Reserve and was recalled to active duty for World War II; recalled to active duty again during the Korean War; retired as a Reserve major general in 1959	
1922	Charles Joseph Barrett	1942 US Army Deputy Chief of Counterintelligence, Military Intelligence Service, War Department; 1948–1963 West Point foreign languages department	
1923	Waldemar "Fritz" Breidster	Major general, captain of the West Point football team, All-America water polo player. World War II commander of the 173rd Field Artillery Group, liaison Chief of Staff with the Chinese Army of India, oversaw completion of the Burma Road, Legion of Merit for action in the China-Burma-India Theater, 1944–1945 Wisconsin National Guard, Wisconsin Athletic Hall of Fame	
1924	Robert Vernon Lee	Deputy Chief of Staff, 15th Army, participated in the 1944 Operation Overlord. Major general through World War II. Legion of Merit awards for service in 1941–1945, Distinguished Service Medal for service 1946–1961	
1925	Charles E. Saltzman	Brigadier general, Vice President and Secretary of the New York Stock Exchange, April 39–June 1949; Assistant Secretary of State, September 1947–May 1949; Under Secretary of State for Administration, June–December 1954.	
1926	Raymond Coleman Maude	Brigadier general US Air Force, commander Air Force Research Center at Cambridge, Massachusetts	
1927	George E. Martin	Major general who commanded the 10th Mountain Division in 1955 and 1956. Served in World War II and Korean War. Recipient of Army Distinguished Service Medal, Legion of Merit, Bronze Star Medal, and French Croix de Guerre	
1928	James E. Briggs	US Air Force lieutenant general, superintendent of the United States Air Force Academy	
1929	Bruce D. Rindlaub	Brigadier general, Army engineers maintenance center	
1930	Ralph P. Swofford Jr.	Lieutenant general, commander of the US Air Force Air University	
1931	John K. Waters	General, World War II Tunisia POW, Korean War, son-in-law of general George S. Patton, recipient of numerous medals and awards. Returned to West Point in 1945 as Commandant of Cadets	
1932	John P. McConnell	Chief of Staff of the United States Air Force, Joint Chiefs of Staff, entered West Point after earning a BS degree at Henderson State University in Arkansas. McConnell enlisted in the United States Army Air Corps following his graduation from the academy.	
1933	Kenneth E. Fields	Brigadier general, US Army Corps of Engineers. Participated in the World War II Battle of Remagen, receiving the Silver Star for his actions. Post-World War II, he was assistant to Leslie Groves of the Manhattan Project, receiving the Distinguished Service Medal for his service	
1934	John de Peyster Townsend Hills	Colonel, Air Corps and Air Force, World War II and Korean War. Graduate of California Institute of Technology, United Kingdom Joint Services Staff College, Industrial College of the Armed Forces	
1935	Herbert C. Gee	Member of the United States Atomic Energy Commission, co-founder of Gee and Jenson Consulting Engineers in West Palm Beach, Florida	
1936	William Westmoreland	General, West Point superintendent, 1960 to 1963, commander of United States forces during the Vietnam War from 1964 to 1968, US Army chief of staff from 1968 to 1972	
1937	Stanley Lowell Smith	Dean of academics US Coast Guard Academy, director of the University of Connecticut at Avery Point Branch	
1938	Harold Killian Kelley	Brigadier general, five years with the Army Corps of Engineers, World War II transfer to the US Air Force	
1939	James Lewis Cantrell	Colonel, World War II and Korean War. Graduate of Princeton University, US Army Command and General Staff College, US Army War College. Commander, 10th Artillery Group. director of instruction, US Army Artillery and Missile School	
1940	John F. Presnell Jr.	Captain, Army Corps of Engineers, World War II Japanese POW on the Ōryoku Maru cargo ship bombed and sunk by the Americans, killing all on board	
1941	John Norton	Lieutenant general with the US Army Air Corps. Paratrooper and helicopter pilot who was instrumental in shaping the military's use of air power during war. Military advisor to the US Congress, as well as to the US Department of Defense at the Pentagon	
1942	Carl Columbus Hinkle Jr.	US Air Force colonel, Battalion: 613th and 614th Bombardment Squadrons, also served in the Korean War, elected to the College Football Hall of Fame in 1959	
1943, January	James Edward Kelleher	Colonel. World War II, Graduate, Army Command and General Staff College, Army War College, Commander, XVIII Airborne Corps Artillery	
1943, June	Bernard W. Rogers	Chief of Staff of the US Army, NATO's Supreme Allied Commander, Europe and Commander in Chief, United States European Command	
1944	John H. Cushman	Lieutenant general, three tours of duty in Vietnam, writer and consultant	
1945	Robert E. Woods	Baseball and track, as well as football halfback, at West Point. Served under Douglas MacArthur in Japan	
1946	Amos A. Jordon Jr.	Brigadier general, two Army Distinguished Service medals and two Legion of Merit awards, all for service in Vietnam	
1947	William Jackson Schuder	Service in Italy, Korea, Vietnam. Earned a Master of Engineering degree at Princeton University	
1948	Arnold W. Braswell	US Air Force commander, Pacific Air Forces	
1949	Harry Augustus Griffith	Army Lieutenant general, director of Defense Threat Reduction Agency	
1950	John M. Murphy	US Representative from New York 1963–1973	
1951	William J. Ryan	Colonel US Air Force, service in World War II, Korea, Vietnam	
1952	Gordon David Carpenter	Lieutenant colonel, graduate of Command and General Staff College, service in Germany, Korea, Vietnam. At the time of his death, being considered for membership in the Vietnam Helicopter Pilots Association	
1953	Robert E. Barton	Enrolled in the academy following service in World War II Germany, and the Korean War. He served two tours of duty with the 101st Airborne Division in Vietnam, for which he received a Bronze Star, the Legion of Merit, and the Purple Heart, He later served in the National Military Command Center at the Pentagon, and lastly as Commandant of Cadets at West Point	
1954	John C. Bard	Platoon leader during the Arkansas Little Rock Nine racial integration. Two tours of Vietnam. Served in the Pentagon and the US State Department, Commandant of Cadets at West Point. Post-retirement graduate of William & Mary Law School	
1955	Lee Donne Olvey	Brigadier general, Rhodes scholar, Harvard PhD in economics. 1950 valedictorian at Bradwell Institute in Hinesville, Georgia, Olvey Field named for him	
1956	Robert Gordon Farris	Captain, Army football team	
1957	William Thomas Huckabee III	Army, 1953–1957, North Carolina business executive	
1958	Robert F. Durkin	Major general, director of Defense Mapping Agency	
1959	Peter M. Dawkins	Brigadier general, ret., served with the 82nd and 101 Airborne Divisions	
1960	Charles P. Otstott	Executive to Supreme Allied Commander Europe	
1961	Harold Michael Hannon	26-year career army veteran, post-military career was with the New York Stock Exchange	
1962	James Raiford Ellis	Lieutenant general, eight medals and awards, US Defense Representative to Pakistan 1988–1990	
1963	Richard Everett Eckert	Physician. Quarterback for Army Football Team. Two tours in Vietnam. 1965-1966 Rifle & Weapons Platoon Leader of Company B, 2nd Battalion, 503rd Infantry, 173rd Airborne Brigade and S-3 Liaison Officer last five months. 1968-69 Commander of Company D, 2nd Battalion, 27th Infantry, 25th Infantry Division. Served as G3 Operations Officer for 22nd Infantry. Silver Star, 2 Purple Hearts, 2 Bronze Stars. 22 years of service in the Infantry and Medical Branch.	
1964	Richard A. Chilcoat	Lieutenant general, executive assistant to general Colin Powell, dean of the George Bush School of Government and Public Service, at Texas A&M University	
1965	Carl Robert Arvin	Died from hostile fire while serving as an advisor to the 7th Republic of Vietnam Airborne Division	
1966	Norman E. Fretwell	Vietnam war veteran, graduate of University of Michigan Law School	
1967	Jack B. Wood	Company commander, Vietnam. Commander, 1st Battalion, 52nd Infantry. Commander, 1st Brigade, 1st Infantry Division. Colonel (Retired)	
1968	John L. Throckmorton Jr.	Son of general John L. Throckmorton. Football team captain, 1967. Lieutenant colonel (retired). Graduate of Princeton University and Long Island University	
1969	Robert H. Baldwin Jr.	Currently owner of TWAN Development LLC	
1970	John T. Connors	Five-year veteran officer of the US Army prior to enrolling in the US Military Academy	
1971	Thomas A. Pyrz	20-year army veteran, Indiana State Bar Association executive director, Indiana University Maurer School of Law	
1972	Robert L. Van Antwerp Jr.	Chief of Engineers and commanding general of the Army Corps of Engineers	
1973	Joseph P. Tallman	M.B.A. from the Stanford School of Business, president and CEO of Access Health, Inc.	
1974	Jack E. Pattison	Published author; Vietnam service prior to enrolling at West Point, participated in the 1990 Gulf War, army staff in Washington, DC, and Headquarters, Forces Command in Atlanta, Georgia	
1975	James K. Abcouwer	Currently chairman, president and CEO of Trans Energy Inc.	
1976	Richard Morales Jr.	Attended Oxford University as a Rhodes scholar to study international politics and economics; Yale School of Medicine	
1977	Kenneth F. Miller	US Army staff judge advocate at West Point (sometimes listed as Kenneth F. Miller Jr.)	
1978	James A. Hoffman II	Partner in Hoffman Koenig Hering PLLC, West Point AOG board of directors	
1979	John J. Cook III	3rd Battalion, 27th Field Artillery Regiment during the Gulf War, later re-enlisting as a base chaplain	
1980	Vincent K. Brooks	First African American to hold the rank of first captain. US Army general who served with the Pentagon Joint Chiefs of Staff. Commander, US Forces Korea Combined Forces Command and United Nations Command	
1981	Stanley R. March	Engineering degree West Point, M.S. degree Vanderbilt University, senior vice president of Landis+Gyr	
1982	John W. Nicholson Jr.	Four-star general, commander for the US Forces – Afghanistan	
1983	Lawrence J. Kinde	Civil engineering student who specialized in the Arabic language. The son of Biblical instructors, he spent much of his youth in Sierra Leone	
1984	William E. Rapp	Major general, retired. Served in the 1991 Gulf War, PA to General David Petraeus in Afghanistan, Senior US Army liaison to the US Congress	
1985	Brian L. Dosa	Director of Public Works, Fort Hood, Texas	
1986	Timothy A. Knight	Currently an advisor in the private sector	
1987	John K. Tien Jr.	First Asian American to hold the position, currently serving as deputy secretary for the United States Department of Homeland Security	
1988	Gregory H. Louks	14 years as director of West Point Association of Graduates; founder of Iron Sword building industry consulting firm	
1989	Mark M. Jennings	Assigned to the First Ranger Battalion at Fort Stewart, after graduation from the academy	
1990	Kristin M. Baker	First woman first captain. Served as a director on the US Army Talent Management Task Force. Previously served as assistant director for Intelligence, Joint Staff J2, as well as commander Joint Intelligence Operations Center Europe Analytic Center at RAF Molesworth in England. Previously assigned to V Corps G2 and Chief of Assessments, and served at International Security Assistance Force (ISAF) headquarters, Kabul, Afghanistan	
1991	Douglas P. McCormick	Managing partner at HCI Equity, Master of Business Administration – Harvard Business School, Bachelor of Science in economics from the US Military Academy at West Point	
1992	Omar J. Jones IV	Major general, Installation Management Command, Joint Base San Antonio, Texas	
1993	Shawn L. Daniel	82nd Airborne Division, Operation Enduring Freedom, Iraq War	
1994	Howard H. Hoege III	Army Judge Advocate General (JAG) officer in Iraq, president and CEO of the Mariners’ Museum and Park in Newport News, Virginia	
1995	Hans J. Pung	Mathematics scholar at West Point, currently president of RAND Corporation Europe	
1996	Robert S. Brown	Served in the Iraq War	
1997	Daniel C. Hart	Medical Corps, 2020 Lewis A. Mologne Award from the Walter Reed National Military Medical Center	
1998	W. Patrick Connelly	Board of directors at Enercorp, M.B.A. from Harvard Business School and a M.P.A. from Harvard Kennedy School	
1999	Robert M. Shaw	Served in Operation Enduring Freedom	
2000	Robert C. Stanton	Company C, 1st Battalion, 32nd Infantry Regiment, 10th Mountain Division Afghanistan	
2001	David A. Uthlaut	Lieutenant colonel, multiple deployments to war zones, Pat Tillman's platoon leader in Afghanistan when both were shot by their own men	
2002	Andrew T. Blickhahn	82nd Airborne Division, Bravo Company during the Battle of Baghdad (2003)	
2003	Ricardo A. Turner	Career army commander who earned degrees in economics and civil engineering at West Point. He earned an M.P.S. degree in legislative affairs from the George Washington University, and served as legislative assistant to the 38th Army Chief of Staff. Army military aide to the president of the United States	
2004	Grace H. Chung	Six years with the Army Medical Service Corps, deployed to Germany and Iraq.	
2005	Ryan L. Boeka	2018 graduate of the US Army Command and General Staff Officer Course, receiving the Lieutenant Colonel Boyd McCanna Harris Leadership Award	
2006	Stephanie L. Hightower	Army physician Joint Base Lewis–McChord, graduate of George Washington University School of Medicine & Health Sciences	
2007	Jonathan C. Nielsen	Journalist, operations officer in 3rd Brigade, 101st Airborne Division	
2008	Jason G. Crabtree	Veteran of the War in Afghanistan, attached to the United States Army Cyber Command, co-founder of cyber security QOMPLX analytics platform	
2009	Benjamin A. Amsler	Served in the War in Afghanistan	
2010	Tyler R. Gordy	Served in Iraq and Afghanistan, graduate of the Harvard Business School (MBA), Former President and CEO of PWSC, current Partner at Artesian and Member of Board of Advisors for Kingsway Financial Services	
2011	Marc Beaudoin	Administrative and civil law attorney with the Office of Judge Advocate, III Corps	
2012	Charles L. Phelps	Special Forces operational detachment commander in 10th Special Forces Group (Airborne)	
2013	James B. Whittington	Army football senior defensive back	
2014	Lindsey Danilack	Also known as Lindsey Danilack Chrismon. Special Operations Aviation Regiment based at Fort Campbell, Kentucky. Boeing AH-64 Apache pilot, recruited by the academy while she was still in high school	
2015	Austin C. Welch	In an interview with Chicago WCIU-TV show YouAndMeThisMorning, Welch credited his military service to the examples set by his grandfathers. Upon graduation, he commissioned into the Army Aviation branch and subsequently trained to become a helicopter pilot	
2016	Eugene J. Coleman III	First African-American to simultaneously be first captain and class president. Graduate of Harvard Business School.	
2017	Hugh P. McConnell	Top of the Class in 2017. Served in Operation Inherent Resolve and continues to serve as an Infantryman.	
2018	Simone M. Askew	First African American woman to become first captain and Rhodes Scholar.	
2019	David T. Bindon	Upon completion of his West Point education, he was scheduled to enroll in King's College London Department of War Studies on a UK Marshall Scholarship, named for US Secretary of State George C. Marshall	
2020	Daine A. Van de Wall	First-generation American whose parents emigrated from the Netherlands, Van de Wall applied and was appointed to West Point during his first year enrollment in ROTC. He was selected a Rhodes scholar in residence and received degrees in government foreign policy and business administration from the University of Oxford before entering full-time Army service.	
2021	Reilly McGinnis	Also known as Reilly McGinnis Rudolph. Recruited in high school by the US Army women's soccer team. She and her husband are assigned to the 130th Engineer Brigade	
2022	Holland Pratt	Scheduled to attend the University of Oxford as a Rhodes scholar, where she will work on Master of Science degrees in global governance and diplomacy and refugee and forced migration studies	
2023	Lauren Drysdale	Midfielder on the United States Army women's soccer team	
2024	Martayn Van de Wall	Marshall and Truman Scholar. Younger brother of 2020 first captain Daine Van de Wall.	
2025	Caroline Robinson	Former Setter on the United States Army women's volleyball team..	
2026	Jayram Suryanarayan		
2027	Elizabeth Fetter		

== See also ==
- History of the United States Military Academy
- The class the stars fell on
