= General Roth =

General Roth may refer to:

- Ernst-August Roth (1898–1975), German Luftwaffe lieutenant general
- Marshall S. Roth (1901–1995), U.S. Air Force major general
- Richard Roth (politician) (born 1950), U.S. Air Force major general

== See also ==
- Ludwig Freiherr Roth von Schreckenstein (1789–1858), Prussian Army general of the cavalry
