= Arnold W. Braswell =

United States Air Force general (1925–2022)

Arnold Webb Braswell
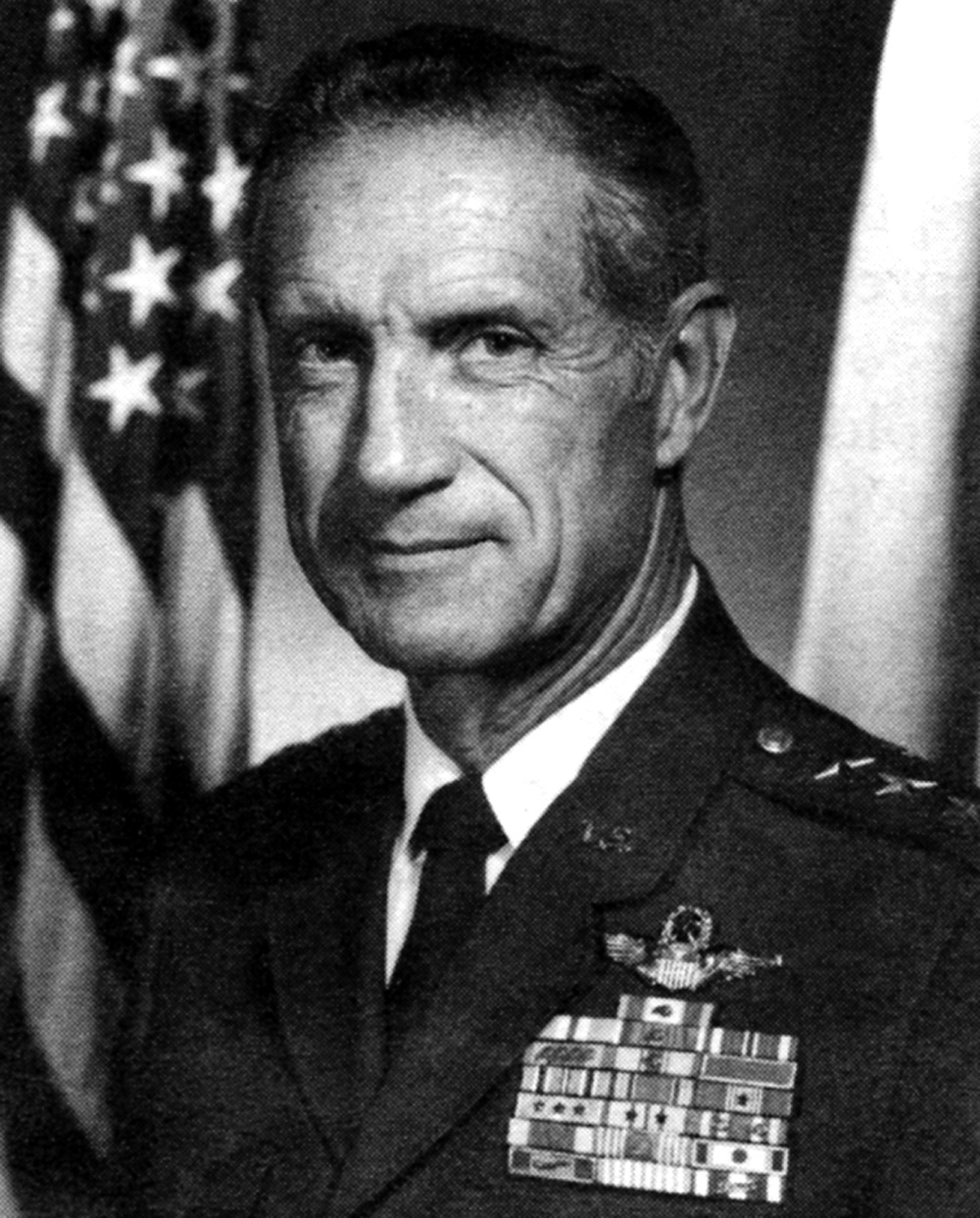
- Born: October 3, 1925; Minden, Louisiana, U.S.
- Died: March 15, 2022 (aged 96); Potomac Falls, Virginia, U.S.
- Military career
- Allegiance: United States of America
- Branch: United States Air Force
- Service years: 1948–1983
- Rank: Lieutenant general
- Commands: Pacific Air Forces
- Conflicts: Korean War; Vietnam War
- Awards: Air Force Distinguished Service Medal; Legion of Merit; Distinguished Flying Cross; Defense Superior Service Medal; Air Medal

Arnold Webb Braswell (October 3, 1925 – March 15, 2022) was a lieutenant general in the United States Air Force (USAF) and command pilot who was commander in chief of Pacific Air Forces, with headquarters at Hickam Air Force Base in Hawaii. His command comprised more than 34,000 USAF operational and support personnel stationed at eight major bases and more than 87 facilities principally located in Japan, South Korea, the Philippines and Hawaii.

== Early life and education ==
Braswell was born in 1925 to Claiborne and Marguerite Braswell in Minden, Louisiana, and graduated in 1942 from Minden High School. He attended Louisiana State University for two years and in 1944 entered the U.S. Military Academy at West Point, New York. He was appointed Cadet Brigade Commander, the "First Captain", of the corps of cadets in his final year and graduated in 1948 with honors and earned a commission as a second lieutenant in the newly established United States Air Force. After graduation Braswell married his high school sweetheart, Ione Davis. She gave birth to their son Jefferson in 1949 and daughter Sally in 1955.

== Career ==
After completing flying training at Randolph Air Force Base in San Antonio, Texas and at Williams AFB in Arizona, he became in September 1949, a member of the 33rd Fighter Wing at Otis AFB in Massachusetts, where he flew F-86 Sabre fighter jets.

In 1951–1952 during the Korean War, Braswell flew 155 combat missions in jet fighters as a member of the 49th Fighter-Bomber Wing, Taegu Air Base, South Korea, and the 4th Fighter-Interceptor Wing at Kimpo Air Base, South Korea.

From September 1952 to September 1955, he was a flight commander and squadron operations officer in the 3600th Combat Crew Training Group at Luke AFB in Arizona. When the U.S. Air Force Academy opened in 1955 in temporary facilities at Lowry AFB, Colorado, Braswell was assigned as commander of one of the original four cadet squadrons and served in that capacity for three years.

In October 1958, he was again assigned to the 49th Fighter-Bomber Wing, which had been relocated to Étain Air Base in France, where for a time he was deployed to supervise combat training of French, Danish and Turkish air force pilots in F-100 Super Sabre fighter aircraft and then commanded the 7th Tactical Fighter Squadron at Spangdahlem Air Base in West Germany.

Braswell returned to the United States in August 1961 to attend the Air Command and Staff College at Maxwell AFB, Alabama. He transferred to Washington, D.C., in July 1962 and was assigned to Headquarters U.S. Air Force in the Directorate of Plans, where he prepared recommendations to the Air Force Chief of Staff on joint planning issues. In August 1966, Braswell entered the National War College at Fort Lesley J. McNair in Washington, D.C. He graduated from the college and also completed his Master of Business Administration degree from George Washington University in 1967.

He began a one-year tour of duty in the Vietnam War in July 1967 as director of plans at 7th Air Force headquarters, Tan Son Nhut Air Base, South Vietnam. Though a staff officer and not required to fly, he voluntarily flew 40 combat missions, most of them in F-4 Phantoms.

Following his return from Southeast Asia in August 1968, Braswell became the director of operations for the 4th Tactical Fighter Wing at Seymour Johnson AFB in North Carolina. He was again assigned to Air Force headquarters in August 1969 in the Office of the Deputy Chief of Staff, Plans and Operations, where he served initially as an Air Staff planning representative in Joint Staff planning conferences. In 1970 he was promoted to the grade of brigadier general and assigned as deputy director for force development in the Directorate of Plans, and in February 1972, he became deputy director of plans. In February 1973, Braswell was promoted to the grade of major general and assumed command of United States Air Force units based in Turkey, with headquarters in Ankara.

Braswell was assigned to Supreme Headquarters Allied Powers Europe, Belgium, as assistant chief of staff for operations from September 1974 to June 1977. In July 1977 he was promoted to lieutenant general and returned to the United States as Director for Plans and Policy (J-5), Organization of the Joint Chiefs of Staff in the Pentagon. In June 1978, he became commander of Tactical Air Command's 9th Air Force with headquarters at Shaw AFB in South Carolina. In that position he also served as commander of the USAF units assigned to the Rapid Deployment Joint Task Force of the U.S. Readiness Command. In June, 1981 he was appointed Commander-in-Chief of Pacific Air Forces, a USAF Major Command, headquartered in Hawaii, which encompassed all of the tactical air combat units in the Pacific Theater.

The general in his Air Force career logged more than 5,500 flying hours, most of these in jet fighters.

He was promoted to lieutenant general July 1, 1977, with date of rank listed as June 28, 1977. He retired on October 1, 1983.

After retiring from the USAF, Braswell served for ten years in Arlington, Virginia, as the President of the Air Conditioning and Refrigeration Institute (ARI), the national trade association of companies involved in the manufacture of air-conditioning and refrigeration equipment. In this capacity he helped guide ground-breaking negotiations with major environmental groups to write and propose to Congress legislation establishing national mandatory efficiency standards for energy-consuming appliances. Both houses of the Congress passed the proposed legislation as written by unanimous vote, and it was signed into law by President Reagan. Under his guidance ARI also coordinated extensive research by industry companies to develop and employ new refrigerants that would not damage the protective ozone layer in the upper atmosphere.

== Awards and recognitions ==
His military decorations and awards include the Air Force Distinguished Service Medal with oak leaf cluster, Defense Superior Service Medal, Legion of Merit with oak leaf cluster, Distinguished Flying Cross, and Air Medal with four oak leaf clusters.

== Personal life ==
After retirement, Braswell served for six years as a member of the Volunteer Advisory Board for the public school technical training courses in Fairfax County, Virginia, and also for six years as the President of the Chesterbrook Woods Citizen's Association in McLean, Virginia. In 2009, he and Ione moved to Falcons Landing, a lifetime continuing care retirement facility in Potomac Falls, Virginia. Braswell died on March 15, 2022, at the age of 96.
