= Bob Dove =

American football player and coach (1921–2006)

No. 55, 35, 42, 78
- Position: End

Personal information
- Born: February 21, 1921; Youngstown, Ohio, U.S.
- Died: April 19, 2006 (aged 85); Canfield, Ohio, U.S.
- Listed height: 6 ft 2 in (1.88 m)
- Listed weight: 222 lb (101 kg)

Career information
- High school: South (Youngstown)
- College: Notre Dame (1939–1942)
- NFL draft: 1943: 5th round, 40th overall pick

Career history

Playing
- Chicago Rockets (1946–1947); Chicago Cardinals (1948–1953); Detroit Lions (1953–1954)

Coaching
- Chicago Rockets (1946) Head coach; Detroit (1955–1957) Assistant coach; Detroit Lions (1958–1959) Ends coach; Buffalo Bills (1960–1961) Line coach; Hiram College (1962–1968) Head coach; Youngstown State (1969–1986) Assistant coach; Youngstown State (1987–1991) Coach emeritus

Awards and highlights
- NFL champion (1953); Pro Bowl (1950); 2× Consensus All-American (1941, 1942)

Career NFL/AAFC statistics
- Receiving yards: 128
- Interceptions: 1
- Touchdowns: 2
- Stats at Pro Football Reference

Head coaching record
- Career: AAFC: 2–2–1 (.500); College: 22–34 (.393)
- Coaching profile at Pro Football Reference
- College Football Hall of Fame

Robert Leo Patrick "Grandpappy" Dove (February 21, 1921 – April 19, 2006) was an American professional football player and coach. He played college football at the University of Notre Dame and professionally for nine seasons in the National Football League (NFL). Following his retirement as a player, Dove embarked on a 37-year coaching career at the professional and collegiate levels. He was inducted into the College Football Hall of Fame as a player in 2001.

== Early life ==
Dove was born in Youngstown, Ohio, a steel-production center located near the Pennsylvania border. Dove was a three-year starter at the city's South High School from 1936 to 1938, and he was selected as an all-city player by the Youngstown Vindicator (the local daily paper) in his final year.

== Playing career ==
Dove went on to greater athletic feats at the University of Notre Dame, where he was a three-year starter at the end, from 1940 to 1942. He was a consensus All-American in his final two seasons. As a freshman in 1939, he caught 15 passes for 87 yards. Dove then became the first sophomore to start for the Notre Dame "Fighting Irish" in 11 seasons. He received the Knute Rockne Memorial Trophy in 1942 as the top lineman in the country and also played in the East–West Shrine Game. During his three seasons as a starter, Dove helped the Irish to a 22–4–3 record, including an undefeated (8–0–1) campaign in the first season of legendary coach Frank Leahy.

In 1948, Dove joined the NFL's Chicago Cardinals, where he played for five seasons. In 1953, he was traded to the Detroit Lions and played on their 1953 and 1954 championship teams. He retired in 1955.

== Coaching career ==
In the All-America Football Conference, Dove was a co-coach for the Chicago Rockets in 1946. Dove was an assistant coach at the University of Detroit from 1955 to 1957, and then became an assistant for the Lions from 1958 to 59, and for the Buffalo Bills in 1960 from 1961. He was the head coach at Hiram College for seven seasons, from 1962 to 1968. He joined the Youngstown State University staff in 1969, where he served as an assistant under four coaches, including Jim Tressel. In 1987, Dove was named coach emeritus and served in that position through the 1991 NCAA Division I-AA national championship season.

== Death ==
Following a long illness, Dove died in Canfield, Ohio, on April 19, 2006. His funeral was held at St. Michael's Roman Catholic Church in Canfield.

== Legacy ==
Beyond his 2001 induction into the College Football Hall of Fame, Dove was also a second-team selection on Street & Smith's All-Time Dream Team, which covered players from the first 50 years of its publication (1941–1990). Dove was chosen at defensive end on the second team, ranked behind Ted Hendricks of Miami and Hugh Green of Pittsburgh, and alongside Bubba Smith of Michigan State.

Earlier, in 1975, Dove was one of 10 players inducted into the Citizens Savings Hall of Fame in Los Angeles. The other nine players were Ron Beagle, Navy; Chuck Bednarik, Pennsylvania: Carl Diehl, Dartmouth; Bill Fisher, Notre Dame; Leroy Keyes, Purdue; Tommy Nobis, Texas; Greg Pruitt, Oklahoma; Joe Romig, Colorado; and Charles "Bubba" Smith, Michigan State.

== Head coaching record ==
=== College ===
Year	Team	Overall	Conference	Standing	Bowl/playoffs
Hiram Terriers (Ohio Athletic Conference) (1962–1968)
1962	Hiram	5–3	4–2	6th	
1963	Hiram	3–5	2–3	9th	
1964	Hiram	3–5	2–4	T–10th	
1965	Hiram	4–4	3–4	T–8th	
1966	Hiram	3–5	3–4	7th	
1967	Hiram	3–5	2–5	11th	
1968	Hiram	1–7	0–7	14th	
Hiram:		22–34	16–29		
Total:		22–34			
