= George E. Martin =

United States Army general (1902–1995)

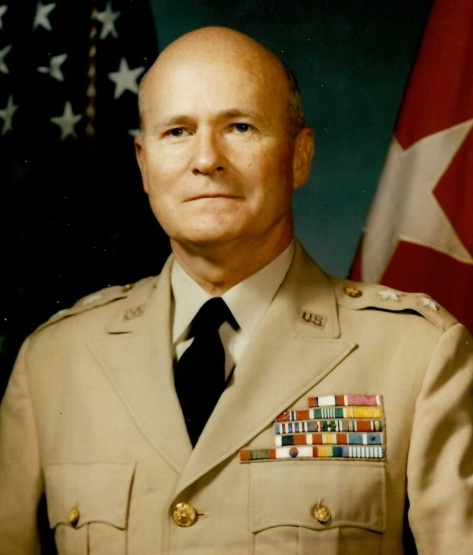
- Martin as a major general in 1954
- Born: 1 November 1902; Clinton, Iowa, US
- Died: 30 January 1995 (aged 92); Bradenton, Florida, US
- Burial place: Arlington National Cemetery
- Education: United States Military Academy; United States Army Command and General Staff College; Imperial Defense College
- Spouse(s): Ida Josephine Hale (m. 1927–1984) Mary E. Collins (m. 1990–1995)
- Children: 2
- Military career
- Service: United States Army
- Service years: 1927–1962
- Rank: Major General
- Service number: 016802
- Unit: U.S. Army Infantry Branch
- Commands: Headquarters Detachment, 1st Battalion, 14th Infantry Regiment; Company C, 1st Battalion, 35th Infantry Regiment; Company D, 1st Battalion, 35th Infantry Regiment; Headquarters and Headquarters Company, 35th Infantry Regiment; 3rd Battalion, 47th Infantry Regiment; 10th Infantry Division; U.S. Army Director of Officer Assignments
- Wars: World War II; Korean War
- Awards: Army Distinguished Service Medal (2); Legion of Merit (3); Bronze Star Medal (2); Croix de Guerre with Palm (France); Order of Military Merit (Taegeuk) (South Korea)
- Other work: Author

Signature
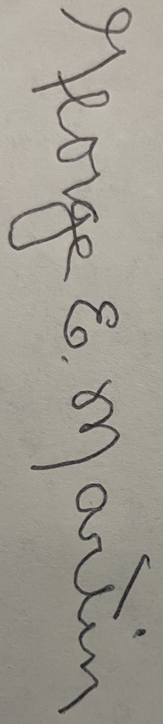

George Edward Martin (1 November 1902 – 30 January 1995) was a career officer in the United States Army. A veteran of World War II and the Korean War, he attained the rank of major general as commander of the 10th Infantry Division. Martin served from 1927 to 1962 and his decorations included multiple awards of the Army Distinguished Service Medal, Legion of Merit and Bronze Star Medal.

Martin was a native of Clinton, Iowa and was raised and educated in Wyandotte, Michigan. He graduated from Wisconsin's Northwestern Military and Naval Academy in 1921. He graduated from the United States Military Academy in 1927 and began a long career as an Infantry officer. In the years prior to World War II, Martin's duty stations included Fort Eustis, Virginia, Fort Davis, Panama, and Forts Crook and Omaha in Nebraska. He served for almost four years as professor of military science at Northwestern Military and for three with the 35th Infantry in Hawaii.

During the Second World War, Martin served in Europe as assistant chief of staff for operations (G-3) of the 45th Infantry Division and chief of staff for the 44th Infantry Division. After the war, Martin was assigned to the faculty of the United States Army Command and General Staff College, then attended England's Imperial Defense College. Upon returning to the United States, he attended the National War College, then served as a NATO policy planner. Beginning in 1952, Martin served in South Korea during the Korean War. Initially assigned as assistant chief of staff for operations (G-3) with Eighth United States Army, he later served as assistant division commander of the 7th Infantry Division.

After his Korean War service, Martin served as assistant division commander of the 10th Infantry Division, and he commanded the division from April 1955 to March 1956. He was assigned to West Germany as assistant chief of staff for personnel (G-1) at United States Army Europe from 1956 to 1958. From 1958 until his 1962 retirement, he was assigned to the army staff for personnel as chief of assignments. In retirement, Martin resided first in Hawaii, and later in Bradenton, Florida, and authored numerous magazine and journal articles, as well as his 1986 memoir, Blow, Bugle, Blow. He died in Bradenton on 30 January 1995 and was buried at Arlington National Cemetery.

== Early life ==
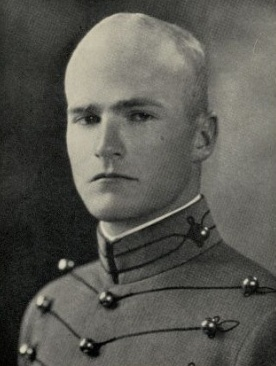
Martin as a West Point cadet in 1927

Martin was born in Clinton, Iowa on 1 November 1902, the son of Dr. Albert Lewis Martin and Mary Louise (McKee) Martin. He was raised and educated in Wyandotte, Michigan, then began attendance at the Northwestern Military and Naval Academy in Lake Geneva, Wisconsin. He graduated in 1921 and was both the senior cadet and class valedictorian. He attended the University of Michigan and the College of the City of Detroit from 1921 to 1923 while attempting to obtain an appointment to the United States Military Academy at West Point. Selected by US Senator James Couzens as one of three applicants to take the entrance examination at Fort Hayes, Ohio, Martin received the appointment after the other two candidates failed their physical exams.

Martin attended West Point from 1923 to 1927 and graduated ranked 69th in his class of 203. During his senior year he was chosen as first captain, the highest cadet leadership position. At graduation, Martin received his commission as a second lieutenant of Infantry.

=== Family ===
On 20 June 1927, Martin married Ida Josephine Hale of Natchez, Mississippi. They were married until her death in 1984 and were the parents of two children, son Albert (born 1928) and daughter Beverly (1929–1954). Martin was the winner of his Class Cup, a memento presented to the first member of a West Point class to marry and father a son. In 1990, Martin married Mary E. Collins.

== Early career ==
After receiving his commission, Martin was assigned to the 34th Infantry Regiment at Fort Eustis, Virginia. In September 1929 he was transferred to the 14th Infantry and posted to Fort Davis, Panama, where he commanded the headquarters detachment of the regiment's 1st Battalion and served as battalion adjutant. From October 1930 to October 1931, he was an instructor at Fort Sherman's West Point Preparatory School. He served with the 17th Infantry at Fort Omaha, Nebraska until August 1933, and received promotion to first lieutenant in March 1933. From September 1933 to June 1934, he was a student in the company officers' course at the Infantry School. He was then assigned as professor of military science at Northwestern Military, where he served until June 1938. Martin received promotion to captain in June 1937.

In 1938, Martin was assigned to the 35th Infantry at Schofield Barracks, Hawaii, where he commanded Company C and Company D (Heavy Weapons) of the 1st Battalion, then was assigned to command the regimental headquarters company. With the Army expanding in anticipation of US entry into World War II, in April 1941, he was assigned to the 47th Infantry Regiment, a unit of the newly activated 9th Infantry Division. He commanded the regiment's 3rd Battalion during the 1941 Carolina Maneuvers, then served as the regimental operations officer (S-3), which was followed by assignment as the regimental executive officer.

In May 1942, Martin was assigned to the 45th Infantry Division and assigned as assistant chief of staff for operations (G-3). After graduating from the United States Army Command and General Staff College in 1943, he served as the 45th Division's G-3 during combat in Sicily and Italy, including the Battle of Salerno. He later served as the division chief of staff, to include the Battle of Anzio. In December 1944, he was assigned as chief of staff for the 44th Infantry Division. He served with this division during combat in France and Germany, and remained as chief of staff through the end of the war in Europe. The 44th Division returned to the United States in July 1945 and began training for deployment to the Asiatic-Pacific theater. The end of the war in August 1945 caused this mission to conclude, and the division was inactivated in November 1945.

== Later career ==
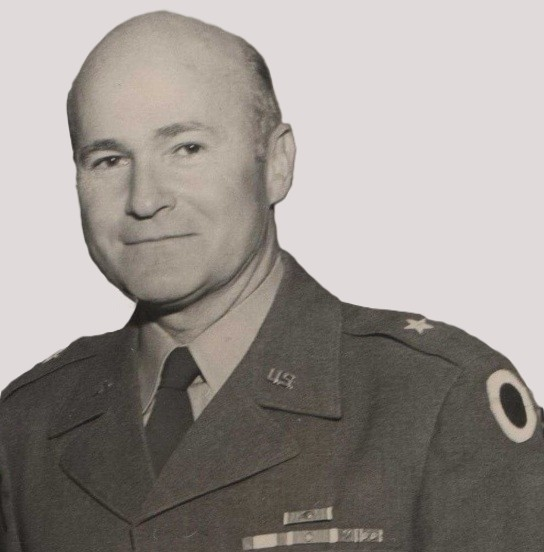
Martin as a brigadier general in 1952

In 1946, Martin's wartime service resulted in equivalent credit for attendance at the newly organized Armed Forces Staff College. From 1946 to 1948, he was assigned to the faculty of the United States Army Command and General Staff College. From 1948 to 1949, he was a student at London's Imperial Defense College. From 1949 to 1952 he was a member of the faculty at the National War College.

In July 1952, Martin was assigned to Korean War duty as assistant chief of staff for operations (G-3) with the Eighth US Army in Seoul. He subsequently served as deputy chief of staff for plans and operations, which was followed by assignment as assistant division commander (ADC) of the 7th Infantry Division. In December 1953, he was assigned as ADC of the recently reactivated 10th Infantry Division. In April 1955, he was assigned as division commander, and he held this position until March 1956. In May 1956, Martin was assigned to the staff of United States Army Europe as assistant chief of staff for personnel (G-1). From 1958 until his 1962 retirement, Martin served as chief of the officer assignments division in the office of the US Army deputy chief of staff for personnel (G-1).

In retirement, Martin resided first in Sarasota, Florida, then Honolulu, and later in Bradenton, Florida. In addition to membership in the Association of Graduates of the United States Military Academy, he belonged to the Military Order of the World Wars, Mayflower Society, and Sons of the American Revolution. He authored numerous articles for magazines and professional journals and also completed work on a memoir, 1986's Blow, Bugle, Blow. He died in Bradenton on 30 January 1995. He was buried at Arlington National Cemetery.

== Awards ==
Martin's awards included:

- Army Distinguished Service Medal with oak leaf cluster
- Legion of Merit with 2 oak leaf clusters
- Bronze Star Medal with oak leaf cluster
- Croix de Guerre with Palm (France)
- Order of Military Merit (Taegeuk) (South Korea)

== Dates of rank ==
- Second Lieutenant, 14 June 1927
- First Lieutenant, 1 March 1933
- Captain, 14 June 1937
- Major (Army of the United States), 31 January 1941
- Lieutenant Colonel (Army of the United States), 11 March 1942
- Colonel (Army of the United States), 7 June 1944
- Major, 14 June 1944
- Lieutenant Colonel, 15 July 1948
- Colonel, 2 January 1951
- Brigadier General (Army of the United States), 1 January 1951
- Major General (Army of the United States), 20 July 1952
- Brigadier General, 16 September 1954
- Major General, 18 October 1954
- Major General (Retired), 30 April 1962
