= Northwestern Military and Naval Academy =

High school in Linn, Wisconsin, US

Coordinates: 42°32′54″N 88°31′31″W

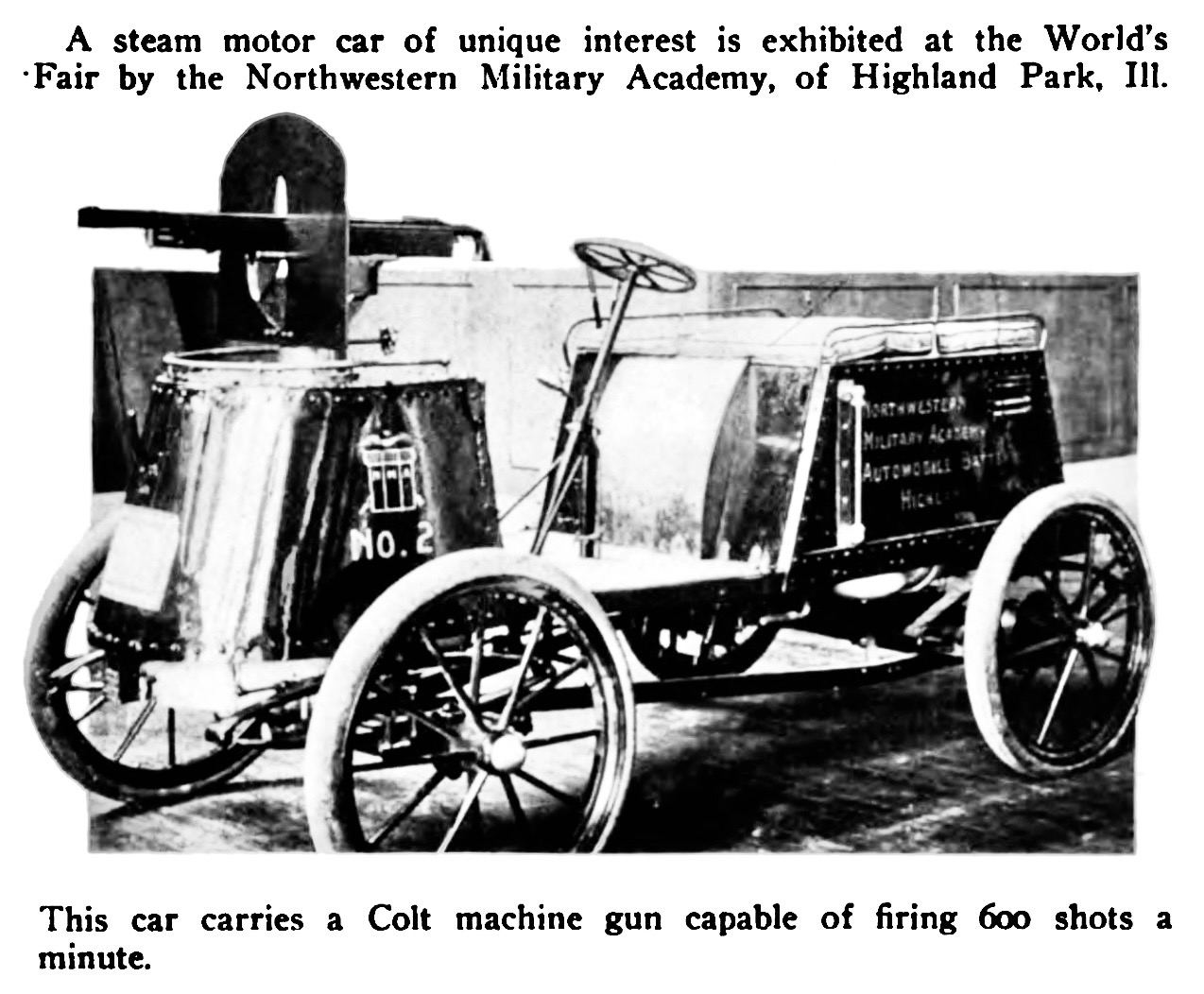
Northwestern Military and Naval Academy steam motor car with machine gun (1904)

Northwestern Military Academy (founded 1888) was a residential high school in Linn, Wisconsin which was founded by Harlan Page Davidson. Originally located in Highland Park, Illinois, the school was relocated to the town of Linn, Wisconsin on the south shore of Geneva Lake near the city of Lake Geneva in 1915 and was renamed Northwestern Military and Naval Academy.

During the academy's century of operation at this location , its primary goal was to mold young men, grades 7–12, into outstanding citizens, eager and ready for higher levels of education. The institution adhered to the visions and principles of Davidson which adopted military structure and religious principles into an exceptionally sound educational program. The results were a capstone curriculum which ranked the academy as one of the most prestigious schools within the nation. Within the later years of its operation the institution decided to expand upon its enrollment spectrum and began accepting students from the 7th and 8th grade level.

Two large 60" x 336" murals of John Kinzie and party first encounters with the Potawatomi Indians around 1841 were painted by Chicago artist Louis Grell. The first mural was a gift of the class of 1939 and the second a gift by the class of 1940. The large murals hung in the grand west and east wings of Davidson Hall for many decades until St. John's acquired and merged with the Academy in 1995. The murals are now in a controlled storage vault on the campus in Delafield, WI.

In 1995, the institution merged with St John's Military Academy to form St. John's Northwestern Military Academy. Before the beginning of the 21st century, the property was sold to a developing company. The several acres of NMNA land have been transformed into a community peppered with expensive homes. The Davidson building in Lake Geneva no longer exists, but in its place is a piece of stone from the school with a plaque of remembrance. The building is listed on the state and the National Register of Historic Places. Scenes of the building interior were used for filming of Damien: Omen II.

== Headmasters ==
Northwestern's headmasters included:

- Colonel Harlan Page Davidson, 1888–1911
- Colonel Royal Page Davidson, 1911–1942
- Colonel Albion B. Lewis, 1942–1944
- Father James Howard Jacobson, 1944–1972
- Daniel A. Snow, 1972–1992
- Colonel Alfred Greishaber, 1992–1994
- John C. Harrington, 1994–1995

== Principals ==
- Colonel Walter S. Hahn, 1954-1970

== Notable alumni ==
- George E. Martin (1921) – US Army major general
- Curtis Roosevelt (1948) – eldest grandson of President Franklin D. Roosevelt; served as a delegate to the United Nations
- Marshall S. Roth (1925) – U.S. Air Force Major General
- Spencer Tracy (1919–1920) – actor (attended)
- Arthur W. Wermuth (1932) – U.S. Army Major, WWII
