= Fred Mundee =

American football player (1913–1990)

No. 36, 20
- Positions: Center, linebacker

Personal information
- Born: May 20, 1913; Youngstown, Ohio, U.S.
- Died: January 15, 1990 (aged 76); Harvey, Illinois, U.S.
- Listed height: 6 ft 1 in (1.85 m)
- Listed weight: 220 lb (100 kg)

Career information
- High school: South (Youngstown)
- College: Notre Dame (1933–1936)

Career history
- Chicago Bears (1943–1945)

Awards and highlights
- NFL champion (1943)
- Stats at Pro Football Reference

Frederick William Mundee (May 20, 1913 – January 15, 1990) was an American professional football player who played three seasons with the Chicago Bears of the National Football League (NFL). He played college football at the University of Notre Dame.

== Early life and college ==
Frederick William Mundee was born on May 20, 1913, in Youngstown, Ohio. He attended South High School in Youngstown.

He was a member of the Notre Dame Fighting Irish from 1933 to 1936.

== Professional career ==
Mundee signed with the Chicago Bears of the National Football League (NFL) in 1943. He played in five games for the Bears during the 1943 season, recording one interception. He also played in the 1943 NFL Championship Game, a 41–21 victory over the Washington Redskins. Mundee played in all ten games, starting one, in 1944 and made one interception. He appeared in six games, starting one, during his final season with the Bears in 1945.

== Personal life ==
After his football career, Mundee was an inspector for the Chicago Department of Water and Sewers for 30 years before retiring in 1975. He died on January 15, 1990, at Ingalls Memorial Hospital in Harvey, Illinois.
