= South High School (Youngstown, Ohio) =

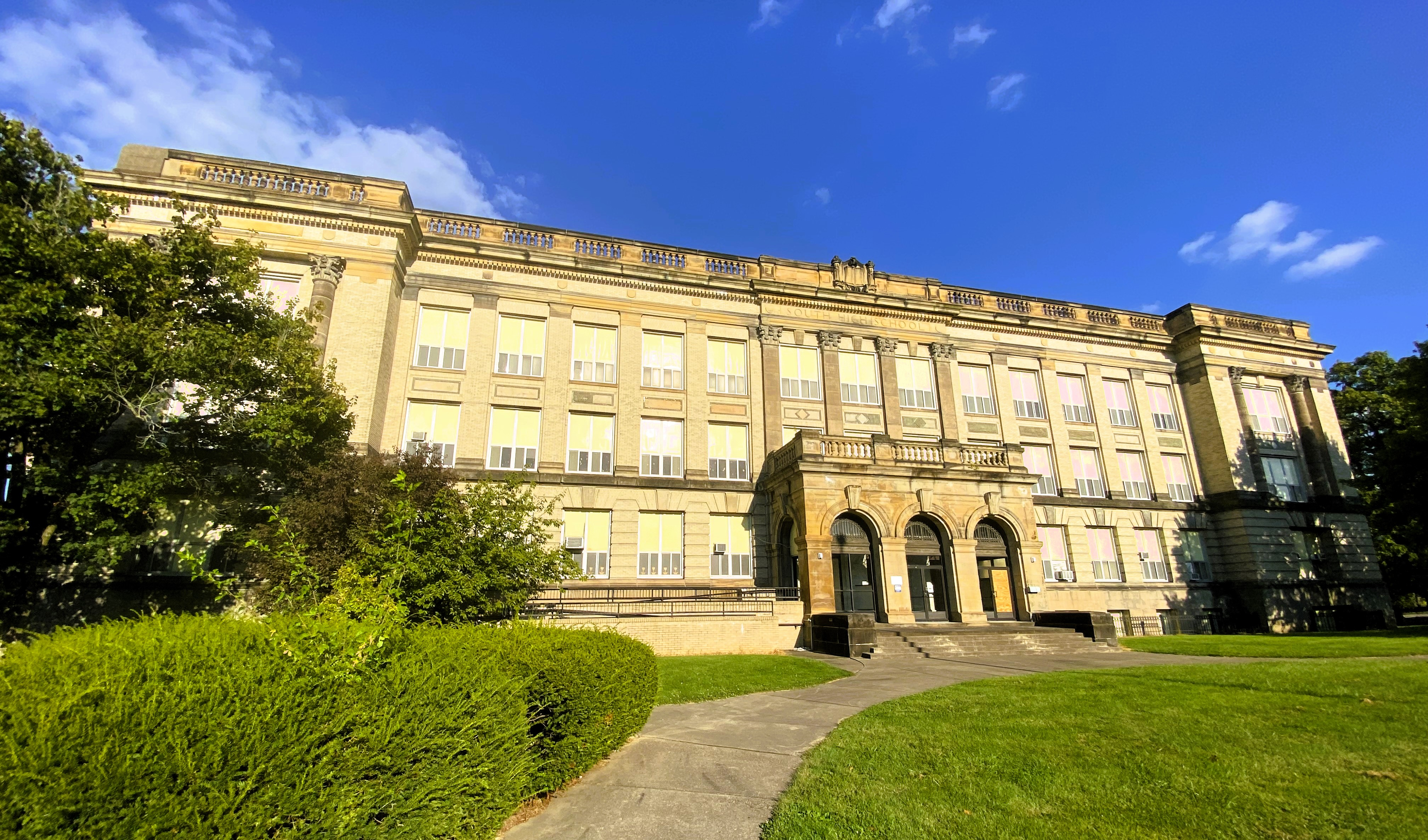
- Former South High School and Eagle Heights Academy

Location
- 1833 Market Street; Youngstown, Mahoning County, Ohio 44507; United States

Information
- Type: Public high school
- Established: 1911
- Closed: 1993
- School district: Youngstown City School District
- NCES District ID: 3904516
- Grades: 9-12
- Gender: Coeducational
- Colors: Red and Blue
- Nickname: Warriors

South High School was a public high school in Youngstown, Ohio, United States. It was a part of the Youngstown City School District. South opened in 1911 and was closed following the 1992–1993 school year.

== History ==
Youngstown South High School was established in the early 20th century during a period of rapid population growth driven by the city’s booming steel industry. The school opened its doors in 1911, becoming the first major expansion of secondary education in the city beyond The Rayen School, which had previously served as Youngstown’s only public high school.

As Youngstown’s population expanded through the early and mid-20th century, South High experienced overcrowding, which led directly to the creation of additional schools. Most notably, Woodrow Wilson High School was converted into a full high school in 1936 specifically to relieve enrollment pressure at South High.

The decline of the steel industry beginning in the late 1970s caused a sharp population decrease in Youngstown, significantly impacting school enrollment across the district. As families left the area, the need for multiple large high schools diminished.

Due to these long-term demographic and economic changes, Youngstown South High School closed after the 1992–1993 school year, ending more than 80 years of operation. The building housed the Eagle Heights Academy until 2011, when the school closed, due to being ranked in the academic emergency list for two consecutive years. The building has since been vacant.

== Notable alumni ==
- Simeon Booker, civil rights journalist, Jet Magazine
- Bob Dove, former professional football player and coach
- Robert F. Durkin, US Air Force, former director of Defense Mapping Agency
- Nathaniel R. Jones, retired U.S. District Court judge, a participant in the Nelson Mandela government transition
- Fred Mundee, former professional football player
- Wilbur F. Simlik, US Marine Corps, former Fiscal Director of the Marine Corps
- Ronald Torbert, referee in the National Football League (NFL)
