= Robert F. Durkin =

Former senior officer in the United States Air Force

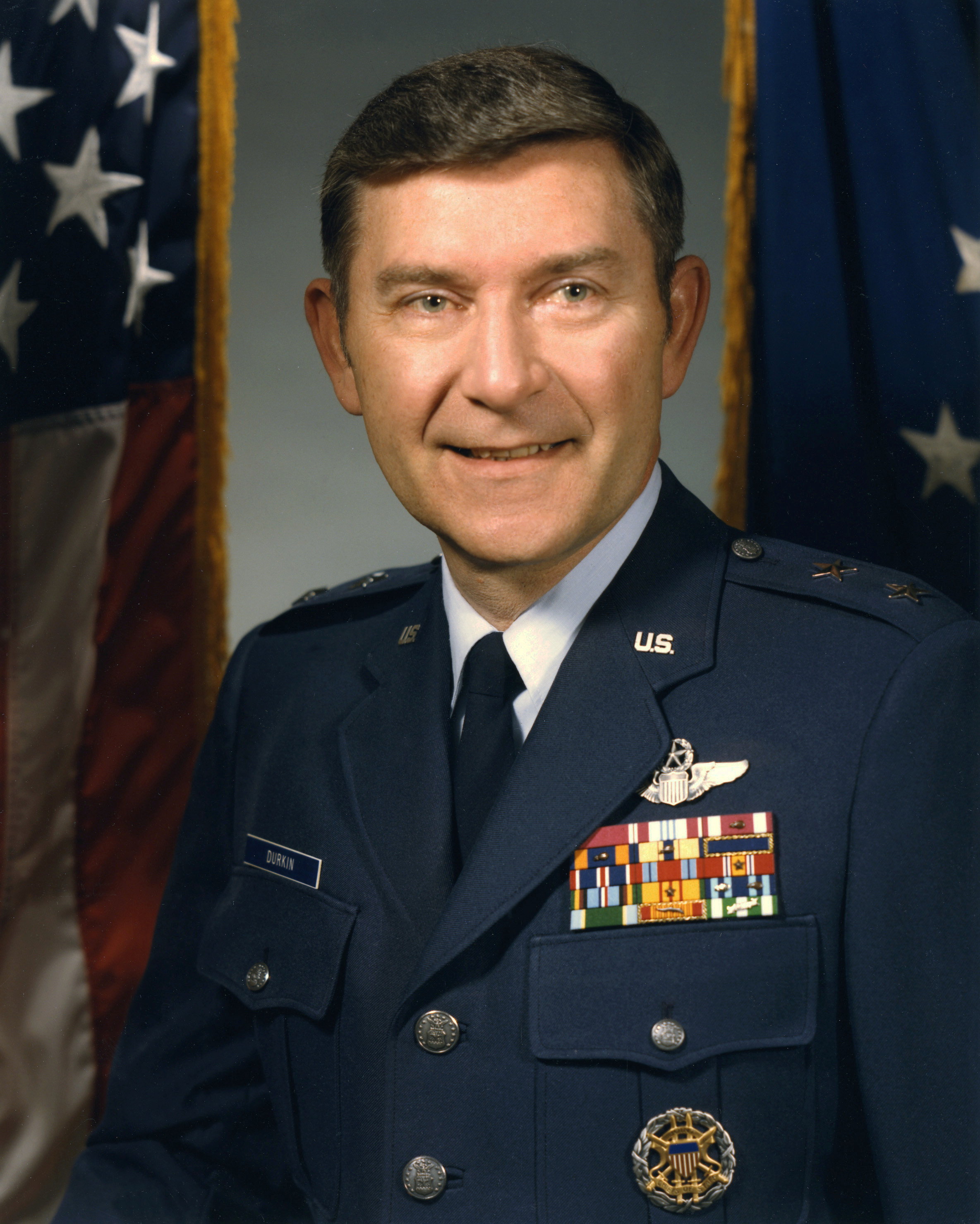
- Major General Robert F. Durkin
- Born: February 13, 1936; Youngstown, Ohio, U.S.
- Died: November 14, 2004 (aged 68) Orlando, Florida, U.S.
- Allegiance: United States of America
- Branch: United States Air Force
- Service years: 1958–1990
- Rank: Major General
- Conflicts: Vietnam War
- Awards: Distinguished Service Medal; Legion of Merit; Defense Meritorious Service Medal; Meritorious Service Medal with oak leaf cluster; Air Medal with oak leaf cluster; Air Force Commendation Medal with oak leaf cluster; Combat Readiness Medal; Republic of Vietnam Gallantry Cross with Palm; Republic of Vietnam Campaign Medal

Major General Robert Francis Durkin of the United States Air Force was Director of Defense Mapping Agency from October 1987 to June 1990. As director, Durkin restructured the Defense Mapping Agency's international and domestic training in the production and exploitation of geospatial information.

== Early life, and education ==
General Durkin was born in Youngstown, Ohio; in 1936, and graduated from Youngstown South High School in 1954. He earned a bachelor of science degree in military science from the United States Military Academy in 1958, and a master of science degree in engineering management from Rensselaer Polytechnic Institute in 1966. General Durkin completed Armed Forces Staff College in 1971, Air War College in 1978 and graduated from the Institute for Higher Defense Studies in 1983.

== Career ==
Upon graduation from United States Military Academy, he was commissioned as a second lieutenant. He began primary pilot training at Bartow Air Force Base, Florida, and was awarded his wings in September 1959, when he completed basic pilot training at Webb Air Force Base, Texas. General Durkin then attended F-86L interceptor training at Moody Air Force Base, Georgia, and B-52 combat crew training at Castle Air Force Base, California; before reporting to his first operational assignment as a B-52 co-pilot with the 4038th Strategic Wing, Dow Air Force Base, Maine, in 1960.

A year later he transferred to Homestead Air Force Base, Florida; where he served as an aircraft commander until June 1965. After completing his graduate studies, General Durkin returned to operational duty by attending C-130 combat crew training at Sewart Air Force Base, Tennessee; and the Replacement Training Unit at Dyess Air Force Base, Texas. In October 1966 he reported to Ching Chuan Kang Air Base, Taiwan, as an aircraft commander.

When he returned to the United States in November 1967, General Durkin was assigned as a test and deployment officer with Aeronautical Systems Division, Wright-Patterson Air Force Base, Ohio. In August 1968 he transferred to the Armament Development and Test Center, Eglin Air Force Base, Florida; as a program manager for research and development of conventional munitions.

In July 1970 General Durkin entered Armed Forces Staff College and, upon graduation, was assigned as a staff development engineer, Office of the Deputy Chief of Staff, Research and Development; headquartered U.S. Air Force, Washington, D.C. He remained in Washington, D.C., for four years before moving to Ellsworth Air Force Base, South Dakota; as chief of the Operations and Training Division, 28th Bombardment Wing. He then commanded the 77th Bombardment Squadron there, from April 1976 to July 1977.

After graduation from Air War College, General Durkin served as a nuclear employment and policy planner and then as chief of the Nuclear Division, Organization of the Joint Chiefs of Staff, Washington, D.C., until August 1980. He subsequently became deputy commander for operations, 5th Bombardment Wing, Minot Air Force Base, North Dakota; and, in March 1981, became wing vice commander. He assumed command of the 28th Bombardment Wing at Ellsworth Air Force Base in October 1981.

In May 1983 the general returned to Air Force headquarters as deputy for strategic forces at Directorate of Operational Requirements, Office of the Deputy Chief of Staff; Research, Development and Acquisition.

He remained at Air Force headquarters and served as deputy director of operations from October 1984 to September 1985, when he became deputy director of plans. In March 1986 General Durkin was assigned as deputy director for foreign intelligence at Defense Intelligence Agency, Defense Intelligence Analysis Center.

== Defense Mapping Agency ==
Major General Robert F. Durkin became director of Defense Mapping Agency (DMA) in October 1987; a position which he held till June 1990. As director of the DMA, Durkin oversaw the development of products that supported the Single Integrated Operational Plan – America's broad plan for nuclear war for over 40 years – which was a vital component in defense of United States of America during the final years of the Cold War.

Also during his tenure, Durkin oversaw Phase II (Mark 90) of the Digital Production System (DPS), an ambitious and critical modernization program which sought to redesign and retool the agency's mapping, charting, and geodesy production systems and processes. Phase I (Mark 85) of the DPS upgraded DMA's film-based production system and provided an initial digital exploitation capability using new source materials. Phase II (Mark 90) provided an all-digital production system, increased throughput, provided greater product flexibility and improved responsiveness for the products in the DPS baseline.

Major General Durkin retired on July 1, 1990.

== Death ==
Major General Durkin died on November 14, 2004, in Orlando, Florida. He was buried at Arlington National Cemetery on January 3, 2005.

== Awards, and decorations ==
Major General Durkin was a command pilot with more than 4,600 flying hours, including ninety-seven combat missions in Southeast Asia. His military decorations and awards include:

- Distinguished Service Medal
- Legion of Merit
- Defense Meritorious Service Medal
- Meritorious Service Medal with oak leaf cluster
- Air Medal with oak leaf cluster
- Air Force Commendation Medal with oak leaf cluster
- Combat Readiness Medal
- Republic of Vietnam Gallantry Cross with Palm
- Republic of Vietnam Campaign Medal
