= Simone Askew =

US Army officer

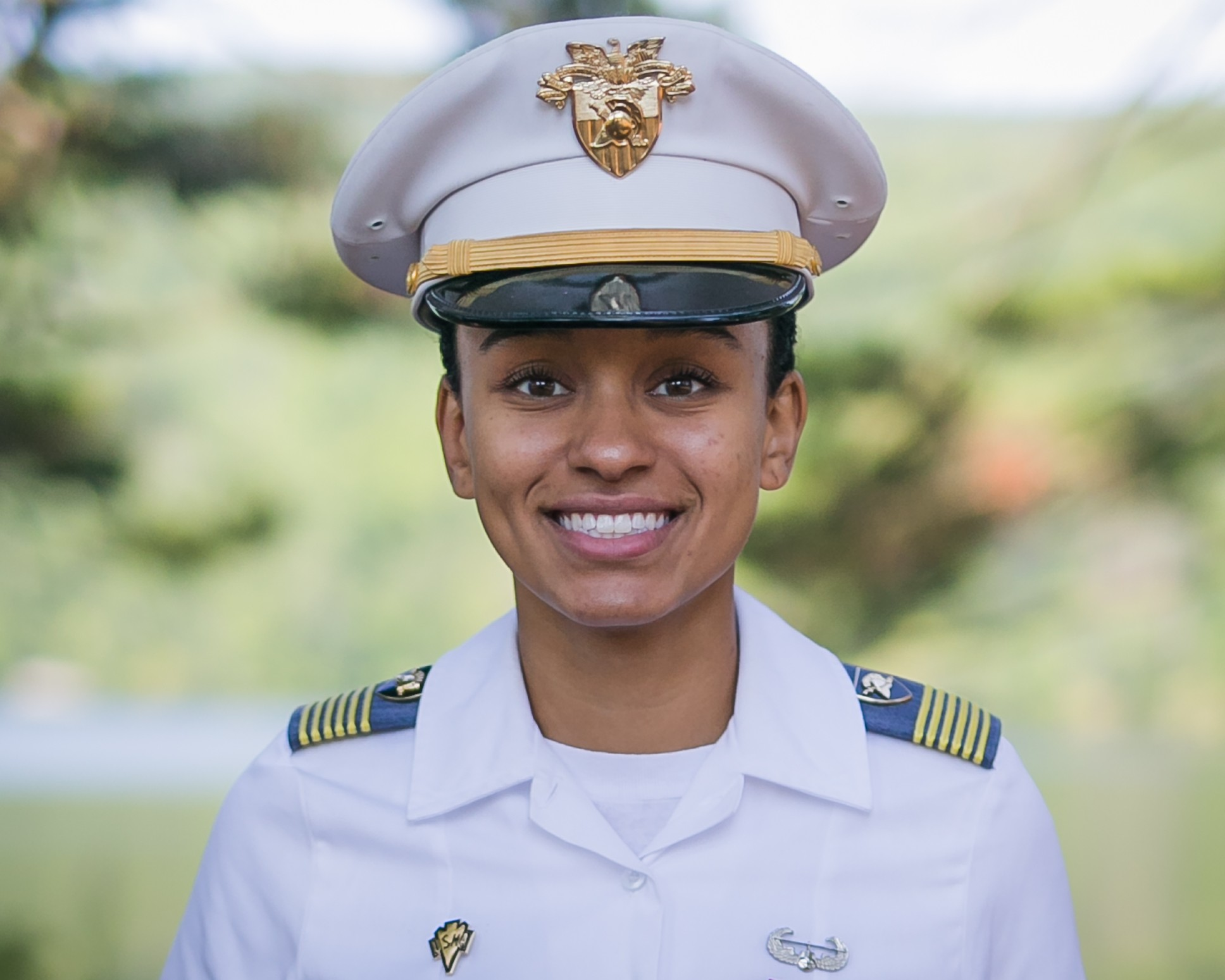
Askew, c. 2014

Simone Marie Askew is a captain in the United States Army. In 2017, she became the first African American woman to achieve the rank of First Captain, leader of the Corps of Cadets. This was regarded as a major step in racial and gender equality within the United States military. She was graduated from West Point in 2018 with a Bachelor of Science degree in international studies and environmental engineering.

She was also named by Glamour magazine as one of the top 10 College Women of the Year.

Askew is a 2014 graduate of Fairfax High School in Virginia. She was granted a Rhodes Scholarship in 2017. Askew earned a MSc with merit in refugee and forced migration studies from the Refugee Studies Centre in 2019, and is currently pursuing MPP from the Blavatnik School of Government at University of Oxford.
