= Marshall S. Roth =

United States Air Force general

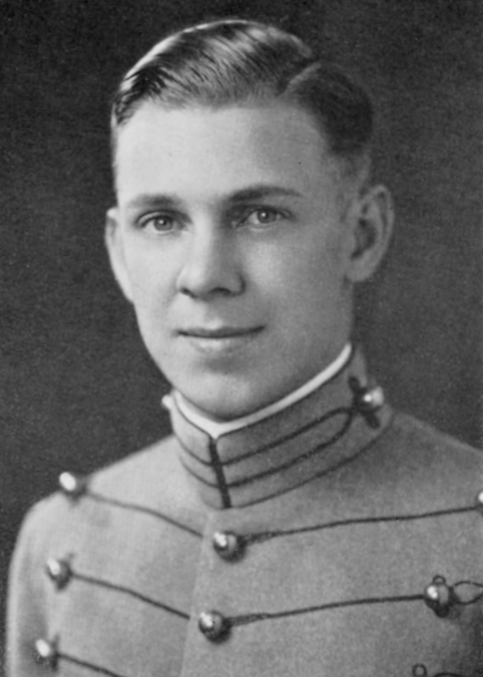
- As a West Point cadet
- Born: Marshall Stanley Roth; April 18, 1904; Chicago, Illinois, US
- Died: January 3, 1995 (aged 90); Colorado Springs, Colorado, US
- Education: Northwestern Military and Naval Academy; United States Military Academy
- Occupation: Military officer
- Spouse: Martha Rathje (m. 1931)
- Awards: Legion of Merit

Marshall Stanley Roth (April 18, 1904 – January 3, 1995) was a major general in the United States Air Force.

== Biography ==
Roth was born in Chicago, Illinois on April 18, 1904. He married Martha Rathje on September 18, 1931. He died in Colorado Springs on January 3, 1995.

== Career ==
Roth graduated from the Northwestern Military and Naval Academy in 1925 and the United States Military Academy in 1929. During World War II he served with the Eighth Air Force, the Fifth Air Force, the Fourteenth Air Force, the Tenth Air Force, the Ninth Air Force, and the Fifteenth Air Force. Following the war he was given command of the 375th Troop Carrier Group and the 317th Troop Carrier Group. In 1948 he entered the National War College. Later in his career he served as Chief of Staff of Air Defense Command. His retirement was effective as of July 31, 1967.

Awards he received include the Legion of Merit.
