= List of Romanian military equipment of World War II =

This is a list of World War II military equipment used by Romania.

== Local equipment ==
This includes only locally designed and produced equipment.

=== Combat vehicles ===
==== Aircraft ====
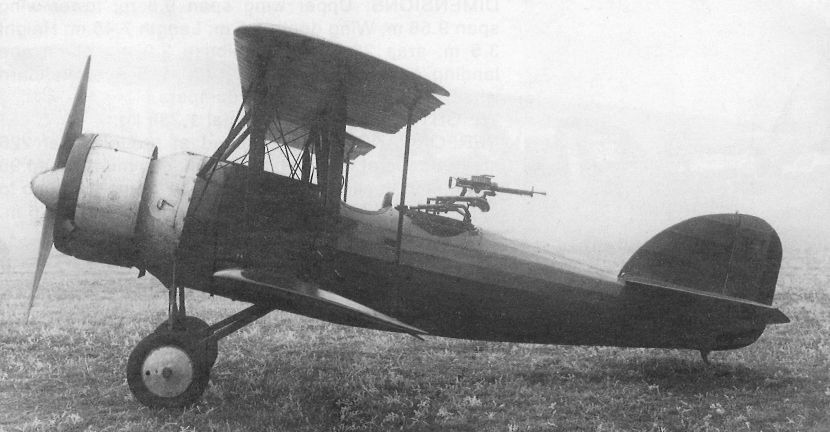
SET 7K

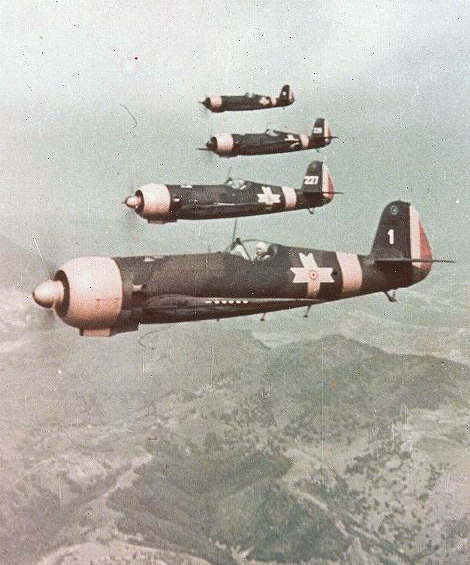
IAR 80 formation

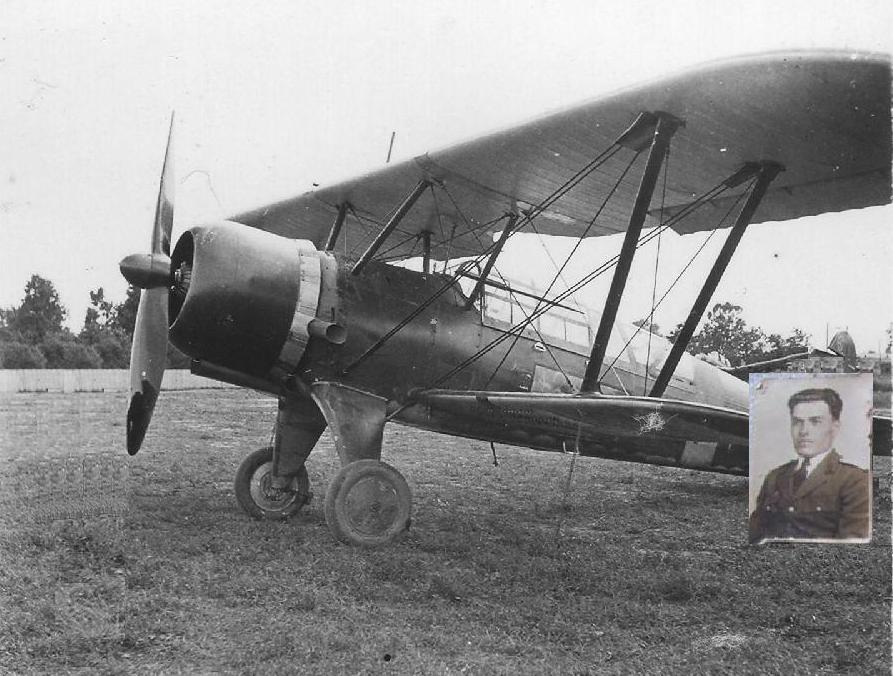
IAR 37

All of the aircraft listed below were completed before the end of World War II. Prototypes are omitted from the list. Unless specified otherwise, all aircraft machine guns have the caliber of 7.92 mm. All of the data is sourced from:

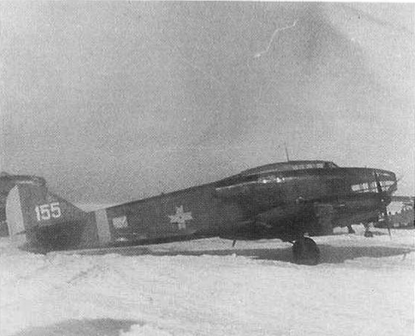
JRS-79B

Model	Type	Number	Armament
SET 7K	Training, communication, observation	20	2 x Lewis guns (twin mount)
SET 7KB	Reconnaissance and observation	20	2 x Lewis guns (twin mount); 1 x Vickers machine gun 6 x 12 kg bombs
SET 7KD	Communication	20	1 x Lewis gun
IAR 37	Light bomber	50	4 x Browning machine guns 12 x 50 kg bombs
IAR 38	Reconnaissance and artillery spotting	75	3 x Browning machine guns 24 x 12 kg bombs
IAR 39	Reconnaissance and light bomber	255	3 x Browning machine guns 24 x 12 kg bombs
IAR 80	Fighter	49	4 x FN Browning machine guns
IAR 80A	Fighter	85	6 x FN Browning machine guns
IAR 80B	Fighter	55	2 x 13.2 mm FN Browning heavy machine guns 4 x FN Browning machine guns
IAR 80C	Fighter	60	2 x 20 mm Ikaria autocannons 4 x FN Browning machine guns
IAR 81	Fighter and dive bomber	50	6 x FN Browning machine guns (4 for 10 of them); 2 x 13.2 mm FN Browning heavy machine gun (10 of them); 1 x 225 bomb 2 x 50 kg bombs
IAR 81C	Fighter	150	2 x 20 mm MG 151 autocannons 2 x FN Browning machine guns Werfer-Granate 21 (1)
JRS-79B	Bomber	36	5 x machine guns 1,575 kg of bombs
JRS-79B1	Bomber	31	1 x 20 mm Ikaria autocannon 7 x machine guns 1,400 kg of bombs

==== Armored fighting vehicles ====
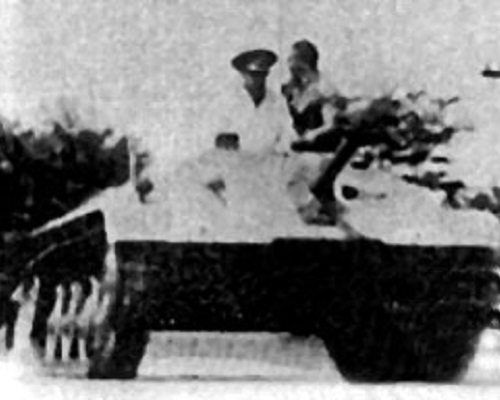
Mareșal prototype

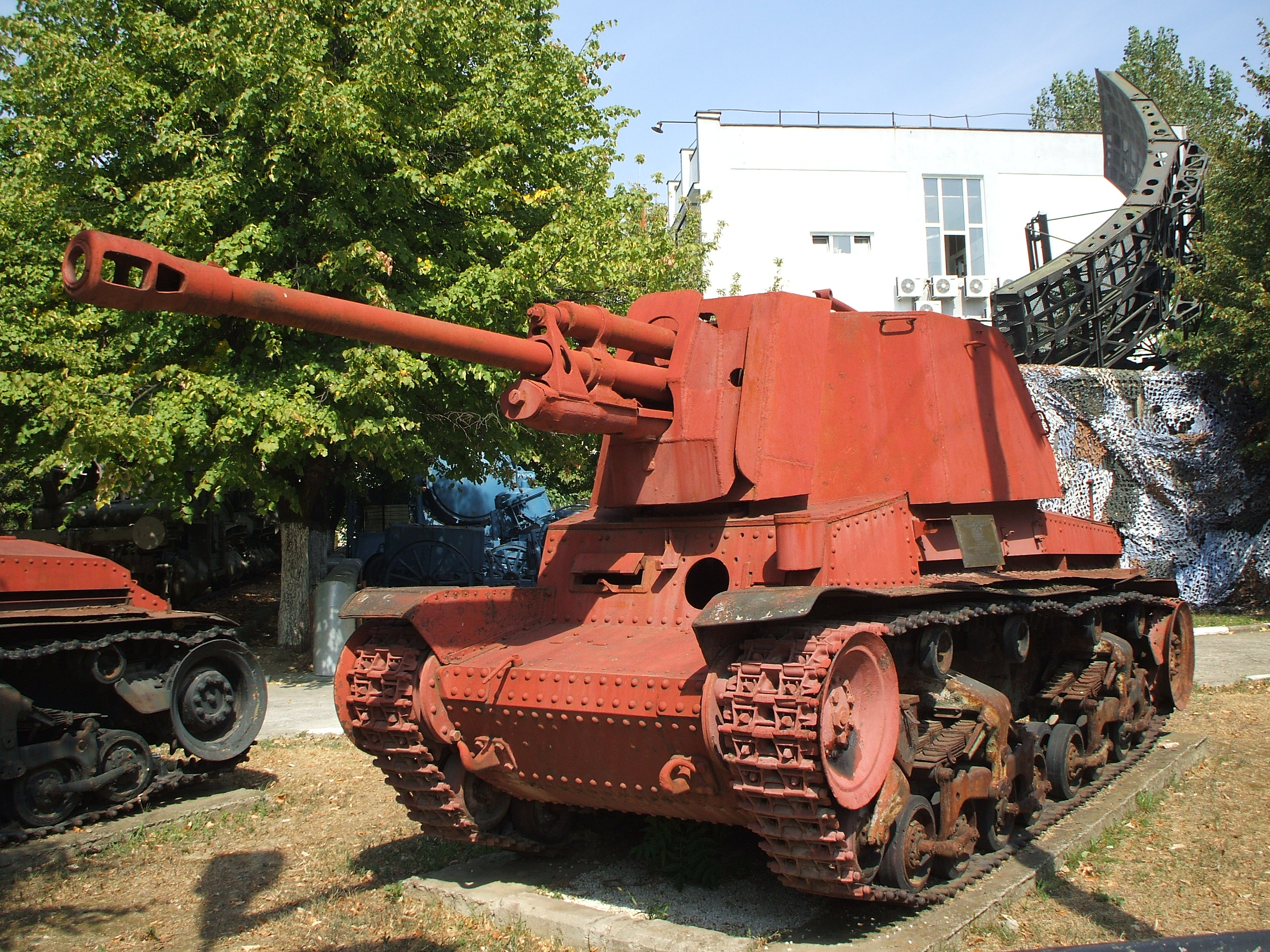
TACAM R-2

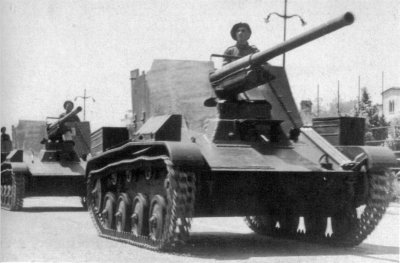
TACAM T-60

All of the data is sourced from:

Model	Type	Number	Armament
TACAM T-60	Tank destroyer	34 converted from captured T-60s	1 x 76.2 mm M-1936 F-22; 1 x 7.92 mm ZB-53 machine gun 1 x submachine gun
TACAM R-2	Tank destroyer	21 converted from Panzer 35(t)s	1 x 76.2 mm M-1936 F-22 (1); 1 x 76.2 mm ZIS-3 (20); 1 x 7.92 mm ZB-53 machine gun
Vânătorul de care R35	Tank destroyer/light tank	30 converted from R35s	1 x 45 mm 20K mod. 1932–34 tank gun
Mareșal	Tank destroyer	6 prototypes	1 x 122 mm M1910/30 howitzer (4); 1 x 75 mm DT-UDR (2); 1 x 7.92 mm ZB-53 machine gun

==== Warships ====
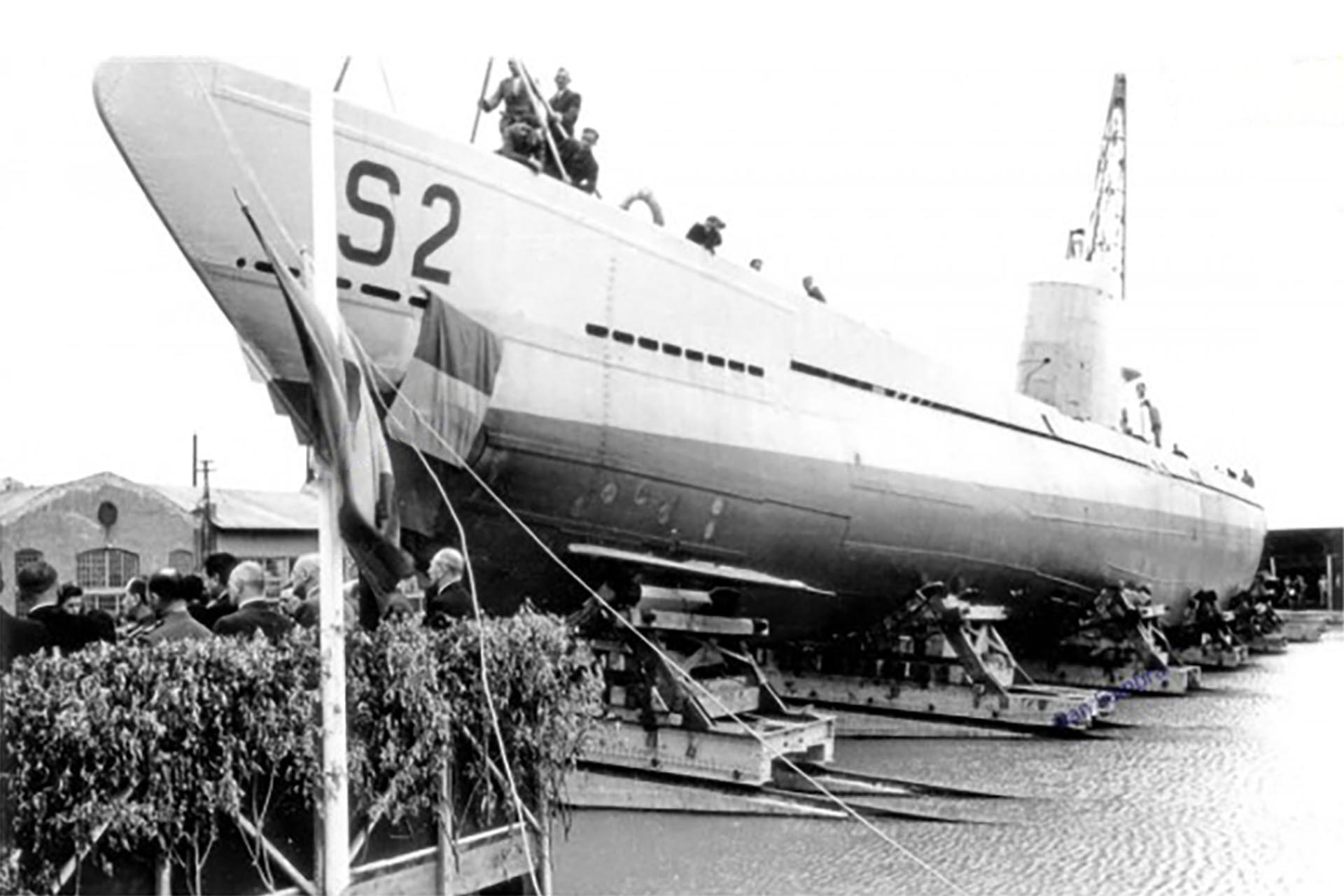
The launching of Marsuinul

Data for the monitors sourced from: and for the rest of the warships from:

Class	Type	Ships	Armament (artillery, torpedoes, mines)
Brătianu-class	River monitor	Ion C. Brătianu Alexandru Lahovari Lascăr Catargiu Mihail Kogălniceanu	3 x 120 mm naval guns 1 x 76 mm AA gun 2 x 47 mm light naval guns
Amiral Murgescu	Minelayer and escort	Amiral Murgescu	2 x 105 mm naval/AA guns 2 x 37 mm AA guns 4 x 20 mm AA guns 135 x mines
Marsuinul	Submarine	Marsuinul	1 x 105 mm deck gun 1 x 37 mm AA gun 6 x 533 mm torpedo tubes
Rechinul	Submarine	Rechinul	1 x 20 mm AA; 4 x 533 mm torpedo tubes 40 x mines

=== Individual weapons ===
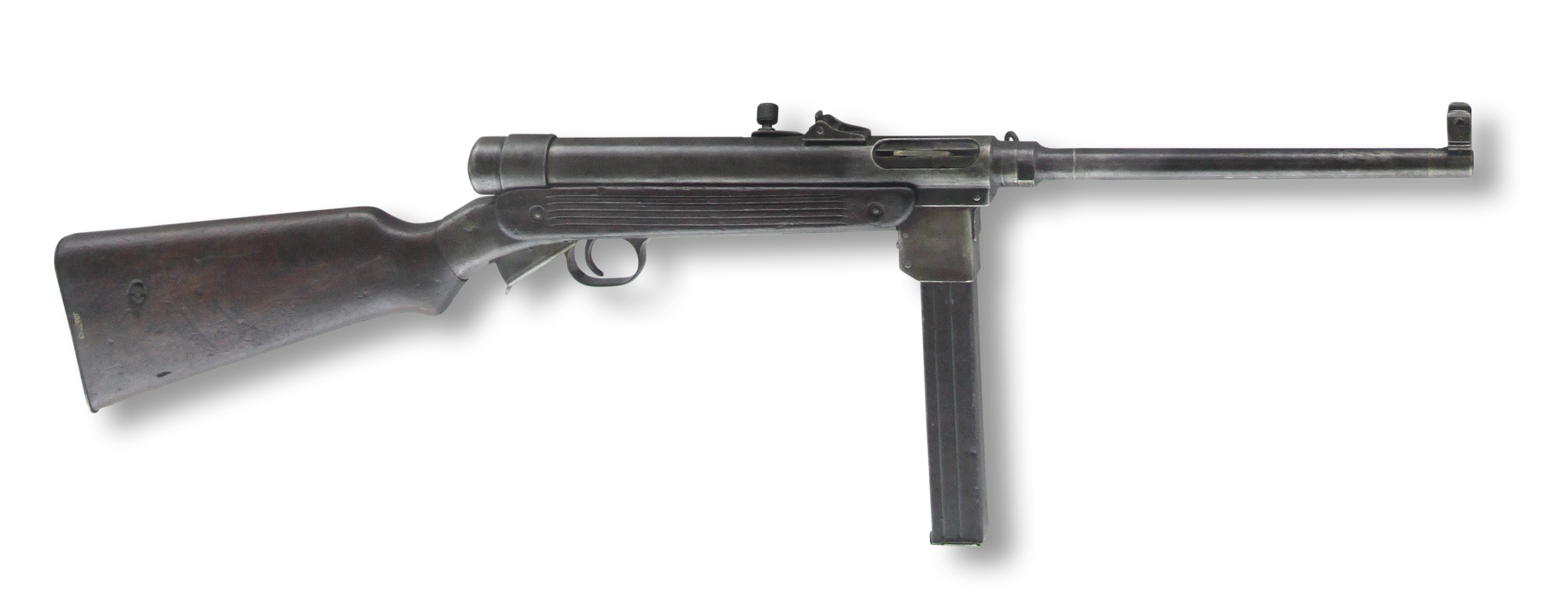
Orița M1941

Model	Type	Number	Notes
Orița M1941	submachine gun	6,000	Number produced until October 1943
Argeș	flamethrower		
15.2 mm Model 1943	anti-tank rifle	1	Prototype made in 1943

=== Artillery ===
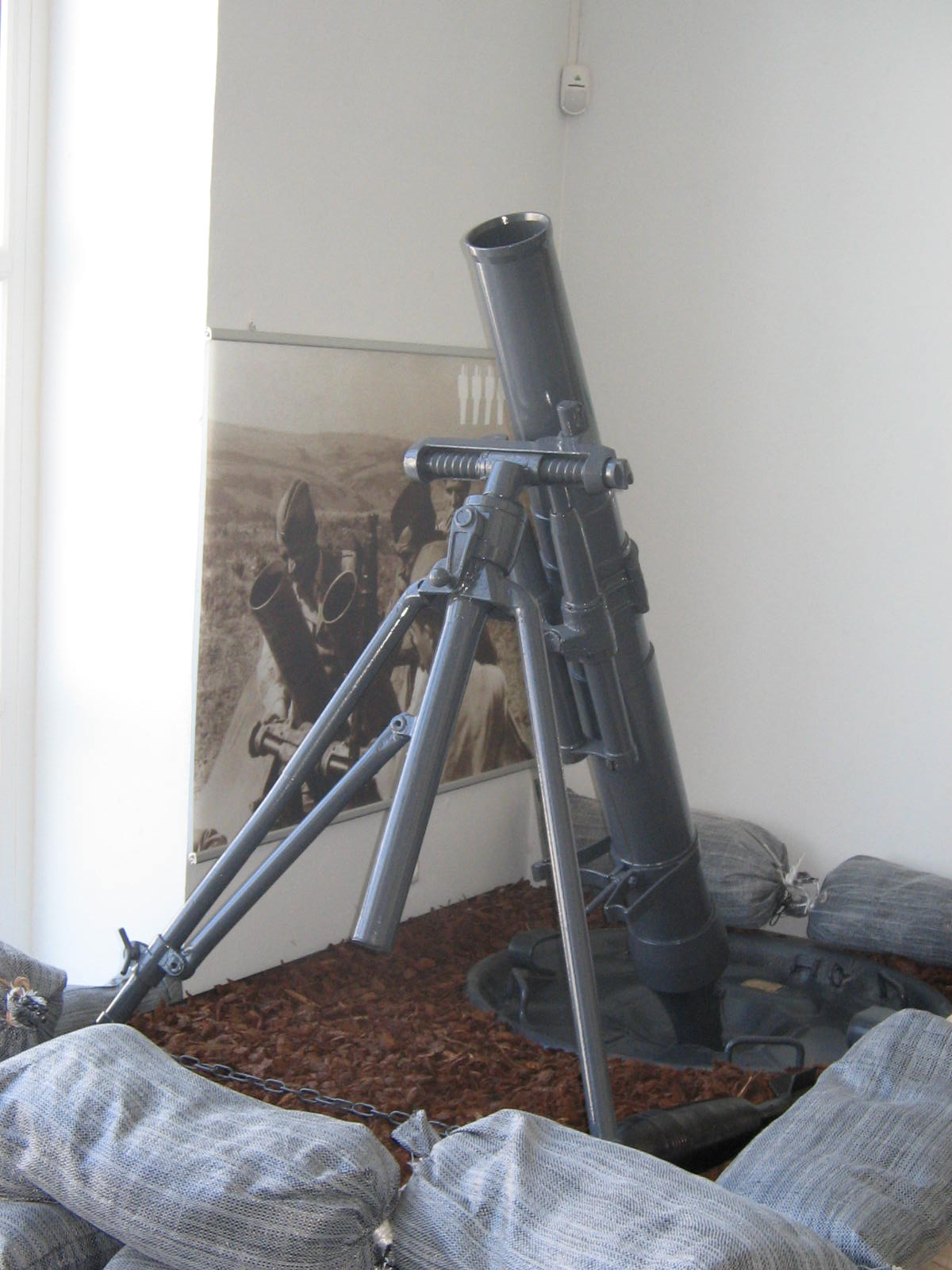
Reșița Model 1942 mortar

Model	Type	Number	Notes
75 mm Reșița Model 1943	field/anti-tank gun	375	Number produced until December 1944 (including 3 prototypes)
120 mm Reșița Model 1942	mortar	12+	Number produced until 1944

=== Other ===
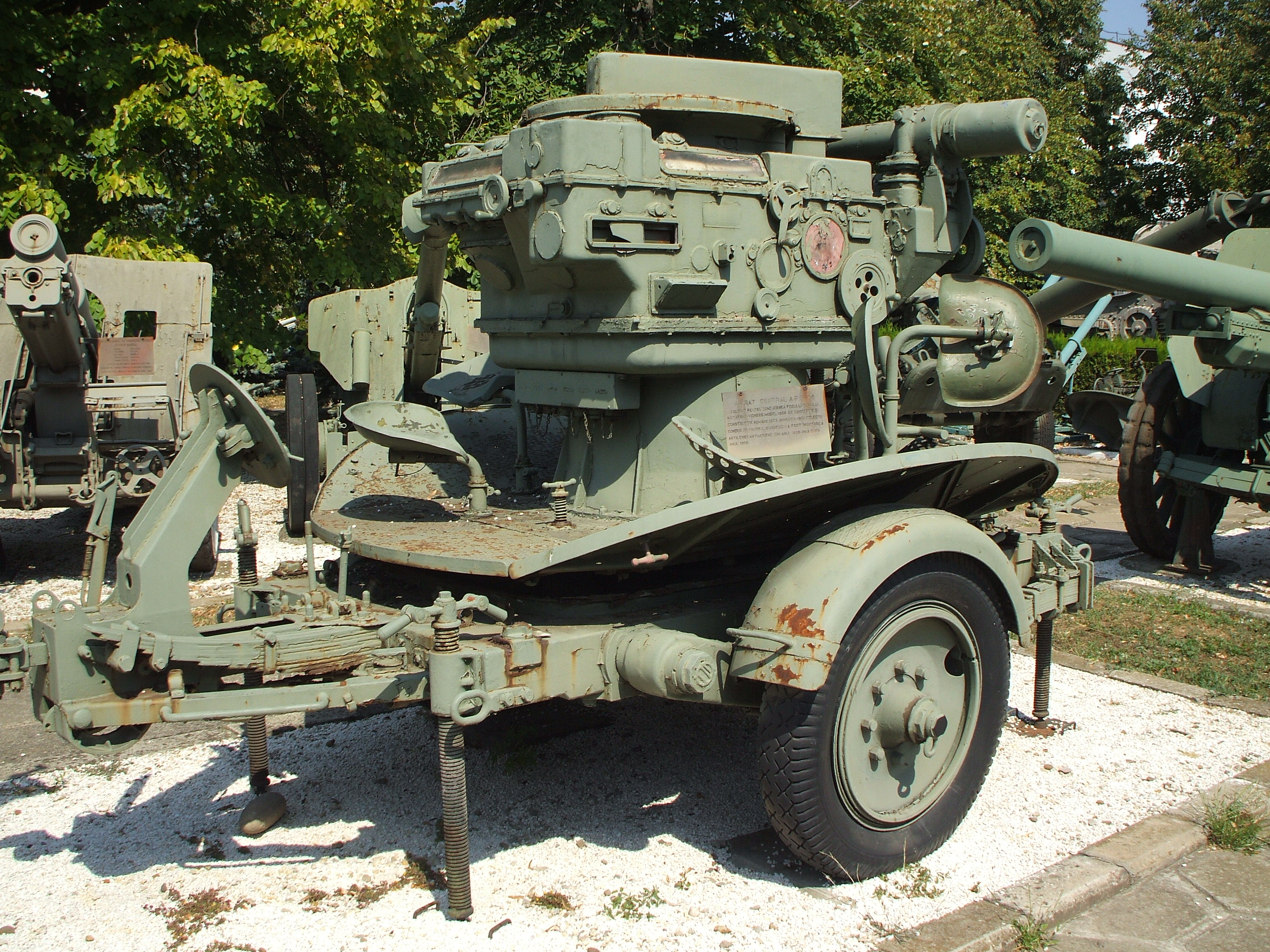
Bungescu fire director

- Bungescu AA fire director
- Costinescu 6.6 kg 75 mm armor-piercing shell
- T-1 tractor – 5 prototypes

=== Table of orders and deliveries for the land forces ===
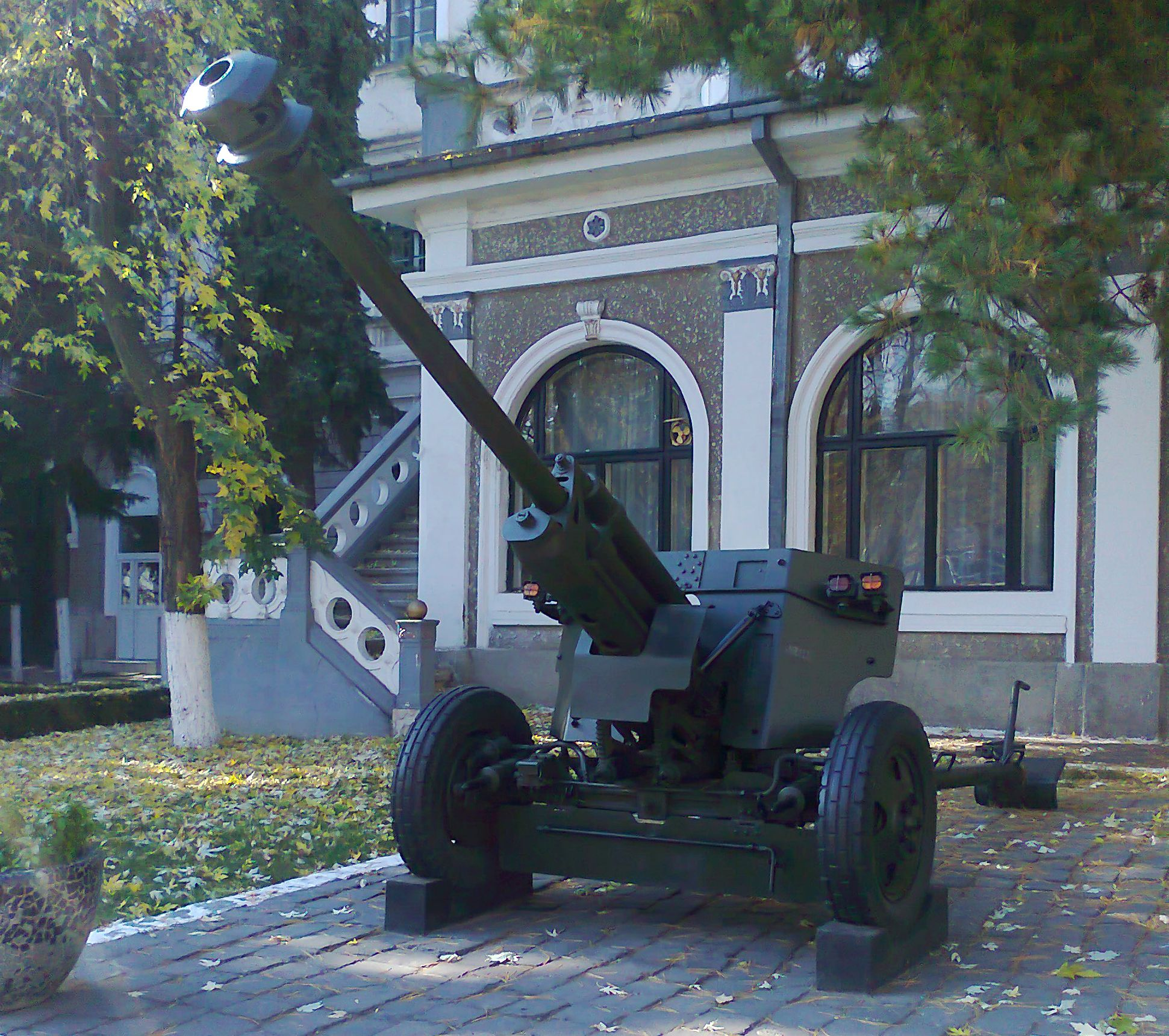
75 mm Reșița Model 1943

Data from:

Model	Type	Numbers ordered	Numbers produced	Percentage produced from the order
Orița M1941	Submachine gun	45,000	6,000 (Oct. 1943)	13.3%
75 mm Reșița Model 1943	Field/anti-tank gun	1,100	375 (Dec. 1944)	34%
Malaxa UE carrier	Artillery tractor	300	126	42%
TACAM T-60	Tank destroyer	34	34 converted	100%
TACAM R-2	Tank destroyer	40	21 converted	52.5%
Vânătorul de care R35	Tank destroyer/light tank	30	30 converted	100%
Mareșal	Tank destroyer	1,000	6 prototypes	0.6%
T-1 tractor	Artillery tractor	1,000	5 prototypes	0.5%

== Foreign equipment ==
This includes equipment produced in other countries as well as license production.

=== Combat vehicles ===
==== Aircraft ====
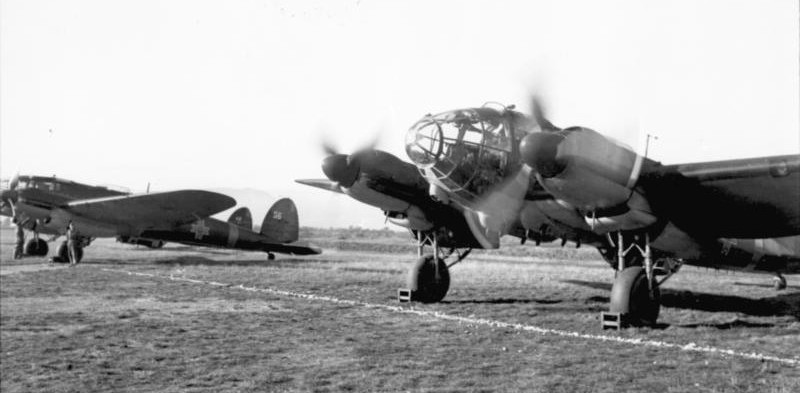
He 111H

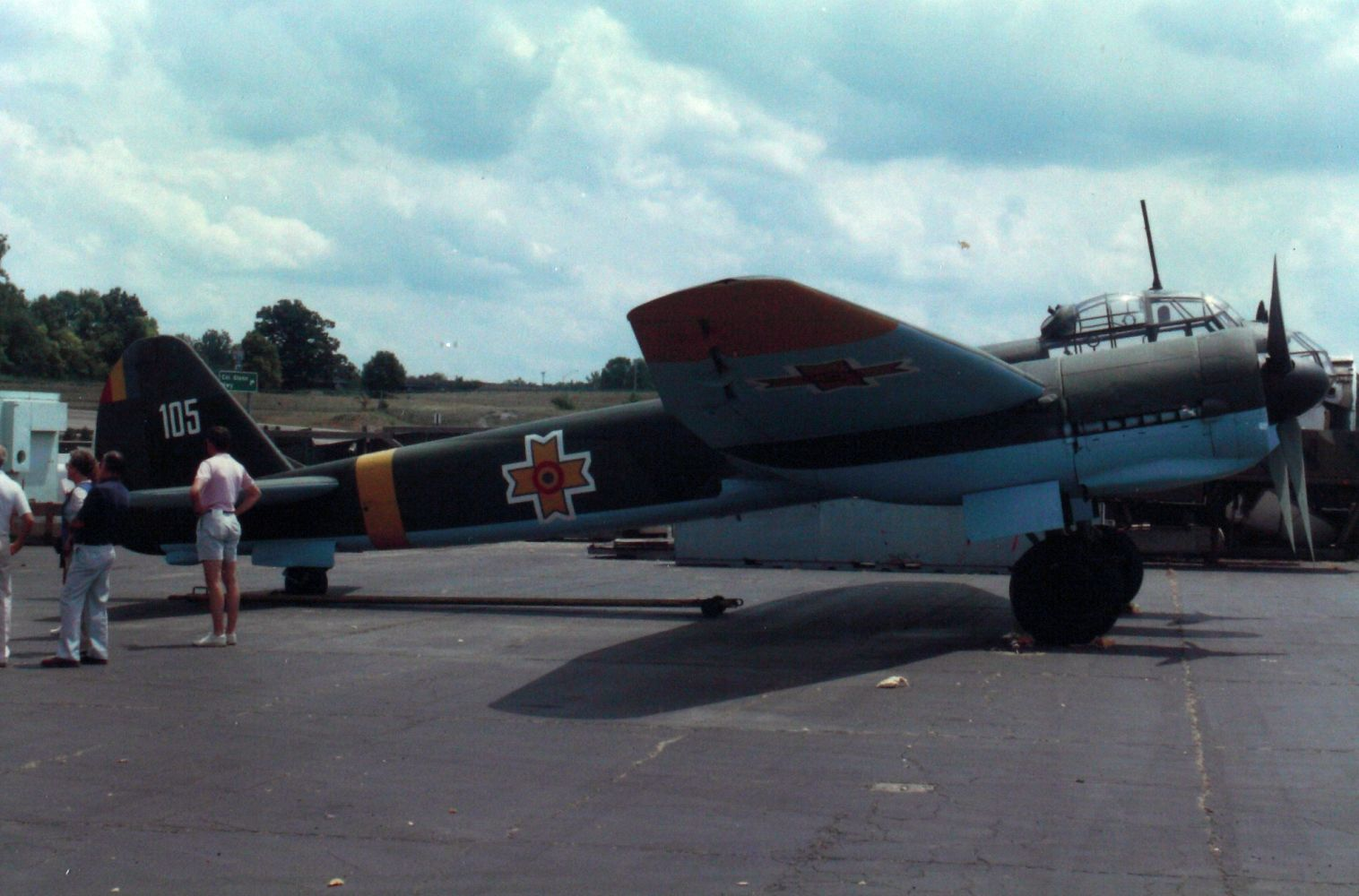
Ju 88D

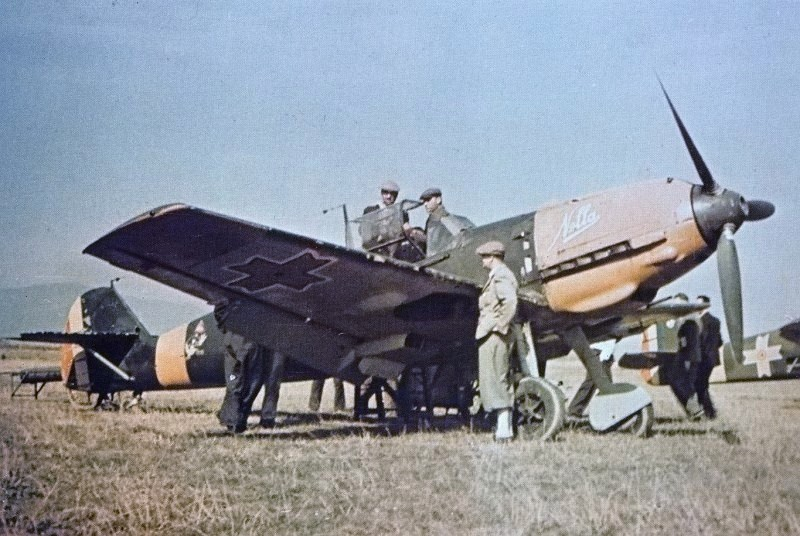
Bf 109E

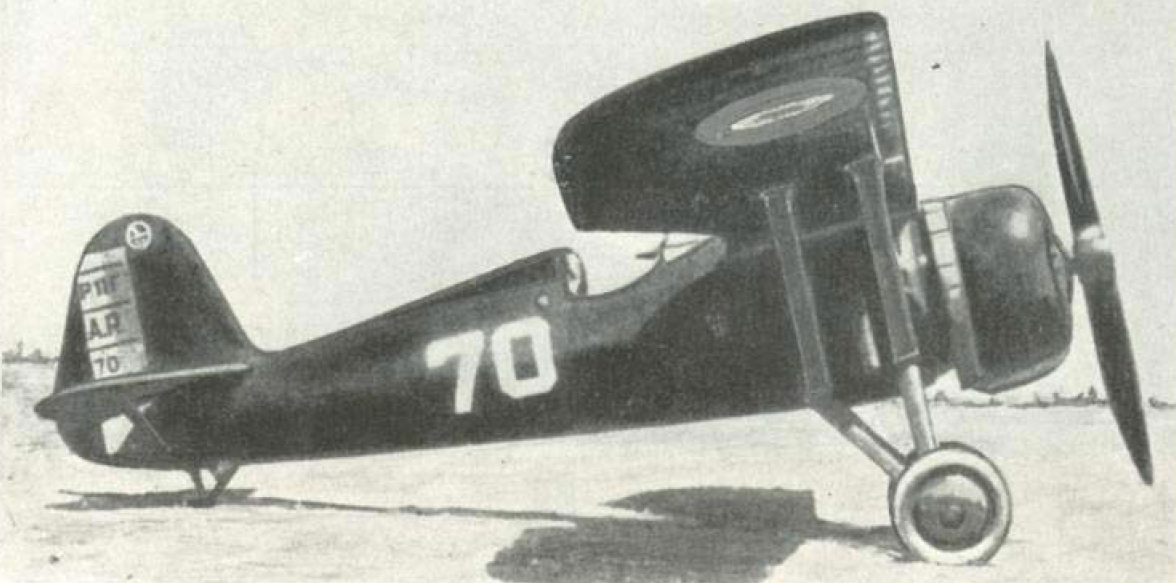
IAR-produced PZL P.11f

Model	Type	Number	Notes
Bloch MB.210	Medium bomber	10	Purchased from France
Bristol Blenheim Mk. I	Light bomber/reconnaissance	40	Purchased from the United Kingdom. Three ex-Yugoslav aircraft bought from Germany.
Dornier Do 17M	Reconnaissance/bomber	10	Purchased from Germany
Focke-Wulf Fw 189A-2	Reconnaissance	2	Purchased from Germany
Focke-Wulf Fw 58	Transport/Trainer	34	Purchased from Germany
Hawker Hurricane Mk. I	Fighter	15	Purchased from the United Kingdom. Three ex-Yugoslav aircraft bought from Germany.
Heinkel He 111E	Bomber	10	Purchased from Germany
Heinkel He 111H	Bomber	42	Purchased from Germany
Heinkel He 112B-1/B-2	Fighter	30	Purchased from Germany
Henschel Hs 129B-2	Attack	40+	Purchased from Germany
Junkers Ju 86E	Reconnaissance	12	Purchased from Germany
Junkers Ju 87D-3/D-5	Dive bomber	90+	Purchased from Germany
Junkers Ju 88A	Bomber	69+	Purchased from Germany
Junkers Ju 88D	Reconnaissance	19+	Purchased from Germany
Messerschmitt Bf 109E	Fighter	69	Purchased from Germany
Messerschmitt Bf 109F	Fighter	7	Purchased from Germany
Messerschmitt Bf 109G	Fighter	200+	Purchased from Germany, also assembled locally
Messerschmitt Bf 110C	Night fighter/heavy fighter	12	Purchased from Germany
Messerschmitt Bf 110E	Night fighter/heavy fighter	2	Purchased from Germany
Messerschmitt Bf 110F	Night fighter/heavy fighter	9	Purchased from Germany
Potez 543	Bomber	10	Purchased from France
Potez 631 & 633	Reconnaissance/bomber	53	Ex-French aircraft received from Germany
PZL P.11b	Fighter	50	Purchased from Poland
PZL P.11f	Fighter	95	Purchased from Poland, also produced under license
PZL P.24E	Fighter	30	Purchased from Poland, also produced under license
Savoia-Marchetti SM.79B	Bomber	24	Purchased from Italy

==== Armored fighting vehicles ====
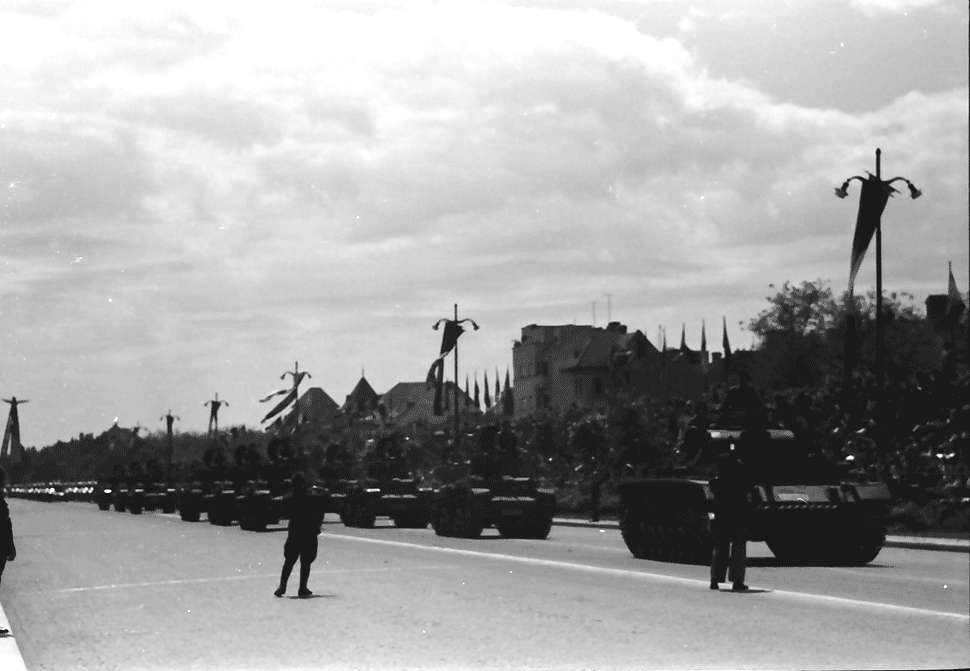
Column of R-2s led by a T-3

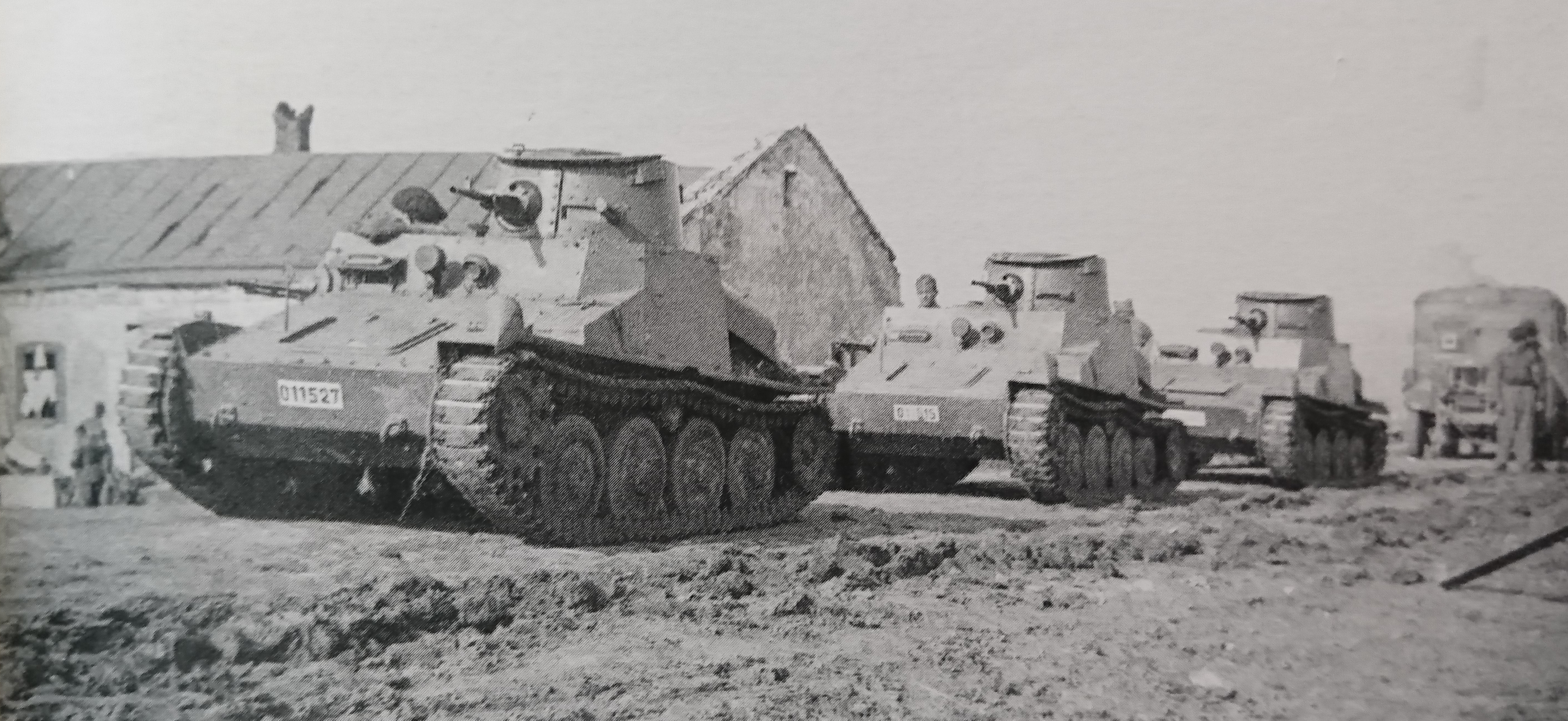
R-1 tanks

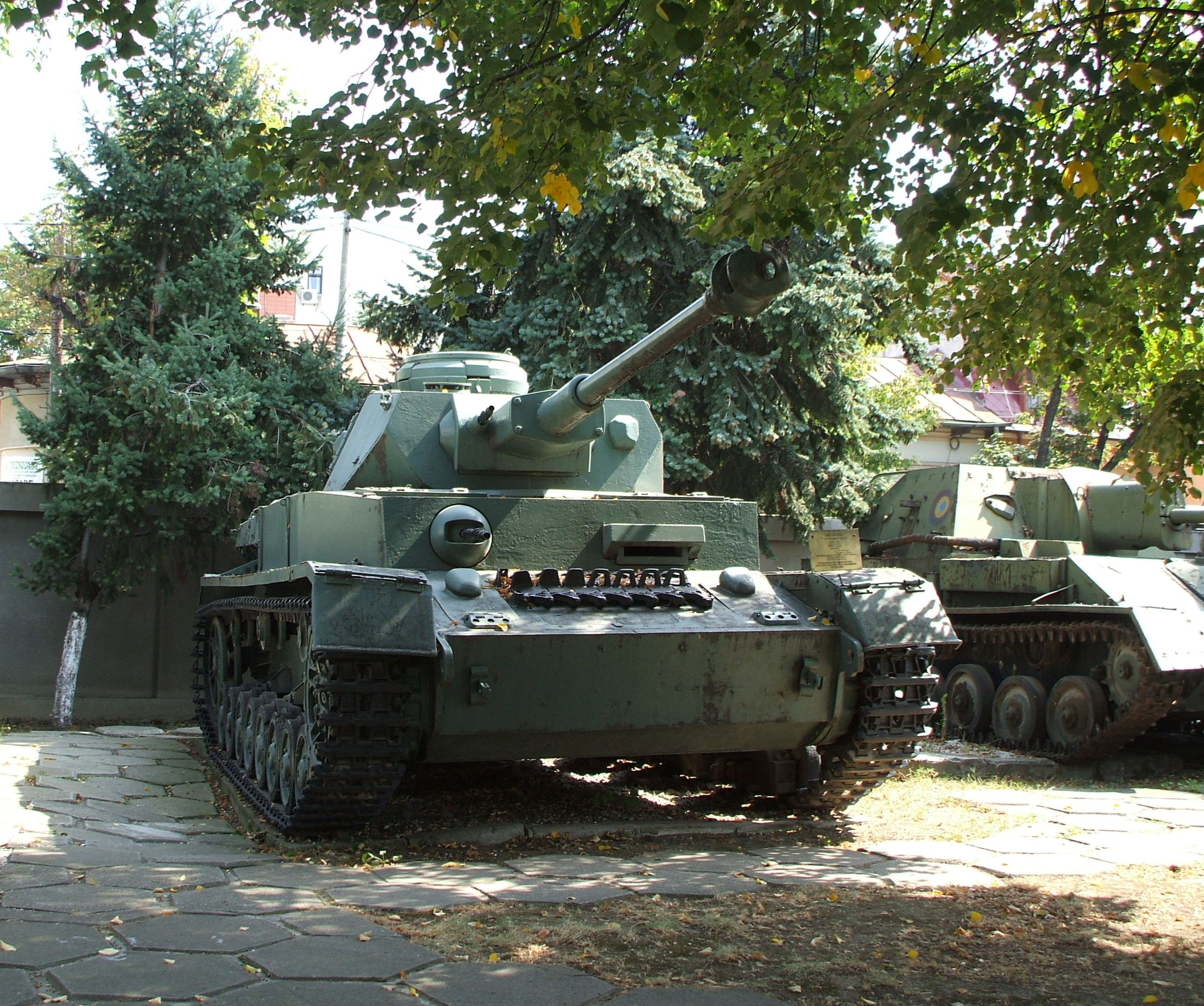
T-4 (J variant)

Data is sourced from:

Model	Type	Number	Notes
Tanks and tankettes
Renault FT	Light tank	78	Purchased from France in 1919
R-1	Light tank/tankette	36	Modified Czech AH-IV
R-2	Light tank	152	Purchased from Czechoslovakia, later received from Germany as well.
Renault R35	Light tank	75	Purchased from France, 34 interned from Poland
T-3	Medium tank	12	Designation for the German Panzer III, Panzer III Ausf. N used
T-4	Medium tank	141+	Designation for the German Panzer IV, Panzer IV Ausf. G, H and J used. Some supplied by the USSR after August 1944 as well.
T-38	Light tank	75	Designation for the Czechoslovak LT vz. 38 (German Panzer 38(t)), received from Germany
Assault guns
TAs	Assault gun	104+	Designation for the German Sturmgeschütz III. Some supplied by the USSR after August 1944 as well.
Armored cars
Autoblinda AB41	Armored car	8	Italian armored cars purchased from Germany
Sd.Kfz. 222	Armored car	50+	Received from Germany
Sd.Kfz. 250	Half-track armoured personnel carrier	28+	Received from Germany.
Sd.Kfz. 251	Half-track armoured personnel carrier	Unknown	Received from Germany. At least one Sd.Kfz. 251/9 with a 7.5 cm gun also used.

==== Captured armored fighting vehicles ====
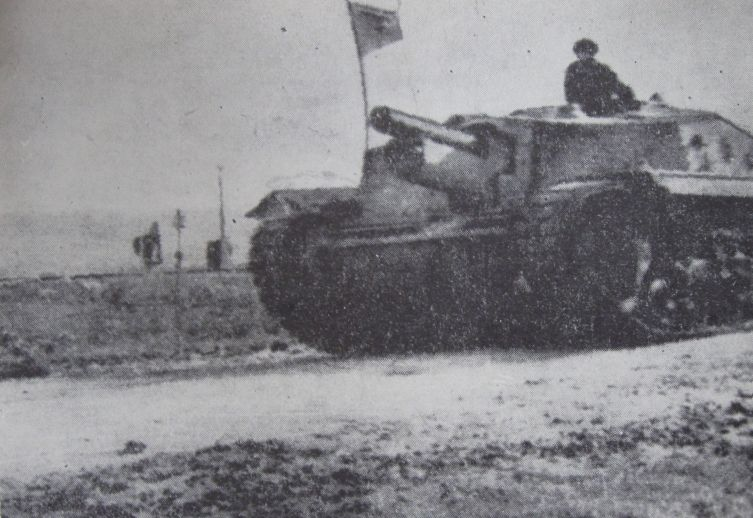
Romanian captured Zrínyi assault gun

Data sourced from:

Model	Type	Origin	Number	Notes
Tanks and tankettes
T-27	Tankette	USSR	2	Captured in 1941
TKS	Tankette	Poland	52	Interned in October 1939
BT-7	Light cavalry tank	USSR	32	Captured in 1941
M3A1 Stuart	Light tank	United States	21+	Captured from the USSR
Panzer II	Light tank	Germany	2	Captured in late August 1944
T-26	Light tank	USSR	33	Captured in 1941
T-37A	Amphibious light tank	USSR	19+	Captured in 1941
T-38	Amphibious light tank	USSR	3+	Captured in 1941
T-40	Amphibious light tank	USSR	1	At least one captured
T-60	Light tank	USSR	30+	Captured in 1941
38M Toldi	Light tank	Hungary	Unknown	Some captured in 1944. Reported as unserviceable.
M3 Lee	Medium tank	United States	4	Captured from the USSR
T-28	Medium tank	USSR	2+	Several captured in 1941, two still in service by November 1942
T-34	Medium tank	USSR	6+	Several captured, two reported in service in 1942 and a further four captured in 1944. All T-34/76 models.
40M Turán	Medium tank	Hungary	Unknown	Some captured in 1944. Reported as unserviceable.
Valentine Mk. III	Infantry tank	United Kingdom	4	Captured from the USSR
Vickers	Infantry tank	United Kingdom	19	Unspecified "Vickers" tanks captured from the USSR
IS-2	Heavy tank	USSR	1	Captured in the summer of 1944
KV-1	Heavy tank	USSR	2	One captured in 1942, another in 1944
Tiger I	Heavy tank	Germany	2	Captured in late August 1944
Tank destroyers
Hetzer	Tank destroyer	Germany	2	Captured in the fall of 1944
Assault guns
ISU-152	Assault gun	USSR	1	Captured in the summer of 1944
43M Zrínyi	Assault gun	Hungary	1	Captured in the fall of 1944
Armored cars
BA-6; BA-10; BA-20; BA-27	Armored car	USSR	103+	Various Soviet BA series armored cars captured
OA vz. 27	Armored car	Czechoslovakia	3	Interned in March 1939
OA vz. 30	Armored car	Czechoslovak	10	Interned in March 1939

==== Warships ====
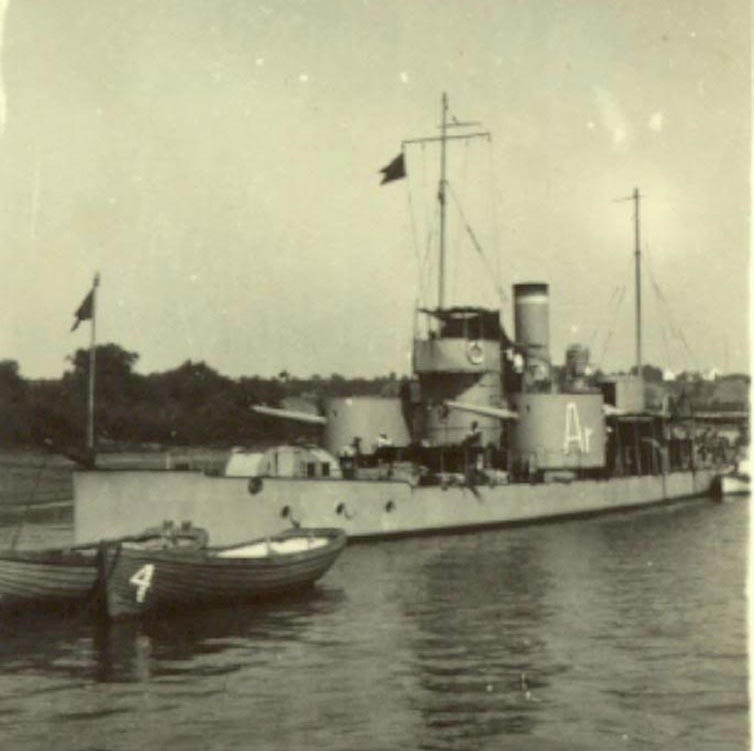
NMS Ardeal, interwar period

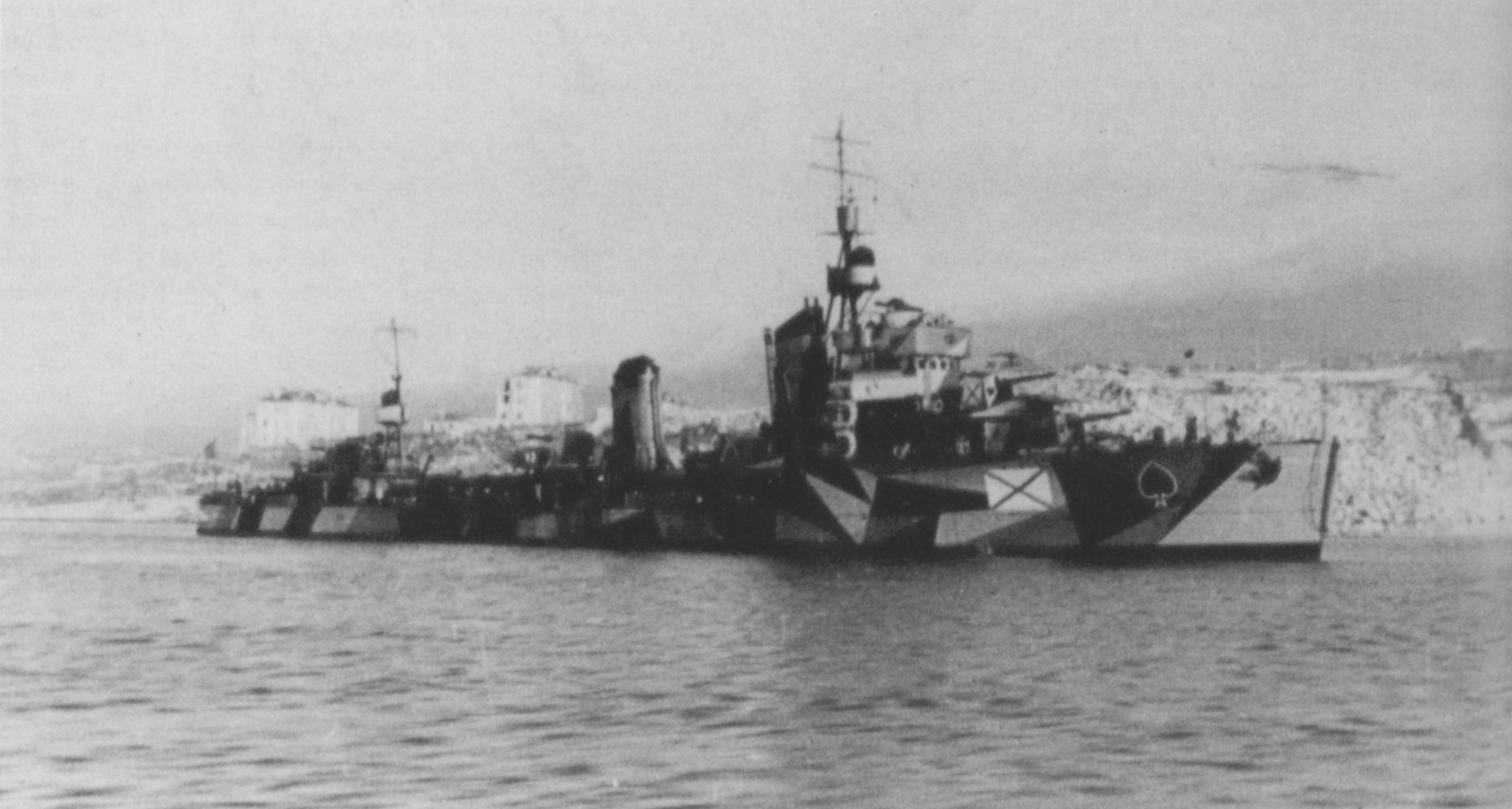
NMS Regina Maria in 1944

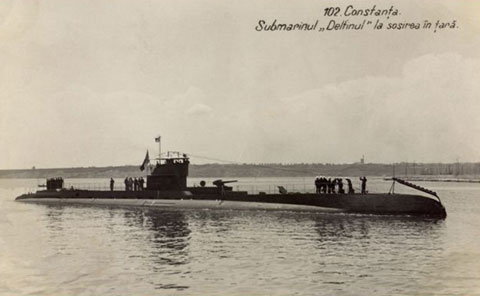
NMS Delfinul

Data sourced from:

Class	Type	Ships	Notes
Regele Ferdinand-class	Destroyer	Regele Ferdinand Regina Maria	Built in Italy
Vifor-class	Destroyer	Mărăști Mărășești	Built in Italy
Friponne-class	Gunboat	Dumitrescu Ghiculescu Lepri Stihi	Built in France, purchased in 1920
Delfinul	Submarine	Delfinul	Built in Italy
CB-class	Midget submarine	CB-1 CB-2 CB-3 CB-4 CB-6	Built in Italy, received in 1943
Temes-class	River monitor	Ardeal	Ex-SMS Temes
Enns-class	River monitor	Basarabia	Ex-SMS Inn
Sava-class	River monitor	Bucovina	Ex-SMS Sava

=== Individual weapons ===
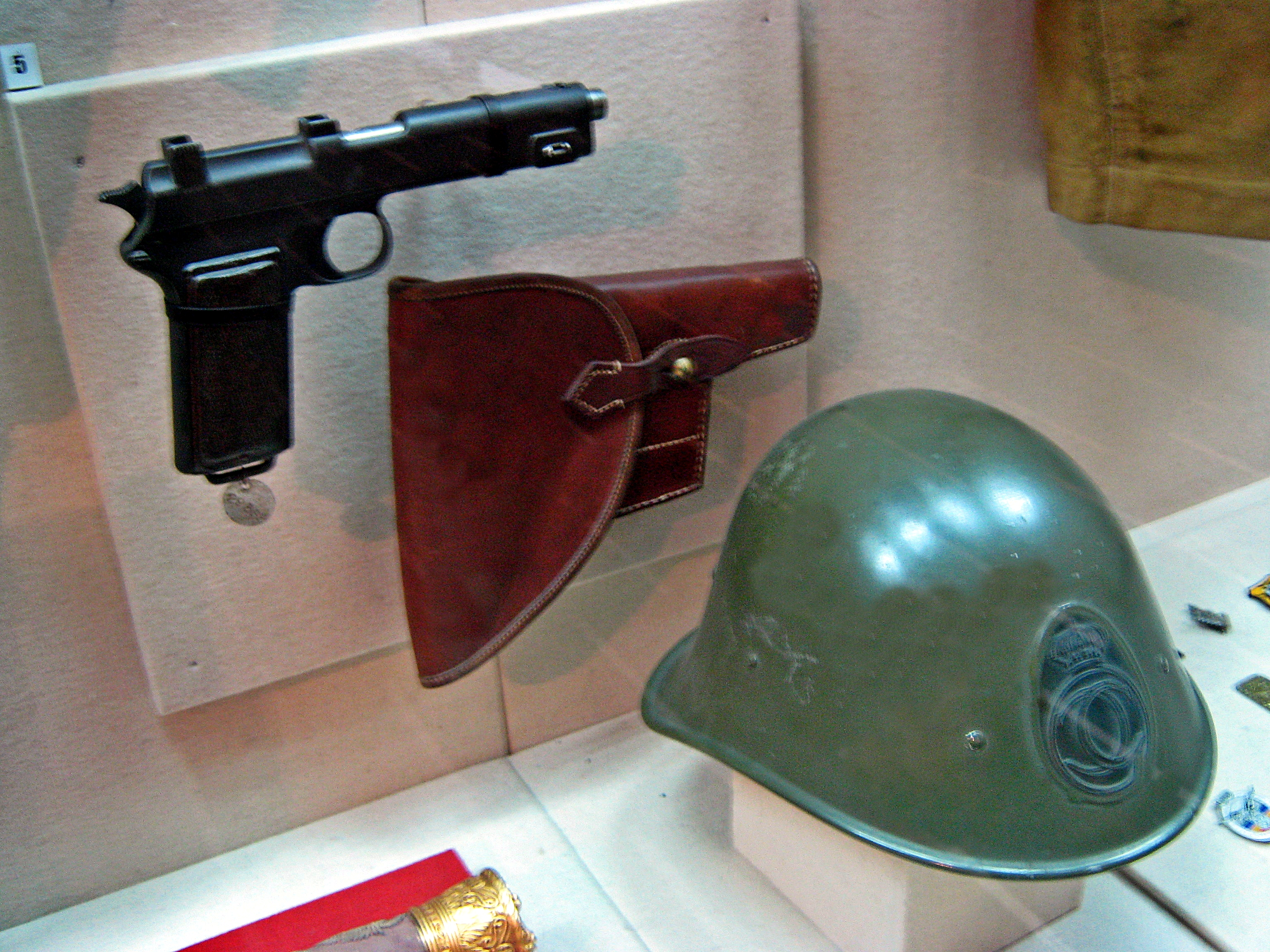
Steyr M1912 pistol displayed next to an M39 Helmet

Data sourced from:

Model	Image	Caliber	Origin	Notes
Pistols and revolvers
Beretta M1934		9mm Scurt	Italy	
Walther PP		7.65mm Browning	Germany	
Walther PPK		7.65mm Browning	Germany	
Walther P38		9mm Parabellum	Germany	
Luger Model 1908		9mm Parabellum	Germany	
Steyr M1912		9mm Steyr	Austria-Hungary	
Browning Model 1910/22		9mm Scurt	Belgium	Designation for the FN Model 1910
TT pistol		7.62mm Tokarev	USSR	
Nagant M1895		7.62×38mmR	Russia	
Rifles
ZB rifle		7.92mm Mauser	Czechoslovakia	Designation for the vz. 24 rifle. Standard service rifle.
Mauser Model 1898		7.92mm Mauser	Germany	Designation for the Gewehr 98
Karabiner 98k		7.92mm Mauser	Germany	27,000 received from Germany in 1943
Mannlicher M1893		6.5×53mmR	Austria-Hungary	Reserve use
Mannlicher M1895		8mm Mannlicher	Austria-Hungary	Reserve use
Mosin-Nagant Model 1891/30		7.62×54mmR	Russia	Also modified locally into carbines
Assault rifles
StG 44		7.92mm Kurz	Germany	Also designated MP 43
Submachine guns
Beretta Model 38		9mm Parabellum	Italy	Model 38A and 38/42 used
MP 18		9mm Parabellum	Germany	Designated as Pistolul mitralieră Schmeisser Model 18 I
MP 28		9mm Parabellum	Germany	Designated as Pistolul mitralieră Schmeisser Model 28 II
MP 40		9mm Parabellum	Germany	Designated as Pistolul mitralieră Schmeisser Model 1940
MP 41		9mm Parabellum	Germany	Designated as Pistolul mitralieră Schmeisser Model 1941
Mauser C96		7.63mm Mauser	Germany	Designated as Pistolul mitralieră Mauser
PPD-40		7.62mm Tokarev	USSR	
PPSh-41		7.62mm Tokarev	USSR	
PPS-43		7.62mm Tokarev	USSR	
Light machine guns
ZB vz. 30		7.92mm Mauser	Czechoslovakia/Romania	Standard light machine gun, also produced under license
MG 34		7.92mm Mauser	Germany	
MG 42		7.92mm Mauser	Germany	
DP machine gun		7.62×54mmR	USSR	
Heavy machine guns
ZB-53		7.92mm Mauser	Czechoslovakia	Standard heavy machine gun
Schwarzlose machine gun		8mm Mannlicher 7.92mm Mauser	Austria-Hungary	Both original 8mm caliber and in 7.92mm Mauser local conversion. Also used in anti-aircraft role.
Ckm wz. 30		7.92×57mm	Poland	Imported through the Sepewe company before the war.
Maxim Model 1910		7.62×54mmR	Russia	
M1895 Colt–Browning		7.62×54mmR	USA	
Flamethrowers
Pignone Model 1937		–	Italy	
Flammenwerfer 35		–	Germany	
Mittlerer Flammenwerfer 39		–	Germany	
Anti-tank weapons
Panzerfaust		–	Germany	
Panzerschreck		88mm	Germany	

=== Artillery ===
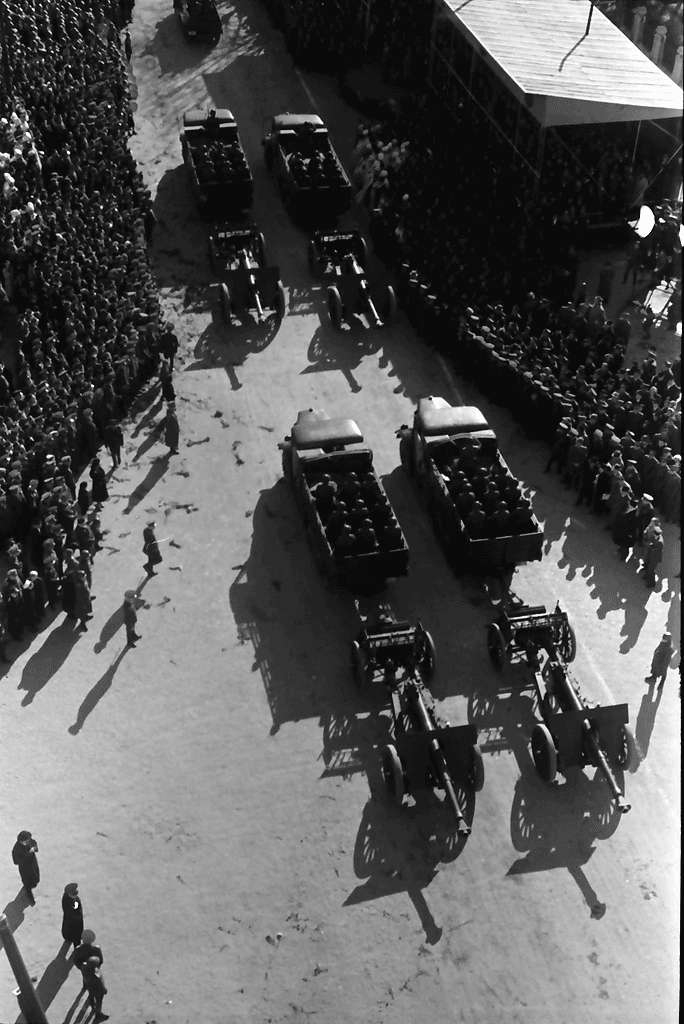
105mm Schneider 1936 guns towed by Škoda trucks

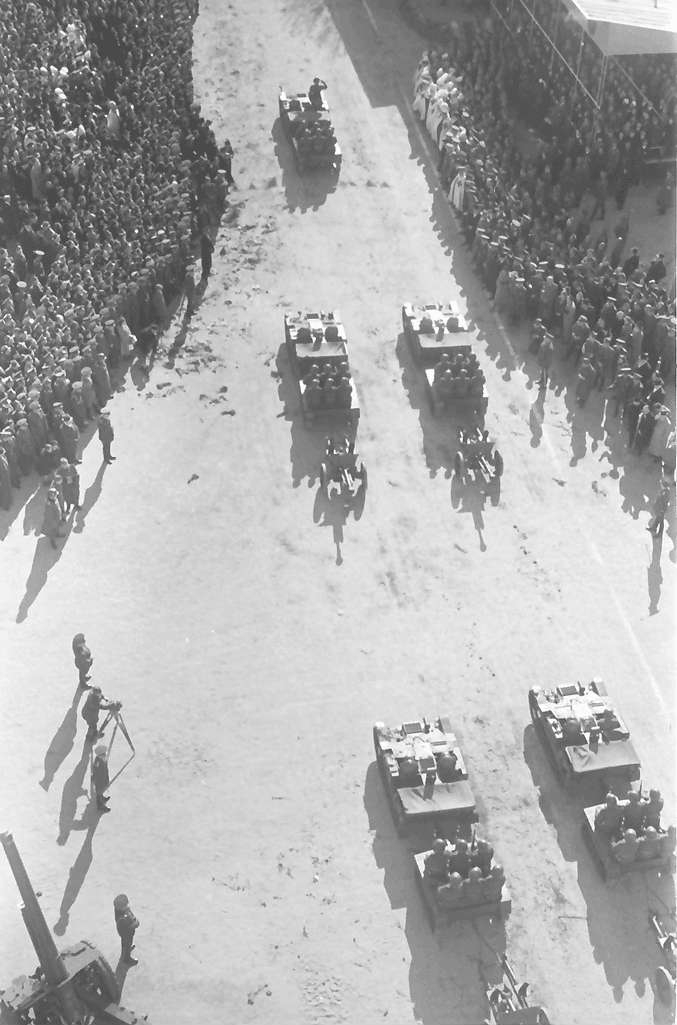
47mm Schneider M1936 guns towed by Malaxa UE carriers

Data sourced from:

Model	Image	Caliber	Origin	Notes
Mortars
Brandt Mle 1935		60mm	France/Romania	Also produced under license at the Voina Works in Brașov
Brandt Mle 27/31		81mm	France/Romania	Produced under license at the Voina Works in Brașov
Anti-tank guns
Puteaux Model 1937		25mm	France	
Bofors Model 1936		37mm	Sweden/Poland	More than 556 guns purchased from Germany
M-42		45mm	USSR	Both captured and supplied by the USSR
Breda Model 1935		47mm	Austria/Italy	
Böhler Model 1935		47mm	Austria	
Schneider M1936		47mm	France/Romania	Purchased from France, also produced under license
Pak 38		50mm	Germany	
Pak 97/38		75mm	Germany	
Pak 40		75mm	Germany	
Field guns
Putilov 1902/36		75mm	Russia	WW1-era guns refurbished at the Reșița Works
Krupp Model 1903		75mm	Germany	WW1-era gun
Puteaux Model 1897		75mm	France	WW1-era guns refurbished at the Reșița Works
Škoda Model 1928		75mm	Czechoslovakia	
Škoda Model 1915		104mm	Austria-Hungary	14 guns taken after WW1
Schneider Model 1913		105mm	France	32 guns purchased in 1940 from Germany
Schneider Model 1936		105mm	France	132 guns delivered before WW2.
Howitzers
Škoda Model 1914		100mm	Austria-Hungary	220 taken after WW1, 140 in service by the start of WW2
Škoda Model 1930/34		100mm	Czechoslovakia	62 batteries (248 pieces) purchased from Czechoslovakia in 1935.
Krupp Model 1898/1909		105mm	Germany	54 howitzers taken from Germany after WW1, refurbished in the 1930s to fire the Romanian Krupp shells.
Krupp Model 1912		105mm	Germany/Romania	WW1-era howitzer
Krupp Model 1916		105mm	Germany	64 howitzers taken from Germany after WW1
Krupp Model 1918/40		105mm	Germany	Received in 1943
Škoda Model 1914/16		150mm	Austria-Hungary	Taken after WW1, 24 in service at the start of WW2
Škoda Model 1934		150mm	Czechoslovakia	45 batteries (180 pieces) purchased from Czechoslovakia in 1935.
Mountain artillery
Škoda Model 1915		75mm	Austria-Hungary	72 guns in service at the start of WW2
Schneider Model 1902/04		76mm	France	WW1-era gun, refurbished in the 1930s
Schneider Model 1909		76mm	France	WW1-era gun, refurbished in the 1930s
Škoda Model 1916		100mm	Austria-Hungary	20 guns taken after WW1
Škoda Model 1939		105mm	Czechoslovakia	
Coastal artillery
152mm Armstrong gun		152mm	United Kingdom	Originally mounted on the Vifor-class destroyers, moved to the coastal artillery equipping the Tudor battery from Tataia, and the Aurora and Vlaicu batteries from Mangalia.
120mm Saint-Chamond gun		120mm	France	Originally mounted on the cruiser NMS Elisabeta, moved to the Elisabeta battery from Constanța.
152.4mm Obukhov Model 1904		152.4mm	Russia	Equipped the Mircea battery from Capu Midia and the Tudor battery from Tataia.
Cannone da 102/35		102mm	Italy	Used in both coastal artillery and anti-aircraft artillery roles.
Anti-aircraft artillery
Hotchkiss Model 1931		13.5mm	France	
Hotchkiss Model 1939		25mm	France	
Oerlikon 20 mm cannon		20mm	Switzerland	
Gustloff Model 1938		20mm	Germany	Designation for the Flak 30/38
Rheinmetall Model 1939		37mm	Germany/Romania	Designation for the Flak 36/37, produced under license at the Astra Works in Brașov.
Bofors Model 1930		40mm	Sweden	Delivered from Germany
Schneider Model 1897/17		75mm	France	WW1-era gun
Vickers Model 1931		75mm	United Kingdom/Romania	Produced under license by the Reșița Works
Škoda Model 1928		76.5mm	Czechoslovakia	
Krupp Model 1936		88mm	Germany	Designation for the Flak 36

=== Other ===
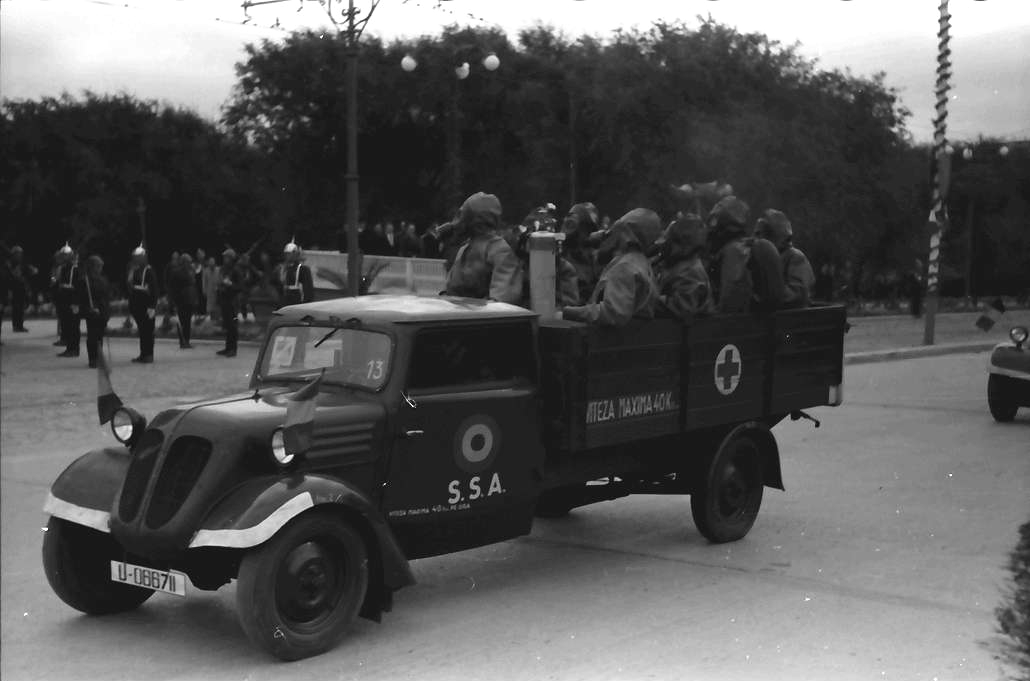
Tempo truck at a Romanian parade in Chișinău, 1942

Trucks

Model	Origin	Notes
Ford Marmon	United States/Romania	488 Marmon-Herrington trucks assembled by Ford Româna S.A.R.
Ford 3-ton	United States/Romania	2,320 trucks assembled by Ford Româna S.A.R. on the locally produced Fordson 157 chassis.
Henschel trucks	Germany	
Laffly S20	France	
Opel Blitz	Germany	
Praga RV	Czechoslovakia	
Škoda 6	Czechoslovakia	STP 6L and 6 ST 6T models
Tatra 93	Czechoslovakia	
Tempo trucks	Germany	

Half-tracks

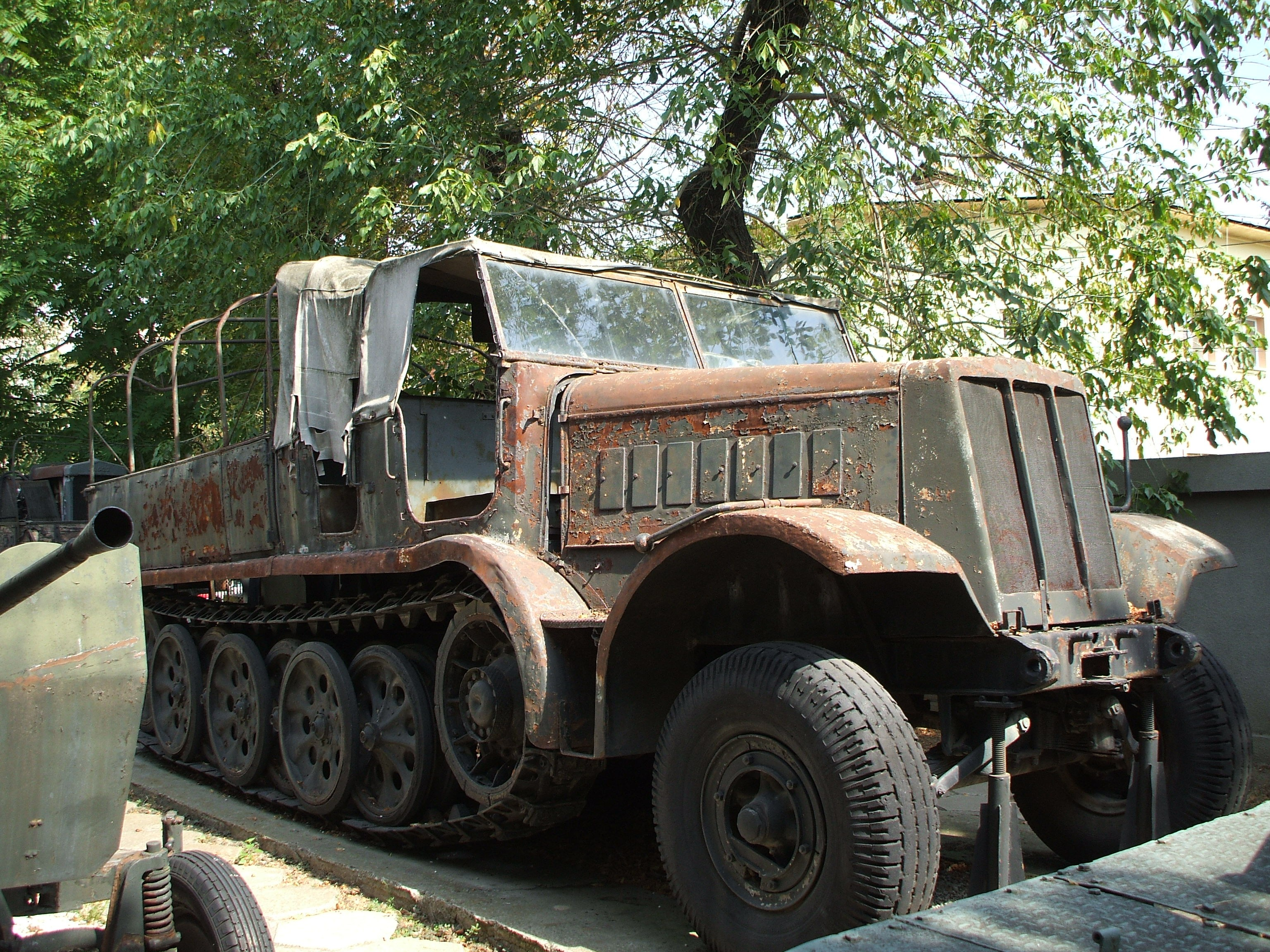
Sd.Kfz. 9 FAMO on display at the National Military Museum in Bucharest

Model	Origin	Number	Notes
Sd.Kfz. 9	Germany	Unknown	Supplied by Germany
Sd.Kfz. 10	Germany	9	Supplied by Germany for towing the Pak 38
Sd.Kfz. 11	Germany	9	Supplied by Germany for towing the Pak 40

Radars

Model	Image	Origin	Notes
Freya		Germany	3 radar stations operated by Serviciul general de Pândă si Alarmă
Würzburg		Germany	3 radar stations operated by Serviciul general de Pândă si Alarmă

== See also ==
- Arms industry in Romania
- Romanian armored fighting vehicle production during World War II
- Romanian military equipment of World War I

== Bibliography ==
- Axworthy, Mark (1995). Third Axis, Fourth Ally: Romanian Armed Forces in the European War, 1941–1945. London: Arms and Armour.
