= Romanian armored fighting vehicle production during World War II =

During the Second World War, the Kingdom of Romania produced, converted or significantly improved a variety of armored fighting vehicles, ranging from licence-built unarmed artillery tractors to tank destroyers of an original design which ended up - according to some accounts - as inspiration for some German AFV.

== Beginnings ==
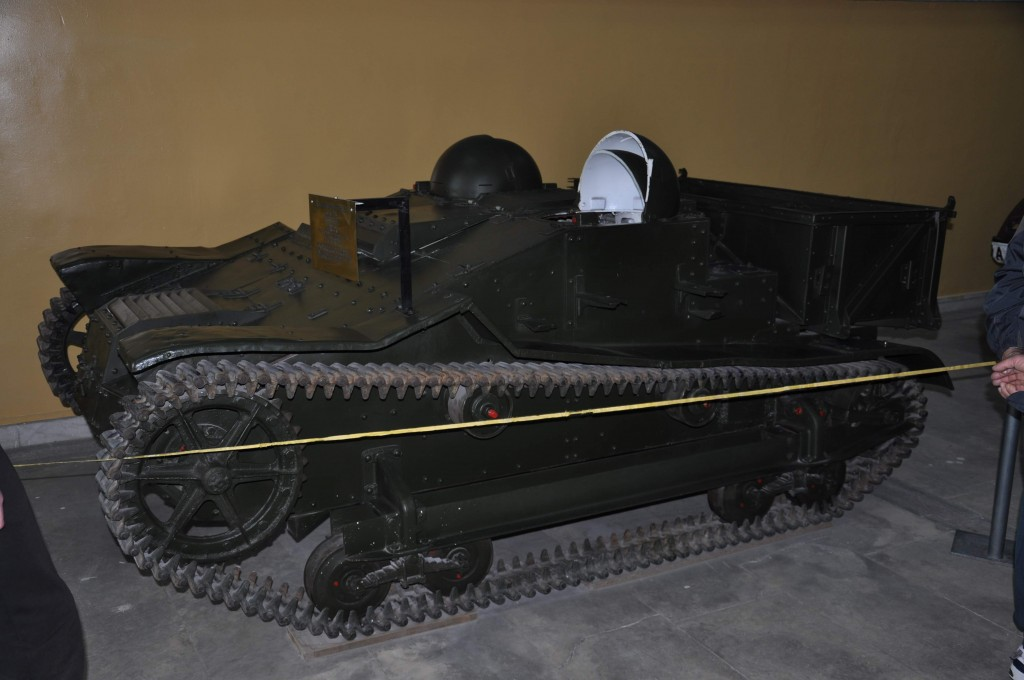
Romanian-built Malaxa UE carrier at the National Military Museum in Bucharest

Romania took its first step in developing an indigenous AFV industry in 1937, when a licence was acquired from France for the local production of 300 Renault UE armored tractors. It is worth noting that prior to this, not even repairs could be made in Romania, as the country had contracted Czechoslovakia for the repair of its increasingly obsolete and only partially operational fleet of 76 Renault FT-17 World War I-era light tanks. Production of the Renault UE was carried out in Romania between the latter half of 1939 and March 1941, but only 126 vehicles had been delivered. Although Malaxa, the Romanian Bucharest-based factory producing them, could manufacture most of the parts, it still relied on French imports for the engines, gearboxes and instrument panels, and thus production stopped along with the supply of imported parts following the fall of France. Nevertheless, the Romanian "Malaxa" tractors differed significantly from their French counterparts. They were heavier by 0.1 tons and their payload was increased from 0.35 to 0.5 tons. Thus, the 126 Romanian Malaxas had a cumulative payload equivalent to that of 180 French UEs.

The licence for the UE tractors was followed by one for the AH-IV tankette, acquired from Czechoslovakia. However, only one vehicle was produced by Malaxa under this licence.

== Repairs, improvements and production of parts ==
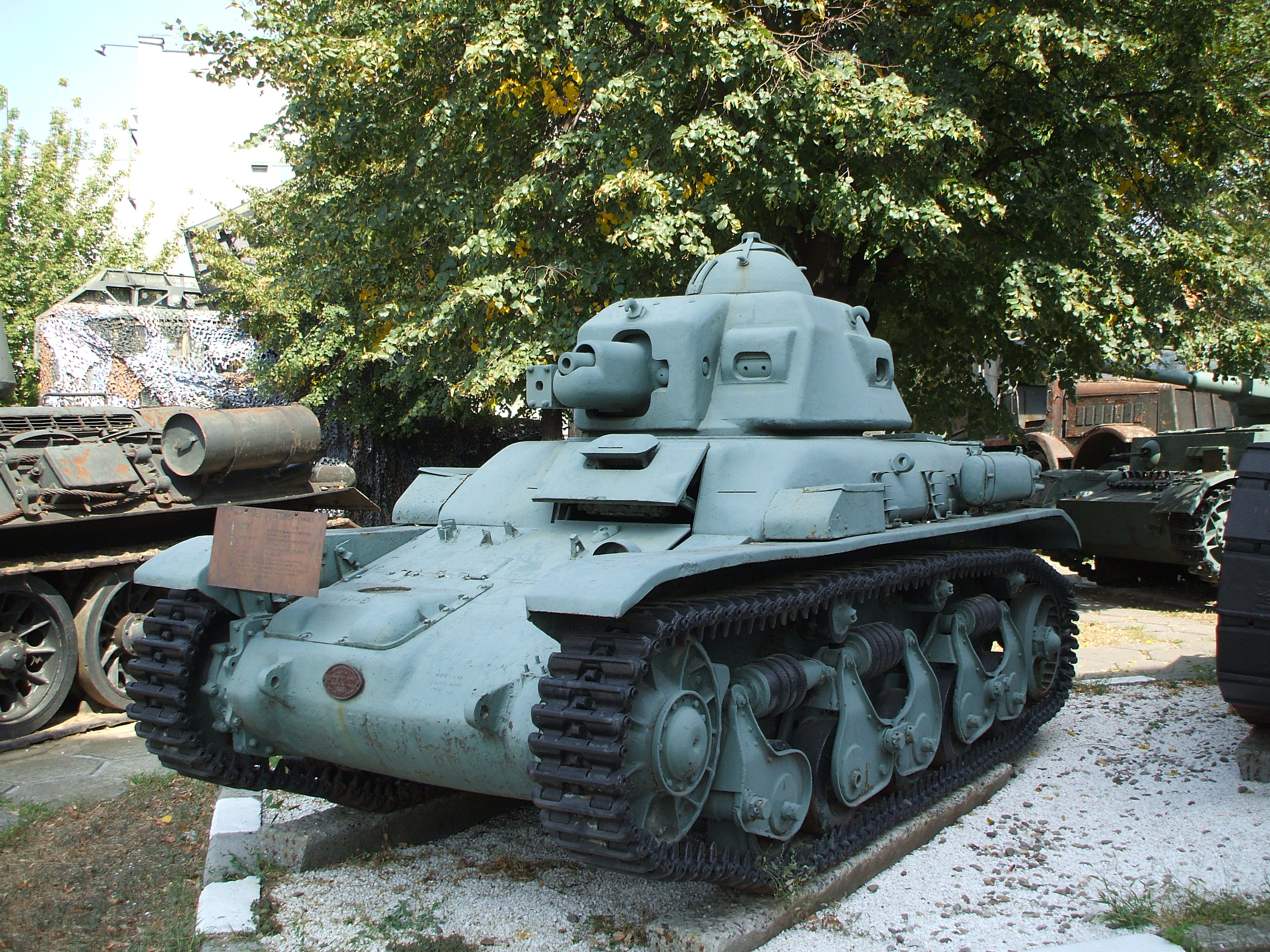
Romanian R35 at the Bucharest National Military Museum (note the metal-rimmed wheels)

The Romanian industry adapted to maintain complex AFVs after the 1941 campaign, when it managed to repair 50 of its Panzer 35(t) light tanks at Ploiești. More comprehensive repairs were carried out for Romania's Renault R35 tanks. An important upgrade was the fitting of new, metal-rimmed, locally designed wheels which were 10 times as durable as the rubber-rimmed originals. Other parts for this tank were also manufactured by several Romanian factories: drive sprockets were produced at the Reșița Works, the fore-mentioned metal-rimmed road wheels along with new tracks were produced at the Concordia Works in Ploiești, and cylinder heads along with drive shafts were cast at the Basarab Works in Bucharest and finished by IAR at Brașov. For the future rearming of 30 R35s as tank destroyers, new gun mounts containing recoil mechanisms were cast at the Concordia Works and fitted as extension to the R35's turret. Romania's T-60 light tanks, captured from the Soviet Union, were to be rebuilt as tank destroyers. To support the added weight this would entail, new road wheels and stronger torsion bars were cast and finished by the Industria Sirmei at Turda, IAR at Brașov and Concordia at Ploiești. The new superstructure for the would-be tank destroyers was designed and cast at Concordia in Ploiești and finished by the Astra Works in Brașov and Lemaitre Works in Bucharest. Romanian factories also refurbished 34 captured Komsomolets armored tractors in 1943, and in early 1944 these were fitted with hooks which enabled them to tow the German Pak 38 anti-tank gun.

== Tank destroyers ==
=== TACAM Series ===
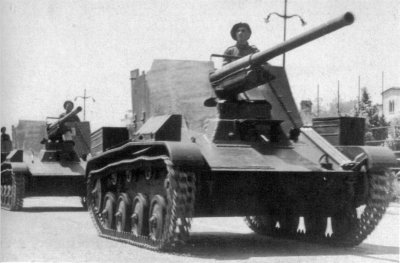
A Romanian TACAM T-60 during the National Day parade, 10 May 1943

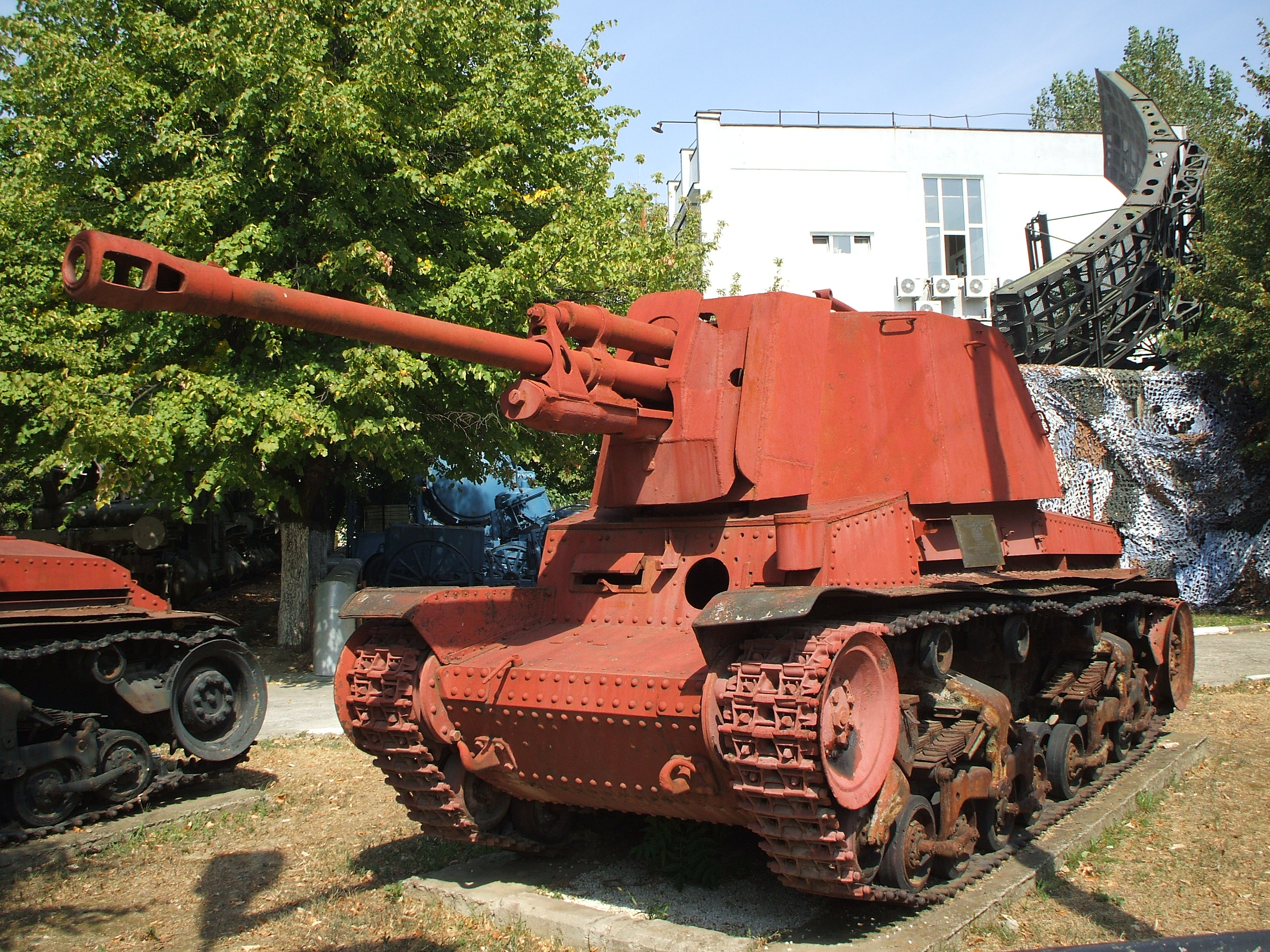
TACAM R-2

The TACAM Series of tank destroyers consisted in four proposed designs, from which two were produced. A total of 55 TACAM tank destroyers were made, all but one being issued to the Romanian Army by July 1944.

==== TACAM T-60 ====
This was the first Romanian-produced tank destroyer. It was based on the Soviet T-60 light tank, 34 of which were converted to TACAM T-60 tank destroyers by the end of 1943. Several Romanian factories were involved in the project, producing numerous parts for the new vehicle, but the assembly itself took place at the Leonida factory in Bucharest. The new vehicle, weighing 9 tons, mounted one Soviet M-1936 F-22 field gun as its main armament. This was supplemented by one ZB-53 heavy machine gun and one submachine gun. All 34 were operational with the Romanian Army as of 19 July 1944.

==== TACAM R-2 ====
This was the second Romanian-produced tank destroyer. It was based on the Czechoslovak Panzer 35(t) light tank, 20 of which were converted to TACAM R-2 tank destroyers during the first half of 1944, plus one prototype in late 1943. The vehicles were converted at the Leonida factory in Bucharest. The new vehicle, weighing 12 tons, mounted one Soviet ZiS-3 field gun as its main armament, apart from the prototype, which mounted one F-22. This was supplemented by one ZB-53 heavy machine gun. All of the vehicles, minus the prototype, were operational with the Romanian Army as of 19 July 1944.

==== TACAM R-1 ====
Proposed design featuring the mounting of a captured Soviet 45 mm anti-tank gun to the AH-IV tankette, 14 of which were still on hand as of late 1943. However, the design was deemed a waste of productive capacity and the project was cancelled.

==== TACAM T-38 ====
In 1943, it was decided to convert 40 Panzer 38(t) light tanks to tank destroyers by fitting them with captured Soviet field guns. Although not formally rejected, this project never began.

==== Operational importance ====
As of 19 July 1944, the TACAMs accounted for over a quarter of Romania's operational AFV able to effectively oppose the Soviet T-34. All such vehicles are listed below:

Name	Type	Country of Origin	Quantity
T-3	Medium tank	Nazi Germany	2
T-4	Medium tank	Nazi Germany	81
TACAM T-60	Tank destroyer	Kingdom of Romania	34
TACAM R-2	Tank destroyer	Kingdom of Romania	20
TAs	Assault gun	Nazi Germany	60

=== Vânătorul de care R-35 ===
The third Romanian tank destroyer. Although this was also based on a light tank, it was not a TACAM because its turret was not removed and replaced with a fixed superstructure. Instead, it was decided to keep the thickly-armored French turret by fitting it with an extension which contained the mount for the vehicle's new weapon: a Soviet 45 mm tank gun. Because of this larger weapon, however, there was no longer room to also carry a coaxial machine gun, and thus the new vehicle had no secondary armament. A total of 30 R35s were rearmed this way. They, along with 30 unconverted R35s, were operational with the Romanian Army as of 19 July 1944.

=== Mareșal ===
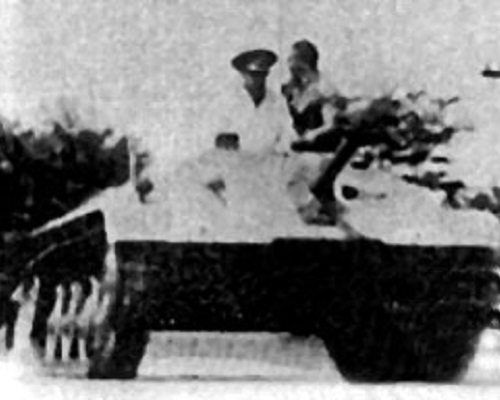
Mareșal tank destroyer

The Mareșal was a native-designed tank destroyer fully enclosed in sloped armor. It never entered service, as only 7 prototypes were built, along with an early serial production. Nevertheless, the vehicle is said to have been the inspiration for the German Hetzer tank destroyer. According to some sources, in May 1944, German Lieutenant-Colonel Ventz (a delegate of the Waffenamt) acknowledged that the Hetzer had followed the Romanian design solution.

== Table of vehicles ==
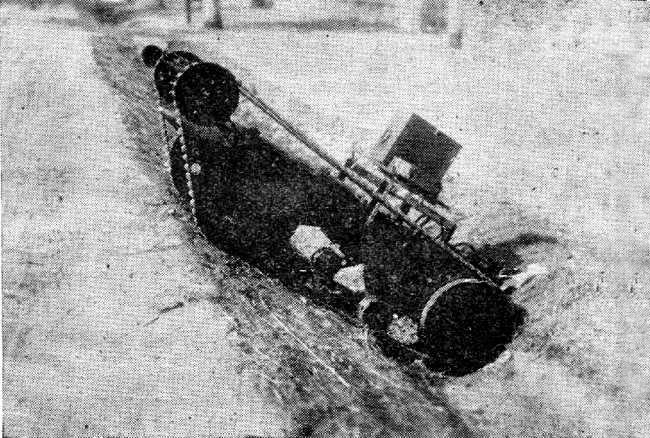
Romanian Goliath tracked mine

=== Produced from scratch or assembled from captured components ===
Model	Type	Number	Manufacturer	Note
Malaxa UE	Armored tractor	126	Malaxa	Licence-made enlarged Renault UE
R-1	Tankette	1	Malaxa	
TACAM T-60	Tank destroyer	34	Leonida	Fitted with F-22 field gun
Mareșal	Tank destroyer	7	Rogifer	Four armed with 122 mm howitzer and two armed with 75 mm anti-tank gun
Romanian Goliath	Demolition vehicle	1	Unspecified	

=== Converted existing tanks in service with the Romanian Army ===
Model	Type	Number	Manufacturer	Conversion
TACAM R-2	Tank destroyer	21	Leonida	Fitted with ZiS-3 field gun (prototype fitted with F-22 field gun)
Vânătorul de care R-35	Tank destroyer	30	Leonida	Rearmed with 45 mm tank gun

=== Improved ===
Model	Type	Number	Main improvement	Note
Renault R35	Light tank	30	Rubber-rimmed wheels replaced by metal-rimmed ones which were 10 times more durable	30 tanks, later rearmed as tank destroyers, also benefited of this upgrade
T-20 Komsomolets	Armored tractor	34	Hook fitted, enabling the towing of German 50 mm anti-tank guns	

== Proposed designs ==
=== Medium tanks ===
- R-3 – proposal to build a medium tank in Romania, based on the Czechoslovak-designed Škoda T-21.
- 1942 medium tank – British historian Mark Axworthy writes how the Romanians wanted to produce a tank comparable to the T-34. Romanian documents give the characteristics of this tank, the proposal of which came by the end of 1942. It was to be a medium tank weighing 16-18 tonnes, reaching a maximum speed of 50 km/h. Its crew was to be of four members, its armament a main gun with a caliber of 50 mm or higher, along with one or two machine guns. The armor was to be of 40–60 mm. According to Axworthy, the project was abandoned, being too challenging for the Romanian industry; Romania instead produced a number of tank destroyers (listed above), which proved to be more adequate for its industry.
- T-34 with 120/150 mm gun – proposal to up-gun captured T-34s with 120 or 150 mm guns fitted into new turrets. Never made.

== Related equipment ==
=== Towed guns with shields ===
- 75 mm Reșița Model 1943 - native-designed, towed (wheeled) dual-purpose field/anti-tank gun, featuring a shield consisting of two 6 mm plates set 20 mm apart (375 produced until December 1944, including 3 prototypes)
- 47 mm Schneider Model 1936 - French-designed, towed (wheeled) anti-tank gun, featuring a shield as well as armored wheels which could be removed and placed as side extensions to the shield for increased protection (140+ produced under licence by Romania at the Concordia Works, production rate being of 14 pieces per month as of October 1942)
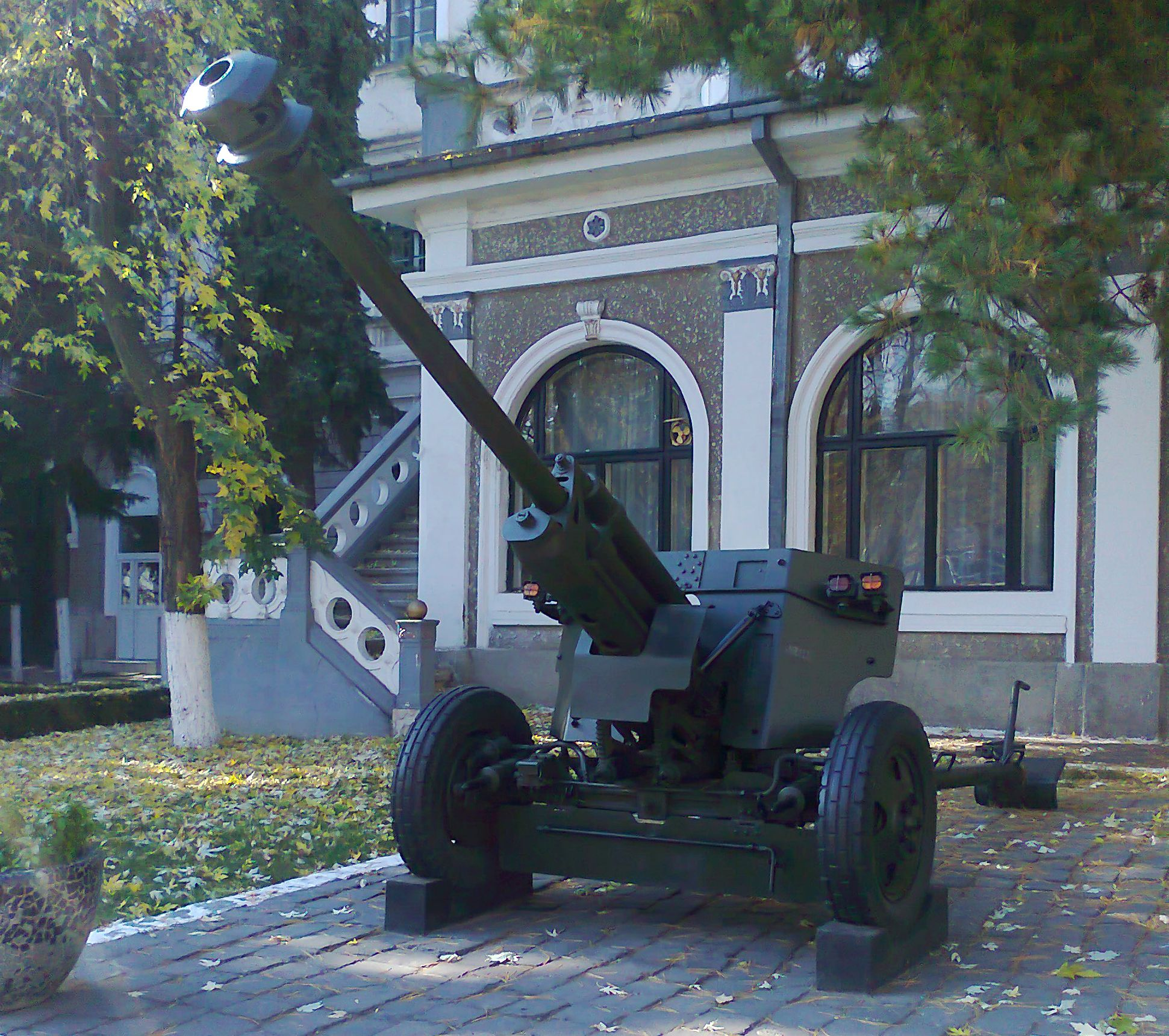
75 mm Reșița Model 1943

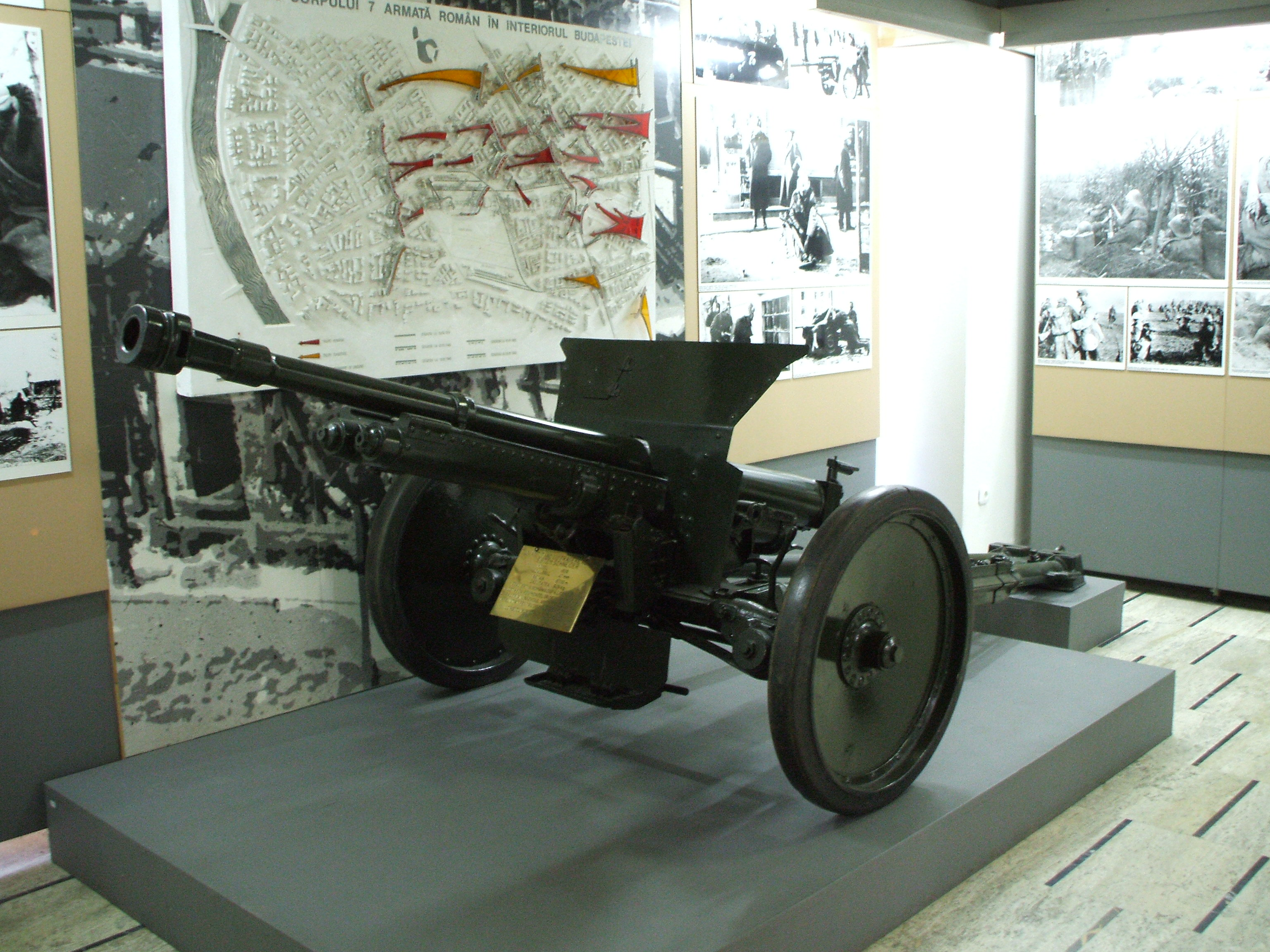
47 mm Schneider Model 1936

=== Unarmored fully tracked/all-wheel drive artillery tractors ===
- T-1 tractor - fully tracked artillery tractor designed specifically to tow the 75 mm Reșița gun (5 prototypes produced)
- Ford Marmon-Herrington 3-ton 4x4 truck - locally assembled 4WD Ford truck by Ford Româna S.A.R., able to tow guns of 75 mm caliber (450 built)

== See also ==
- Arms industry in Romania
- List of Romanian military equipment of World War II
- Romanian military equipment of World War I

== Bibliography ==
- Axworthy, Mark (1995). Third Axis, Fourth Ally. London : New York, NY: Arms and Armour; Distributed in the USA by Sterling Pub. ISBN 978-1-85409-267-0.
