= Romanian military equipment of World War I =

During World War I, the Kingdom of Romania was a source of various types of military equipment. Either directly, or indirectly through Romanian-born people designing military equipment abroad.

== Munitions and related equipment ==
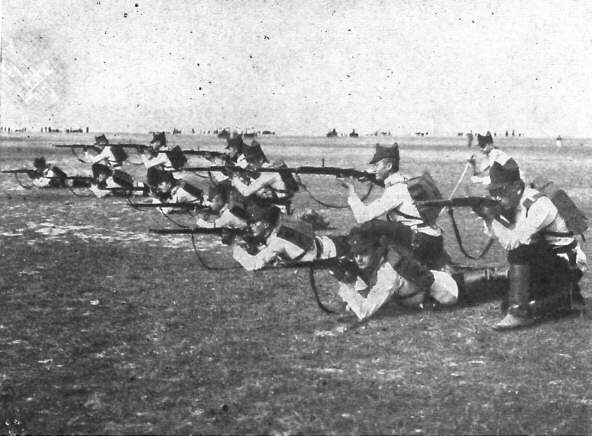
Romanian soldiers during a training exercise. The rifle is the Mannlicher M1893, the standard service rifle of the Kingdom of Romania at the time.

Between 1914 and 1916, 59 Romanian factories along with numerous private contractors produced a total of 400,000 artillery rounds and 45 million small-arms cartridges. Added to these completed projectiles there were cartridge components (70 million bullets and 110 million primers) and artillery shell components (250,000 fuzes). Three Romanian factories produced 1.5 tons of explosives daily, and grenades were also manufactured. Daily production of ammunition amounted to one cartridge for every rifle and two shells for every gun. When it joined the Great War in August 1916, Romania had a total of 600,000 shells. The Romanian Army had enough ammunition for its rifles to last five months, but the country needed 500,000 shells per month to avoid being overwhelmed. From France, 400,000 more shells were awaiting delivery. The entire Romanian production of artillery rounds amounted to 400,000.

At the beginning of the war, the Romanian factories in Bucharest were producing small quantities of ammunition, mostly for training purposes. Made of cast iron, these old models had low striking power. After the start of the war, following the huge amount of ammunition usage observed on the Western Front, production was focused on 75 mm (3.0 in) and 105 mm (4.1 in) quick-fire shells, but production remained limited and shells remained of poor quality. Such was the quality of Romanian-manufactured shells that during the Battle of Nagyszeben (Sibiu) – a Romanian defeat – percussion fuzes exploded inside gun barrels, killing and wounding gunners, or would not explode on the target.

== Artillery elements ==
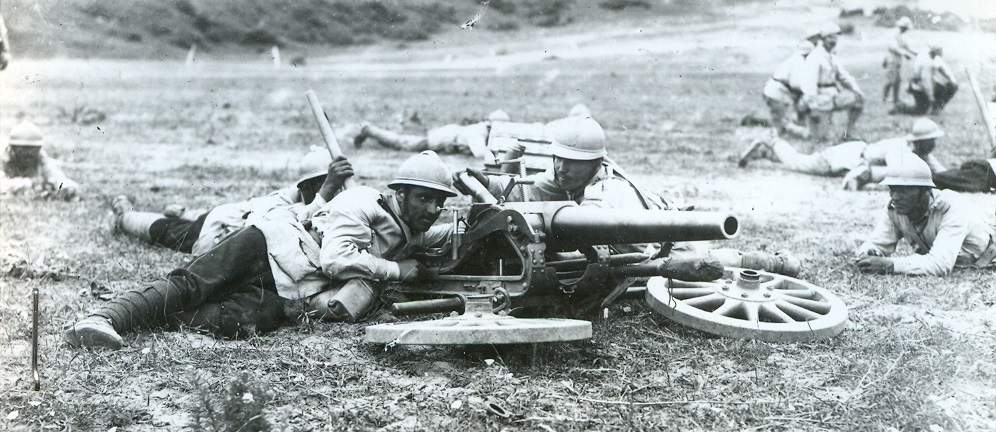
German Fahrpanzer fortress gun removed from its emplacement and mounted on a Romanian-made carriage, thus being converted for field use

As elsewhere, in order to create new artillery units, the Romanians resorted to disarming their fortifications, a decision prompted in part by the quick German destruction of Belgian forts in 1914. By August 1916, part of the 1,400 guns and howitzers from the Romanian forts (37 mm (1.5 in) to 210 mm (8.3 in)) had been mounted on Romanian-produced carriages and assigned to field service. Some were converted to anti-aircraft guns. For instance, the Romanian officer Ștefan Burileanu invented an effective anti-aircraft system for the Hotchkiss 57 mm (2.2 in) rapid-fire gun. Up until Romania's entry into the war, the focus was on light and medium guns. Between 1914 and 1916, 332 gun carriages were produced for guns up to 75 mm. During the same time period, 1,500 caissons were also produced. After Romania entered the war, however, the heavy pieces were also turned into field guns. The 150 mm Krupp M1891/16 L/25 is one example. According to one photography dated October 1916, at least five such guns were converted for field use. Seven new heavy artillery regiments were formed. By 1918, the heaviest Romanian fortress guns had been converted for field use, as exemplified by the Iași (Krupp) Model 1888/1918 210 mm howitzer.

=== The Ghenea gun sight ===
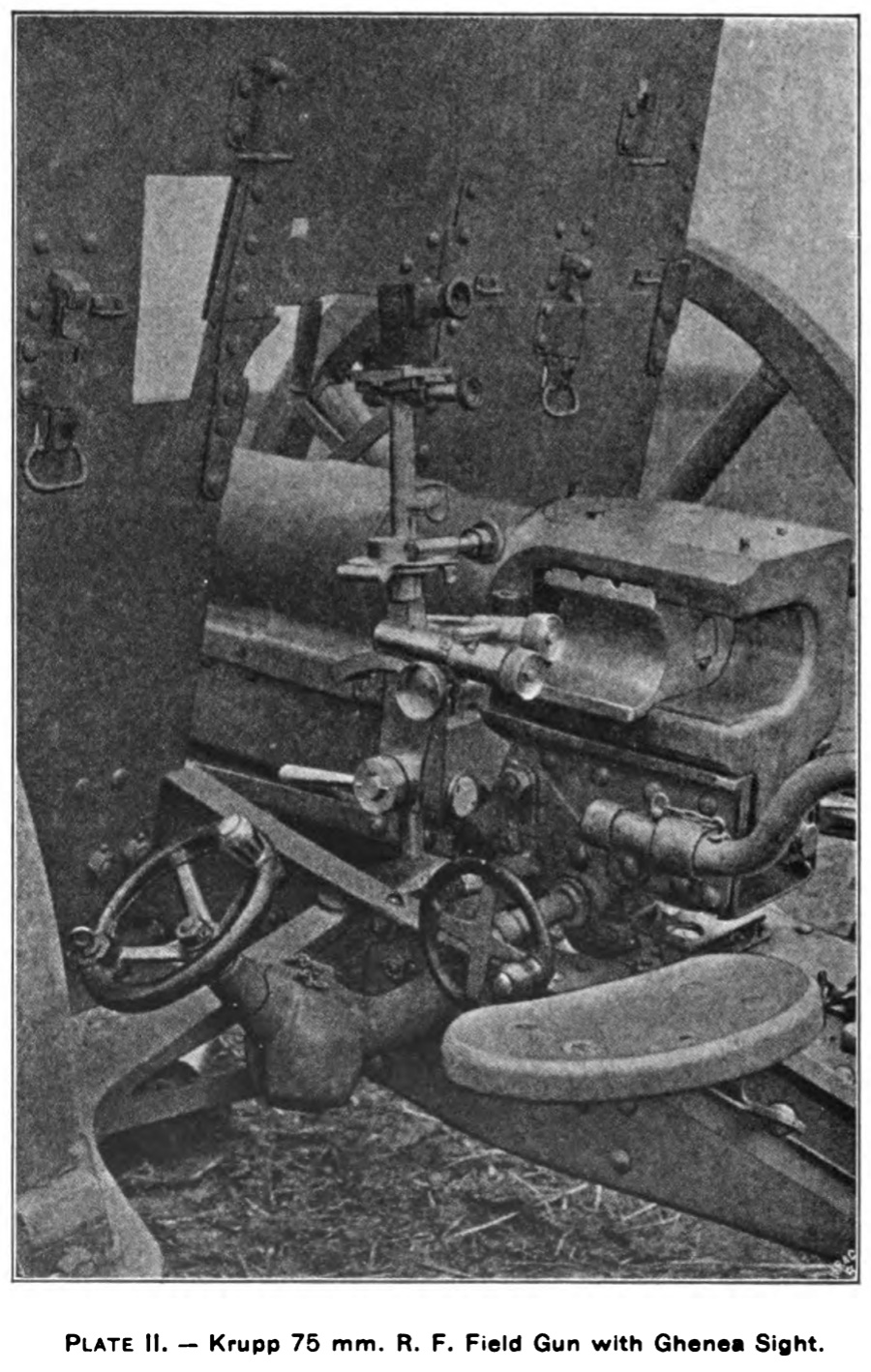
The Ghenea gun sight of a Romanian 7.5 cm Krupp Model 1903 field gun

The first artillery panoramic field lenses, later adopted by all the armies of the world, were invented by the Romanian General Toma Ghenea. Ghenea patented his "sighting attachment for ordnance" on 13 December 1902. Beginning with 1902, the panoramic sight began to gain ground very rapidly. But by 1907, Ghenea's was still "one of the most perfect yet devised". It had compensating gear for drift-caused lateral deviations and level of wheels. Ghenea's gun sight enabled sighting adjustments to be made rapidly, even for extreme alterations. The vertical angle which the sight made with the axis of the gun could be read on a quadrant scale. The Ghenea sight was peculiar because the pedestal itself was mounted on a transverse horizontal pivot to which the drum on which the elevation was set was attached. The pedestal itself was always perpendicular with the line of sight. The longitudinal level was just over the eyepiece of the panorama sight. In the Romanian Army, Ghenea's sight was fitted to the 75 mm Krupp L/30 field gun, being used for both direct and indirect laying. The Ghenea sight allowed the gun layer to adjust the range during the return of the piece in battery, by lightly turning the elevation screw which was just in front of him, without having to take his eye off the level. The bubble of the level was brought to its central position as soon as the forward movement of the gun was finished. With an ordinary sight, changing the range elevation while the gun was in motion was impossible.

== Vehicle assembly ==
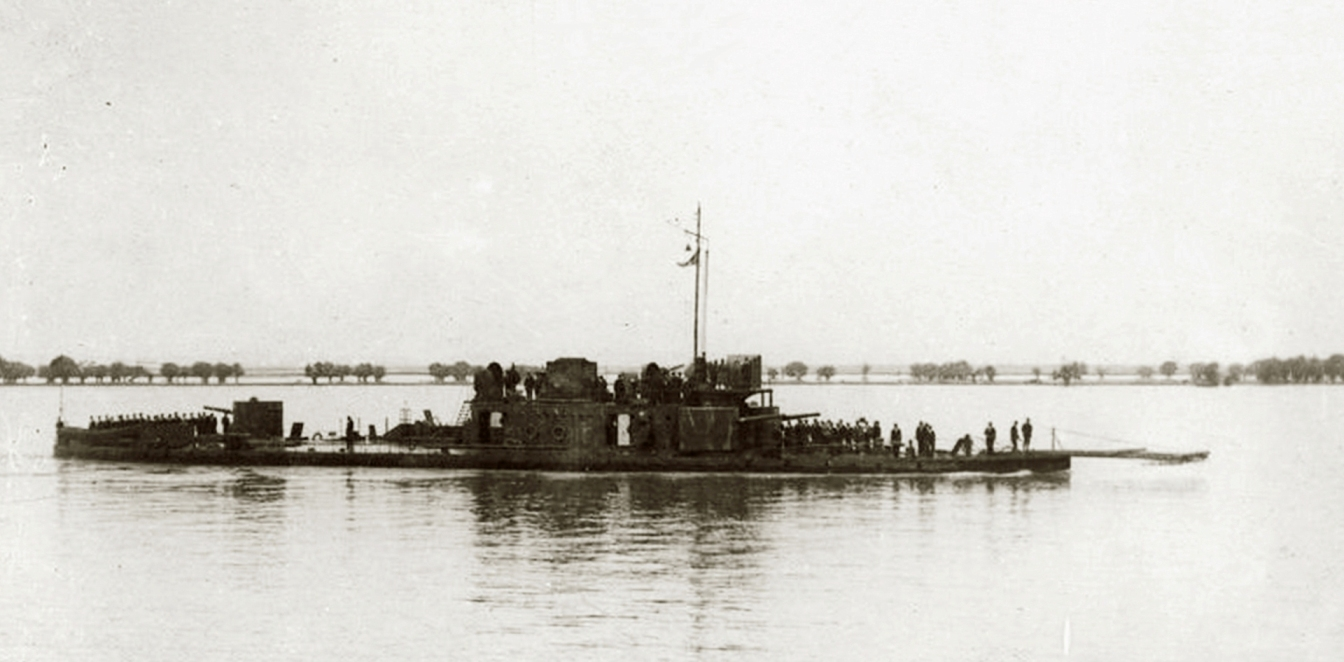
One of the four Romanian river monitors

Between 1907 and 1908, Romania assembled and launched four river monitors at the Galați shipyard. The monitors were built in sections by STT in Austria-Hungary, then transported to Galați and assembled there. The four vessels were named Ion C. Brătianu, Lascăr Catargiu, Mihail Kogălniceanu and Alexandru Lahovary. Each vessel displaced 680 tons, had a top speed of 13 knots and a crew of 110. Armament consisted of three 120 mm (4.7 inches) L/35 naval guns, two 120 mm (4.7 inches) L/10 naval howitzers, four 47 mm guns and two 6.5 mm machine-guns. Armor thickness amounted to 75 mm (almost 3 inches) on the sides, deck and turrets and 50 mm (almost two inches) on the conning tower. All but Alexandru Lahovary were launched in 1907, the latter being launched in 1908. The first monitor to be launched at Galați was Lascăr Catargiu. The four monitors first saw action during the Battle of Turtucaia. On 2 September 1916, after the German formation known as Abteilung Kaufmann penetrated into the western edge of the defences of Turtucaia, the artillery fire of the Romanian monitors brought the Germans to a halt. The Abteilung attempted again on the following day, 3 September. It divided into three columns and attempted to seize high ground which dominated the Romanian defences. All three columns were brought to a halt by defensive fire, however, and then forced to withdraw, leaving behind around 300 dead and wounded. The third and final attack of Abteilung Kaufmann, on 4 September, was successful, the valuable high ground being captured. Subsequently, the monitors proceeded to evacuate Turtucaia. Alexandru Lahovary evacuated General Teodorescu and his staff, while the other three monitors - organised as the 2nd Monitor Division - safely evacuated the 9th Romanian Infantry Division. During the following year, the monitors joined the army artillery in holding the line against the Germans in Moldavia throughout the summer and autumn of 1917. In early 1918, the monitors were primarily engaged in sweeping mines from channels, rivers and ports.

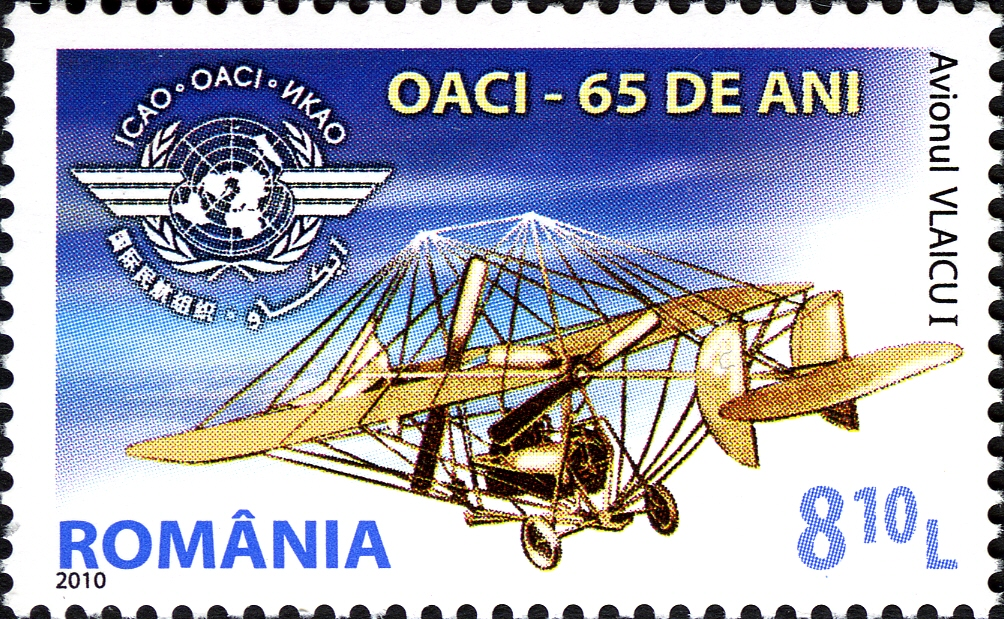
Romanian stamp depicting the A Vlaicu I aircraft

During the Balkan Wars of 1912–1913, Romania was the only country in the region to have developed its own aircraft. Bulgaria, Serbia and even the Ottoman Empire lacked native aircraft at the time, but Romania had two machines designed by Aurel Vlaicu – A Vlaicu I and A Vlaicu II – in service with its army. Vlaicu's design had a chain-driven propeller at either end of the wing, the rudder at the front of the aircraft, a triangular tail and a 50 hp Gnome et Rhône engine. At an Austro-Hungarian aircraft contest in the summer of 1912, Vlaicu's "strange-looking monoplane", a "refreshing oddity", took the first prizes for landing in the smallest circle and for accurate "bomb dropping". Vlaicu's aircraft was nicknamed "La Folle Mouche" ("The Crazy Fly"). Although the model was subsequently purchased by the Romanian Army, Vlaicu was killed in a crash during September 1913, which also destroyed his second aircraft. Before Romania's entry into World War I, a Romanian factory started manufacturing Farman aircraft under licence. Six Farmans were ordered and served in the Romanian Air Corps. On the eve of its entry into the war in 1916, the Romanian Air Corps had 24 aircraft and another 20 from the flight schools. During the war, a number of 242-292 aircraft and 545 engines were assembled at RGA. During late 1917, limited assembly of Nieuport 17 fighters also took place at the Romanian port town of Sulina. The aircraft assembled there arrived in crates at Chilia. On 7 October, two assembled fighters were already in service at Sulina, and by the end of the year, four more operational and two non-operational aircraft were added. It is not known for certain if the Sulina air unit was involved in any combat.

== Armored car production ==
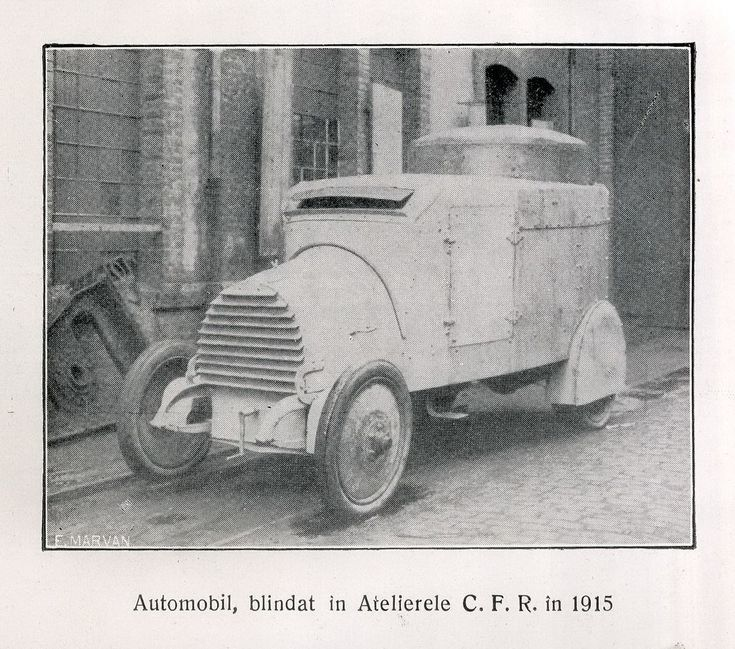
CFR 1915 armored car

=== WW1 ===
In 1915, an armored car was designed at the CFR workshops in Bucharest. It used the chassis of a truck that was being repaired at the workshops. The armored car could mount a single machine gun in a fixed turret. The car was assigned to the armored car section of the Automobile Traction Regiment, then transferred to the Assault Tank Battalion (Batalionul Carelor de Asalt) in 1919.

During the war, when the workshops were located at Iași, another armored car was built. This armored car was larger and it was equipped with an unspecified machine gun, as well as with a 57 mm Burileanu anti-aircraft gun.

=== Automobil blindat M1919 ===
During the Hungarian-Romanian War of 1919, the Romanian Army used an armored car of native design and construction. The car used the chassis of a commercial truck, possibly from one of the Renault trucks received in 1916. Presumably, the design and construction of this machine took place at the end of 1918 and were finished in 1919.

There is no description of its construction. Presumably, a wooden (or steel) frame was installed on a 4x2 truck chassis, on which sheets of steel armor were attached with rivets and bolts. The thickness of the armor could have been from 6 to 8 mm. A hexagonal turret in which a machine gun could be mounted was installed on the roof of the hull. It is known for sure that this armored car participated in the entry of the Romanian troops into Budapest in August 1919.

== Foreign-produced military equipment of Romanian design ==
=== Henri Coandă ===
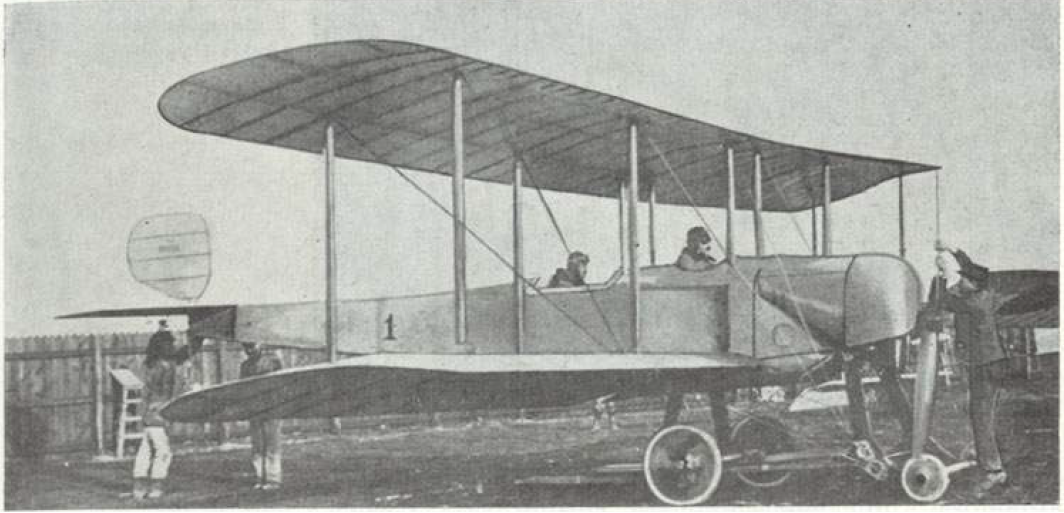
Bristol-Coandă T.B.8 biplane

The Romanian-born inventor Henri Coandă designed several models of aircraft for the British Bristol Aeroplane Company. In January 1912, he was formally appointed Bristol's leading technician. His first design was the Bristol-Coandă monoplane. This aircraft was tested for the first time at Larkhill in March 1912. It was manufactured in both tandem and two-seater modes. Powered by an 80 hp Gnome et Rhône engine, the aircraft had a four-wheeled undercarriage and incorporated wing-warping for lateral control. This Romanian design gained Bristol the third prize during a flying competition. Italy ordered up to 14, while Romania itself ordered 10. In October 1914, Coandă left Bristol and returned to Romania. Despite a subsequent ban on monoplanes, Coandă's design was still much talked about, being rated as one of the leading machines of the day. Still, it was the influence of Coandă's father - General Constantin Coandă - that was decisive in the adoption of the model by Romania. The Bristol T.B.8 biplane was developed from the Coandă monoplane. A total of 53 were produced, including conversions from Coandă monoplanes. Coandă invented a new bomb-dropping device for these biplanes, containing twelve bombs which could be released by a hand lever in the observer's seat. The Coandă biplanes, made using the same fuselage as the Coandă monoplanes, were much better than the latter, but still had a glaring flaw: they were tail-heavy. Coandă obstinately refused to address this issue, being adamant that his calculations were correct. The planes were, in fact, "a bit tail heavy". The "Bristol-Coandă Bomb Rack One", as it was called, was put to use solely on the Bristol-Coandă T.B.8 biplane. Throughout the summer of 1913, the structurally suspect Coandă monoplane was modified and converted to this tractor-biplane configuration, known thereafter as T.B.8. The design proved moderately successful, a manufacturing licence for it being subsequently acquired by the French firm Bréguet. The T.B.8 was used as a bomber only once, on 25 November 1914, when one made a bombing attack on German artillery batteries at Middelkerke, Belgium. Romania itself acquired 7 Bristol-Coandă monoplanes and 10 Bristol-Coandă T.B.8 biplanes. Given that, on the eve of its entry into the war in 1916, the Romanian Air Force had 44 aircraft, this means that a significant part of Romania's air power was Romanian-designed: the 17 aforementioned Coandă aircraft plus the remaining airplanes designed and built by Aurel Vlaicu.

=== George Constantinescu ===
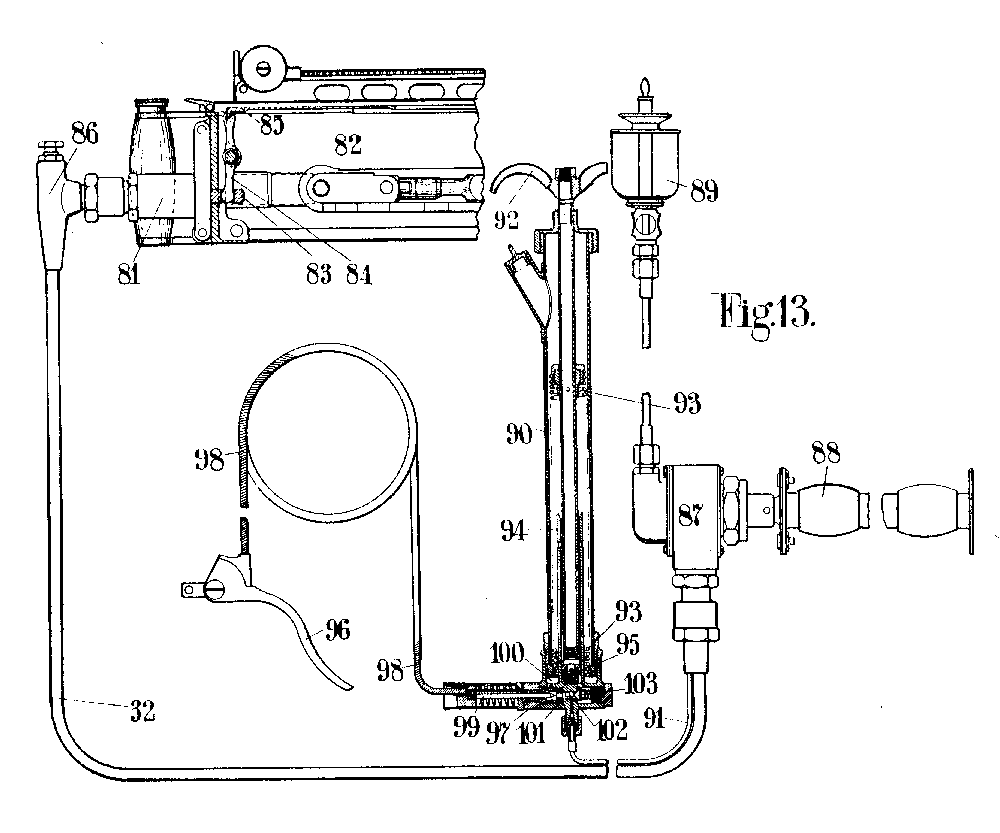
The Constantinescu synchronization gear

The Romanian engineer George Constantinescu, working with Vickers in the United Kingdom during the war, invented what would become the main synchronizing device for the Royal Air Force. Constantinescu's men constructed the synchronizing gear within 9 days. It was such a simple but so completely effective device, that hundreds of thousands were made with no modifications needed. Although initially designed to fire only one machine gun, the Constantinescu gear was soon adapted to operate two, mounted parallel to each other. The Romanian design made the Vickers machine gun a superb aircraft weapon, given that it was a reliable synchronizing gear. A brilliant achievement of the Romanian engineer. The Constantinescu gear began being used starting with early 1917, when production aircraft started being delivered armed with a forward-firing Vickers gun synchronized with the Constantinescu gear. Among the aircraft fitted with the Constantinescu synchronized forward-firing equipment was the Sopwith Pup. In August 1917, American representatives sent to Europe by the War Department acquired two Vickers aircraft machine guns equipped with the Constantinescu synchronizing gears.

== See also ==
- Arms industry in Romania
- List of Romanian military equipment of World War II
- Romanian armored fighting vehicle production during World War II
