= T-1 tractor =

T-1
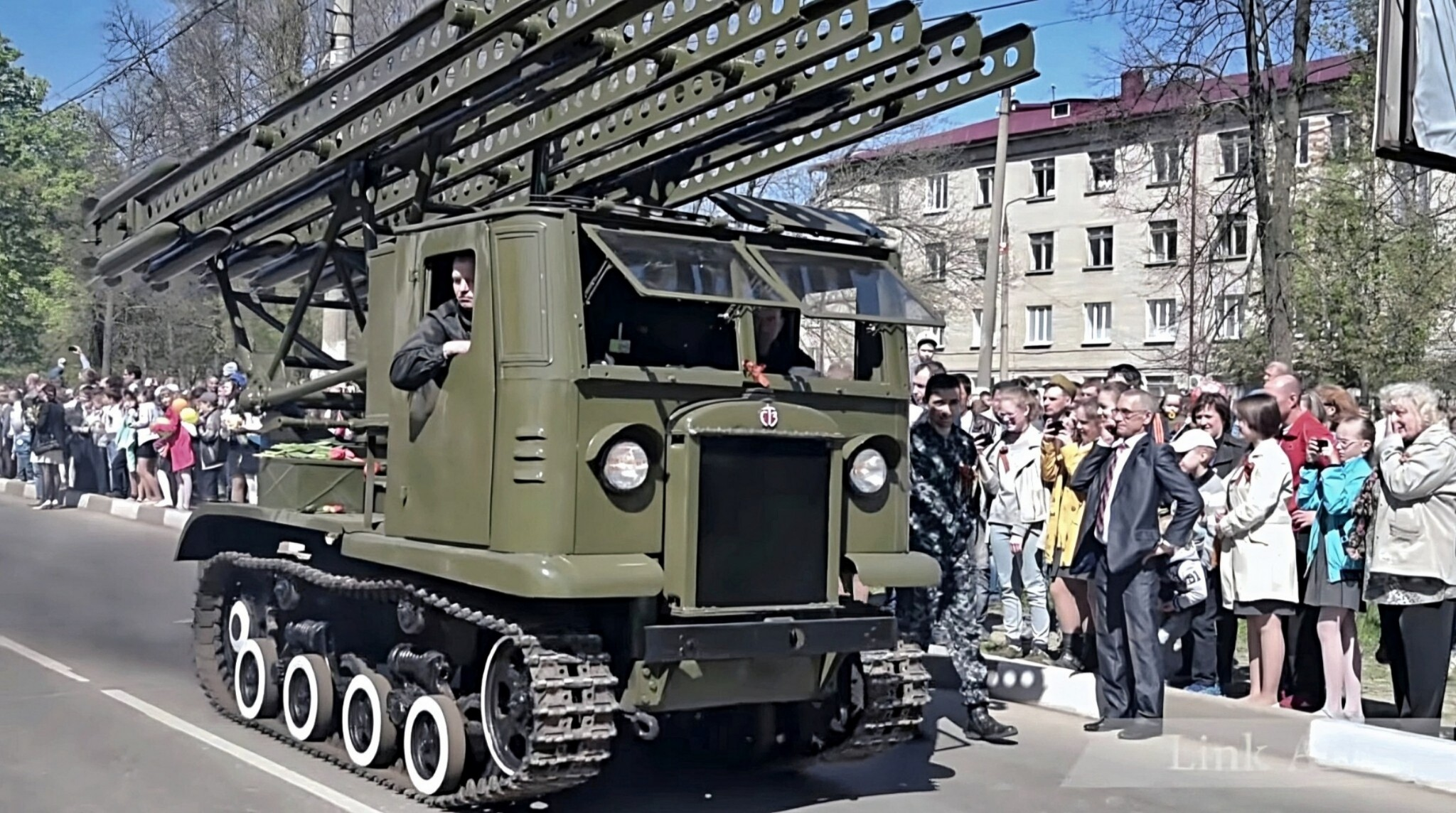
- Soviet STZ tractor, the vehicle the T-1 was likely based on
- Type: Artillery tractor
- Place of origin: Romania

Service history
- Wars: World War II

Production history
- Designer: Direcția Tehnică
- Designed: 1943
- Manufacturer: Rogifer, Reșița, Ford
- Produced: 1943–44
- No. built: 5 prototypes

Specifications
- Mass: 7 t (7.7 short tons)
- Engine: 4-cylinder 56 kW (75 hp) at 1800 rpm
- Power/weight: 10.7 hp/tonne
- Payload capacity: 4 tonnes (4.4 short tons) (towing: 6 tonnes (6.6 short tons))
- Transmission: 5 gears
- Maximum speed: 32 km/h (20 mph)

The T-1 tractor (also known as DT-1, Direcția Tehnică 1) was a project developed by the Romanian Army during World War II. A total of 1,000 were ordered. It was designed to tow a Romanian 75 mm gun. After five prototypes were produced, the project was canceled due to the lack of priority.

== Specifications ==
The T-1 weighed 7 tons (7.7 short tons) and could carry up to 4 tons and tow as much as 6 tons. It had a 4-cylinder 56 kilowatt (75 hp) engine and transmission consisting of five gears. It could go up to 32 km/h (20 mph) and had a power-to-weight ratio of 10.7 hp/tonne.

== Development ==
The Romanian General Staff ordered the construction of 1,000 tractors between 1944 and 1945 at the Ford truck plant in Bucharest. The vehicles were officially designated as T-1 (Tractor 1). It was also named the "DT-1". It was going to be used as a prime mover towing the Romanian-built 75 mm antitank gun Reşiţa Model 1943.

== Production ==
The vehicle was based on the STZ-5 agricultural tractor. Only five prototypes were built, because the "Mareşal" tank destroyer project had more priority.
