= TACAM T-38 =

Romanian tank destroyer project

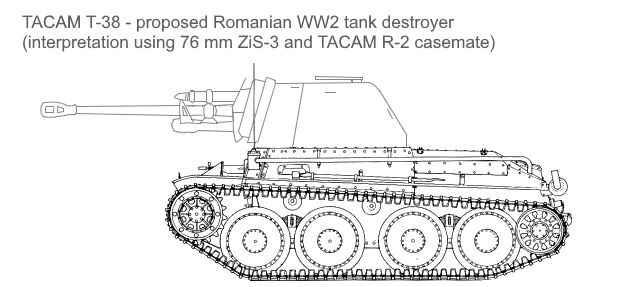
- Interpretation based on the vehicle's description
- Type: Tank destroyer
- Place of origin: Kingdom of Romania

Service history
- Wars: World War II

Production history
- Designed: 1943
- No. built: proposal

Specifications
- Main armament: 1 x 76.2 mm gun

The TACAM T-38 (Tun Anticar pe Afet Mobil T-38 – "Anti-tank gun on T-38 mobile gun carriage") was a tank destroyer design proposed to be built in Romania during World War II. It was supposed to be a successor of the similar TACAM R-2, but never entered production.

== History ==
In late 1942, the Kingdom of Romania had begun a program of modernization for its armored forces. This gave birth to different tank destroyers, one of which was the TACAM R-2, built on the chassis of the R-2 light tank. A similar project was supposed to start in 1943 – that was the TACAM T-38, proposed to be built on the chassis of the similar T-38 light tank.

The TACAM R-2 was armed with a 76 mm ZiS-3 gun and had an open casemate built on its chassis. A total of 40 R-2s were supposed to be converted into TACAMs. However, by the end of June 1944, only 20 were converted. It was decided to halt the production because the gun was deemed inadequate to face the new Soviet IS-2 heavy tanks. It was proposed to either up-gun them with the Romanian 75 mm Reșița M1943 or the German 8.8 cm Flak, or turn them to flamethrower tanks. None of the proposals were materialized because of King Michael's Coup that made Romania defect from the Axis powers. Thus, the TACAM T-38 never came to be produced, either.

The TACAM T-38 was planned to be armed with an unspecified Soviet 76.2 mm gun, which was very likely the same ZiS-3 gun as used on the TACAM R-2, since the TACAM T-38 was supposed to be that vehicle's successor. Since the TACAM R-2 was, in the meantime, proposed to be up-gunned with the 75 mm Reșița M1943 or the 8.8 cm Flak, it is logical to conclude that those guns would also have been proposed for the TACAM T-38.

British historian Mark Axworthy writes that the TACAM T-38 would presumably have been similar to the German Marder III (Sd.Kfz. 139).

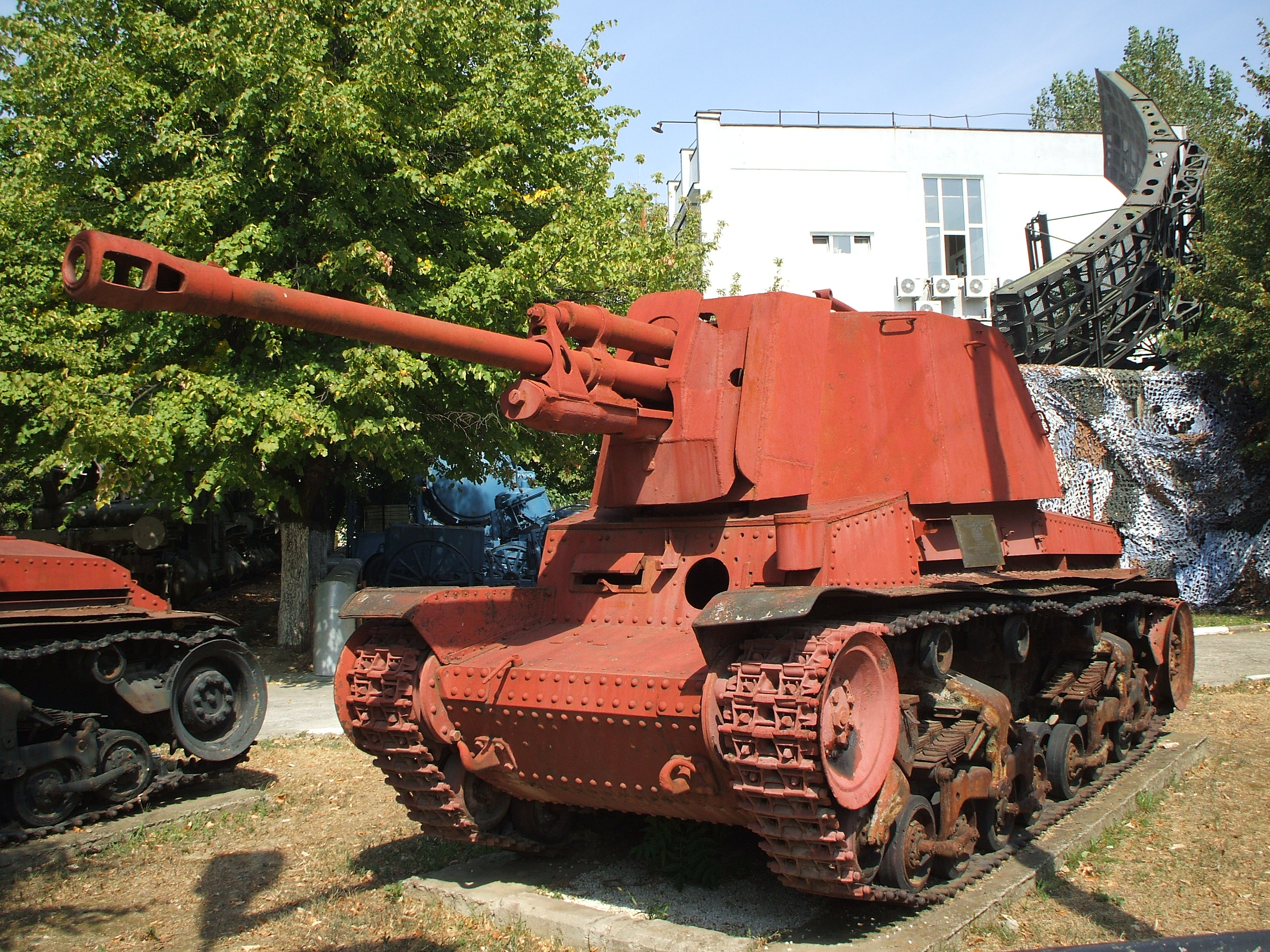
The similar TACAM R-2, which the TACAM T-38 was supposed to be the successor of

== See also ==
=== Vehicles comparable in characteristics ===
- German Marder I, II and III
- Italian Semovente da 75/34
- Romanian TACAM R-2 and TACAM T-60
- Soviet SU-76

== Bibliography ==
- Axworthy, Mark; Scafeș, Cornel; Crăciunoiu, Cristian [in Romanian] (1995). Third Axis Fourth Ally: Romanian Armed Forces in the European War, 1941-1945. London: Arms and Armour. ISBN 9781854092670.
- Zaloga, Steven J. (2013). Tanks of Hitler's Eastern Allies 1941-45. Oxford, UK: Osprey Publishing. ISBN 978-1-78096-020-3.
