= Marder =

Marder may refer to:

== German military vehicles ==
- A series of World War II tank destroyers:
  - Marder I
  - Marder II
  - Marder III
- Marder (IFV), a modern infantry fighting vehicle
- Marder (submarine), a World War II midget submarine

== People with the surname ==
- Arthur Marder (1910–1980), American historian
- Barry Marder, American stand-up comedian
- Darius Marder, American film director and screenwriter
- Eve Marder, American neuroscientist
- Janet Marder, American female rabbi
- Larry Marder, American cartoonist
- Malerie Marder, American photographer
- Marlene Marder, Swiss guitarist
- Maureen Marder, exotic dancer and welder whose life was the basis of Flashdance
- Michael Marder, Basque contemporary philosopher
- Rebecca Marder, French actress
- Seth Marder, American chemist
- Steven Marder, dotcom executive

== Other uses ==
- Marder (Zoids), a zoid from Zoids

== See also ==
- Marten (disambiguation), "Marder" is German for the animal marten
