= Marder I =

German tank destroyer

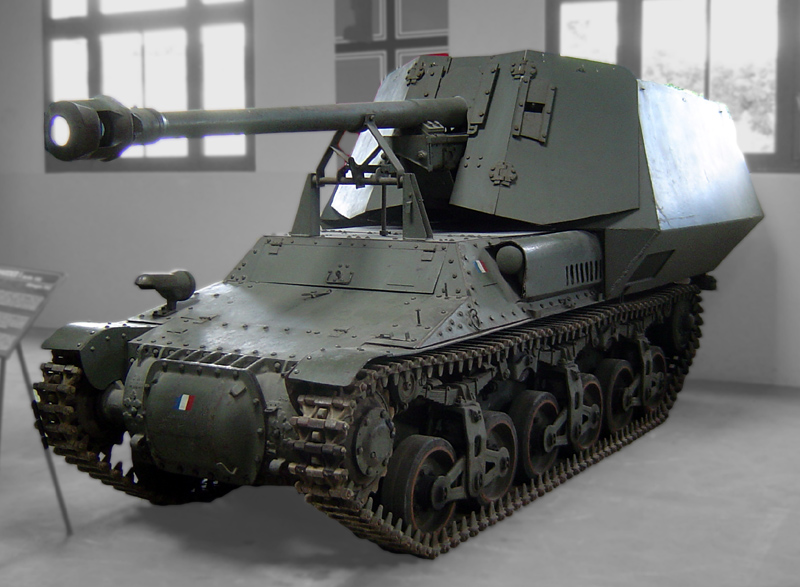
- Marder I on display at the Musée des Blindés at Saumur.
- Type: Tank destroyer
- Place of origin: German

Service history
- In service: 1942–1944
- Used by: Wehrmacht
- Wars: World War II

Production history
- Designed: 1942
- No. built: 170

Specifications
- Mass: 8,200 kg (18,100 lb)
- Length: 5.38 m (17 ft 8 in)
- Width: 1.88 m (6 ft 2 in)
- Height: 2 m (6 ft 7 in)
- Crew: 4 to 5
- Armor: 5–12 mm
- Main armament: 7.5 cm Pak 40
- Engine: Delahaye 103TT; 70 PS (69 hp; 51 kW)
- Power/weight: 8.4 hp (6.3 kW) / tonne
- Operational range: 135–150 km (84–93 mi) road
- Maximum speed: 34–38 km/h (21–24 mph) road; 15–20 km/h (9.3–12.4 mph) off-road

The Marder I "Marten" (Sd.Kfz. 135) was a German World War II tank destroyer, armed with a 75 mm Pak-40 anti-tank gun. Most Marder Is were built on the base of the Tracteur Blindé 37L (Lorraine), a French artillery tractor/armored personnel carrier of which the Germans had acquired more than 300 units after the Fall of France in 1940.

== History ==
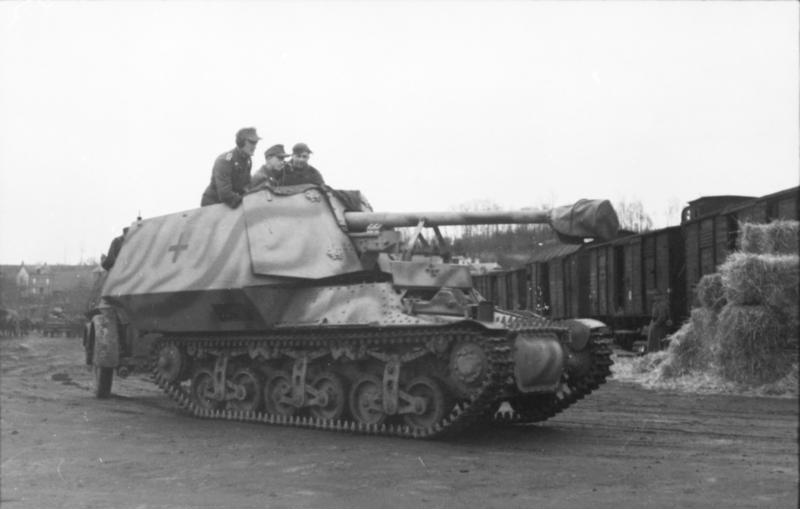
Marder I, 1943

From the early stages of Operation Barbarossa the Wehrmacht became aware that their ability to combat some of the Soviet tanks was inadequate. The lighter tanks then in general service, such as the Panzer II and the Czech built 38(t), were under-armoured and did not mount an adequate gun to deal with the newer Soviet tanks. In addition, the standard towed anti-tank gun of the Wehrmacht, the 37 mm 3.7 cm Pak 36, was both difficult to get into position quickly and lacked the ability to penetrate the heavy sloped armour of the new Soviet tanks. What was needed was a more powerful anti-tank gun that was mobile. The Germans possessed such a gun in the 75 mm 7.5 cm Pak 40. They also had come into possession of a large number of captured Soviet 76 mm F-22 Model 1936 divisional field guns. The Germans had experience in taking the chassis of an under-gunned tank to provide mobility to a heavier gun. The Panzerjäger I is such an example, where the turret was removed for an open conversion to allow the gunners the necessary room to operate the gun.

With the shock of having units overrun by new Soviet T-34 medium tanks and KV-1 heavy tanks, the need for a heavier-gunned German tank became urgent. As an interim solution, it was decided to use captured French vehicles such as the Lorraine, and less effective German tanks such as the Panzer II and Panzer 38(t) as the basis for makeshift tank destroyers. The result was the Marder series, comprising the Marder I, Marder II, and Marder III respectively. These vehicles provided mobility to either the 7.62 cm Pak 36(r) (a conversion of the 76 mm F-22 Model 1936) gun or in later versions the German 7.5 cm Pak 40 anti-tank gun. Due to the weight and space constraints of the small chassis, the Marder series were not fully armoured. Thin upper armour protection was provided only for the front and sides against shrapnel and small arms only. All Marder series had open tops. Some were issued with canvas covers to protect the crew from the elements.

== Development ==
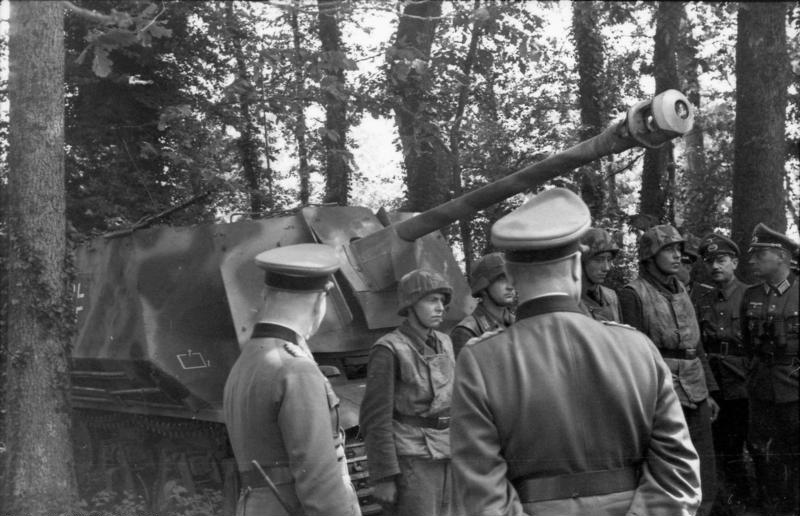
Marder I of the 21st Panzer in Normandy, converted from Hotchkiss, 1944.

The Marder I was developed in May 1942 by Major Alfred Becker. It carried the 75 mm Pak 40 anti-tank gun on a Lorraine chassis. As the gun was relatively large, the original crew compartment superstructure was removed to create the space needed to work the gun. This was done by Baukommando Becker, an organization in occupied France converting French armoured fighting vehicles for internal security use. The gun was then mounted atop the chassis. Alkett, working in conjunction with Becker, produced the angled armour shielding for the crew compartment. The shielding was relatively light, and was open from above. The shielding provided the crew with protection from blast and small arms fire, but was not intended to stop armour piercing rounds. The vehicle's primary function was to provide mobility to the anti-tank gun. It was not intended as a replacement for a tank.

In July and August 1942, 170 Marder Is were built on the Lorraine chassis. Later, two other French tanks were also used as the conversion base for the Marder I, these were the Hotchkiss H39 and FCM 36, (other French tanks like the Renault R35 were also used as a base for new tank destroyers but these were not called Marder I). The new conversions were also completed in 1942 by Baukommando Becker at the Hotchkiss plant on the outskirts of Paris, 24 Hotchkiss tanks were converted as well as 10 from the FCM 36. The Marder Is initially served in infantry divisions on the Eastern Front and met with good success. They later made up a significant component of the armoured fighting vehicles of the reformed 21st Panzer Division in Normandy.

== Combat history ==
The first Lorraine-based Marder I vehicles were sent to the Eastern Front in 1942 to serve in the Panzerjäger (tank destroyer) units of infantry divisions.

This is a list of Infantry Divisions operating on the Eastern Front known to have used Marder Is and the estimated time frame they were used

Division	Battalion	Time frame
31.Inf. Div	Pz. Jg.Abt.31	Aug 42 - Dec 43
35.Inf. Div	2.Kp./Pz. Jg.Abt.35	Sep 42 - Dec 43
36.Inf. Div (mot)	4.Kp./Pz. Jg.Abt.38	Oct 42 - Jun 43
72.Inf. Div	3.Kp./Pz. Jg.Abt.72	Sep 42 - Dec 43
206th Inf. Div.	1./Pz. Jg.Schn. Abt.206	Jan 43 - Dec 43
256.Inf. Div	5./Pz. Schnelle-Abt.256	Nov 42 - Apr 44
227. Inf. Div	~2. &/or 3.Kp. Pz. Jg.-Abt.227	

"On 14 August 1942, ... Gen.Qu. was requested to include 72 - 7.5cm Pak40 (Marder I) Lorraine on Blitztransport trains." (6 initially noted divisions issued 9 and then 10 Marder I "in accordance with K.St.N.1148a dated 15Feb42 for a Panzerjäger-Kompanie (9 Sfl.)" then "10 7.5cm Pak40/1 auf Sfl. Lorraine-Schlepper and organized in accordance with K.St.N.1148a dated 1Dec42." Alfred Becker notes: "By Christmas 1942 almost all of Becker’s men had reached Paris. In exchange for the men Becker provided the commander of the 227th Infantry Division with 20 of his armoured vehicles.[22]". This follows on from the ground breaking pre-Pz. div. developmental use of the Becker's first conversion vehicles: 12x 10.5 cm leFH 16 Geschützwagen Mk VI 736 (e) & six of the larger 15 cm sFH13 guns on Mk VI 736(e) by the 227th Inf. Div.

"Two additional leFH18/4 (Sf.) mounted on Lorraine Schlepper chassis were completed with a modified superstructure (similar in design and purpose to the 38t Grille sIG 33, with an additional 12 built for and used by the 2 PzGren Regts of 21 Pz. div.) and delivered in early December 1942 as a new Sturmgeschütz-Zug for the 15.Batterie/Artillerie-Regiment 227." (Of 227th Inf.Div.).

"An additional 64 sFH13 (after the first 30 built in June 42 and shipped to Rommel) were mounted on Lorraine-Schlepper chassis at Wa A Paris in July and August 1942. Gepanzerte Artillerie-Regiment 1 (Sfl) and 2 (Sfl) were each issued 30 sFH14 auf Sfl. To fill their five batteries.".

== Gallery ==
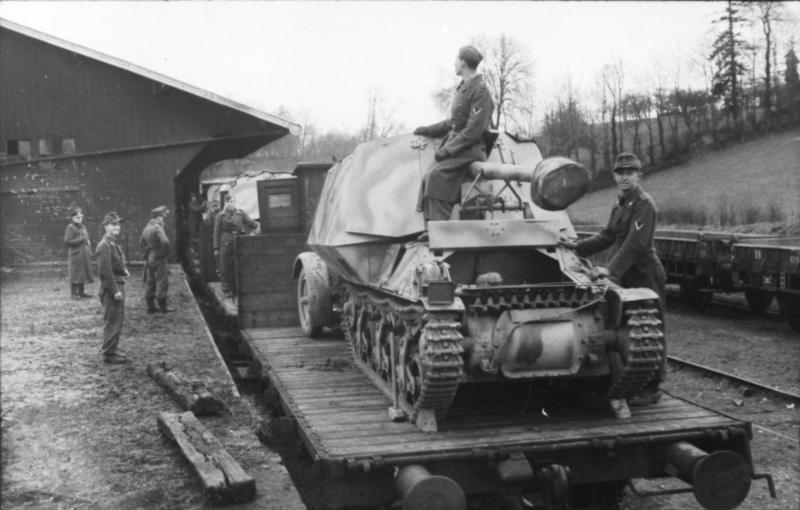
Marder I being prepared to detrain

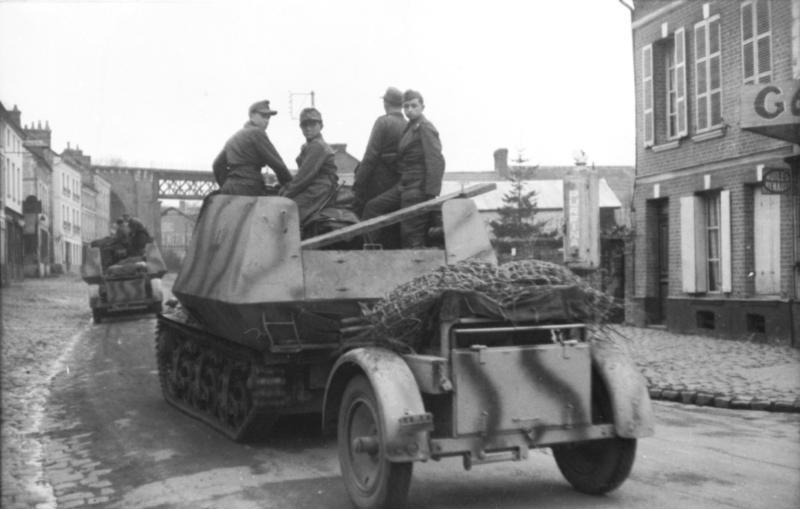
Marder I towing its ammunition trailer

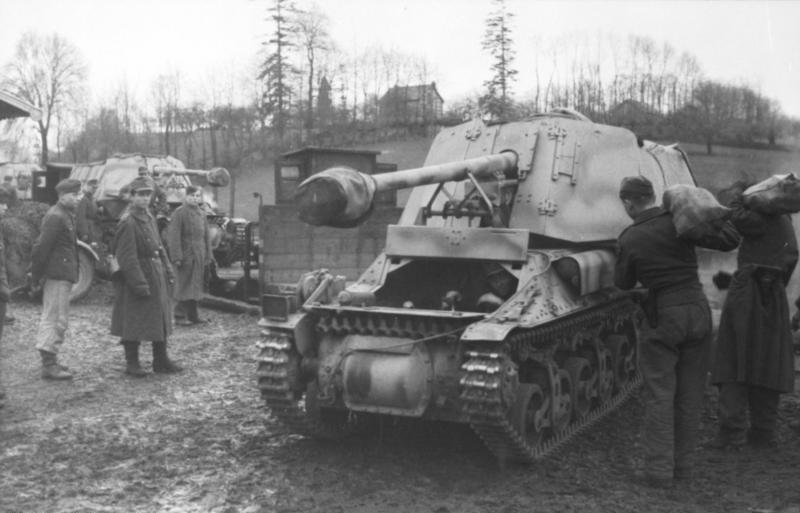
Marder I with driver visible

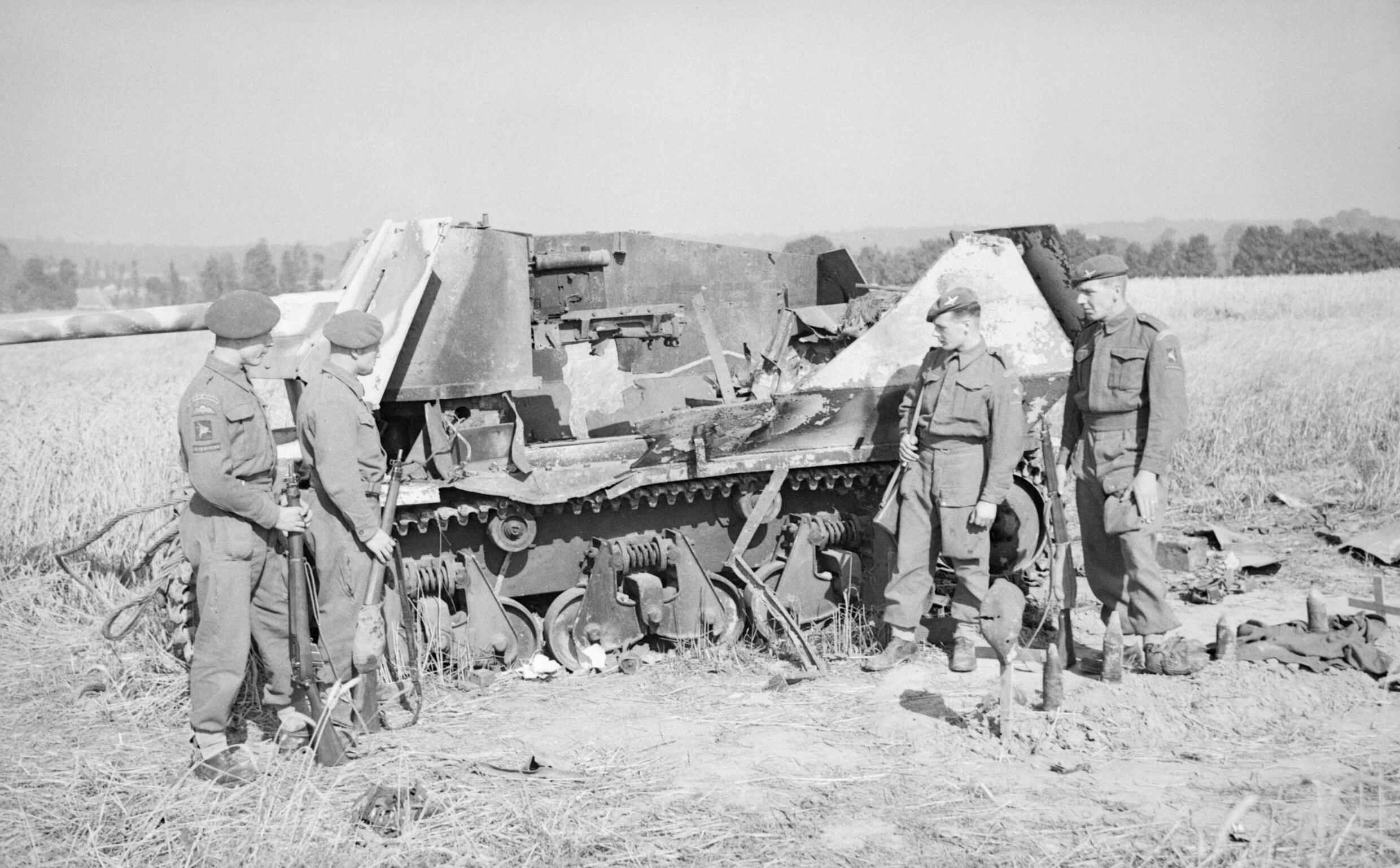
Men of the 6th Airborne Division investigate a Marder I (H39 chassis) they had destroyed

== See also ==
=== Comparable vehicles ===
- German Marder II and III
- Italian Semovente da 75/34
- Romanian TACAM T-60 and TACAM R-2
- Soviet SU-76 and ZiS-30
- Spanish Verdeja 75 mm
