= T38 =

T38 or T-38 may refer to:

== Aviation ==
- Allison T38, an American turboprop aircraft engine
- Northrop T-38 Talon, an American jet trainer aircraft
- Slingsby T.38 Grasshopper, a British training glider

== Other uses ==
- T38 (classification), a disability sport classification
- T.38, an ITU-T recommendation for fax transmission over IP
- Cooper T38, a British sports car
- T-38 tank, a Soviet light tank
- TACAM T-38, a Romanian tank destroyer
