= Marder III =

German Army tank destroyer

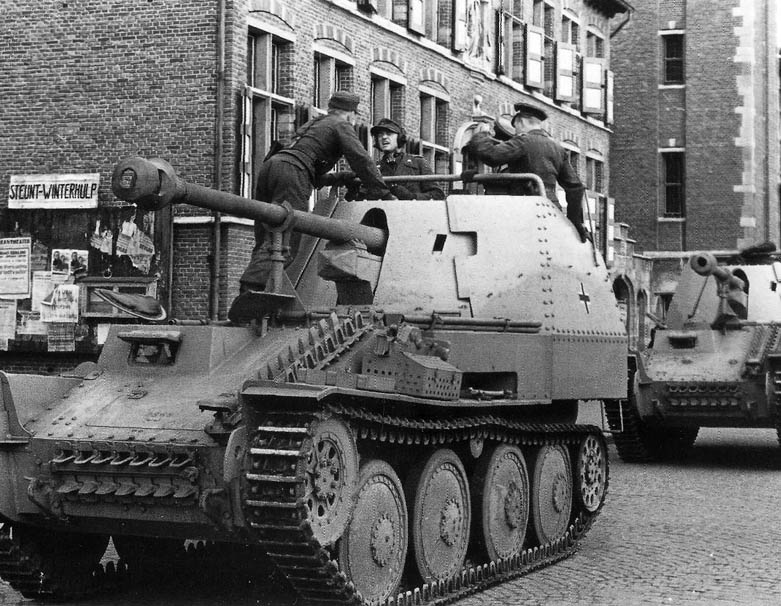
- Marder III Ausf. M
- Type: Tank destroyer
- Place of origin: Nazi Germany; German-occupied Czechoslovakia

Service history
- In service: 1942–1945
- Used by: Nazi Germany
- Wars: World War II

Production history
- Designed: 1942
- Manufacturer: BMM (ČKD)
- Produced: 1942–1944
- No. built: 1736 produced and converted: Sd. Kfz. 139: 344 produced; Sd.Kfz. 138, Ausf. H: 275 produced, 175 converted; Sd.Kfz. 138, Ausf. M: 942 produced

Specifications
- Mass: 10,670 kg (23,520 lb)
- Length: 4.65 m (15 ft 3 in)
- Width: 2.35 m (7 ft 9 in)
- Height: 2.48 m (8 ft 2 in)
- Crew: 4
- Armor: 10–50 mm
- Main armament: 7.62 cm PaK 36(r) (Sd.Kfz. 139); 7.5 cm PaK 40 (Sd.Kfz. 138 Ausf. H and M)
- Secondary armament: 7.92 mm MG 37(t), MG 34 or MG 42
- Engine: Praga Typ TNHPS-II / Praga AC water-cooled, 6-cylinder gasoline, 7.75 l 125–150 PS (123–148 hp; 92–110 kW)
- Power/weight: 14.1 PS (10.4 kW) / tonne
- Suspension: leaf spring
- Ground clearance: 40 cm (1 ft 4 in)
- Operational range: 190–210 km (120–130 mi)
- Maximum speed: 35–42 km/h (22–26 mph)

Marder III was the name for a series of German tank destroyers of the Second World War. The series mounted either the modified ex-Soviet 76.2 mm F-22 Model 1936 divisional field gun, or the German 7.5 cm PaK 40, in an open-topped fighting compartment on top of the chassis of the Czechoslovak Panzer 38(t). They offered little protection to the crew, but added significant firepower, which was able to destroy the thickly-armored T-34s, compared to contemporary German tanks. They were in production from 1942 to 1944 with three variants, the Marder III, Marder III Ausf. H, and Marder III Ausf. M, and served on all fronts until the end of the war, along with the similar Marder II. The German word Marder means "marten" in English.

== History ==
In the early stages of Operation Barbarossa, the Wehrmacht felt the need for a more mobile and more powerful anti-tank solution than the existing towed anti-tank guns, such as the 3.7 cm Pak 36, or self-propelled tank destroyers, such as the Panzerjäger I (mounted with the 4.7 cm PaK (t)). This need became urgent in 1942, when anti-tank shells fired from said anti-tank guns failed to penetrate the armor of new Soviet tanks, such as the T-34 and KV-1.

As an interim solution, it was decided to use captured French vehicles, such as the Lorraine (Marder I), obsolete tanks in surplus, such as the German Panzer II (Marder II), and Czech-"supplied" Panzer 38(t) (Marder III) as the base for the production of makeshift tank destroyers. The result was the Marder series, which were armed with either captured Soviet 76.2mm F-22 Model 1936 divisional field guns, or German 7.5 cm PaK 40 anti-tank guns mounted in later versions. Due to weight, space, and time constraints, the Marder series had relatively thin armor when compared with other armored vehicles of the era. This thin upper armor formed a gunshield, only protecting the crew from shrapnel and small arms fire on the front and sides. All Marder series had open tops—although some were issued with canvas tops to protect the crew from the elements. In this regard, the Marder was more of a gun carriage than a proper Panzerjäger that could exchange fire with enemy tanks.

== Development ==
=== Marder III, Sd.Kfz. 139 ===
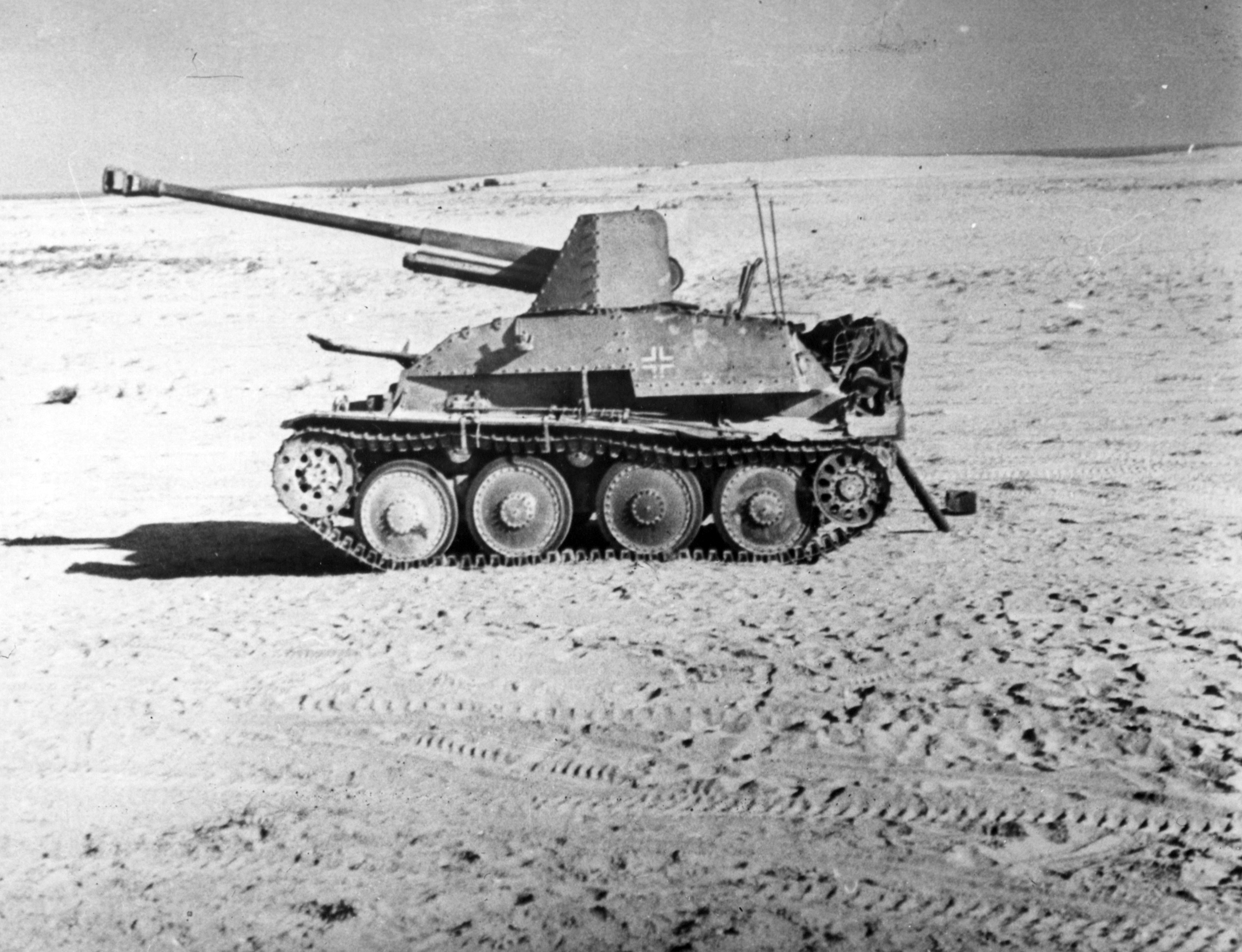
Marder III with 7.62 cm Pak 36(r) in North Africa

By December 1941 the Germans had captured large numbers of Soviet model 1936 76 mm divisional gun M1936 (F-22), which were re-purposed both as field cannon (FK) and anti-tank guns (Pak). According to notes in Franz Halder's War Diary for 28th August 1941, the 7.62 cm gun was originally a Krupp design sold to the Soviets after being rejected by the German Army's Ordnance Office.

The decision was made to mate this gun to the Panzer 38(t). The built-up gun tubes were rechambered by Rheinmetall-Borsig, being rebored to seat a longer cartridge case, since the more powerful projectiles used by the Germans in the 7.5 cm Pak 40 were physically longer than the Soviet ones. A larger diameter driving band of 76.10 mm was installed on the armour-piercing Panzergranate 39 shells to compensate for the difference in caliber. A Solothurn muzzle brake was installed, and the gun was re-designated as the 7.62 cm Pak 36(r).

While the Panzer 38(t) had largely become obsolete as a tank in early 1942, it was still an excellent and plentiful platform for adaptation into a tank destroyer, among other roles. Mass production of the Panzer 38(t) Ausf. G was halted, and a modified superstructure was bolted onto the standard tank chassis in lieu of a gun turret. This upper structure mounted the gun and an extended gun shield, giving only limited protection for the commander, gunner, and the loader. Armor protection overall ranged from 10 to 50 mm, with no armor at all above and behind the gun compartment, which the crew occupied. It had a higher silhouette than the original Panzer 38(t), which made it more vulnerable to enemy fire.

Thirty rounds of ammunition were stored inside the vehicle. The HE Sprenggranate 39, the AP Panzergranate 39, and the tungsten-cored AP Pzgr 40 could be fired, but the latter was withdrawn from around 1943 due to a shortage of tungsten. In fact, the standard AP Panzergrante 39 was so effective even against the KV-1 that the Pzgr 40 was rarely needed. Apart from the main gun, there was a 7.92 mm MG 37 machine gun mounted in the hull. These vehicles had a Fu.Spr.d radio installed.

The original engine installed in the 38 series was the 6-cylinder gasoline Scania-Vabis 1662 of 7.75 litres, manufactured under license by BMM and given the designation Praga TNHPS. It developed around 125 PS @2200 rpm; however, the engine was governed at the factory to 2000 rpm, giving a maximum speed of 37.8 km/h. With a second carburetor the power output was increased to 150 PS @2500 rpm with improved fuel consumption, and a top speed of 47.25 km/h; designated as the Praga AC it was installed from July 1942 in the Ausf. H models with the Soviet 7.62 cm gun. However, the power increase couldn't be fully used because the Praga-Wilson transmission was limited to 2500 rpm.

The tropicalized Sd.Kfz 139 vehicles sent to fight in the North African Campaign had sealed engine and transmission components, better air filters and an improved cooling system, which had been tested in Kummersdorf in May 1942.

This self-propelled anti-tank gun was put into production as the Panzerjäger 38(t) für 7.62 cm PaK 36(r), Sd.Kfz. 139. A total of 344 vehicles were built in three series from April to November 1942. Chassis numbers were 1360–1479, 1527–1600, and 1601–1750. A further 40 or so vehicles were converted from older Panzer 38(t) gun tanks which had been sent back to the BMM factory for repair during 1943.

=== Marder III Ausf. H, Sd.Kfz. 138 ===
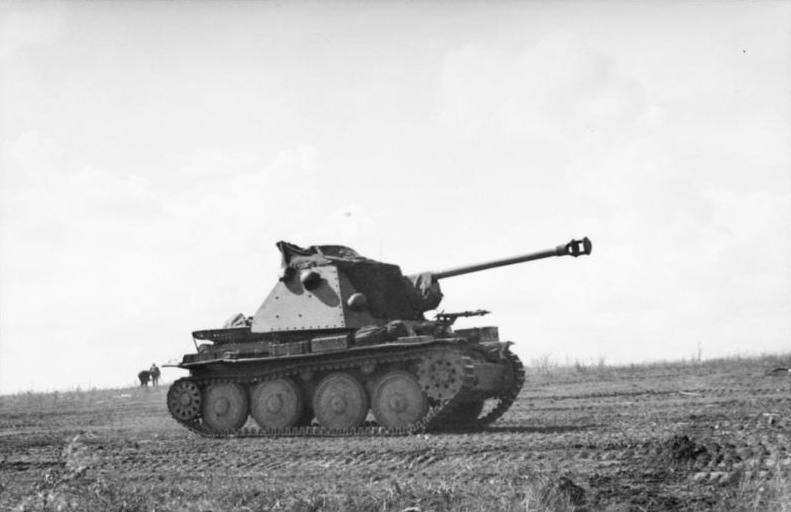
Marder III Ausf. H on the Eastern Front

This next variant of the Marder III fielded the standard 7.5 cm PaK 40 German anti-tank gun on a slightly modified Panzer 38(t) Ausf. H chassis. The first vehicles with the German gun were produced in November 1942. This chassis still had the engine in the rear of the vehicle, but, unlike the previous model, this vehicle utilized the fighting compartment of the Panzer 38 in the center, making it lower, lighter and with improved protection. This allowed the crew to stay low in the center of the vehicle, lowering their exposure to small arms fire and shell fragments. However, because of the rear-mounted engine, there was only enough room for two men to stand in the center. Large side armor gave additional protection for the crew. Despite this, the thin horseshoe-shaped armor only protected the front and sides; the rear and the top were exposed. Thirty-eight rounds of ammunition for the gun were carried. As with the Sd.Kfz.139, this vehicle also carried a Czech-manufactured 7.92 mm machine gun in the hull.

The Ausf. H had a Fu.5 radio fitted.

The full name of the Ausf. H was the 7.5 cm PaK 40/3 auf Panzerkampfwagen 38(t) Ausf. H, Sd.Kfz. 138. A total of 275 vehicles were built in two series from November 1942 to April 1943. An additional 175 vehicles were converted from Panzer 38(t)'s in 1943. Chassis numbers of new vehicles were 1751–2075 and 2121–2147 (overlapping with simultaneous Grille production).

=== Marder III Ausf. M, Sd.Kfz. 138 ===
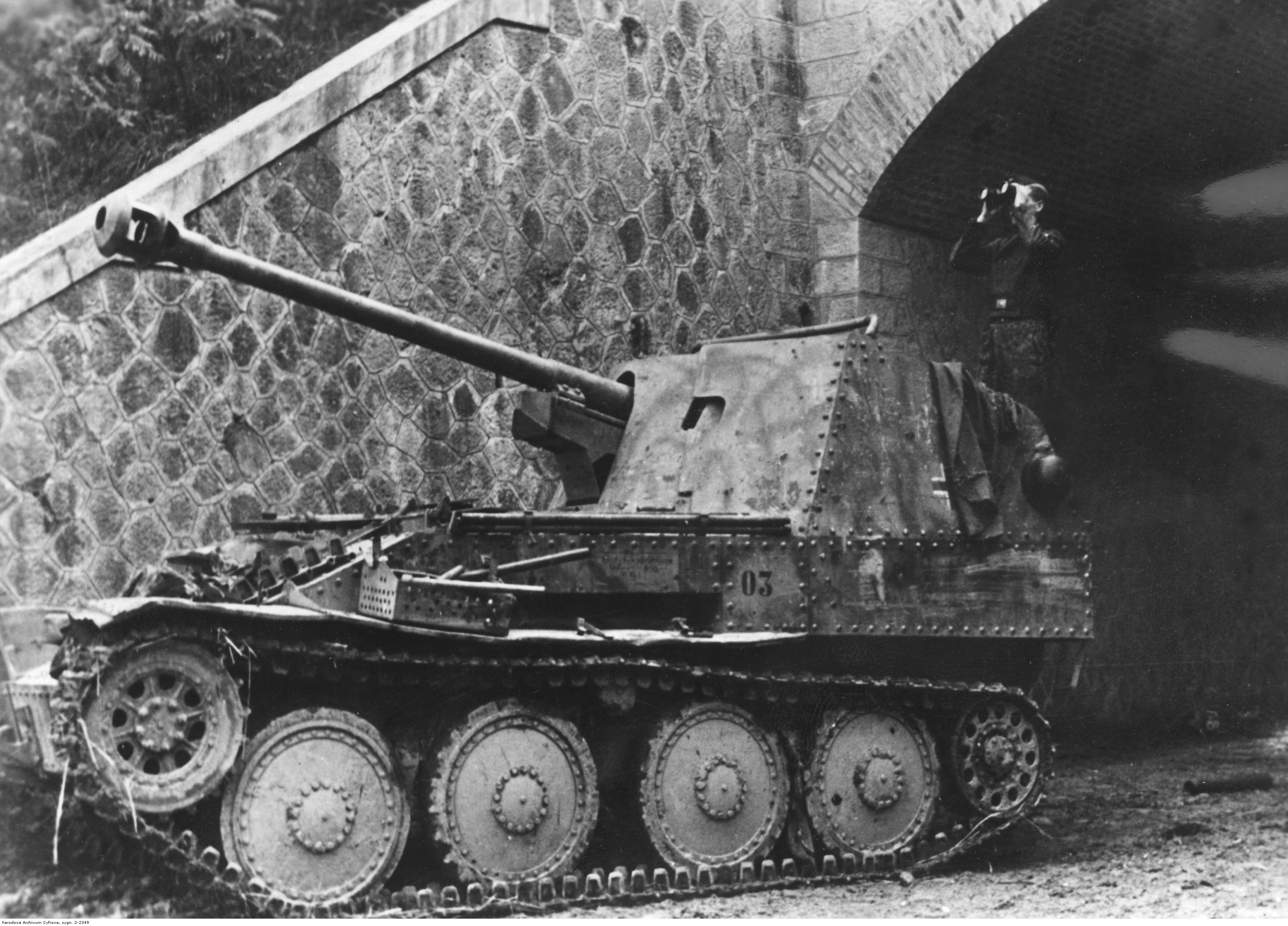
A Marder III Ausf. M on the Italian front, December 1944.

The last Marder III variant was based on the Geschützwagen 38(t) Ausf. M, a purpose-designed vehicle for self-propelled gun use, again armed with the 75 mm PaK 40 anti-tank gun.. Ausf. M was the final variant of the Marder series, and was a significant improvement over previous models, with its lower silhouette, sloped armor, and much more functional fighting compartment. In this variant, the engine was moved from the rear to the middle between driver and the rest of the crew. Because there was no engine in the rear, the gun and the crew did not have to sit on top of the engine deck as in previous models. The fighting compartment could be lowered down to the bottom floor level where the engine used to be, which decreased crew exposure and visibility. The gun was moved towards the rear of the vehicle, improving the weight distribution. Unlike the previous two Marder III variants, the fighting compartment was closed at the rear, protecting the crew up to their midsection. It stayed open-topped. The machine gun port at the front was eliminated in the Ausf. M in favor of an MG 34 or MG 42 carried by the crew. In the previous two models, the commander served as a gunner. However, in the Ausf. M, the radio man moved to the rear, with the commander and gunner, to serve as a loader. Only 27 rounds of 7.5 cm ammunition were carried, but combat effectiveness increased because the vehicle commander was freed from manning the gun.

For communications from around November 1943, the Ausf. M was fitted with a short-range Fu.5 radio set (standard issue for most Panzers and assault guns such as the StuG III): the company commander's vehicle also had a 30-Watt Fu.8 which enabled him to talk to the battalion, or perhaps divisional HQ. Some vehicles only had a Fu.Spr.f.

The full name of the Ausf. M was Panzerjäger 38(t) mit 7.5 cm PaK 40/3 Ausf. M, Sd.Kfz. 138 . It was the variant that was produced in the largest numbers, with 942 vehicles built in two series from May 1943 to May 1944. Chassis numbers were 2166–2600 and 2601–3600 (overlapping with simultaneous Grille and Flakpanzer 38(t) production).

== Combat history ==
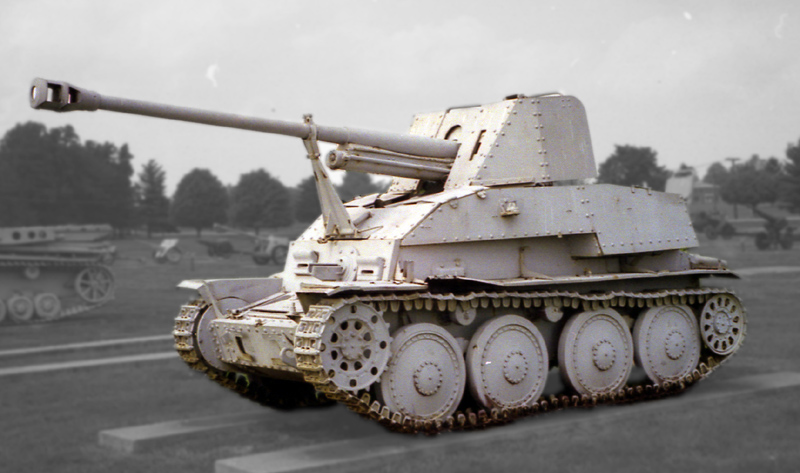
Marder III (Sd.Kfz.139) on display at the US Army Ordnance Museum in Aberdeen

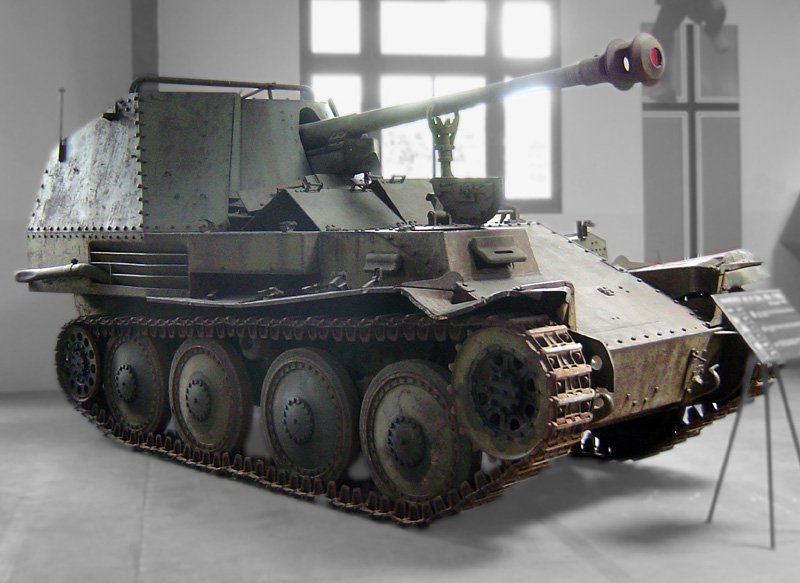
Marder III Ausf. M on display at the Musée des Blindés at Saumur

The various Marder IIIs fought on all European fronts and in North Africa, with the Sd. Kfz. 139 being used mainly at the Eastern Front, though 66 also fought in Tunisia, many with the 15th Panzer Division. In February 1945, some 350 Ausf. M were still in service.

The Marder IIIs were used by the Panzerjäger Abteilungen of the Panzer divisions of both the Heer and the Waffen SS, and a few Heer Infantry Divisions, as well as several Luftwaffe units, such as the Hermann Göring division.

The Marder IIIs were generally mechanically reliable, as with all vehicles based on the Czechoslovak LT-38 chassis. However, the suspension leaf springs on the Sd.Kfz. 139 were overtaxed because of the long gun and frequently broke, and spare parts weren't often available.

Their firepower was sufficient to destroy the majority of Soviet tanks on the battlefield at combat range, around 500 to 1000 meters. Although the short-barelled 5 cm gun of the Panzer IIIs were generally ineffective against the heavy Soviet tanks such as the KV-1, the AP shot from 7.62 cm gun was capable of penetrating 3.7 inches (94 mm) of vertical armour at 500 yards and 3.2 inches (81 mm) at 1000 yards. The gunsights were adequate up to around 1000 yards, but beyond that only lucky hits tended to occur at over 1200 yards. According to post-combat reports, greater magnification and a more accurate elevating mechanism would have had improved hits at up to 2000 yards. High-explosive Sprenggranaten 39 were used against infantry at ranges up to 2500 meters.

The Marders were especially effective when they followed behind the main tanks into battle and were then held ready for action. In defence, they were hidden from indirect fire and enemy observation, and then drove to pre-scouted positions when enemy tanks appeared.

The Marder III's weaknesses were mainly related to survivability. The combination of a high silhouette and open-top armor protection made them vulnerable to indirect artillery fire. The armor was also quite thin, making them highly vulnerable to enemy tanks, and to close-range machine gun fire. The relatively small amount of stored ammunition meant they needed to be replenished frequently: according to a company commander of Panzerjäger-Abteilung 43 in November 1942, the 1-ton Sd.Kfz. 10 proved quite useful in this respect.

The Marders were not assault vehicles or tank substitutes; the open top meant that operations in urban areas or other close-combat situations were very risky. They were best employed in defensive or overwatch roles. Using them as some sort of improved infantry gun soon led to their loss. Despite their mobility, they did not replace the towed antitank guns.

In March 1942, before the Marder III appeared, Germany had already started production of the StuG III assault gun, which had comparable anti-tank capability (StuG III Ausf. F and later variants). These were fully armored vehicles, with the fighting compartment fully enclosed within an armored casemate, built in much greater numbers than the vulnerable Marder III. Among the many German casemated tank destroyers, one based on the Panzer 38(t) chassis was built in numbers from 1944: the Jagdpanzer 38(t). The weakly-armored Marder series were phased out of production in favor of the Jagdpanzer 38(t), but Marder series vehicles served until the end of the conflict.

=== Slovak National Uprising ===
In June 1944, the army of the Slovak Republic received 18 Marder III Ausf. H. Four of them saw combat during the Slovak National Uprising. Two vehicles were used by the partisan brigade Čapajev. One of them was destroyed between the towns Vranov nad Topľou and Prešov. The second Marder was used in heavy fights near Hermanovce nad Topľou. Its commander, Rajták, suffered a gunshot wound, and the vehicle was subsequently abandoned.

The remaining two Marders were used by the Slovak insurgent army near Strečno, and they played an important role in the Battle of Strečno Gorge. One of the Marders, under the command of Private Matej Buc, destroyed three German tanks and two anti-tank guns. During the German assault on 3 September, Commander Matej Buc and loader Štefan Kováč, who were sitting in an open hull, were shot. However, the driver, František Smolnický, survived and escaped from the battlefield with the vehicle. It was repaired and reused in battle, but on 8 and 9 September, both Marders were destroyed in battle—one near Vrútky, and other one near Priekopa.

== See also ==
=== Comparable vehicles ===
- German Marder I and II
- Romanian TACAM T-60 and TACAM R-2
- Soviet SU-76 and ZiS-30
- Spanish Verdeja 75 mm
- British Archer 17pdr, Valentine chassis

== Bibliography ==
- Chamberlain, Peter & Doyle, Hilary (1993). Encyclopedia of German Tanks of World War Two: A Complete Illustrated Directory of German Battle Tanks, Armoured Cars, Self-Propelled Guns and Semi-Tracked Vehicles, 1933–1945 (revised ed.). London: Arms and Armour. ISBN 1-85409-214-6.
- Gander, T. J (1973). German Anti-Tank Guns 1939–1945. London: Almark Publications. ISBN 0-85524-142-X.
- Halder, Franz (1948g). "Vol. VII: The Campaign in Russia. Part II: 1 August 1941–24 September 1942". War Journal of Franz Halder. Historical Division, Special Staff, United States Army (SS USA).
- Halder, Franz (1948h). "Vol. VIII: Footnotes". War Journal of Franz Halder. Historical Division, Special Staff, United States Army (SS USA).
- Jentz, Thomas L.; Doyle, Hilary Louis (2005a). Panzerjaeger (7.62 cm F.K.(r) auf gp.Sfl. to Marder 38T) development and employment from 1941 to 1943. Panzer Tracts No. 7–2. Boyds, MD: Panzer Tracts. ISBN 0-9744862-9-9.
- Jentz, Thomas L.; Doyle, Hilary Louis (2011). Panzer Production from 1933 to 1945. Panzer Tracts No. 23. Boyds, Maryland: Panzer Tracts. ASIN B004WXA45C.
- Kliment, Charles K. & Francev, Vladimír (1997). Czechoslovak Armored Fighting Vehicles 1918-1948. Atglen, Pennsylvania: Schiffer Publishing. ISBN 0-7643-0141-1.
- Sawicki, Robert; Ledwoch, Janusz (2007). Mittlere Zgkw 5t Sd.Kfz. 6. Militaria 287: Tank Power Vol. LVIII (in Czech and English). Warsaw: Wydawnictwo "Militaria". ISBN 9788372192875.
