= 7.62 cm Pak 36(r) =

7.62 cm FK 36(r) / Pak 36(r)
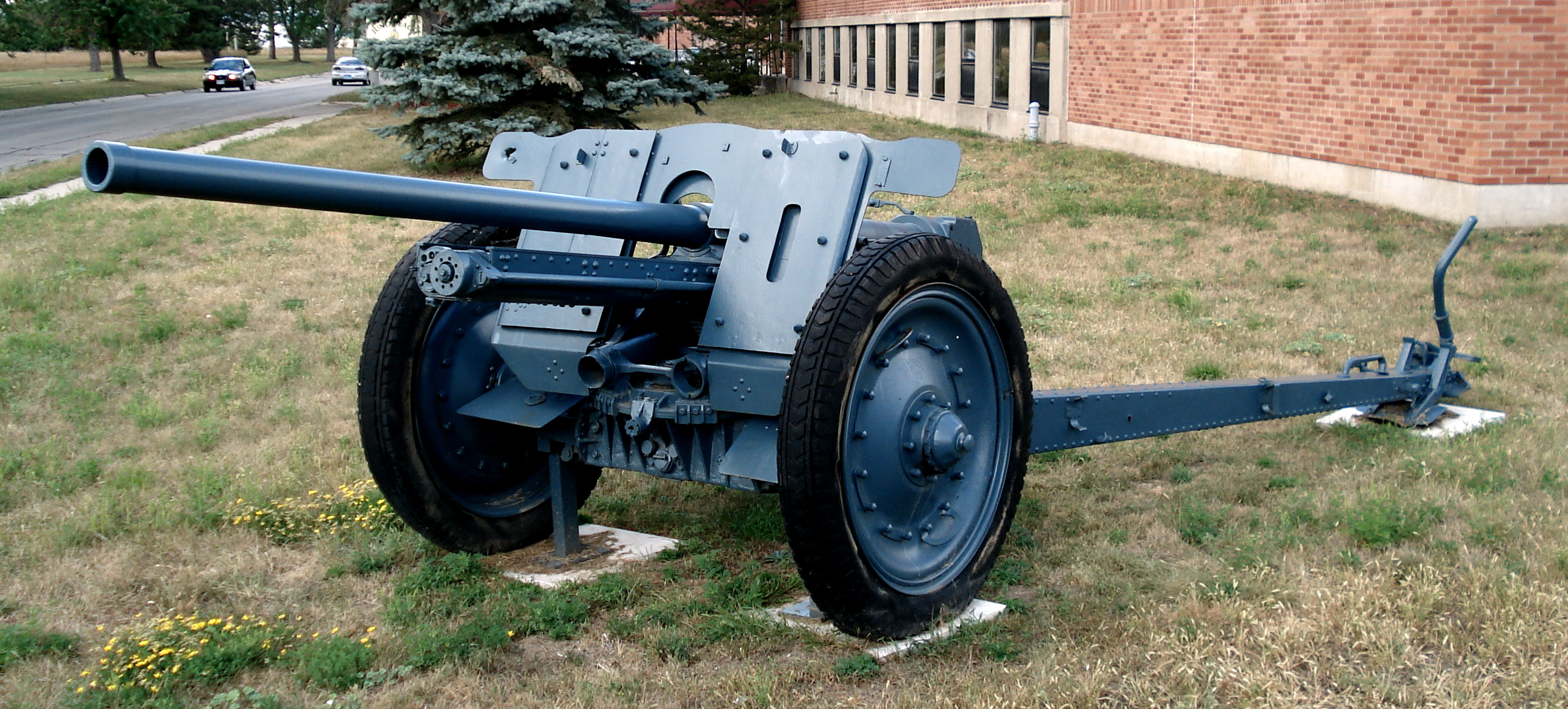
- FK 36(r) anti-tank gun, displayed on the grounds of CFB Borden.
- Type: Field gun Anti-tank gun
- Place of origin: Nazi Germany

Service history
- Used by: Nazi Germany; Bulgaria
- Wars: World War II

Production history
- No. built: ~560

Specifications
- Mass: 1,710 kg (3,770 lbs)
- Barrel length: Overall: 3.8 m (12 ft 6 in) L/51.2 (without muzzle brake); Bore: 3.68 m (12 ft 1 in) L/48.4
- Crew: 6
- Shell: FK 36(r): 76.2 x 385 mm R; Pak 36(r): 76.2 x 714 mm R
- Caliber: 76.2 mm (3 in)
- Breech: Vertical sliding-block
- Recoil: Hydro-pneumatic
- Carriage: Split trail
- Elevation: -6° to 18°
- Traverse: 60°
- Rate of fire: 10-12 rounds per minute

The 7.62 cm Feldkanone 36(russisch), abbreviated as 7.62 cm FK 36(r), and later Panzerabwehrkanone 36(russisch) or 7.62 cm Pak 36(r) were conversions of captured Soviet 76 mm divisional gun M1936 (F-22) used by Germany in World War II,

The 7.62 cm FK 36(r), which used Soviet ammunition was classified as a field gun (Feldkanone). When the guns were adapted to use the same ammunition as the 7.5 cm Pak 40 they were anti-tank guns

Later in the war, the Soviet 76 mm divisional gun M1939 (USV) were also converted in a similar way as the 7.62 cm FK 39(r) / Pak 39(r) (7.62 cm Panzerabwehrkanone [Anti-tank gun] 39(russisch) / Feldkanone [Field gun] 39(russisch)).

== Description ==
The FK36(r) and Pak 36(r) both had a split-trail carriage with a transverse leaf spring axle suspension, and steel wheels, with foam rubber filled tires. The guns were equipped with a semi-automatic vertical breech block; the recoil mechanism consisted of a hydraulic recoil buffer and a hydropneumatic recuperator. There was no limber; therefore the gun could not be towed by a horse team.

== Development history ==
=== FK 36(r) ===
Soon after the German invasion of the USSR in 1941, Wehrmacht units encountered new Soviet tanks: the medium T-34 and the heavy KV. The thick sloped armor of these vehicles gave them a good degree of protection against German anti-tank weapons. The situation eventually led to requests for more powerful guns that would be able to destroy them from long range. Germany already had a suitable design, the 7.5 cm Pak 40, entering production in late 1941, but the first pieces were not delivered until 1942. Until enough of these could be manufactured, expedient solutions were required.

In the early stages of Operation Barbarossa, the Germans captured a large number (approximately 1,300) of Soviet 76-mm divisional guns model 1936 (F-22). Developed with anti-tank abilities in mind, this Soviet gun had powerful ballistics; it was also originally intended to use a more powerful cartridge than the one eventually adopted. However, the design had some shortcomings in the anti-tank role: the shield was too high, the two man laying was inconvenient and the sighting system was more suitable for the F-22's original divisional field gun role. Using considerable thrift, German engineers were able to quickly modify the F-22, which by that time had been adopted in original form as the FK296(r) by the Wehrmacht. In late 1941, German engineers developed a modernization program. The initial modifications that brought the guns to FK36(r) standard included:

- removing the top section of the shield and using the armour off-cuts to superimpose over the lower section of the shield. These were held in place using the standard Pak38 shield pintles.
- re-orienting the traverse gear box and handwheel shaft linkages so as to mount the traverse handwheel on the left side of the gun next to the sight. As the new transverse rod linkage went through a gap in the recoil cradle's elevation arc, the maximum elevation angle was limited to 18 degrees.
- replacing the Russian sight with a Pak 38 style anti-tank sighting block that could mount the standard ZF3x8 sighting telescope or an emergency fold out iron sight. Like the Pak 40 and Pak 97/38, the sight mount had provision for attaching an indirect sighting device - the Aushilfsrichtmittel 38 (ARM38).

The first of these converted F-22s retained the original Russian ammunition (confirmed by measuring the chamber length of 15.2 inches or 385 mm) and were still designated FK296(r) on the sight's range drum. These early anti-tank conversions are discernible as they have not been fitted with a muzzle brake. These intermediate guns had various designations, but appear mainly to have been referred to as "FK36(r)", despite their dedicated anti-tank role seeming to warrant the designation "Pak" rather than "FK". The conversion work was performed by HANOMAG, with sight blocks made by Kerner & Co in 1942 (ggn42).

=== Pak 36(r) ===
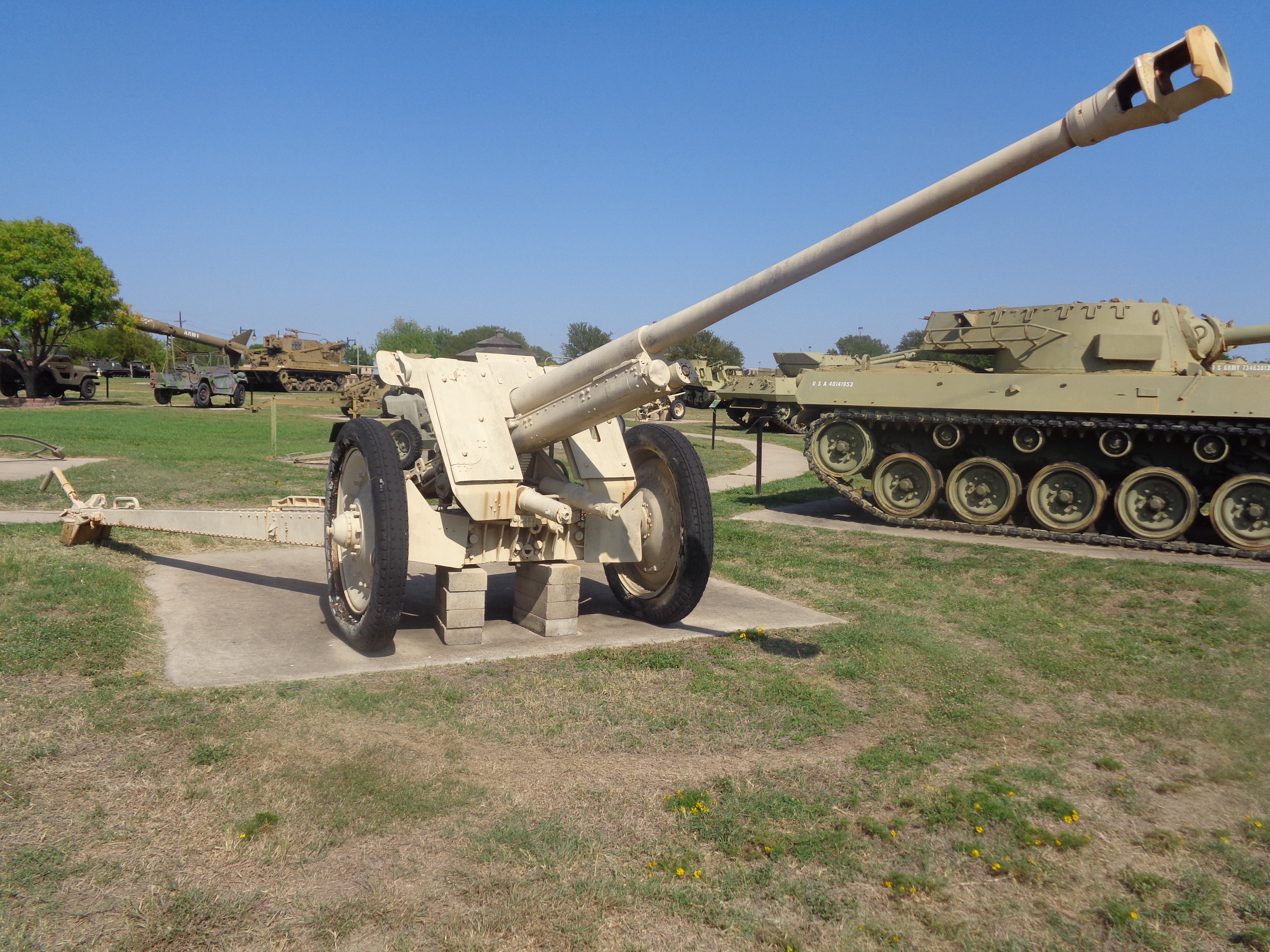
Pak 36(r) at the 3rd Cavalry Museum.

Upgraded FK 36(r) were designated as the Pak 36(r). Upgrades included:

- Rechambering for the more powerful German Pak40 cartridge - which was nearly twice as long as the Soviet one (715 mm vs 385.3 mm) and also wider (100 mm vs 90 mm), resulting in 2.4 times the propellant load; and
- Recoil mechanism adjustments to accommodate the new recoil characteristics.
- The addition of a German muzzle brake to further reduce recoil.

== 7.62 cm Pak 39(r) ==
7.62 cm Pak 39(r)
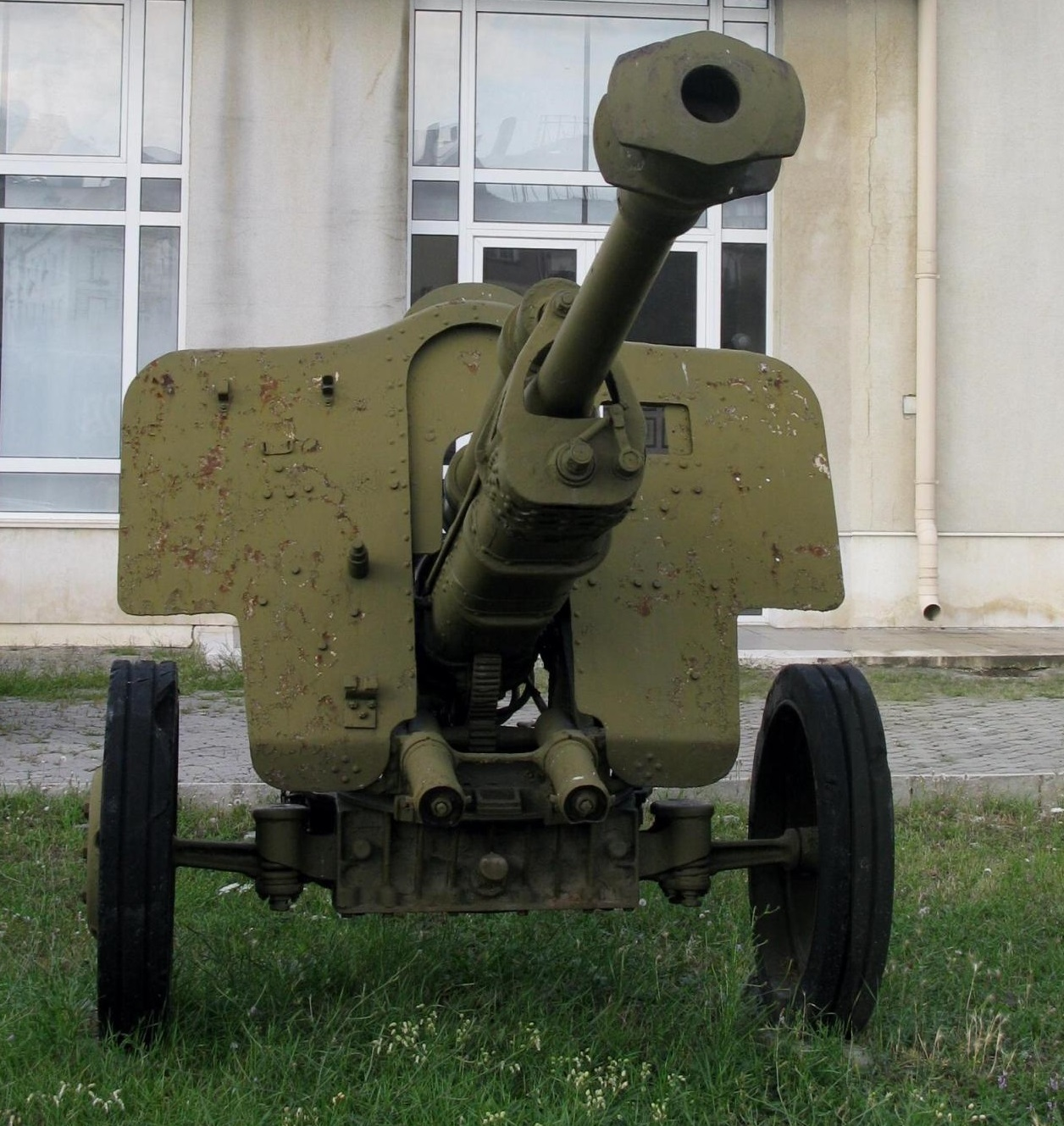
- 7.62 cm Pak 39(r) in the National Museum of Military History, Sofia.
- Type: Field gun Anti-tank gun
- Place of origin: Nazi Germany

Service history
- Used by: Nazi Germany
- Wars: World War II

Production history
- No. built: ~300

Specifications
- Mass: combat:1,470 kg (3,240 lb) travel:2,500 kg (5,500 lb)
- Length: 5.95 m (19 ft 6 in)
- Barrel length: 3.2 m (10 ft 6 in) L/42
- Width: 1.94 m (6 ft 4 in)
- Height: 1.7 m (5 ft 7 in)
- Crew: 5
- Shell: 76.2 x 714 mm R
- Caliber: 76.2 mm (3 in)
- Breech: Vertical sliding-block
- Recoil: Hydro-pneumatic
- Carriage: Split trail
- Elevation: -6° to 18°
- Traverse: 60°
- Rate of fire: 15 rounds per minute

In German service, Some 76 mm USV divisional guns were converted to anti-tank guns, designated 7.62 cm Pak 39(r) (or 7.62 cm FK 39(r)). The modifications, which along other small improvements on the field, included the addition of a German muzzle brake, elevation controls moved to the left side of the barrel where the sights resided, the gun were drilled out to the longer 714mm casing, like already the 7,62 cm Pak 36(r).

The exact number of converted pieces is unknown; according to some sources there were up to 300. Anti-tank performance is also hard to determine. During trials held in 1943 a projectile from a captured gun penetrated the front armor of the KV tank (75 mm at 60°) from 600 m.

By March 1944, the Germans still had 359 such guns (including unconverted USV guns), of which 24 were in the East, 295 in the West, and 40 in Denmark.

== Production ==
The first guns were delivered in February 1942. By the end of 1942, the Germans had converted 358 pieces, with another 169 in 1943 and 33 in 1944. Additionally, 894 barrels were prepared for use in self-propelled guns. It is likely that these numbers include Pak 39(r), a similarly upgraded 76 mm M1939 gun.

Production of the ammunition for PaK 36(r) and PaK 39(r)
Shell type	1942	1943	1944	Total
HE-Frag	769,400	1,071,300	857,700	2,698,400
AP, all types	359,400	597,300	437,300	1,394,000

== Employment ==
The FK 36(r) and PaK 36(r) saw combat on the Eastern Front and in North Africa. The first employment of the FK36(r) was noted as early as March 1942 at Bir Hacheim in Libya; and, by May 1942, 117 are recorded as being in use by the Afrika Korps. The gun was well proven in combat, as demonstrated by Gunner Günter Halm (Knights Cross), who destroyed nine Valentine Tanks in a single action. The Pak 36(r) was used later in the North African campaign. The gun was actively used in both anti-tank and field artillery roles until the end of the war. As late as March 1945, the Wehrmacht still possessed 165 Pak 36(r) and Pak 39(r). The scale of use can be illustrated by the amount of ammunition consumed: 49,000 AP and 8,170 subcaliber AP shells in 1942, and 151,390 in 1943. For the sake of comparison, in 1942 the Pak 40 fired 42,430 AP and 13,380 HEAT shells; in 1943 the numbers grew significantly, to 401,100 AP and 374,000 HEAT.

The modernized barrels were also mounted in the following self-propelled guns:

- Marder II, Sd.Kfz.132 (Panzerjäger II für 7.62 cm PaK 36(r)), a lightly armoured tank destroyer on a Panzer II light tank chassis.
- Marder III, Sd.Kfz.139 (Panzerjäger 38(t) für 7.62 cm PaK 36(r)), a lightly armoured tank destroyer on a Panzer 38(t) light tank chassis.
- 7.62 cm F.K. 36(r) auf gp. Sfl. Sd.Kfz.6/3
  (Full name: 7.62 cm F.K. 36(r) auf gepanzerte Selbstfahrlafette Sd.Kfz.6/3), a Panzerjäger constructed from a Sd.Kfz. 6 carrying a 7.62 cm FK 36(r) gun portée within an armoured superstructure. The gun was emplaced on the rear on its field carriage and 5 mm (0.20 in) thick armour plates were added to the sides and rear to augment the protection given by the gun shield. Nine were produced in 1941-42

A number of Pak 36(r) guns were captured by the Red Army (e.g. in the Battle of Stalingrad) and were adopted by anti-tank battalions.

== Summary ==
When the FK36(r) and Pak 36(r) reached the battlefield, they were able to destroy any contemporary tank at normal combat ranges. Although the guns were heavier and had somewhat smaller penetration figures than the purpose-built Pak 40, there is no doubt that the modernization of the F-22 provided the Wehrmacht with a very effective anti-tank gun at only a fraction of the cost of producing one from scratch.

== Ammunition ==
=== German ammunition ===
Available ammunition
Type	Model	Weight (kg)	Core		Muzzle velocity (m/s)	Range (m)
Type	Model	Weight (kg)	Filler	Weight (g)	Muzzle velocity (m/s)	Range (m)
Armor-piercing shells
APCBC/HE	7.62 cm Pzgr.39 Rot	7.6	H.10	20	740	4,000
APCBC/HE	7.62 cm Pzgr.39	7.1	Fp.02, Np.10 (TnTa)	80 (102.4)	740	4,000
APCR	7.62 cm Pzgr.40	4.15	28x111mm Tungsten Core	900	990	700
HEAT shells
HEAT	7.62 cm Gr.38 Hl/С	5.05	H.10 (TnTa)	515 (875.5)	450	1,000
High explosive and fragmentation shells
HE	7.62 cm Sprgr.39	6.25	Fp.02, Np.10 (TnTa)	585 (748.8)	550	10,000

== Armor penetration performance ==
Armor penetration table (Note: These data were obtained using German methods of armor penetration measurement. Exact figures depend on the production batch of the projectiles and the technology used in the manufacture of the armour.)
7.62 cm Pzgr.39
Range	Contact angle	
Range	60°, mm	90°, mm
0	108	133
457 m (500 yd)	98	120
915 m (1,001 yd)	88	108
1,372 m (1,500 yd)	79	97
1,829 m (2,000 yd)	71	87
7.62 cm Pzgr.40
Range	Contact angle	
Range	60°, mm	90°, mm
0	152	190
457 m (500 yd)	118	158
915 m (1,001 yd)	92	130
1,372 m (1,500 yd)	71	106
1,829 m (2,000 yd)	55	84

The HEAT projectiles penetrated about 100–115 mm at a contact angle of 90°.

== Photo gallery ==
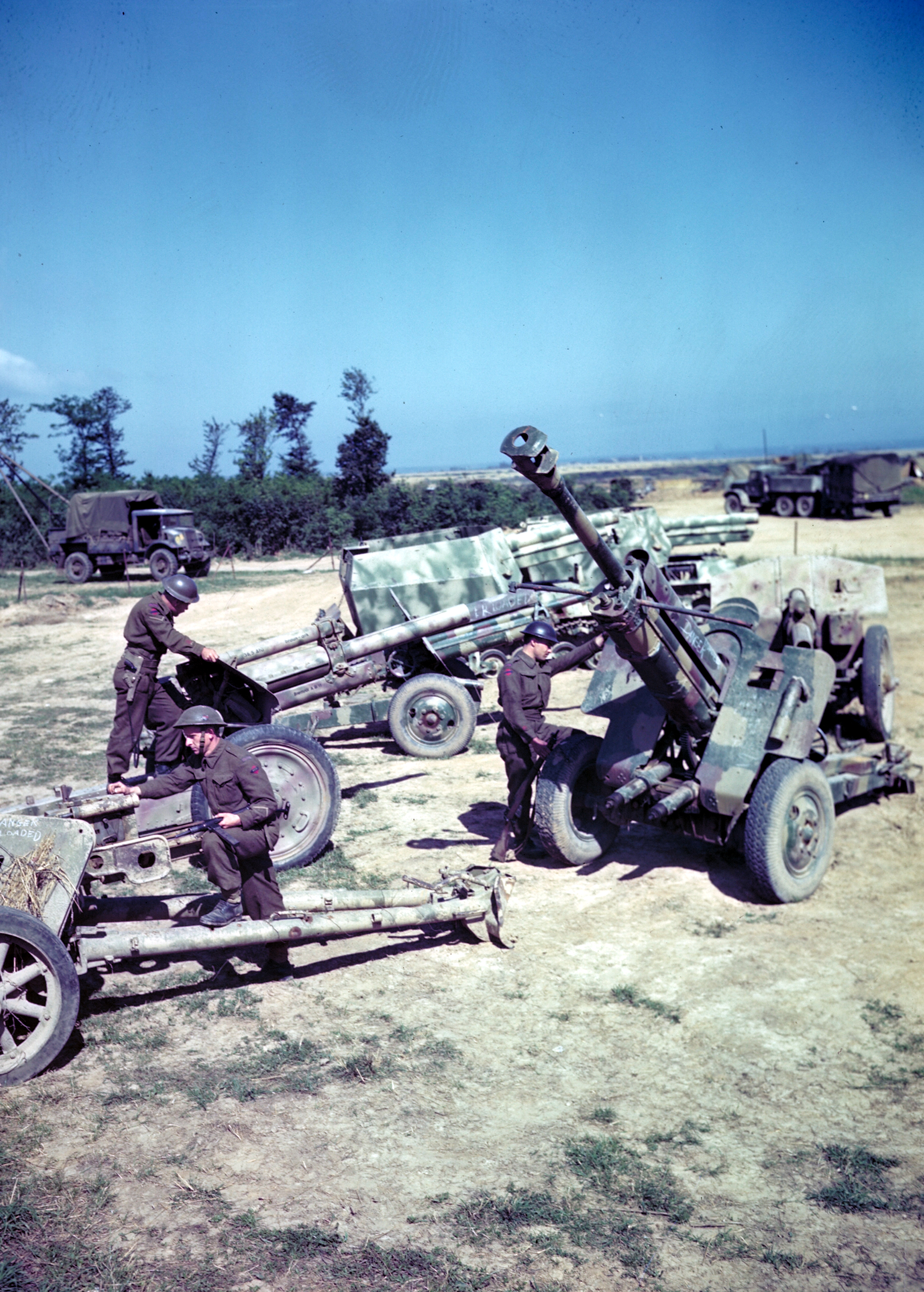
German Pak 39(r) (Converted ex-Soviet F-22 USV gun) and others, captured by Allies in Summer 1944.

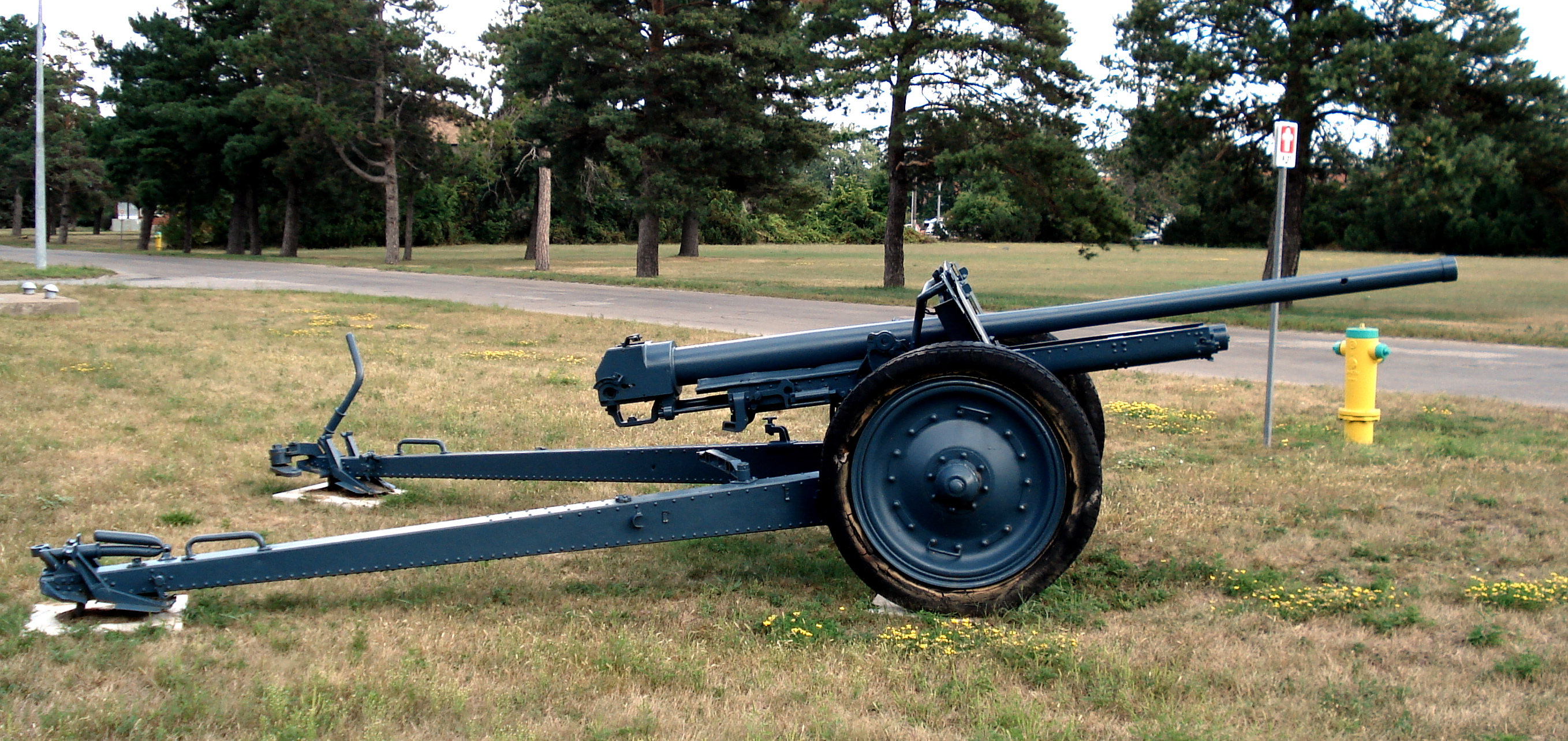
FK 36(r), CFB Borden.

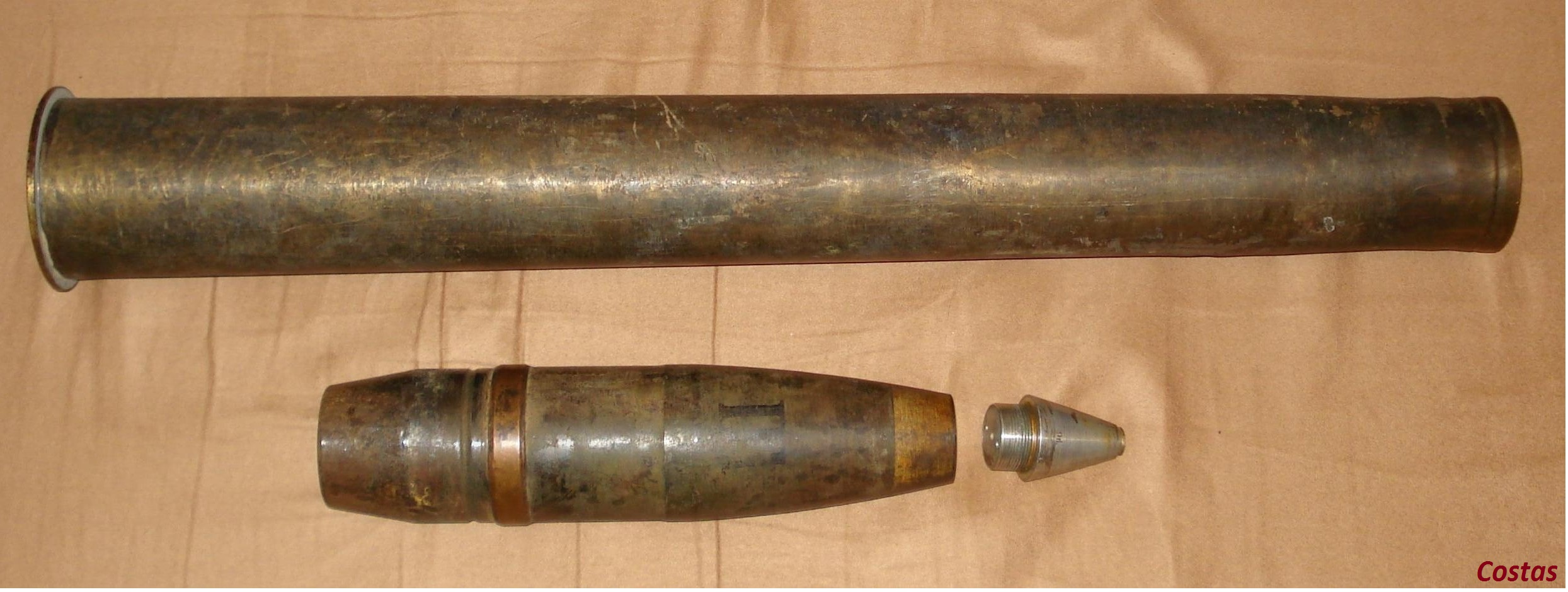
Brass-washed steel case and HE-shell for the German 7,62 cm Pak. 36 anti-tank gun.

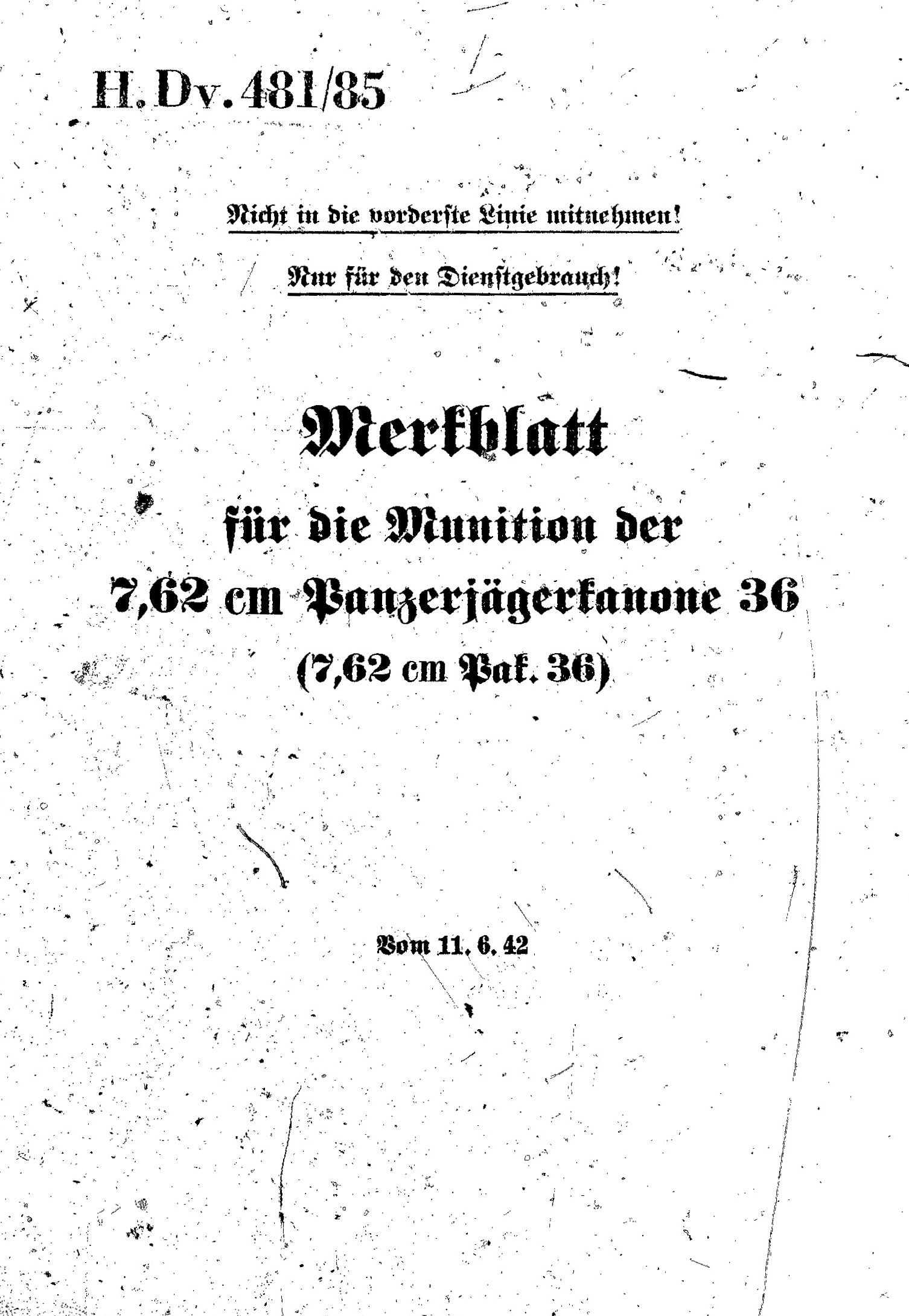
Brochure with description of ammunition to the 7,62 cm Panzerjägerkanone 36 anti-tank gun
