= TACAM T-60 =

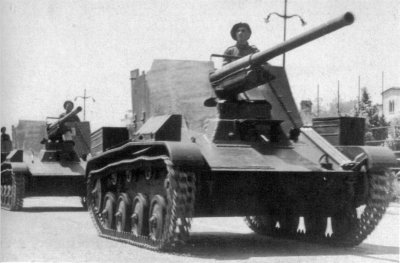
- A TACAM T-60 during the National Day parade, 10 May 1943
- Type: Tank Destroyer
- Place of origin: Romania (Note: Overall design, assembly, and certain parts.); Soviet Union (Note: Most of the parts, including the T-60 hull and the main gun.)

Service history
- In service: 1943—45
- Used by: Romania
- Wars: World War II

Production history
- Designer: Leonida; Nicholas Astrov (T-60)
- Designed: 1942—43
- Manufacturer: Atelierele Leonida; Factory 37, GAZ, Factory 38, Factory 264 (T-60)
- Produced: 1943
- No. built: 34 (or 51)
- Variants: TACAM T-60A; T-60

Specifications
- Mass: 9 tonnes (8.9 long tons; 9.9 short tons)
- Length: 4.24 metres (13.9 ft)
- Width: 2.35 metres (7.7 ft)
- Height: 2.31 metres (7.6 ft)
- Crew: 3
- Armor: 15–35 millimetres (0.59–1.38 in)
- Main armament: 1 x 76.2 mm Soviet M-1936 F-22 field gun
- Secondary armament: 1 x 7.92 mm ZB-53 machine gun 1 x submachine gun
- Engine: 6-cylinder, water-cooled GAZ 202; 80 horsepower (60 kW)
- Suspension: torsion bar
- Ground clearance: 33 centimetres (13 in)
- Fuel capacity: 280 litres (74 US gal)
- Operational range: 200 kilometres (120 mi)
- Maximum speed: On road: 40 kilometres per hour (25 mph) Off road: 20 km/h

The TACAM T-60 (Tun Anticar pe Afet Mobil T-60 – "Anti-tank gun on T-60 mobile gun carriage") was a Romanian tank destroyer used during World War II. It was built by removing the turret of captured Soviet T-60 light tanks and building a pedestal to mount a captured Soviet 76.2 mm (3.00 in) M-1936 F-22 field gun in its place. A three-sided fighting compartment was built to protect the gun and its crew. Thirty-four were built in 1943, and they served in the Jassy-Kishniev Offensive, and the Budapest Offensive.

== Development ==
By December 1942 it was blatantly obvious that Romania had nothing capable of defeating the modern Soviet medium and heavy tanks and was not likely to get anything capable of doing so from the Germans anytime soon. Romania had a number of captured modern Soviet tanks and field guns and it was decided to convert them to tank destroyers on the model of the German Marder II. The T-60 light tank was chosen because Romanian industry could maintain it, not least because its engine was a license-built Dodge-DeSoto-Fargo F.H.2 for which spares were available in both Romania and Germany. A captured Soviet 76.2-millimetre (3 in) M-1936 F-22 field gun was removed from its carriage and a new mount was fabricated to fit the gun to a turretless T-60. A fighting compartment was built using armor salvaged from captured Soviet tanks and the suspension was reinforced to handle its greater weight. Leonida finished the prototype on 19 January 1943.

The Romanians had unknowingly carried through with an unsuccessful Soviet project. In 1942, the Soviets attempted more than once to mount the same 76.2 mm field gun to the T-60 chassis, but failed due to the latter's supposedly inadequate size. Yet, the Romanians managed to successfully materialize the concept and even put it into serial (albeit limited) production.

Romanian industry was unable to maintain 16 Allied tanks and assault guns mounting guns of 75 mm or larger — six T-34s, two KV-1s, two T-28s, one IS-2, one ISU-152, and four M3 Lees — which Romania captured, relegating them to use only for anti-tank training. By converting 34 captured T-60 light tanks — the only captured enemy tanks Romanian industry could maintain — to carry a captured 76.2-mm field gun, creating the TACAM T-60, the Romanians more than made up for their inability to keep the 16 heavily armed captured Allied tanks and assault guns operational.

== Description ==
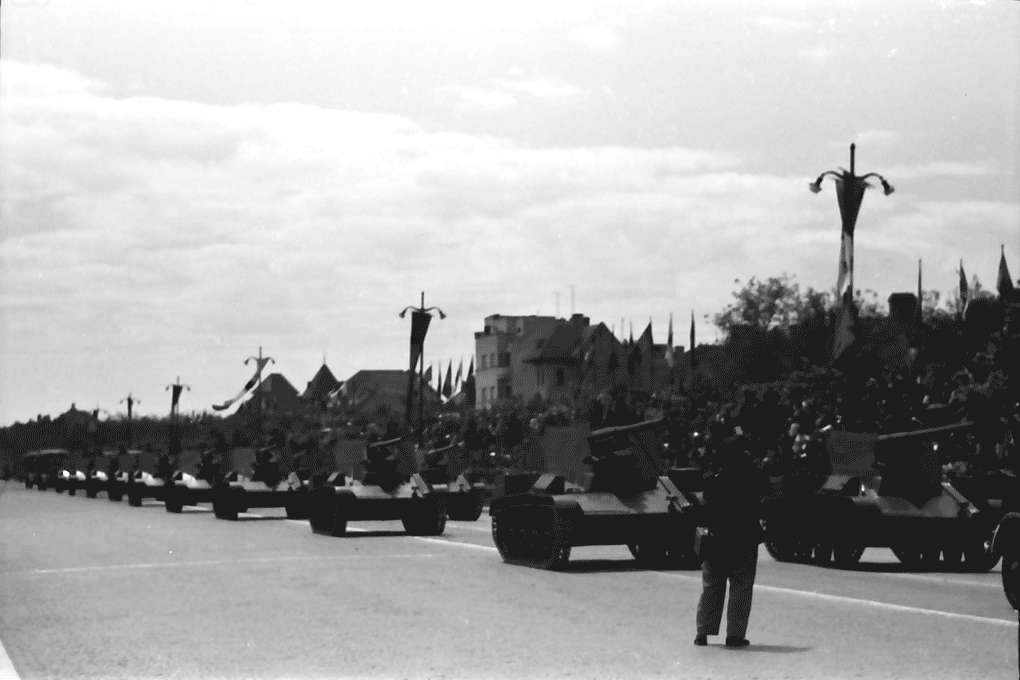
Another shot of the May 1943 parade

The TACAM T-60 had a M-1936 F-22 field gun mounted on a T-60 light tank chassis. The gun was removed from its carriage and mounted on a new pedestal that mated to the chassis. The gun-laying mechanism was modified to suit Romanian practices and a recoil guard was added to protect the gunner. The gun was protected by a three-sided, fixed gun shield with sides 15 millimetres (0.59 in) thick. The armor plate for the gun shield was salvaged from captured Soviet BT-7 cavalry tanks. The gun could traverse 32°, elevate 8° and depress 5°. A total of forty-four rounds were carried for the main gun. The tank destroyer's secondary armament consisted of one ZB-53 heavy machine gun and one submachine gun. The chassis was modified for its new role; a new engine cover was made to improve engine cooling and the interior was modified to add more ammunition storage. The extra weight of the gun required that the suspension be modified with stronger torsion bars and new road wheels. A brake to lock the wheels while firing was also added. The armor of the hull ranged from 15 to 35 millimetres (0.59 to 1.38 in) thick. It could cross a ditch 1.3 metres (4.3 ft) wide, climb an obstacle .5 metres (1.6 ft) high and ford a stream .6 metres (2.0 ft) deep. The new vehicle weighed 9 tons fully loaded and required a crew of 3 to operate. It measured 4.24 meters in length (5.51 meters including the gun), 2.35 meters in width and 1.75 meters in height, with a ground clearance of 0.33 meters. Its 6-cylinder, water-cooled GAZ 202 engine generated an output of 80 hp which provided the vehicle with a top speed of 40 km/h on road and 20 km/h off road, as well as an operational range of 200 km on road and 150 km off road (fuel capacity was of 280 litres of petrol).

== Operational history ==
A total of thirty-four were converted by Leonida in Bucharest by the end of 1943. Sixteen were assigned to the 61st Tacam Company which was assigned to the 1st Armored Regiment and eighteen were organized into the 62nd Tacam Company and assigned to the 2nd Armored Regiment. Despite these nominal assignments the TACAM T-60s were assigned as needed. The ad hoc Cantemir Armored Group was formed on 24 February 1944 to reinforce the defenses of Northern Transnistria from elements of the 1st Armored Division and included fourteen TACAM T-60s in two batteries. This was later returned to its parent 1st Armored Division and the tank destroyers fought with the division during the Soviet Jassy-Kishniev Offensive.

Nothing is known about any action immediately after Romania's defection to the Allies in late August 1944 or in the defense of Romania during the following month, but it seems likely that all surviving vehicles were repossessed by the Soviets during October 1944.

== TACAM T-60A ==
The vehicle was not only produced on the chassis of the T-60, but also on the chassis of the T-60A, a T-60 version with thicker frontal armor and disc road wheels. This version was called TACAM T-60A. Not much is known about these vehicles or about their action on the front.

== Other Romanian tank destroyers based on captured T-60s ==
Because the T-60 was the sole captured Allied tank which the Romanian industry could maintain, it served as a platform for further Romanian tank destroyer projects. Two T-60s were each fitted with one captured Soviet 122 mm M1910/30 howitzer and one 7.92 mm ZB-53 machine gun to serve as the first two prototypes of the Mareșal tank destroyer. The two prototypes, M-00 and M-01, were however different. The first used a standard T-60 chassis and a Ford V8 85 hp engine, while the other used an enlarged and reinforced T-60 chassis with a Buick 120 hp engine. Both vehicles - fully enclosed in armor - weighed 6.7 tons.

== See also ==
- TACAM R-2 (Similar tank destroyer conversion project using the chassis of the Panzer 35(t))
- TACAM T-38 (Proposal for a similar tank destroyer conversion)
- TACAM R-1 (Proposal for a similar tank destroyer conversion)
- Vânătorul de care R35 (Upgunned Renault R35)
- Mareşal tank destroyer (Prototype tank destroyer project)

=== Tanks of comparable role, performance and era ===
- German Marder II
- Italian Semovente da 75/34
- Japanese Type 1 Ho-Ni I
- Soviet SU-76
- Soviet ZiS-30
- Spanish Verdeja 75 mm
