= Marder II =

German Army tank destroyer

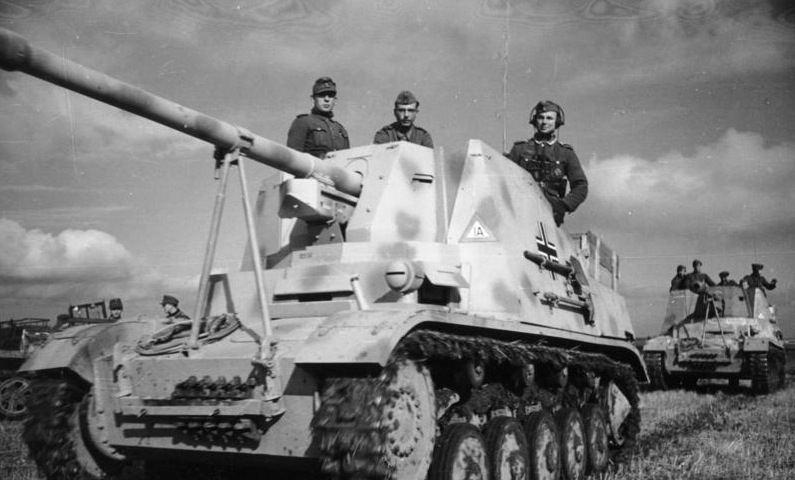
- This Marder II (Sd.Kfz. 131) was nicknamed "Kohlenklau" (Coal thief), after a propaganda caricature which was very popular in Germany from 1942 onward.
- Type: Tank destroyer
- Place of origin: Nazi Germany

Service history
- In service: 1942–1945
- Used by: Nazi Germany

Production history
- Manufacturer: FAMO; FAMO-Ursus
- Produced: 1942–1943
- No. built: ~863 (681 built, ~182 converted)

Specifications
- Mass: 10.8 tonnes (23,809 lb)
- Length: 6.36 m (20 ft 10 in)
- Width: 2.28 m (7 ft 6 in)
- Height: 2.2 m (7 ft 3 in)
- Crew: 4
- Armor: Front 35 mm Sides 14.5 mm Rear 14.5 mm
- Main armament: 7.62 cm Pak 36(r) w/ 30 rounds (Sd.Kfz. 132); 7.5 cm Pak 40 gun w/ 37 rounds (Sd.Kfz. 131)
- Secondary armament: 7.92 mm MG 34
- Engine: Maybach HL 62 TRM 6-cylinder gasoline engine 138 hp (140 PS, 103 kW)
- Power/weight: 12.8 hp/tonne
- Suspension: Leaf spring
- Operational range: 190 km (118 mi)
- Maximum speed: 40 km/h (25 mph)

The Marder II (marten in English) was a German tank destroyer of World War II based on the Panzer II chassis. There were two versions, the first mounted a modified Soviet 7.62 cm gun firing German ammunition, while the other mounted the German 7.5 cm Pak 40 gun. Its high profile and thin open-topped armor provided minimal protection to the crew. Nevertheless, the Marder II (and similar Marder III) provided a great increase in firepower over contemporary German tanks during 1942 and into 1943. Only four Marder IIs remain today.

== History ==
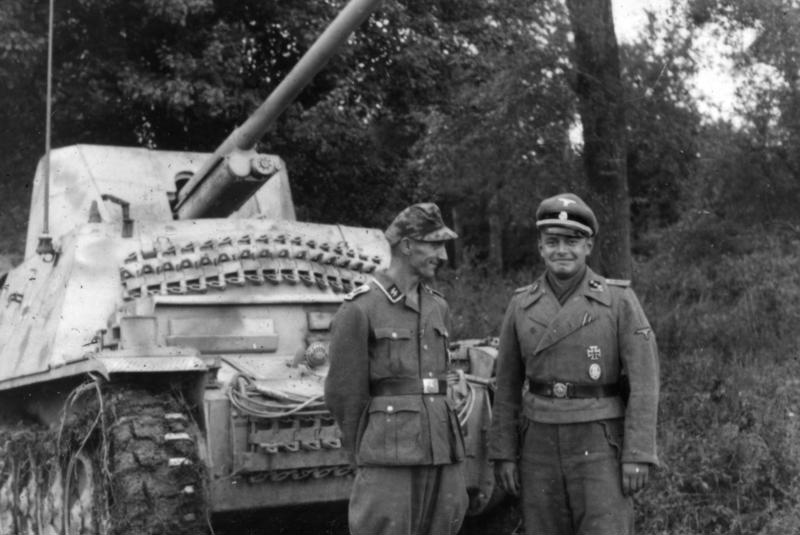
A Waffen-SS Marder II and its crew somewhere in Southern Russia during the Wehrmacht's raid into the Caucasus. The vehicle depicted is the Sd.Kfz. 132 variant, also known as a 'LaS76', based on the early Panzer II Ausf. D/E chassis mounting a captured Soviet 76 mm gun.

During the first days of Operation Barbarossa, the invasion of the Soviet Union, the Germans came unprepared to encounter Soviet T-34 medium tanks and KV heavy tanks. Although the Wehrmacht succeeded in most operations due to superior tactics, air support and supply, the lack of anti-tank weapons capable of successfully engaging these vehicles at range was becoming evident. An urgent need arose for a mobile and powerful enough anti-tank weapon than the existing towed anti-tank guns or tank destroyers like the Panzerjäger I.

Among a series of solutions, it was decided to use surplus light tanks, like the Panzer II, and captured vehicles, like the Lorraine Schlepper, as the basis for makeshift tank destroyers. The result was the Marder series, which were armed with either the new 7.5 cm Pak 40 anti-tank guns or captured Soviet 7.62 cm F-22 Model 1936 field guns, large numbers of which had been acquired early in the war.

In 1942, at least five Marder IIs were supplied by the Germans to their ally, Hungary. The Hungarians used these successfully against Soviet tanks on the Eastern Front. In 1943, a surviving Marder II was taken back to Hungary to be studied. Soon, the Hungarians designed and built a similar vehicle using the Hungarian Toldi light tank's chassis with a three-sided armoured superstructure housing a powerful 75 mm anti-tank gun mounted on top. This would be referred to as the 'Toldi páncélvadász' ('Toldi tank destroyer').

== Production ==
The Marder II came in two major versions. The first version (Sd.Kfz. 132) was based on the light Panzer II Ausf. D/E and Flammpanzer II chassis with a new torsion bar suspension featuring four large road wheels and a "slack track" with no track return rollers. It was armed with captured Soviet 7.62 cm guns that were rebuilt to accept the larger German 7.5 cm Pak 40 propellant cartridge. This improved its penetrative capabilities and eliminated the need for captured ammunition. These early Marder IIs had a high silhouette (2.60 m (8 ft 6 in) high) and relatively thin armor compared to other armored vehicles; only 30 mm (1.2 in) (front) and 10 to 15 mm (0.39 to 0.59 in) (sides). There was no armour on the top or rear, leaving the crew with very little protection. Alkett built 150 Marder II (Sd. Kfz. 132) in April/May 1942 and Wegmann converted further 52 from mid 1942 to 1943.

The second version (Sd.Kfz. 131) was based on new-built Panzer II Ausf. F hulls. This Marder II had a redesigned (widened) fighting compartment and used the German 75 mm Pak 40 anti-tank gun. The silhouette was lowered by about 40 cm to 2.20 m, but the armor was thin and the compartment was open to the top and rear, as in Sd. Kfz. 132. Famo (Breslau), and FAMO-Ursus produced 531 Marder II (Sd.Kfz. 131) from July 1942 to June 1943. About 130 more were converted from mid 1943 to early 1944 when the last Panzer IIs were taken out of active service. There was also a version made with the 50 mm pak 38, these were made because of a lack of the 75mm pak 40. A different superstructure was also made to accommodate the new gun, this resulting in a new version called the 5 cm pak 38 auf p.z kpfw Marder II.

== Combat history ==
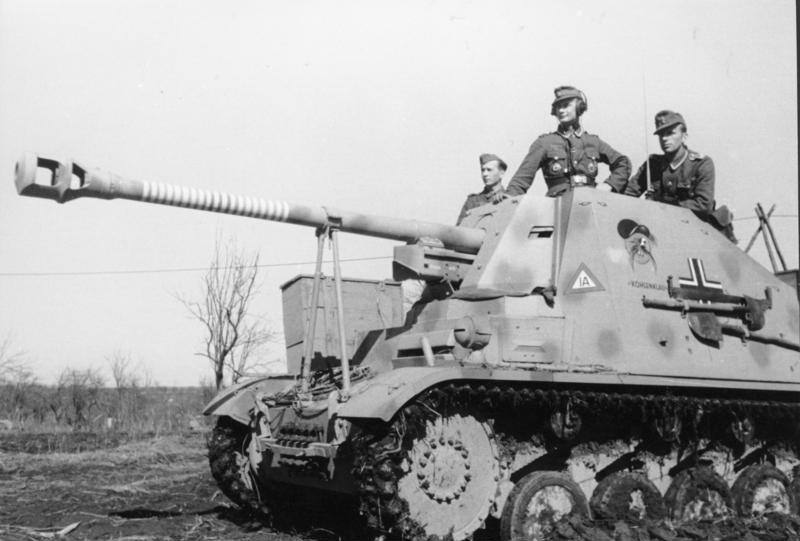
The Marder II "coal thief", recognizable by the cartoon painted on both sides, on the Eastern Front in 1943. The ring markings on the barrel of the gun indicate 19 claimed kills for the vehicle.

The various Marder IIs produced fought on all European fronts of the war, however, there was a large concentration of these on the Eastern Front. The Marder IIs were used by the Panzerjäger Abteilungen of the Panzer divisions of both the Heer and the Waffen SS, as well as several Luftwaffe units. The Marder's weaknesses were mainly related to survivability. The combination of a high silhouette and open-top fighting compartment made them vulnerable to indirect artillery fire, aircraft strafing, and grenades. The armor was also quite thin, making them vulnerable to enemy tanks or infantry. The Marders were not assault vehicles or tank substitutes; the open-top compartment meant operations in crowded areas such as urban environments or other close-combat situations were not an option. They were best employed in defensive or overwatch roles. Despite their weaknesses, they were more effective than the towed antitank guns that they replaced.

== See also ==
=== Comparable vehicles ===
- German Marder I
- German Marder III
- German Panzerjäger I
- Japanese Ho-Ni I
- Soviet SU-76
- Romanian TACAM R-2 and TACAM T-60
