= TACAM R-2 =

Romanian tank destroyer

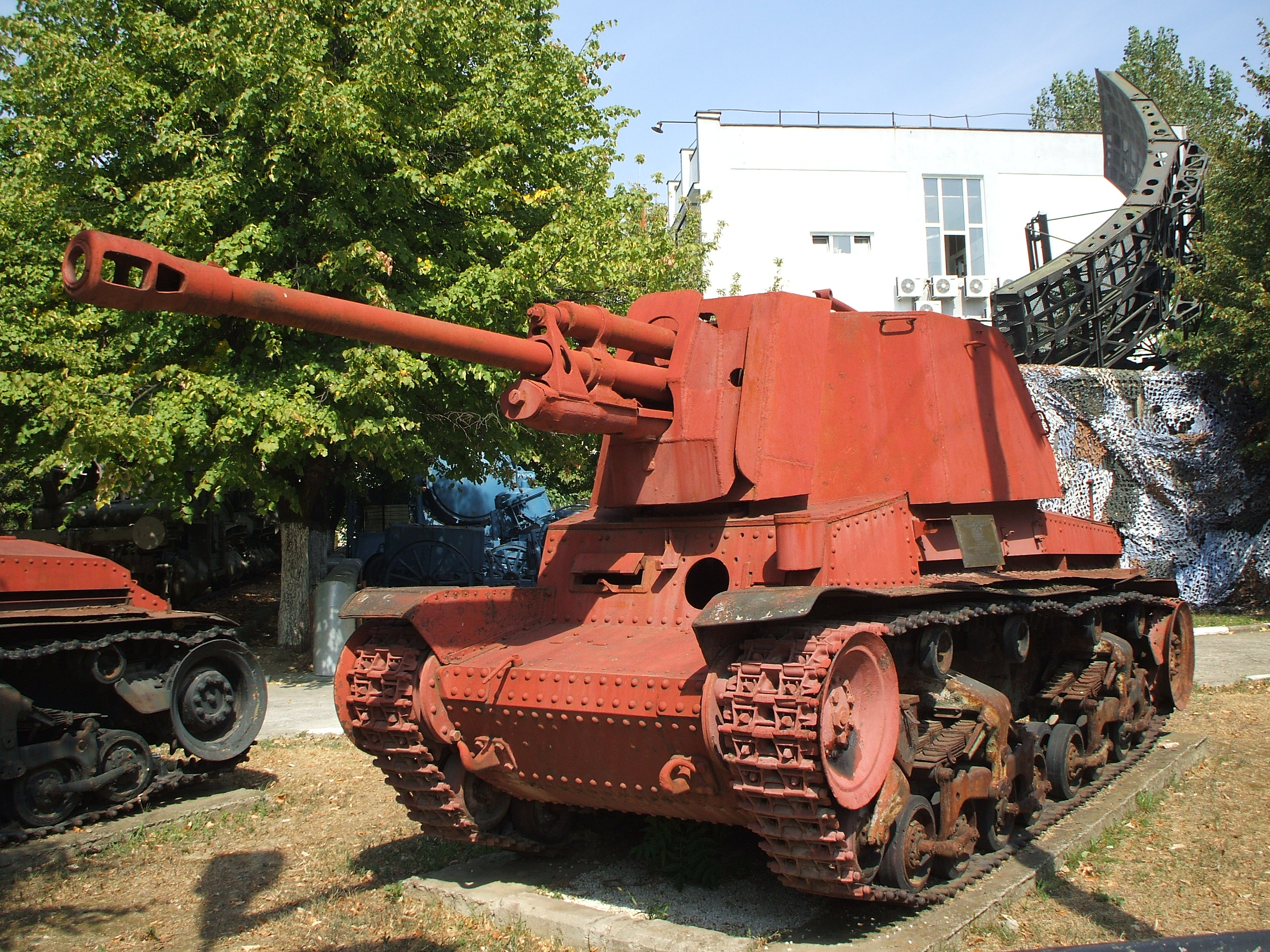
- A TACAM R-2 on display at the National Military Museum, Bucharest
- Type: Tank Destroyer
- Place of origin: Kingdom of Romania

Service history
- In service: 1944—45
- Used by: Kingdom of Romania
- Wars: World War II

Production history
- Designer: Leonida
- Designed: 1943
- Manufacturer: Leonida
- Produced: 1944
- No. built: 20 + 1 prototype

Specifications
- Mass: 12 tonnes (12 long tons; 13 short tons)
- Length: 5 metres (16 ft)
- Width: 2.064 metres (6.77 ft)
- Height: 2.32 metres (7.6 ft)
- Crew: 3
- Armor: 10–25 millimetres (0.39–0.98 in)
- Main armament: 1 x 76.2 mm Soviet ZIS-3 gun
- Secondary armament: 1 x 7.92 mm ZB-53 machine gun
- Engine: 4-cylinder, water-cooled Škoda T11/0 gasoline 125 horsepower (93 kW)
- Transmission: 6 x 6
- Suspension: leaf spring
- Ground clearance: 35 centimetres (14 in)
- Fuel capacity: 153 litres (40 US gal)
- Operational range: 130–160 kilometres (81–99 mi)
- Maximum speed: 25–30 kilometres per hour (16–19 mph) (road)

The TACAM R-2 (Tun Anticar pe Afet Mobil R-2 – "Anti-tank gun on R-2 mobile gun carriage") was a Romanian tank destroyer used during World War II. It was built by removing the turret of the R-2 light tank (a slightly modified Panzer 35(t)) and building a pedestal to mount a Soviet 76.2 mm (3.00 in) ZiS-3 field gun in its place. A three-sided fighting compartment was built to protect the gun and its crew. Twenty were built in 1944, but only one is known to exist today. It participated in the Budapest Offensive and the Prague Offensive.

== Development ==
By December 1942 it was blatantly obvious that Romania's R-2 light tanks (Panzer 35(t)) were no longer capable of standing up to Soviet medium tanks, but something had to be done to extend their service. It was decided to convert them to tank destroyers on the model of the German Marder II and Romania's own TACAM T-60, still in development. The turret was removed from one R-2 to serve as the prototype over the summer of 1943 to test the concept. A captured Soviet 76.2 millimetres (3.00 in) M-1936 F-22 field gun was removed from its carriage and a new mount was fabricated to fit the gun to the turretless R-2. A fighting compartment was built using armor salvaged from captured Soviet tanks. New Romanian and German gun sights were fitted to suit the new Romanian ammunition. Testing in late 1943 proved that the gun didn't overpower the chassis, but the gun was only effective against T-34s up to ranges of 500–600 metres (550–660 yd). Forty were planned to be converted by Leonida in Bucharest, but the process couldn't begin immediately because Germany hadn't yet delivered the tanks that were to replace the R-2 which allowed the F-22 gun to be exchanged for the more powerful ZiS-3 gun on the production models.

=== Uprated armament proposals ===
==== Anti-tank guns ====
Proposals were made to rearm them to better counter the new heavily armored Soviet Iosif Stalin tanks. Guns proposed included the Romanian-built 75 mm (3.0 in) Reşiţa Model 1943 anti-tank gun or the German 88 mm (3.5 in) gun, but nothing was done before Romanian pro-Axis leader Ion Antonescu was overthrown in August 1944, making the country defect to the Allied powers.

Another similar proposal suggested installing a Romanian-produced 88 mm anti-tank gun, based on the Romanian license-produced 75 mm Vickers Model 1931, on the R-2 chassis. A June 1944 report compares this Romanian gun to a German 88 mm Flak gun; the Romanian gun performed better in terms of rounds per minute (25 compared to 20 of the German gun), combat weight (4,5 t compared to 7,5 t of the German gun) and traveling weight (4,5 t compared to 5 t of the German gun). In other aspects, the two guns were similar. In the short time remaining before Romania was overrun by the Red Army, at least four such 88 mm guns are known to have been produced. The same June 1944 report stated that a model adapted for mounting on the R-2 chassis was urgently needed, and estimated that it could be built in 3 to 4 weeks. Currently, it is unknown whether this proposal was materialized.

==== Flamethrower ====
Besides the proposed more capable anti-tank guns, Mark Axworthy also mentions a proposal to convert the remaining chassis into flamethrower vehicles to better counter new Soviet heavy tanks. No such vehicle is known to have been constructed, but the Romanians built a different flamethrower vehicle around spring 1943, in the early development phase of the Mareșal tank destroyer.

== Description ==
The TACAM R-2 had a 76.2 millimetres (3.00 in) ZiS-3 gun mounted on an R-2 light tank (Panzer 35(t)) chassis from which the turret had been removed. The gun was protected by a three-sided, fixed, partially roofed gun shield with sides 10–17 millimetres (0.39–0.67 in) thick. The armour plate for the gun shield was salvaged from captured Soviet BT-7 and T-26 tanks. The gun could traverse 30°, elevate 15° and depress 5°. A total of thirty rounds were carried for the main gun, twenty-one HE and nine AP. The chassis was little changed from that of the R-2 and retained its hull-mounted 7.92 millimetres (0.312 in) ZB-53 machine gun. The armour of the hull ranged from 8 to 25 millimetres (0.31 to 0.98 in) thick. It could cross a ditch 2 metres (6.6 ft) wide, climb an obstacle .5 metres (1.6 ft) high and ford a stream .8 metres (2.6 ft) deep.

== Operational history ==
Leonida began work in late February 1944, and the first batch of twenty conversions was complete by the end of June. Production was halted then because the gun was thought inadequate to face the new heavily armored IS-2 tanks being fielded by the Soviets. Ten vehicles were organized into the 63rd TACAM Company in July 1944 and assigned to the 1st Armored Training Division. The rest of 10 vehicles were assigned to a Cavalry division. After 23 August coup, a company of twelve was assigned to the Niculescu Detachment when it was rushed north at the beginning of September to defend the Transylvanian frontier against the Axis counterattack from Hungary. Four more were added when the Niculescu Detachment was absorbed into the ad hoc Armoured Group on 29 September in preparation for attacks intended to clear Northern Transylvania. This was successful and the Armoured Group was disbanded when the joint Soviet-Romanian forces pushed the last Axis units out of Romanian territory on 25 October 1944.

Twelve were assigned to the 2nd Armoured Regiment when it was sent to the front Czechoslovakia in February 1945. The Soviets immediately seized most of the TACAM R-2s in exchange for a few captured German tanks, but two were reported as operational on 31 March and two were still on hand on 24 April. One of these was destroyed before 30 April and the other was damaged mopping up German units near Brno in May. None were reported with the remnants of the regiment when it returned to Bucharest on 14 May 1945.

One survives today in the Romanian National Military Museum in Bucharest.

== Photo gallery ==
The gallery shows the TACAM R-2 at the Bucharest Military Museum. Red paintjob photos are from 2006, light teal ones from 2019.

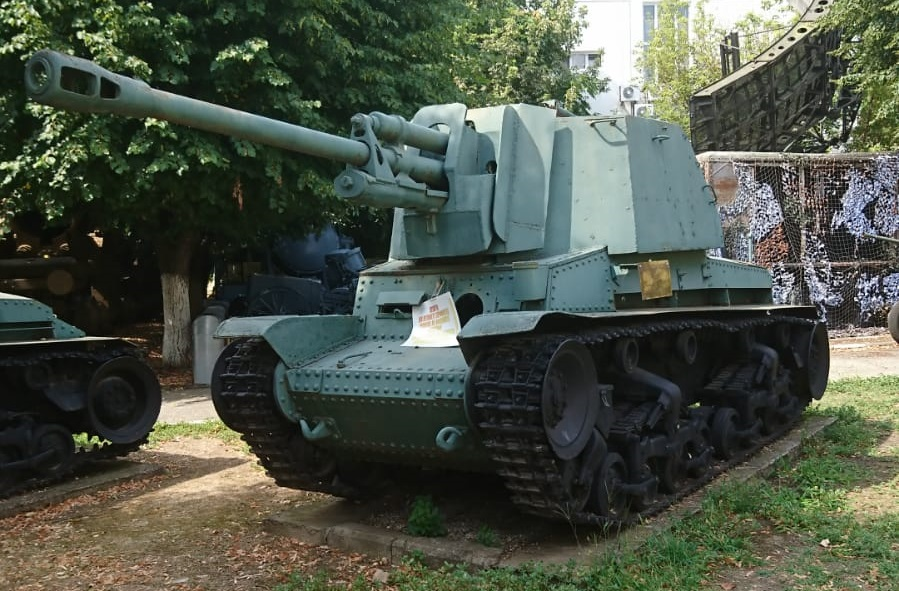

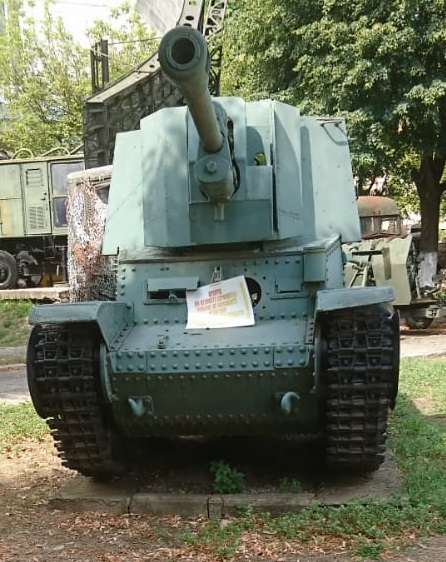

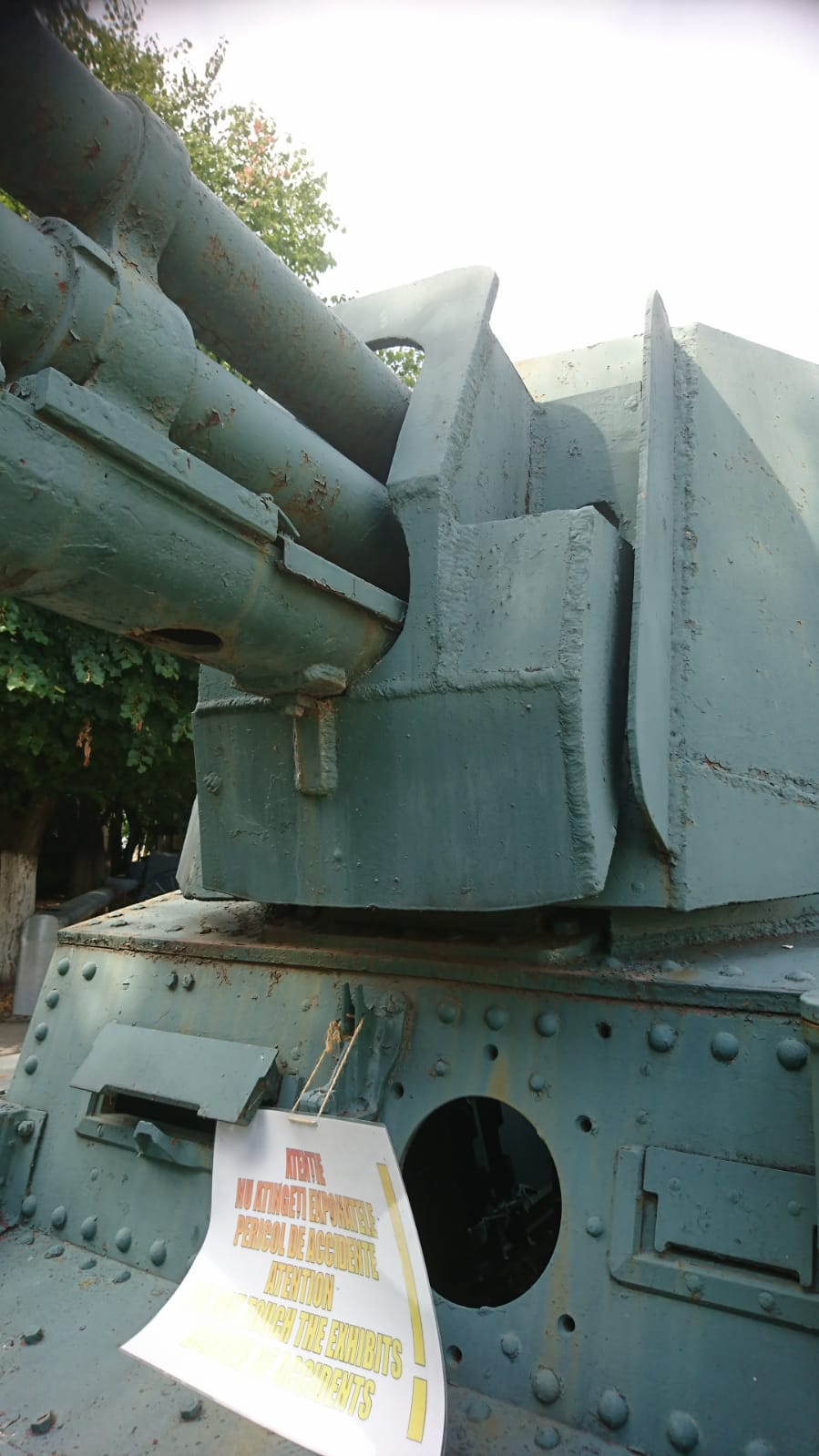

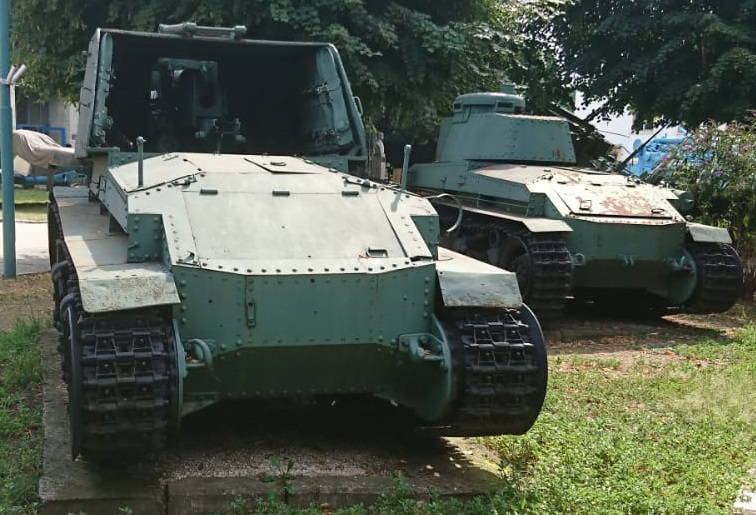

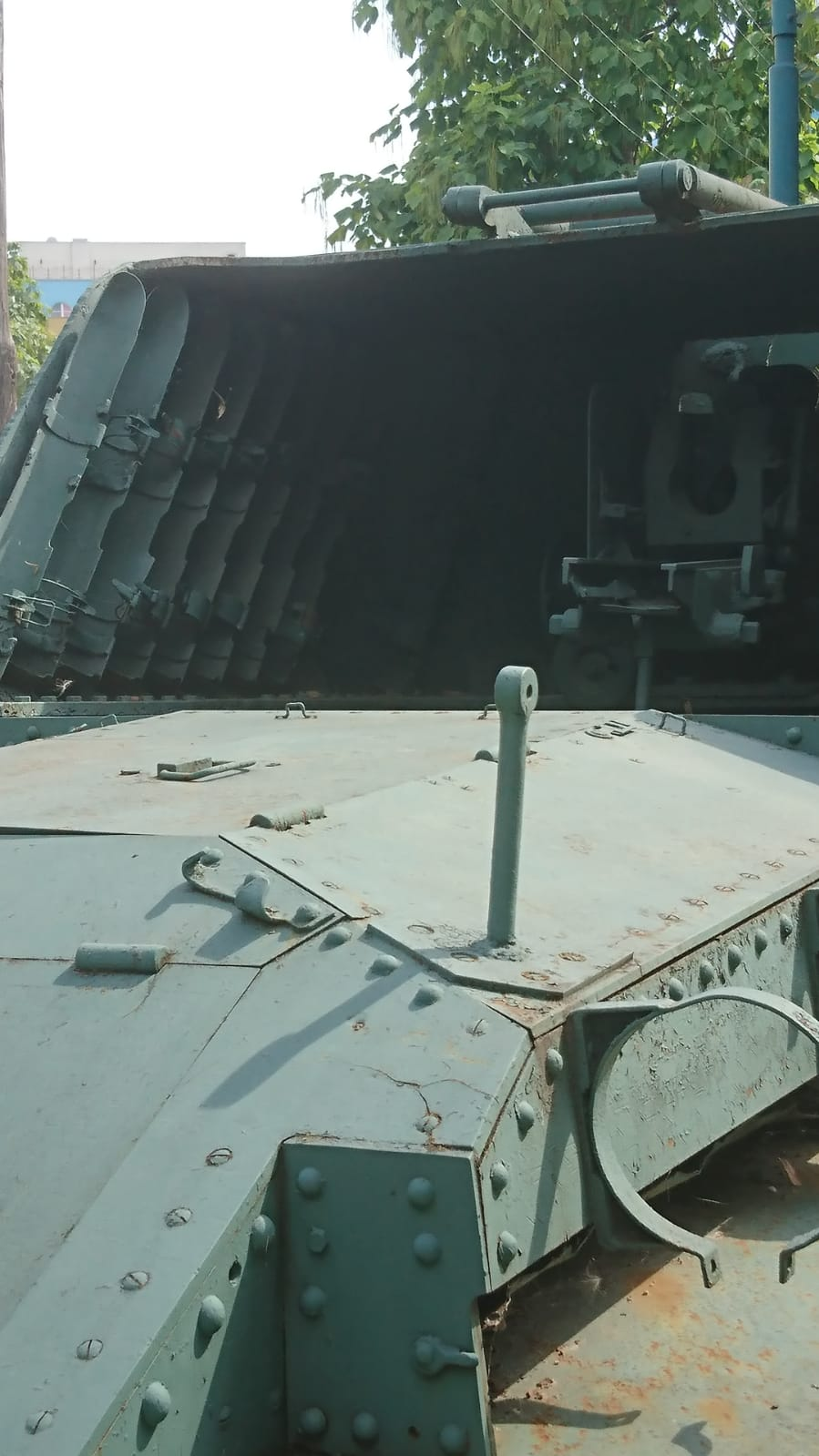

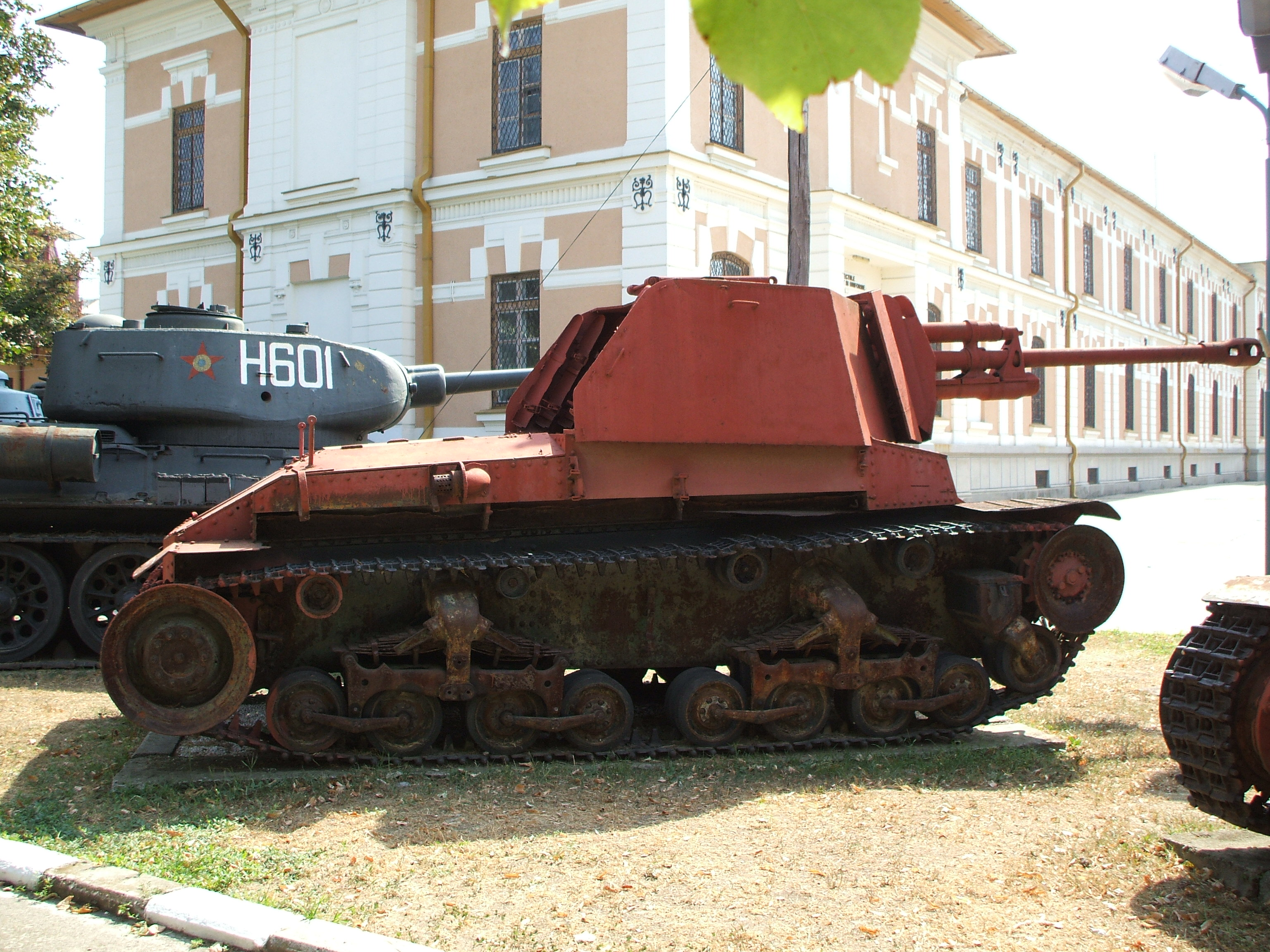
