= 6-pounder gun =

6-pounder gun or 6-pdr, usually denotes a 57-millimetre (2.2 in) gun firing a projectile weighing approximately 6 pounds (2.7 kg). Before the mid-19th century, a 6-pounder gun referred to a cannon having a bore of about 3.67 in (93 mm) and firing a round shot weighing 6 lb (2.7 kg).

Guns of this type include:

- QF 6 pounder Hotchkiss, a 57 mm naval gun of the 1880s; a similar weapon was designed by Driggs-Schroeder for the US Navy
- Driggs-Schroeder Marks II and III and Driggs-Seabury M1898 and M1900 57 mm guns on mobile mounts, used by the US Army circa 1890–1920
- QF 6 pounder 6 cwt Hotchkiss, a British 57 mm tank gun of 1917
- QF 6 pounder Nordenfelt, a 57 mm naval gun of the 1880s very similar to the Hotchkiss
- Ordnance QF 6-pounder, a British 57 mm anti-tank and tank gun of World War II
- QF 6 pounder 10 cwt gun, a British twin mount naval and coast defence gun 1937–1956.

Older types include:

- 6-pounder smoothbore cannon, a muzzle-loading cannon of the 1700–1860 period employed by several nations
- Canon de 6 système An XI, a French 6-pounder muzzle-loading cannon of the Napoleonic era
- M1841 6-pounder field gun, an American 6-pounder smoothbore muzzle-loading cannon of the mid-1800s

== Guns denoted by calibre ==
Examples simply referred to by caliber include:

- Bofors 57 mm gun family, including a World War II field antitank gun, a World War II 57 mm × 230 mm aircraft autocannon, and a still-current family of three 57 mm x 438 mm naval artillery gun/anti air autocannons
- 57 55 J, Finnish light coastal gun
- 57 mm anti-tank gun M1943 (ZiS-2), Soviet 57×480 mmR AT gun, also used on the ZiS-30
- Ho-401 cannon, Japanese prototype aircraft autocannon
- Type 90 57 mm tank gun, Japanese tank cannon
- Type 97 57 mm tank gun, Japanese tank cannon
- Ch-51(M), used on the Soviet assault gun ASU-57
- AZP S-60, Soviet 57×347mm SR AA autocannon, also integrated into ZSU-57-2

Older types include:

- 5.7 cm Maxim-Nordenfelt, short fortress gun of the 1880s

== See also ==
- Naval artillery in the Age of Sail
