= Zavod imeni Stalina =

ZiS (Russian: Zavod imeni Stalina, 'Factory named for Stalin') may refer to:

- Zavod imeni Likhacheva of Moscow, formerly Automotive Factory No. 2 Zavod imeni Stalina, and its products:
  - ZIS-101 limousine
  - ZIS-110 limousine
  - ZIS-150
  - ZIS-151 General-purpose truck
  - ZIS-152 (BTR-152) armoured personnel carrier
  - ZIS-154 - transit bus
  - ZIS-155 - transit bus
- Artillery Factory No. 92, Zavod imeni Stalina of Gorky, and its products:
  - ZiS-2 57mm antitank gun
  - ZiS-3 76.2mm divisional gun
  - ZiS-5 76.2mm tank gun (version of the F-34 tank gun)
  - ZiS-30 self-propelled antitank gun
  - ZiS-S-53 85mm tank gun
