= 76 mm divisional gun M1939 (USV) =

76-mm divisional gun model 1939 (USV)
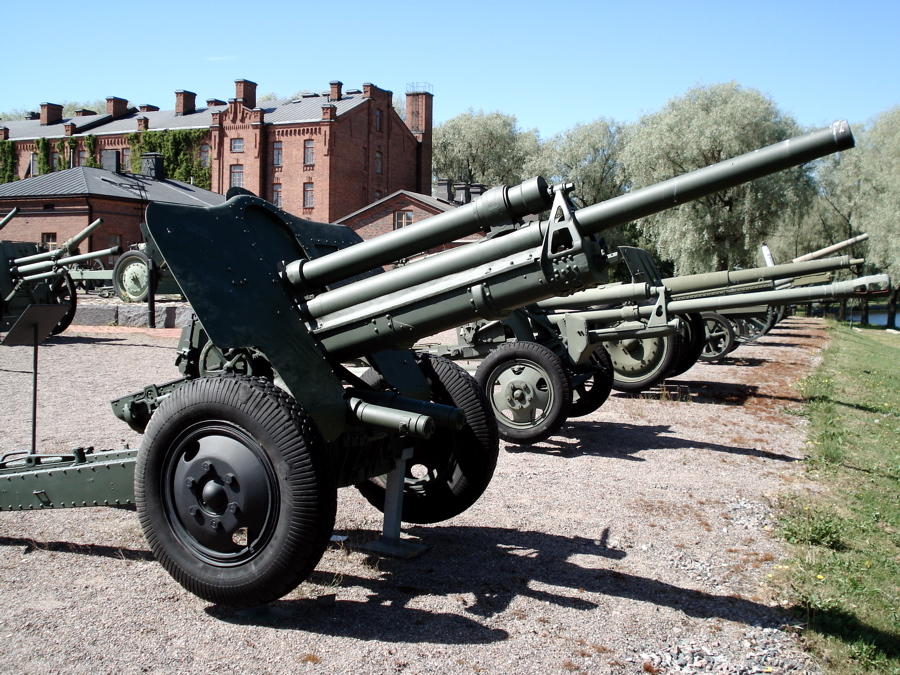
- USV in Hämeenlinna Artillery Museum, Finland.
- Type: Field gun
- Place of origin: Soviet Union

Production history
- Designer: Design bureau of No. 92 Plant, headed by V. G. Grabin
- Produced: 1939–1941
- No. built: 9,812

Specifications
- Mass: combat:1,470 kg (3,240 lb) travel:2,500 kg (5,500 lb)
- Length: 5.95 m (19 ft 6 in)
- Barrel length: 3.2 m (10 ft 6 in) L/42
- Width: 1.94 m (6 ft 4 in)
- Height: 1.7 m (5 ft 7 in)
- Crew: 5
- Shell: 76.2×385 mmR
- Caliber: 76.2 mm (3 in)
- Carriage: split trail
- Elevation: −6° / 45°
- Traverse: 60°
- Rate of fire: 15 rounds per minute
- Maximum firing range: 13.29 km (8.26 mi)

The 76-mm divisional gun M1939 (F-22 USV or USV) (Russian: 76-мм дивизионная пушка обр. 1939 г. (Ф-22 УСВ or УСВ)) was a 76.2 mm cannon produced in the Soviet Union. It was adopted for Red Army service in 1939 and used extensively in World War II. The gun was designated as "divisional" – issued to batteries under the direct control of division headquarters. The F-22 USV was an intermediate model, coming between the F-22, which had limited anti-aircraft capability, and the simpler and cheaper ZiS-3, which eventually replaced it in production and service.

== Description ==
The USV had a split-trail carriage with suspension; metal wheels with rubber tires were borrowed from the ZiS-5 truck. The gun featured semi-automatic vertical sliding breech block and Bofors-type cradle; recoil mechanism consisted of hydraulic recoil buffer and hydro-pneumatic recuperator. Sights and elevation controls were located on different sides of the barrel. The chamber fitted the standard model 1900 cartridge, which meant that the gun could use ammunition manufactured for older 76.2 mm divisional and regimental guns.

== Development history ==
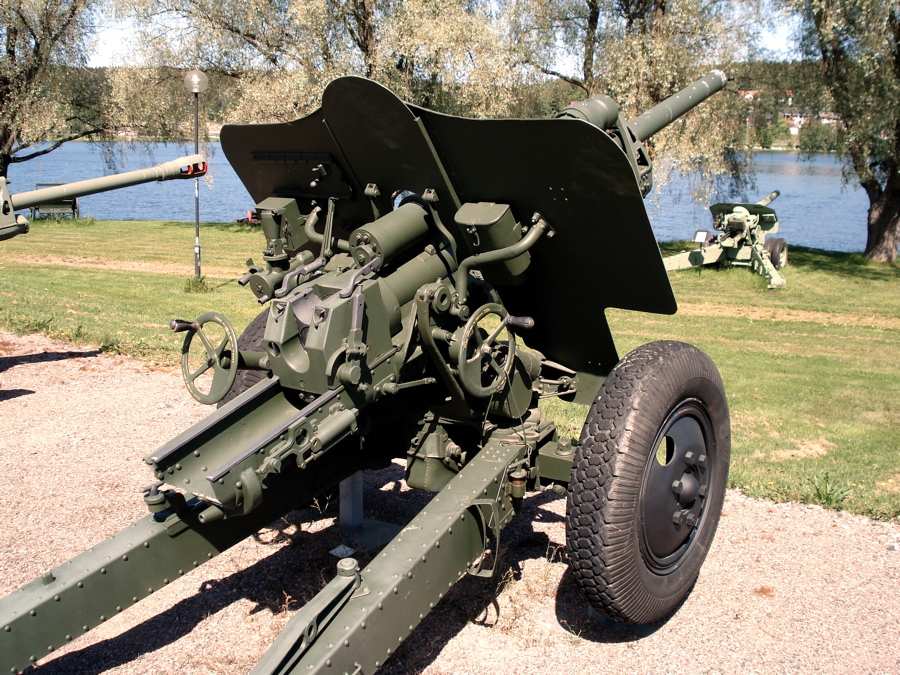
USV in Hämeenlinna Artillery museum, Finland.

In 1937, unsatisfied with both the obsolete 76-mm divisional gun M1902/30 and the new, but flawed 76 mm divisional gun model 1936 (F-22), Red Army command (RKKA) initiated development of a new gun. The requirements, issued in March that year, specified elevation of 45° and combat weight of no more than 1,500 kg. The gun was supposed to have the same ballistics as the M1902/30 and use the same ammunition.

Three design bureaus joined the program – Kirovskiy Plant bureau under I. A. Makhanov, No. 92 Plant bureau under V. G. Grabin, and AKB-43 (KB AU) under M. N. Kondakov. The L-12 of Kirovskiy Plant was the first to reach ground tests (in April–May 1938), was returned for revision, tested again in August and given to the RKKA for further trials. Grabin's gun went through ground tests in March–April 1939 and was also given to the army. Although its designation – F-22 USV or simply USV – suggested that the gun was only an upgrade of the F-22, in fact it was a completely new design. The third competing project, OKB-43's NDP, failed ground tests in April 1939. RKKA tested the remaining designs from 5 June to 3 July 1939 and was generally satisfied with both of them. The USV was found to have less "childhood diseases" and was therefore recommended for production.

The USV entered production in 1939; 140 pieces were built until the end of the year and 1,010 more in 1940. In 1941, production was stopped as the plan for divisional guns was already fulfilled. Moreover, RKKA considered transition to larger caliber divisional guns, such as the 107 mm gun model 1940 (M-60). With the German invasion in 1941, production was reopened at No. 92 and the Barrikady factory in Stalingrad; it amounted to 2,616 pieces in 1941 and 6,046 in 1942. From late summer of 1941 the gun was being gradually replaced in production by yet another of Grabin's design – ZiS-3 – and by the end of 1942 the process was completed.

== Organization and service ==
=== RKKA ===
According to the organization of 1939, each rifle division had two artillery regiments: a light regiment with a battalion of 76 mm guns in three batteries of four guns, and two mixed battalions with one battery of 76 mm guns and two batteries of 122 mm howitzers, and a howitzer regiment of 20 75 mm guns. In June 1940 a battalion of 76-mm guns was removed, only 8 guns remained. In March 1942 a third mixed battalion (a battery of 76 mm and a battery of 122 mm) was added, which brought the number of 76 mm guns to 12.

Guards rifle divisions from December 1942 had three artillery battalions (two batteries of 76 mm guns and one battery of 122 mm howitzers each), totaling 24 76-mm guns. From December 1944 they were reorganized to have an artillery brigade of three regiments, including a light regiment with 20 76 mm guns. From June 1945, all rifle divisions were reorganized identically.

Motorized divisions had two mixed battalions (one battery of 76 mm guns, two batteries of 122 mm howitzers), totaling 8 76-mm guns. Cavalry divisions until August 1941 also had 8 76-mm guns, then their divisional artillery was removed and in summer of 1942 restored again.

Rifle brigades from 1939 had 8 76 mm divisional guns; motorized and mechanized brigades had 12.

Cavalry corps from late 1942 had artillery battalion of 12 pieces. Tank and artillery corps in late 1944 received light artillery regiment with 76 mm guns (24 pieces).

The USV was also used by artillery units of the Reserve of the Main Command, namely: anti-tank artillery brigades (24 pieces, from 1942 – tank destroyer brigades with 16 pieces), by light artillery brigades (60–72 pieces) and by breakthrough artillery divisions (light brigade with 72 pieces, from 1944 – with 48 pieces).

By 1 June 1941, the Red Army possessed 1,070 USVs. Many were lost in combat, but some remained in service until the end of the German-Soviet War. It's not clear whether the gun saw combat in the earlier Winter War.

=== Other operators ===
7.62 cm Pak 39(r). Note the muzzle brake.

In 1941–42 the Wehrmacht captured hundreds of USVs and adopted them as field guns, designated 7.62 cm FK 297(r). Some USVs in German service were converted to anti-tank guns, designated 7.62 cm Pak 39(r) (By March 1944, 359 pieces were in service, including 295 in the West, 40 in Denmark and 24 in the East).

The Finns captured nine of these guns. They were designated 76 K 39, war journals from 12.01.1940 show that some of the guns were given to the 6th battery in Lapland after the failure of the notorious Bofors 105mm mountain guns due to the extreme cold.

The Romanian Army captured a number of these guns during Operation Barbarossa. They were later put into service with the artillery units of infantry divisions to replace the losses of 75 mm field guns. Two F-22USV are preserved in front of the Military Museum in Oradea.

== Variants ==
- USV – pre-war variant.
- ZiS-22-USV – war-time variant. Breech parts identical with F-34 tank gun were used. There were changes in barrel construction and suspension, new ZiS-13 sights, more cast details. in production from 15 July 1941.
- USV-BR – variant produced by "Barrikady" plant. Differed in barrel construction and suspension.

== Summary ==
The USV was an improvement over its predecessor, the F-22. However it was still too big and heavy and had the same inconvenient placement of sights and elevation controls on different sides of the barrel, making the gun less effective in an anti-tank role. Those shortcomings led to its replacement by the lighter and easier to produce ZiS-3.

== Ammunition ==
Available ammunition
Type	Model	Weight, kg	HE weight, g	Muzzle velocity, m/s	Range, m
Armor-piercing shells
APHE-T	BR-350A	6,3	155	662	4,000
APHE-T	BR-350B	6,5	119	655	4,000
AP-T	BR-350BSP	6,5	–	655	4,000
Subcaliber (from April 1943)	BR-354P	3,02	–	950	500
HEAT, steely iron (from May 1943)	BP-350A	5,28	623	355	500
High explosive and fragmentation shells
HE-Fragmentation, steel	OF-350	6,2	710	680	13,290
Fragmentation, steely iron	O-350A	6,21	540	680	10,000
HE-Fragmentation	OF-350V	6,2
HE-Fragmentation, limited production	OF-363	7,1
HE, steel, old Russian	F-354	6,41	785	640	9,170
HE, steel, old Russian	F-354M	6,1	815
HE, steel, old French	F-354F	6,41	785	640	9,170
Shrapnel shells
Shrapnel with 22 sec / D tube	Sh-354	6,5	85 (260 bullets)	624	6,000
Shrapnel with T-6 tube	Sh-354T	6,66	85 (250 bullets)	618	8,600
Shrapnel	Sh-354G	66,58	85
Shrapnel	Sh-361	6,61	–	666	8,400
Canister shots
Canister shot	Sh-350		549 bullets		200
Smoke shells
Smoke, steel	D-350	6,45	80 TNT + 505 yellow phosphorus
Smoke, steely iron	D-350A	6,45	66 TNT + 380 yellow phosphorus
Incendiary shells
Incendiary, steel	Z-350	6,24	240	679	9,400
Incendiary	Z-354 (project 3890)	6,5 (6,66)	240	624	6,200
Incendiary	Z-354	4,65	240	680	5,600
Other shells
Fragmentation-chemical	OH-350	6,25		680	13,000

Armour penetration table
AP Projectile BR-350A
Distance, m	Meet angle 60°, mm	Meet angle 90°, mm
100	65	80
300	60	75
500	55	70
1000	50	60
1500	45	50
Subcaliber projectile BR-354P
Distance, m	Meet angle 60°, mm	Meet angle 90°, mm
100	95	120
300	85	105
500	75	90
These data was obtained by Soviet methodics of armour penetration measurement (penetration probability equals 75%). They are not directly comparable with western data of similar type

== References and external links ==
- Shirokorad A. B. – Encyclopedia of the Soviet Artillery – Mn. Harvest, 2000 (А.Б.Широкорад. Энциклопедия отечественной артиллерии. – Мн.: Харвест, 2000., ISBN 985-433-703-0)
- Shirokorad A. B. – The genius of the Soviet Artillery: The triumph and the tragedy of V. Grabin, M. AST, 2002 (А.Б.Широкорад. Гений советской артиллерии: триумф и трагедия В.Грабина. – М.,ООО Издательство АСТ, 2002., ISBN 5-17-013066-X)
- Shirokorad A. B. – The God of War of the Third Reich – M. AST, 2002 (Широкорад А. Б. Бог войны Третьего рейха. — М.,ООО Издательство АСТ, 2002., ISBN 5-17-015302-3)
- Shunkov V. N. – The Weapons of the Red Army – Mn. Harvest, 1999 (Шунков В. Н. – Оружие Красной Армии. — Мн.: Харвест, 1999., ISBN 985-433-469-4)
- Ivanov A. – Artillery of the USSR in Second World War – SPb Neva, 2003 (Иванов А. Артиллерия СССР во Второй Мировой войне. — СПб., Издательский дом «Нева», 2003., ISBN 5-7654-2731-6)
- Artillery – M. Voenizdat MoD USSR, 1953 (Артиллерия \ под общ. ред. маршала артиллерии Чистякова М. Н. – М.:Воениздат МО СССР, 1953.)
- Yefimov M.G. – A Course of Artillery Shells – M.-L. Oborongiz PCoD USSR, 1939 (Ефимов М. Г. Курс артиллерийских снарядов. – М.-Л.: Оборонгиз НКО СССР, 1939)
- Kozlovskiy D.E. – Artillery Equipment – M. Oborongiz PCoD USSR, 1939 (Козловский Д. Е. Материальная часть артиллерии. – М.: Оборонгиз НКО СССР, 1939)
- Collection of the Artillery Museum Materials, No. IV – P.-L. AIM, 1959 (Сборник исследований и материалов Артиллерийского исторического музея. Выпуск IV. \ под ред. полк. Ермошина И. П.-Л.: АИМ, 1959)
- Nikolaev A. B. – Battalion Artillery – M. Oborongiz PCoD USSR, 1937 (Николаев А. Б. Батальонная артиллерия. – М..: Оборонгиз НКО СССР, 1937)
- 76-mm gun model 1942 Service Manual (Руководство службы 76-мм пушки обр. 1942 г.)
