= 76 mm divisional gun M1902/30 =

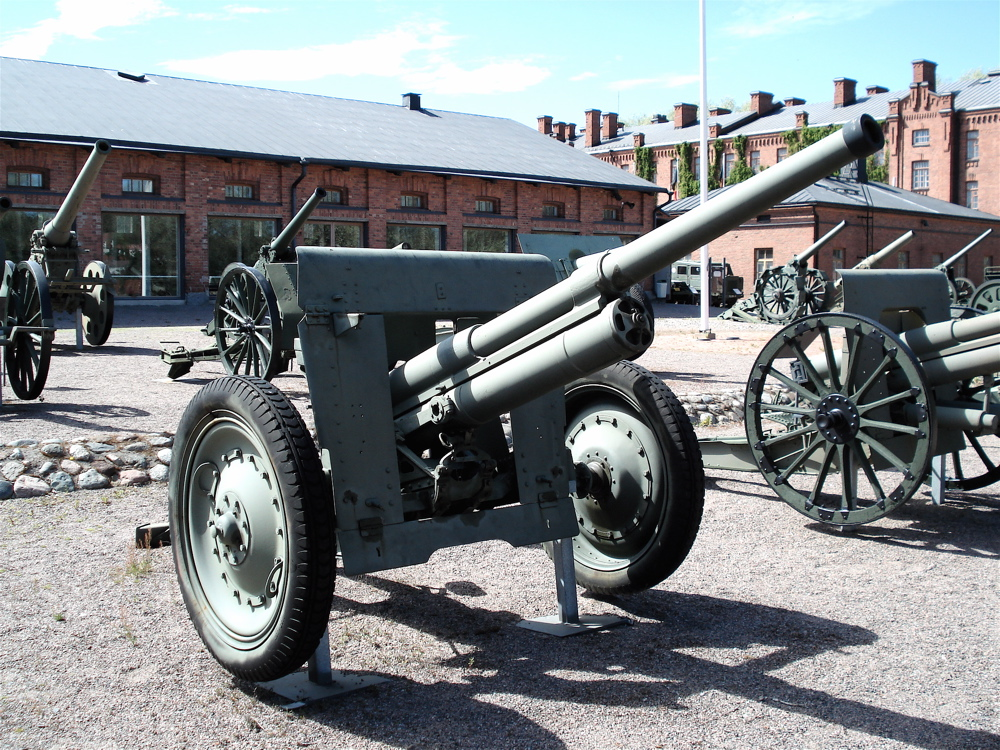
- 76 mm divisional gun M1902/30 in the Artillery Museum of Finland, Hämeenlinna.
- Type: Field gun
- Place of origin: Soviet Union

Production history
- Designer: Perm Plant, E. N. Sidorenko
- Produced: 1931–1937

Specifications
- Mass: combat: 1,350 kg (2,976 lbs) travel: 2,380 kg (5,247 lbs)
- Barrel length: 40 calibers
- Shell: Fixed QF 76.2 x 385mm R
- Shell weight: 7.5 kg (17 lb)
- Caliber: 76.2 mm (3 in)
- Carriage: Pole-trail
- Elevation: -3° to 37°
- Traverse: 5°
- Rate of fire: 10–12 rounds per minute
- Muzzle velocity: 662 m/s (2,172 ft/s)
- Maximum firing range: 13.29 km (8.25 mi)

76 mm divisional gun M1902/30 (Russian: 76-мм дивизионная пушка обр. 1902/30 гг.) was a Soviet modernized version of the Russian World War I 76 mm divisional gun M1902, employed in the early stages of Operation Barbarossa.

== Development history ==
The M1902 gun was the mainstay of Russian Empire artillery; as such it was extensively used in World War I and the Russian Civil War and remained in service in former parts of the Russian Empire (Soviet Union, Poland, Finland). It was also adopted by some other countries (Romania, Turkey). By 1928, the M1902 formed the bulk of the Red Army's 2,500 artillery pieces.

The M1902 had some reserves for enhancing its firepower. In 1927–1930 more than 20 modernized pieces were tried out. In the end it was decided to adopt the gun and was developed at the Perm Plant, by a team headed by E. N. Sidorenko. The result of this modernization was a semi-new gun with drastically improved performance.

This modernization included lengthening the barrel from 30 to 40 calibers, making a hole in the single trail carriage to allow a larger elevation angle, installing a balancing mechanism and adding a new panoramic sight. As a result of such enhancements the muzzle velocity reached 662 m/s, the elevation angle was increased from 17 to 37 degrees and the maximal range was increased from 8,500 to 13,290 m. From 1931 only new L40 barrels were produced. In the mid-1930s a new 6.3 kg armour-piercing round was introduced, giving the M1930 gun the ability to penetrate 56 mm armour at 500 m under 30 degrees meet angle from normal direction and 49 mm armour at a distance of 1,000 m under the same conditions. Direct fire distance was 820 m at 2 m target height. The modernized M1930 gun could easily dispatch any tank of the 1930s, including the new French vehicles Somua S35 and B1 bis.

However the modernization did not address the low mobility and small traverse angle of the gun due to its remaining single trail carriage without suspension. Maximal, horse-drawn, transport speed was only 6–7 km/h. This limited the anti-tank effectiveness of the M1902/30 and essentially rendered the gun obsolete in swift and maneuver warfare, so it was phased out of production in 1937 when the new divisional gun, the F-22, was adopted.

== Service ==
By 1 June 1941 the RKKA possessed 2,066 M1902 and 2,411 M1902/30 guns. In the beginning of the German-Soviet War these guns were gradually replaced by more advanced F-22, F-22USV and ZiS-3 76 mm divisional guns. Guns withdrawn from front-line service were transferred to the artillery regiments of riflemen divisions in rear military districts of the Soviet Union until they were finally replaced by ZiS-3.

== References and external links ==
- Ivanov A. – Artillery of the USSR in Second World War – SPb Neva, 2003 (Иванов А. Артиллерия СССР во Второй Мировой войне. — СПб., Издательский дом Нева, 2003., ISBN 5-7654-2731-6)
- Shunkov V. N. – The Weapons of the Red Army, Mn. Harvest, 1999 (Шунков В. Н. – Оружие Красной Армии. – Мн.: Харвест, 1999.) ISBN 985-433-469-4
