= ZIS =

ZIS may refer to:

- Alzintan Airport in Zintan, Libya (IATA airport code ZIS)
- Zavod imeni Stalina; several enterprises in the former Soviet Union and its products trademarked as "ZiS"
- Zentrum für Internationale Studien der TU Dresden, School of International Studies of the Dresden University of Technology in Germany
- Zhuhai International School in Zhuhai, China
- Zurich International School in Zurich, Switzerland
- Zingiberene synthase, an enzyme
