= 76 mm divisional gun M1936 (F-22) =

76-mm divisional gun M1936 (F-22)
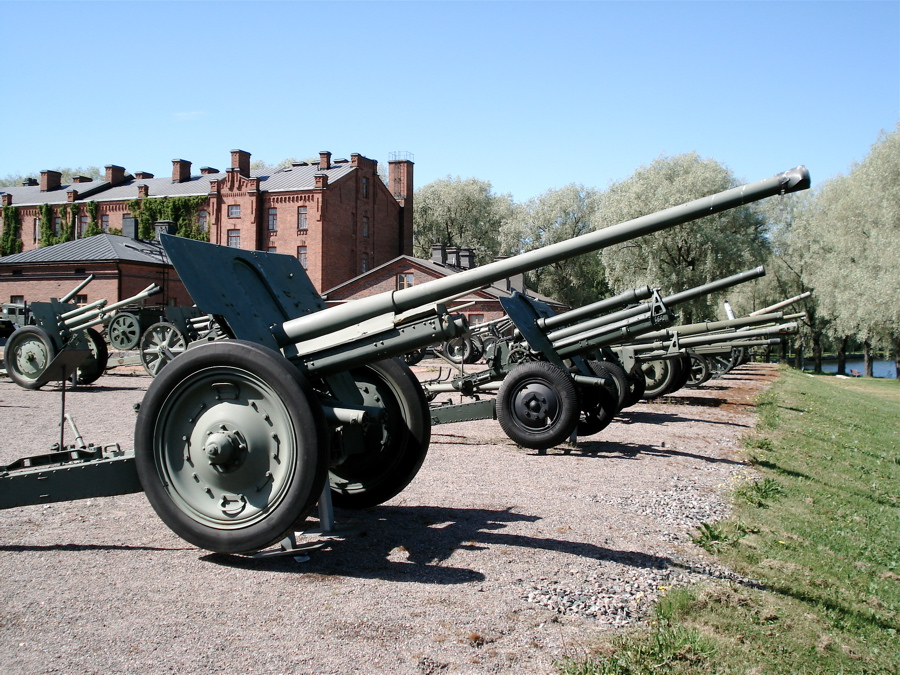
- 76-mm divisional gun F-22 in The Artillery Museum of Finland, Hämeenlinna
- Type: Field gun
- Place of origin: Soviet Union

Service history
- Used by: Soviet Union; Nazi Germany (captured)
- Wars: Soviet-Japanese border conflicts World War II

Production history
- Designer: Design bureau of No. 92 Plant, headed by V. G. Grabin
- Produced: 1937–1939
- No. built: 2,932

Specifications
- Mass: combat: 1,620 kg (3,571 lbs) travel: 2,820 kg (6,217 lbs)
- Length: 7.12 m (23 ft 4 in)
- Barrel length: bore: 3.68 m (12 ft 1 in) L/48.4 overall: 3.89 m (12 ft 9 in) L/51.2
- Width: 1.93 metres (6 ft 4 in)
- Height: 1.71 metres (5 ft 7 in)
- Crew: 6
- Shell: 76.2 × 385 mm. R
- Caliber: 76.2 mm (3 in)
- Carriage: split trail
- Elevation: -5° to 75°
- Traverse: 60°
- Rate of fire: 15 rounds per minute
- Maximum firing range: 14 km (8.69 mi)

The 76-mm divisional gun M1936 (F-22) was a Soviet divisional semi-universal gun, adopted for Red Army service in 1936. This gun was used in conflicts between the USSR and Japan on the Far East, in the Winter War and in World War II. Many F-22s were captured by the Wehrmacht during Operation Barbarossa. Modernized and redesignated as the Feldkanone 296(r), captured guns were used against their originators.

== Description ==
The F-22 was a semi-universal gun which combined the capabilities of a divisional gun and – to some extent – of an anti-aircraft gun. It had a split-trail carriage with suspension and steel wheels with rubber tires. The gun was equipped with a semi-automatic vertical sliding breech block; the recoil mechanism consisted of a hydraulic recoil buffer and a hydro-pneumatic recuperator. The sights and the elevation controls were located on different sides of the barrel. The chamber fitted the standard model 1900 cartridge, which meant that the gun could use ammunition of older 76.2-mm divisional and regimental guns.

== Development and production history ==
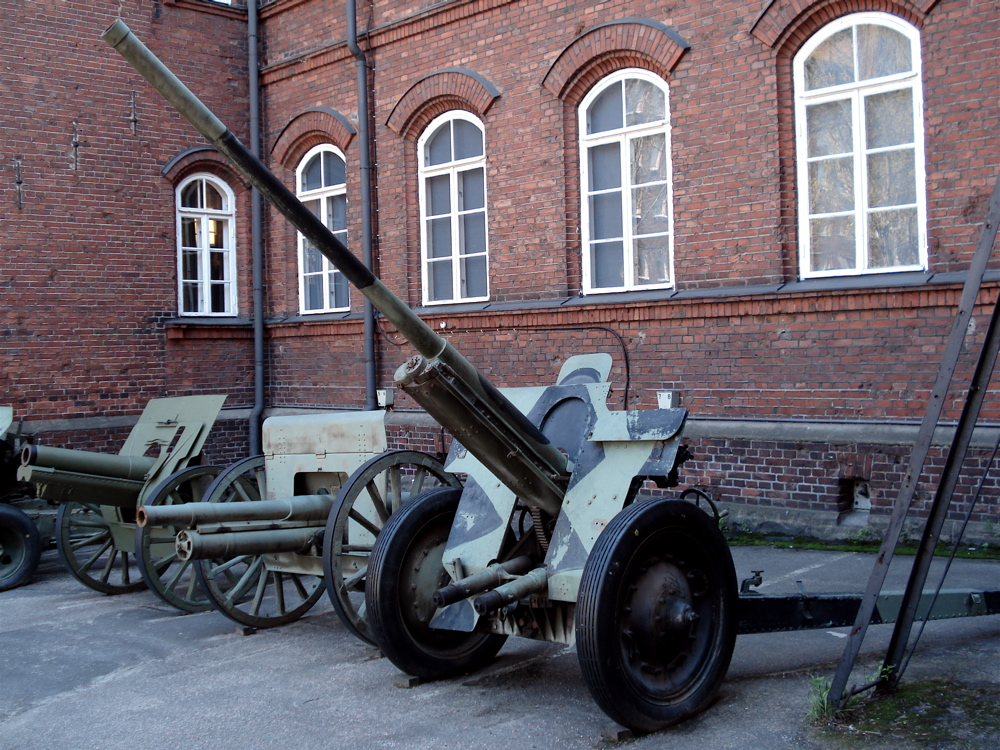
F-22 displayed outside the Finnish Military Museum in Helsinki.

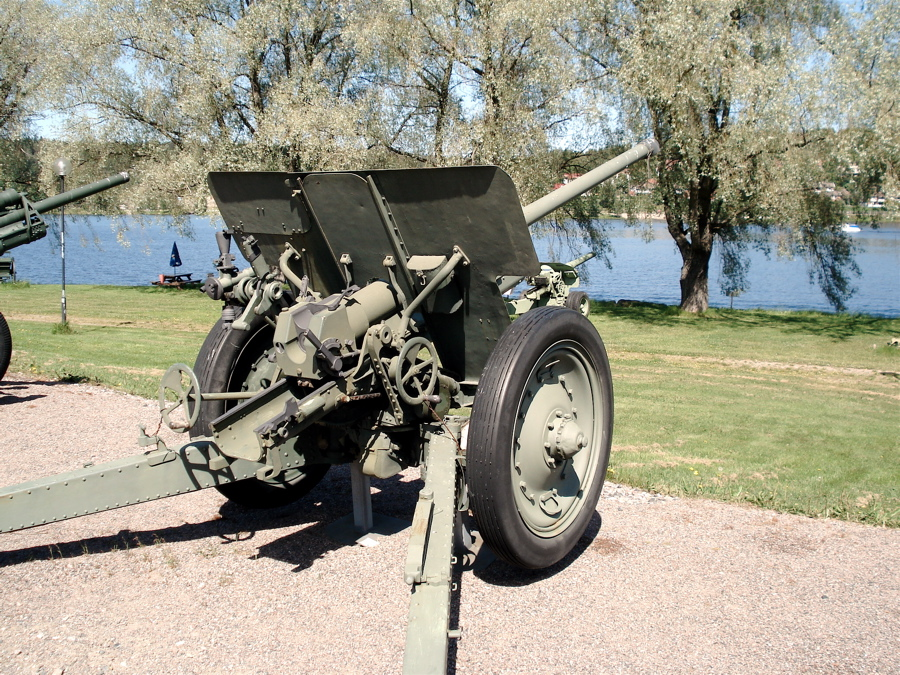
F-22 in Hämeenlinna artillery museum, Finland.

In the early 1930s the Red Army command considered the idea of universal guns – i.e. guns which could be used both as field and anti-aircraft weapons. Mikhail Tukhachevsky, the head of the ordnance department between 1931 and 1934, ordered the development of universal (with 360° traverse) and semi-universal divisional pieces.

Among other artillery design bureaus joining the program were the design bureau of the "Krasniy Putilovets" plant (L-1 and L-2 universal guns), the design bureau of the no. 8 plant (semi-universal guns 25K, 31K and 32K) and GKB-38 (universal A-52 and semi-universal A-51). GKB-38 was closed in 1933, and V. G. Grabin, the leading developer of the team that was working on the A-51 project – became the head of a design bureau of the new Novoye Sormovo (no. 92) plant in Gorky. In 1934 the A-51 – redesignated F-20 – was finished, but Grabin wasn't satisfied with the result and started to work on a new gun, the F-22.

In April 1935 three prototypes of the F-22 were ready, two of them with split-trail carriages. All prototypes had muzzle brakes and lengthened chambers for a new experimental shell (7.1 kg, muzzle velocity 710 m/s, range up to 14,060 m). Factory trials started on 8 May; on 9 June prototypes were brought to the Sofrinsky firing ground near Moscow. On 14 June the gun, along with other artillery pieces, was demonstrated to the country leaders including Joseph Stalin. The F-22 made a good impression and was sent for ground testing, which was finished on 16 December. In July 1935 the plant was required to produce 10 pieces. In March 1936 four guns were given to the Red Army for testing, which continued until 22 April. Despite some shortcomings, on 11 May 1936 the gun was adopted as the 76 mm divisional gun model 1936 (F-22) (Russian: 76-мм дивизионная пушка образца 1936 года (Ф-22)). The final model lacked a muzzle brake (which – the army said – raised too much dust, revealing the position of the gun) and was rechambered for the model 1900 cartridge to allow use of old 76.2 mm ammunition.

The F-22 was produced by two plants, no. 92 and Kirov Plant, possibly also by "UZTM" (Ural Heavy Machinery Building Plant). Production rate was slow because of more sophisticated construction compared to older guns and because of constant need to fix faults in the design. In 1936 only 10 pieces were produced, in 1937 – 417, in 1938 – 1,002, in 1939 – 1,503. Production was stopped due to adoption of a new gun, the 76 mm divisional gun model 1939 (USV).

== Organization and service ==
=== Soviet Union ===
According to the organization of 1939, each rifle division had two artillery regiments – the light regiment (a battalion of 76 mm guns in three batteries of four guns; two mixed battalions with one battery of 76 mm guns and two batteries of 122 mm howitzers) and the howitzer regiment, totaling 20 76 mm guns per division. In June 1940 the battalion of 76 mm guns was removed, and only 8 guns remained. In March 1942 a third mixed battalion (a battery of 76 mm and a battery of 122 mm) was added, which brought the number of 76 mm guns to 12.

Motorized divisions had two mixed battalions (a battery of 76 mm guns, two batteries of 122 mm howitzers), totaling 8 76 mm guns. Cavalry divisions until August 1941 also had 8 76 mm guns, then the divisional artillery was removed.

The F-22 was also used by anti-tank artillery brigades (24 pieces), from 1942 by tank destroyer brigades with 16 pieces, and by light artillery brigades (60–72 pieces).

The F-22 saw combat for the first time in the Battle of Lake Khasan in 1938. The gun was also used in the Winter War. On 1 June 1941, the Red Army possessed 2,844 F-22s. Many were lost, but a limited number remained in service until the end of the war. For example, two artillery regiments (40 pieces) took part in the Battle of Kursk. It was mostly employed as a field gun, sometimes as anti-tank gun and was apparently never used as anti-aircraft weapon.

=== Other operators ===
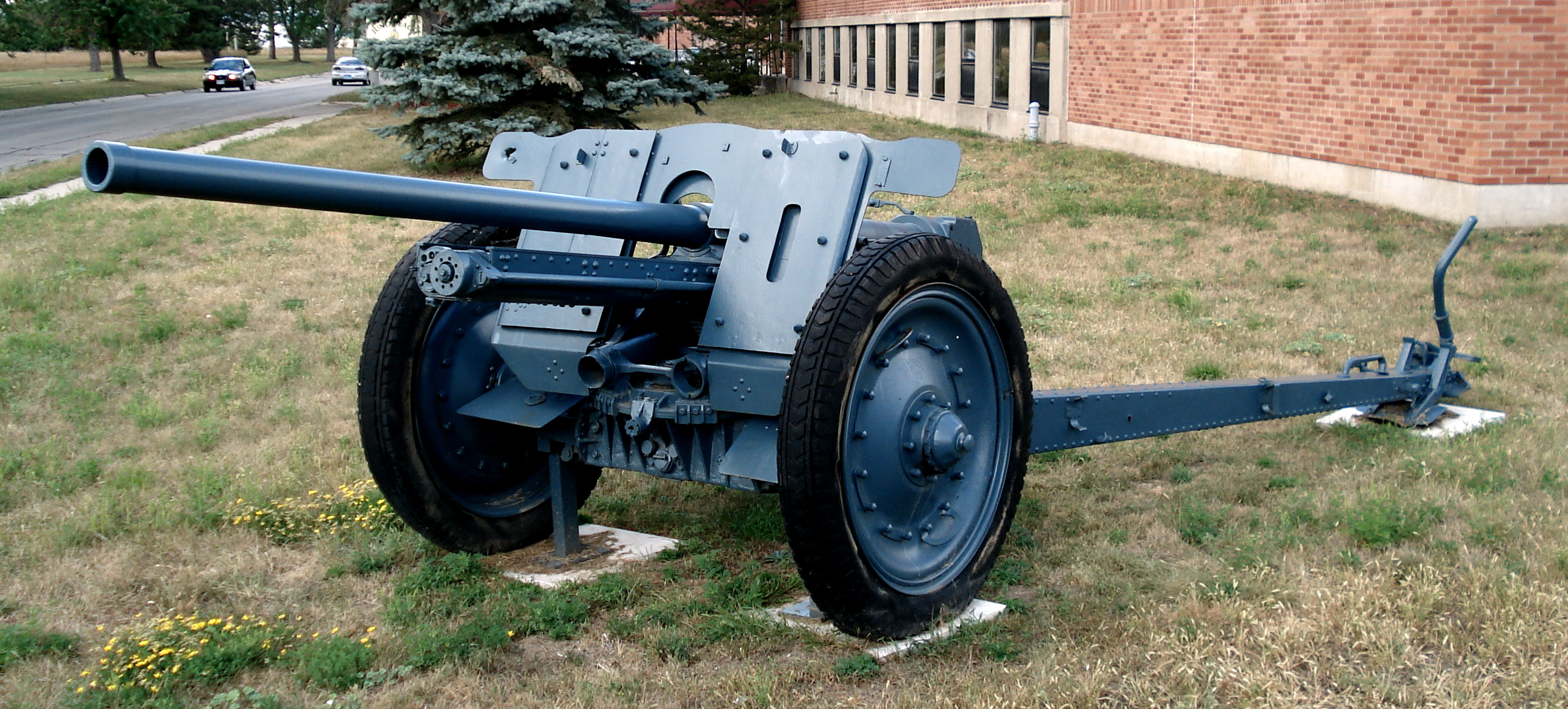
7.62 cm FK 36(r) at CFB Borden.

In 1941-42 the Wehrmacht captured hundreds of F-22s. Initially they were adopted as field guns, designated FK 296(r). In late 1941 it was decided to rebuild the gun as an anti-tank weapon, 7.62 cm PaK 36(r). The modifications included rechambering for a bigger cartridge, a modified recoil system, elevation controls that were moved to the left side of the barrel where the sights resided. Additionally the elevation was limited and most of the guns received a muzzle brake. New ammunition was produced for the gun. The PaK 36(r) reached the battlefield in the spring of 1942. 560 pieces were converted and some of them were used to arm Marder II and Marder III tank destroyers. Nine F-22s in the original configuration were mounted on Sd.Kfz. 6 halftrack tractors, resulting in the Sd.Kfz. 6 mit 7.62 cm FK 36(r).

In Romania, some captured F-22s were mounted on a T-60 light tank chassis to create the TACAM T-60 self-propelled gun. 34 units were built.

The Finnish Army captured 29 guns and bought an additional 47 from German surplus stocks during World War II. The gun was called 76 K 36 in Finnish service. The gun was in active service until the 1960s and was stored until the 1990s.

== Summary ==
The very idea of a 76 mm divisional gun with anti-aircraft capabilities was doomed for the following reasons:

- An anti-aircraft gun needs powerful ballistics and 360° traverse, which makes the gun unnecessarily big and expensive for a divisional gun.
- The main purpose of frontline anti-aircraft guns is protection from dive bombers and low-altitude aircraft, against which small-caliber autocannons are much more effective than a 76 mm gun.

In case of the F-22, the attempt produced a gun which was both a poor anti-aircraft weapon and a mediocre field piece. It lacked 360° traverse and its muzzle velocity fell behind that of even the old 76 mm AA gun model 1915/1928 (730 m/s). The breech automatic mechanism was failing at elevations higher than 60°, reducing the rate of fire. After initial investigations, the RKKA apparently dropped the idea of using the F-22 as anti-aircraft gun – the gun was never equipped with AA shells and with sights suited for the role. There are no reports about actual use of the gun against aircraft. As a divisional gun, the F-22 also had significant shortcomings. It was relatively large and heavy, which limited its mobility. Employment in the anti-tank role was hindered by inconvenient placement of sights and elevation controls on different sides of the barrel. The gun was hard to produce and unreliable. It offered some advantages in range and armor-piercing capability over the 76-mm divisional gun M1902/30, but wasn't significantly better.

As a result, in 1937 requirements for a new divisional gun were issued, eventually resulting in the F-22USV.

However, its German derivative, the 7.62 cm PaK 36(r), performed well in the anti-tank role.

== Ammunition ==
Available ammunition
| Type | Model | Weight, kg | He weight, g | Muzzle velocity, m/s | Range, m |
Armor-piercing shells
| APHE-T | BR-350A | 6,3 | 155 | 690 | 7,000 |
| APHE-T | BR-350B | 6,5 | 119 | 690 | 7,000 |
| AP-T | BR-350BSP | 6,5 | – | 690 | 7,000 |
| Subcaliber (from April 1943) | BR-354P | 3,02 | – | | 500 |
| HEAT, steely iron (from May 1943) | BP-350A | 5,28 | 623 |
High explosive and fragmentation shells
| HE-Fragmentation, steel | OF-350 | 6,2 | 710 | 706 | 13,630 |
| Fragmentation, steely iron | O-350A | 6,21 | 540 | 706 | 13,630 |
| HE-Fragmentation | OF-350V | 6,2 |
| HE-Fragmentation, limited production | OF-363 | 7,1 | | 710 | 14,000 |
| HE, steel, old Russian | F-354 | 6,41 | 785 | 706 | 13,200 |
| HE, steel, old Russian | F-354M | 6,1 | 815 |
| HE, steel, old French | F-354F | 6,41 | 785 |
Shrapnel shells
| Shrapnel with 22 sec / D tube | Sh-354 | 6,5 | 85 (260 bullets) | 652 | 6,000 |
| Shrapnel with T-6 tube | Sh-354T | 6,66 | 85 (250 bullets) | 645 | 9,000 |
| Shrapnel | Sh-354G | 6,58 | 85 |
| Shrapnel | Sh-361 | 6,61 | – | 692 | 8,600 |
Canister shots
| Canister shot | Sh-350 | | 549 bullets | | 200 |
Smoke shells
| Smoke | D-350 | 6,45 | 80 TNT + 505 yellow phosphorus |
| Smoke, steely iron | D-350S | 6,45 | 66 TNT + 380 yellow phosphorus |
Incendiary
| Incendiary, steel | Z-350 | 6,24 | 240 | 705 | 9,600 |
| Incendiary | Z-354 (project 3890) | 6,5 (6,66) | 240 |
| Incendiary | Z-354 | 4,65 | 240 |
Other shells
| Fragmentation-chemical | OH-350 | 6,25 | | 706 | 13,630 |

Armour penetration table
AP Projectile BR-350A
| Distance, m | Meet angle 60°, mm | Meet angle 90°, mm |
| 100 | 67 | 82 |
| 500 | 61 | 75 |
| 1000 | 55 | 67 |
| 1500 | 49 | 60 |
These data was obtained by Soviet methodics of armour penetration measurement (penetration probability equals 80%). They are not directly comparable with western data of similar type
