= Komsomolets armored tractor =

Soviet artillery tractor

T-20 Komsomolets
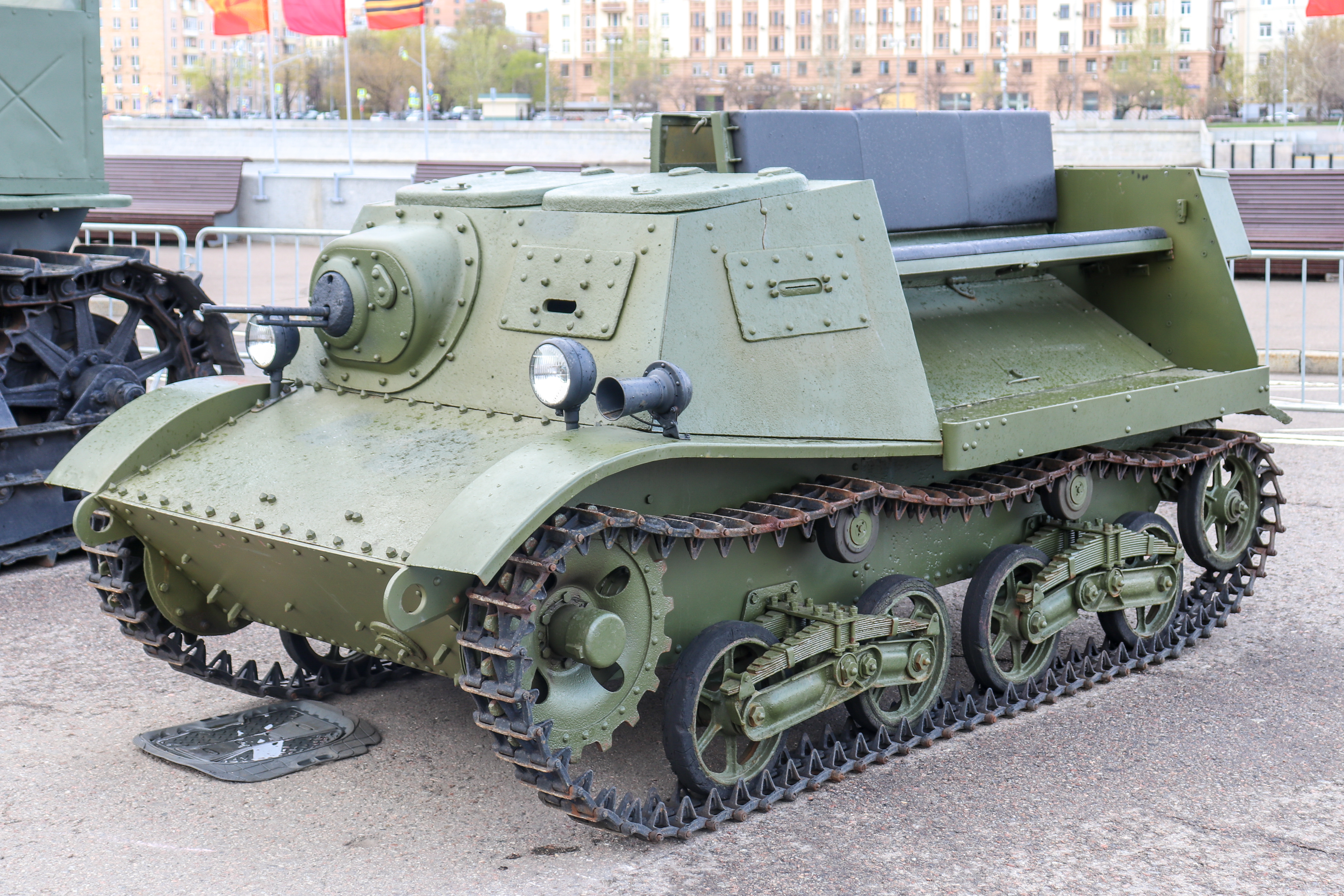
- T-20 artillery tractor
- Type: Artillery tractor
- Place of origin: Soviet Union

Service history
- Used by: Soviet Union; Finland; Nazi Germany; Kingdom of Romania; Kingdom of Hungary
- Wars: World War II

Production history
- Designed: 1936
- Produced: 1937–1941

Specifications
- Mass: 3.5 tonnes
- Length: 3.45 m
- Width: 1.86 m
- Height: 1.58 m
- Crew: 2
- Passengers: 6
- Armor: 7–10 mm
- Main armament: 7.62mm DT machine gun
- Engine: 4-cylinder GAZ-M; 71 hp (53 kW)
- Power/weight: 14 hp/tonne
- Suspension: leaf spring
- Operational range: 250 km
- Maximum speed: 50 km/h

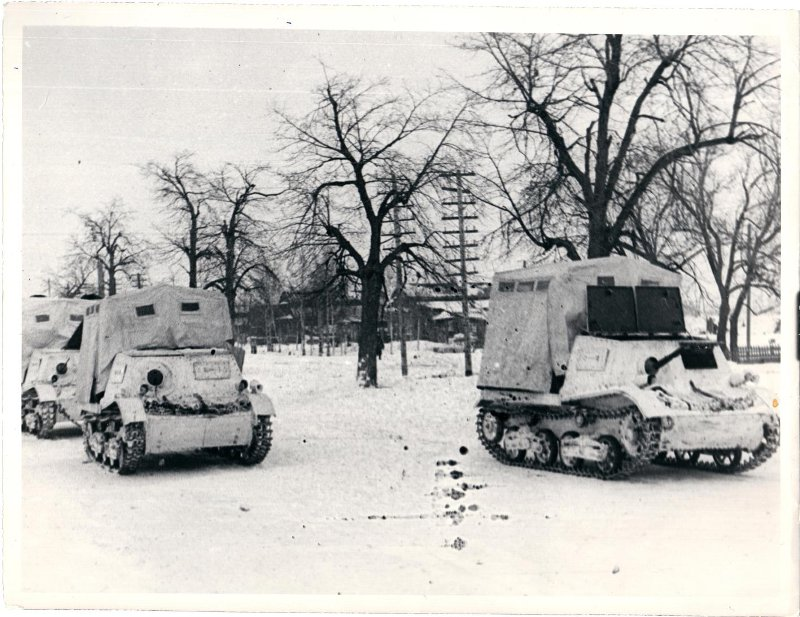
T-20 Komsomolets during a march on the Leningrad Front, November 1942

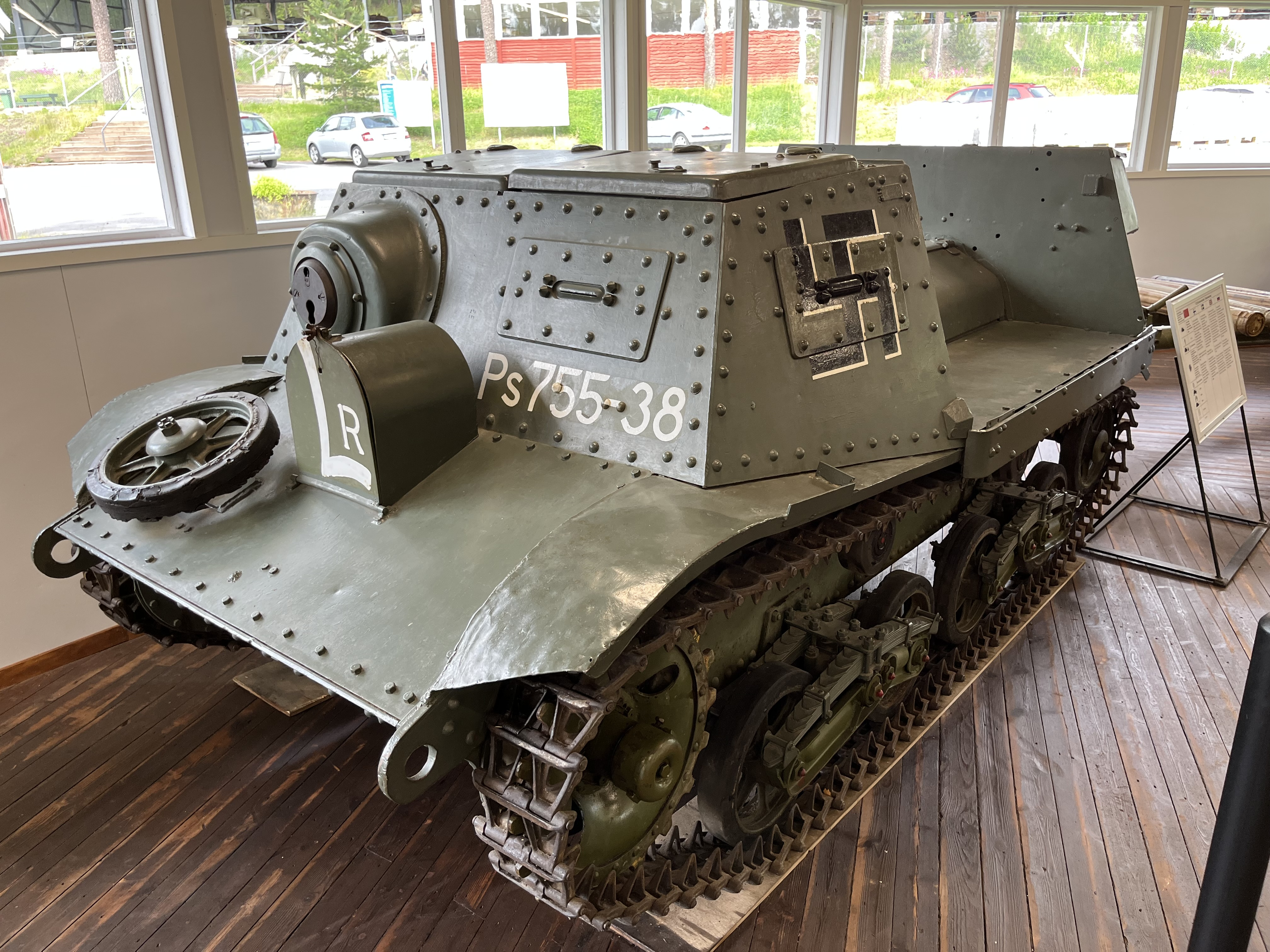
Finnish T-20 Komsomolets renovated to its Continuation War appearance. Parola Tank Museum.

T-20 armored tractor Komsomolets (Bronirovannyy gusenichnyy tyagach Komsomolets T-20), an armored continuous track tractor, the T-20 was a prime mover vehicle used by the Soviet Union during the Winter War and World War II.

== Description ==
The T-20 was designed in 1936 at the Ordzhonikidze Moscow Plant no.37. They were manufactured during 1937–1941 at Factory no. 37, as well as at STZ and GAZ.

The tractor was designed to tow light artillery pieces such as the 45mm anti-tank gun and the 120mm heavy mortar. The tractor could tow the weapons themselves plus a small quantity of ammunition, usually towed in a limber, along with up to six crewmen. Occasionally, two limbers were towed to increase the ammunition supply.

The forward compartment provided space for the driver and vehicle commander. It was fully armored and had a ball-mounted DT machine gun. The rear compartment held the gun crews, seated back-to-back in outward-facing bench seats. A canvas top could be erected for protection in poor weather.

Approximately 4401 T-20 tractors were built between 1937 and 1941.

== Combat use ==
Although the Komsomolets T-20 armored tractor was designed as a prime mover, some vehicles were used in combat during 1941. The tractor was also employed as a tankette.

== Operators ==
The T-20 tractor was used by the Red Army during the Soviet invasion of Poland, the Winter War and during World War II. During Operation Barbarossa, some T-20 tractors were used as armored fighting vehicles, though after 1941 they were used only as artillery tractors.

Both Finland and Nazi Germany used captured vehicles.

Romania captured 36 T-20 tractors by 1 November 1941. During the spring and summer of 1943, all but two of these were refurbished by the Romanians. Because these vehicles were based on an agricultural tractor of which very large numbers had been captured in Transnistria, and because their Ford-type engines were familiar to the Romanians and spares were available, the tractors' overhaul and maintenance were simple tasks. In early 1944 they were fitted with hooks which enabled them to tow the 50 mm Pak 38 anti-tank gun. The 34 tractors (known officially as Șenileta Ford Rusesc de Captură – "Captured Russian Ford tracked carrier") were subsequently issued to the 5th and 14th Infantry Divisions (twelve each), the 2nd Armoured Regiment (six) and the 5th Cavalry Division (four). All were apparently lost during the subsequent battles or confiscated by the Soviets after the 23 August coup.

== Variants ==
An expedient variant was built in 1941, the ZiS-30, mounting the ZIS-2 57mm anti-tank gun.

The Germans also modified some captured examples by mounting a 3.7 cm Pak 36 anti-tank gun on top.

== See also ==
- M29 Weasel – (United States)
- Raupenschlepper, Ost – (Nazi Germany)
- Universal Carrier – (United Kingdom)
- Loyd Carrier – (United Kingdom)
- Renault UE Chenillette – (France)
- Lorraine 37L – (France)
