= ZiS-30 =

Soviet tank destroyer

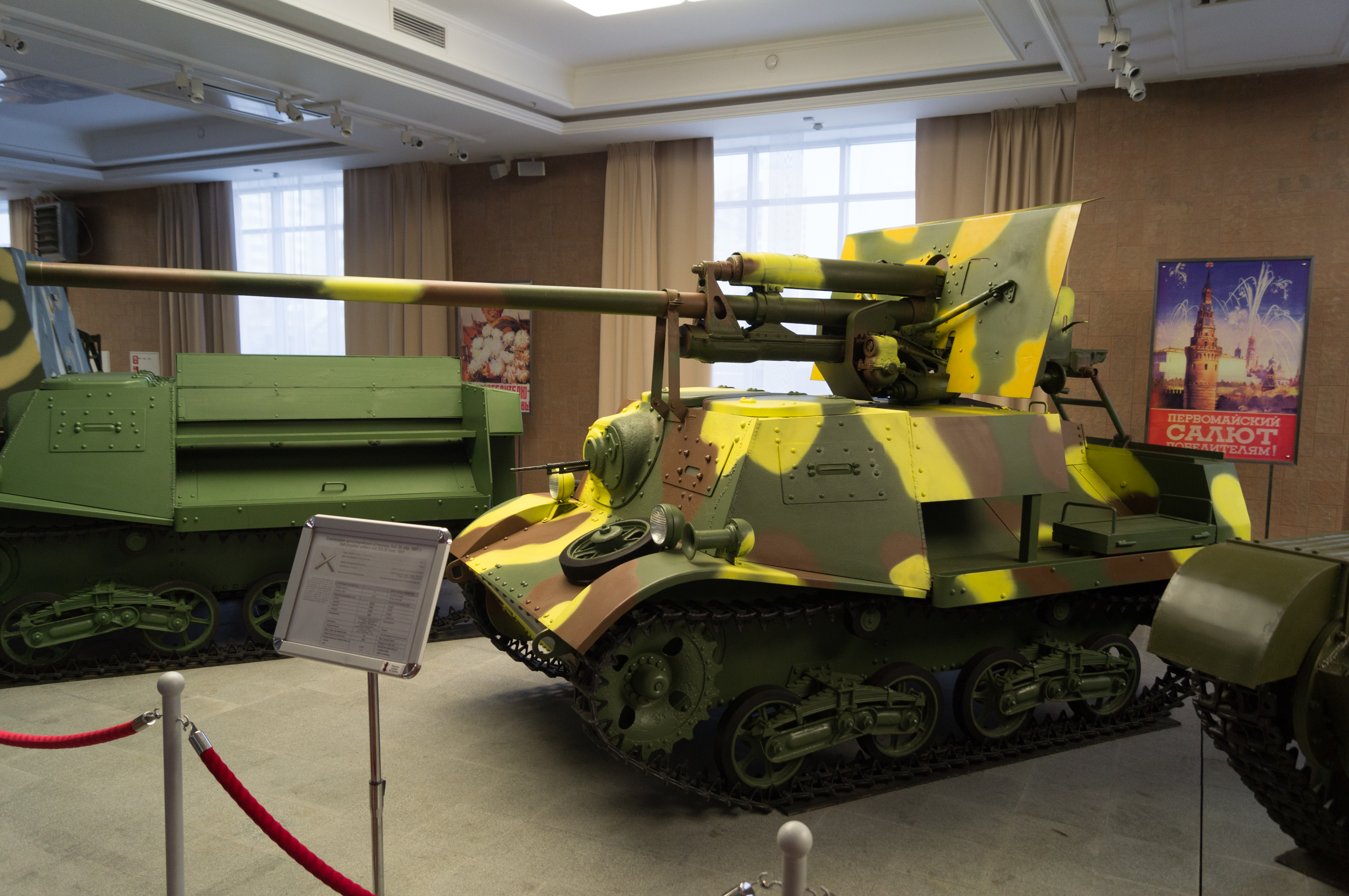
- ZiS-30 in Verkhnyaya Pyshma Tank Museum.
- Type: Tank destroyer
- Place of origin: Soviet Union

Production history
- No. built: ~100

Specifications
- Mass: 4 tonnes (4.4 short tons; 3.9 long tons)
- Length: 3.45 m (excluding gun)
- Width: 1.86 m
- Crew: 4–5
- Armor: 7–10 mm
- Main armament: 57 mm ZiS-2 gun
- Secondary armament: 7.62 mm DT machine gun
- Engine: GAZ-M, 4-cylinder gasoline engine 50 hp (37 kW)
- Suspension: Leaf spring
- Operational range: 250 km
- Maximum speed: Road: 40 km/h

The ZiS-30 was a light self-propelled anti-tank gun built for the Soviet Red Army in 1941. It was based on the Komsomolets armoured artillery tractor. They were successful vehicles, but production was limited by the number of Komsomolets tractors still in use.

== Production history ==
The ZiS-30 was one of a few hastily designed armoured fighting vehicles created by Soviet industry shortly after the German invasion during Operation Barbarossa in 1941. In August 1941 Grabin's design bureau at the Gorky plant no. 92 mounted the 57 mm ZiS-2 gun onto the chassis of a Komsomolets artillery tractor. Only around 100 were produced. As one example of its employment, on October 2 the 21st Tank Brigade, under 30th Army in the Kalinin area, included a battery of four ZiS-30s. By October 20 three of these remained on strength. This brigade also had ten T-34-57s which carried the ZiS-4 tank model of the ZiS-2.

For its era, the ZiS-2 gun was one of the most powerful dedicated anti-tank guns available. Most weapons of that time were between 20 and 50 mm size, making the ZiS-2 somewhat larger at 57 mm, but it was also much longer, with a larger breech firing far more powerful ammunition. It fired a 3 kg shell at a muzzle velocity of 990 m/s, more typical of late-war weapons than early ones. For comparison, the British Army's contemporary 2-pounder fired a 40 mm shell of just over 1 kg at around 800 m/s, and the 6-pounder that replaced it fired a 2.3 kg shell at 850 m/s. The mounting on the Komsomolets was relatively simple, essentially cutting out the driving area enough to allow the carriage to be placed into the hole, and then cutting off the rear of the carriage so it did not overhang the back of the tractor. The result left the gun with a relatively wide angle of fire but swinging it to its extremes placed the breech well off the side of the vehicle. Wooden running boards on either side of the rear deck could be folded out to provide working area for the gunner and loader when the gun was swung in this fashion.

Although the drivers were protected under light armor, the gunner and loader were protected only by a light gun shield on the front of the breech. They were completely exposed on the sides and rear, and the relatively high profile of the deck made them easy targets.

Zis-30 in action during WW2
