= 57 55 J =

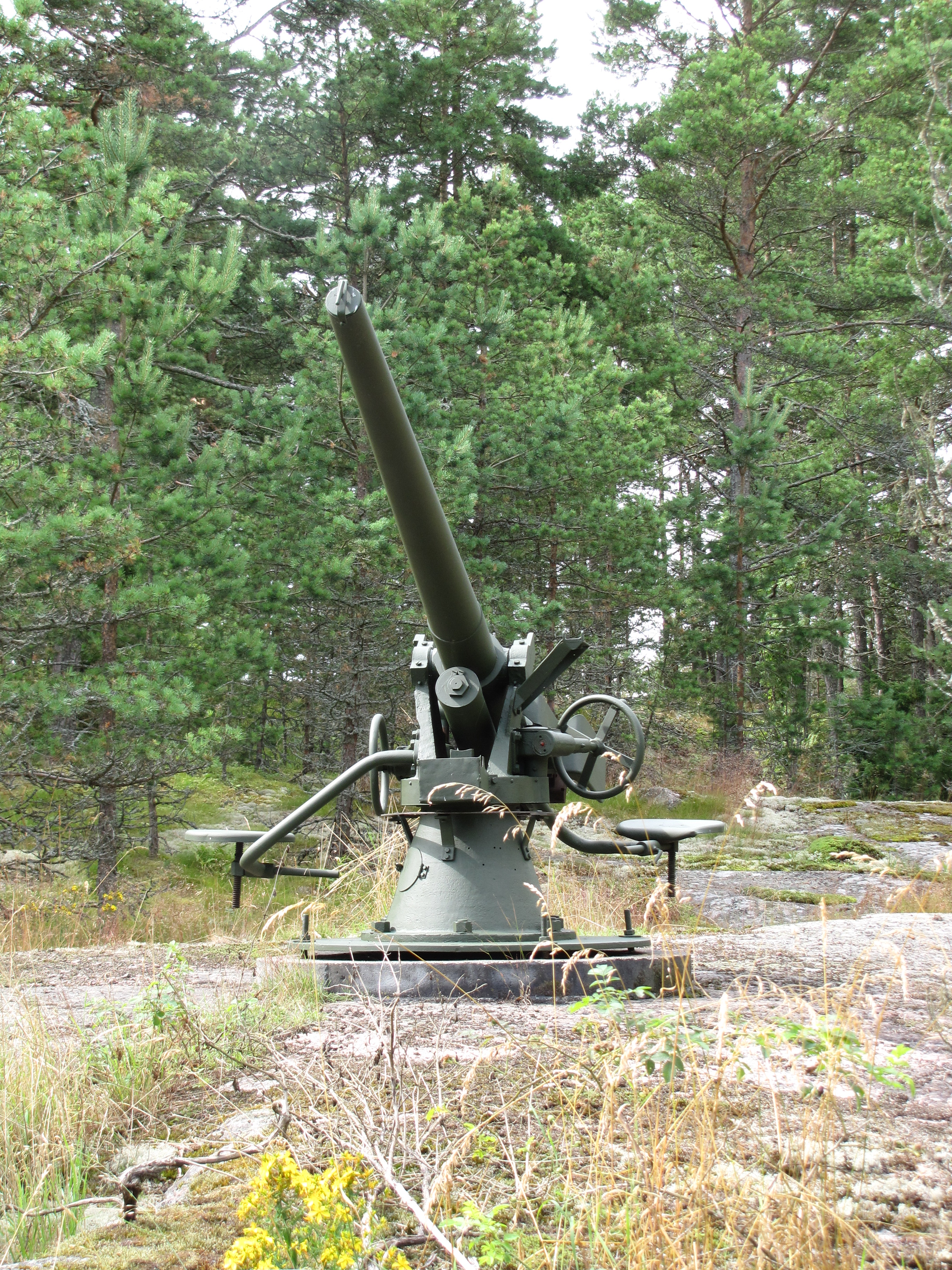
- 57 55 J in Kuivasaari 2009 (without gunshield)
- Type: Light coastal gun
- Place of origin: Finland

Service history
- In service: 1950–1965

Production history
- Designer: Antero Jokinen
- Designed: 1941
- Manufacturer: Valtion Tykkitehdas
- Produced: 1944–1945
- No. built: 11

Specifications
- Mass: 955 kg (2,105 lb)
- Barrel length: Total: 3.151 m (10 ft 4 in); Bore: 2.53 m (8 ft 4 in)
- Caliber: 57 mm (2.2 in)
- Breech: Vertical sliding-block
- Carriage: Fixed cone mount
- Elevation: −10° to +32°
- Muzzle velocity: Actual: 660 m/s (2,200 ft/s); Planned: 900 m/s (3,000 ft/s)
- Maximum firing range: Actual: 9 km (5.6 mi); Planned: 12.8 km (8 mi)
- Feed system: Semi-automatic

The 57 55 J or 57 mm, 55 caliber length model Jokinen coastal gun is a Finnish light coastal gun designed during the Continuation War. It the first coastal gun designed and manufactured completely in Finland and was intended to replace the older 57 mm Nordenfelt and Hotchkiss guns, but the design was found faulty and only 11 pieces were constructed. They were used for training after World War II until retired in the mid–1960s.

== Background ==
The gun was developed to replace the older 57 mm Nordenfelt and Hotchkiss guns which, while still usable, were getting old and only had iron sights for aiming. The desire of the Finnish Navy headquarters operational section to begin domestic manufacturing of coastal and naval guns also influenced the decision to develop 57 55 J. The prototype, partially based on the older Nordenfelt and Hotchkiss guns, was designed by Engineering Lieutenant Colonel Antero Albert Jokinen and was finished in 1941 in the Helsinki naval base. A series of 50 guns was ordered from Valtion Tykkitehdas (VTT, State Artillery Factory) in Jyväskylä at the turn of 1941 and 1942, but only 10 guns were built in 1944–1945. With the prototype included, the final number was 11 complete pieces.

== Design flaws ==
When the guns were test-fired in Jyväskylä, it was found that the slide of the semi-automatic mechanism was not strong enough and could bend. The second serious flaw was ammunition. The gunpowder ordered from Valtion Ruutitehdas (State Gunpowder Factory) was designed to produce a barrel pressure of 2800 atm resulting in muzzle velocity of 900 m/s. But when the same gunpowder batch was tested two years later, it produced a barrel pressure of 3500 atm, resulting in unacceptable barrel wear. At first Jokinen intended to settle for a muzzle velocity of 800 m/s, but in the end the muzzle velocity was reduced to 660–670 m/s, no better than the older 57 mm guns. Antero Jokinen was later criticized for attempting to build a "too good" gun, without considering the abilities of the Finnish industry at the time.

== Service use ==
The 57 55 J was accepted for use as a training weapon in the 1950s because of a lack of suitable training guns and no funds to buy new ones. The old 57 mm Nordenfelt and Hotchkiss guns were worn-out, and 76 mm guns were kept in reserve, so the 57 55 J units, among other old guns, were used as training pieces. Some of the guns were converted for sub-caliber training^{A} for the 234/50 Be and 305/52 O guns. The guns were refurbished at the beginning of the 1960s and sub-caliber guns were converted back to the normal configuration, but the guns were removed from use and placed into storage in 1965–1966.

== Notes ==
^A Sub-caliber training in this context refers to attaching a smaller weapon into a bigger one to reduce wear on the actual weapon. In the case of the 57 55 J, the gun, stripped of mounting and most other equipment, was attached into a barrel of a heavy gun. The 57 55 J was located outside the actual gun and fired normal ammunition; thus this does not refer to modern sabot ammunition or inner tube mounts.
