= 76 mm divisional gun M1942 (ZiS-3) =

76-mm divisional gun M1942 (ZiS-3)
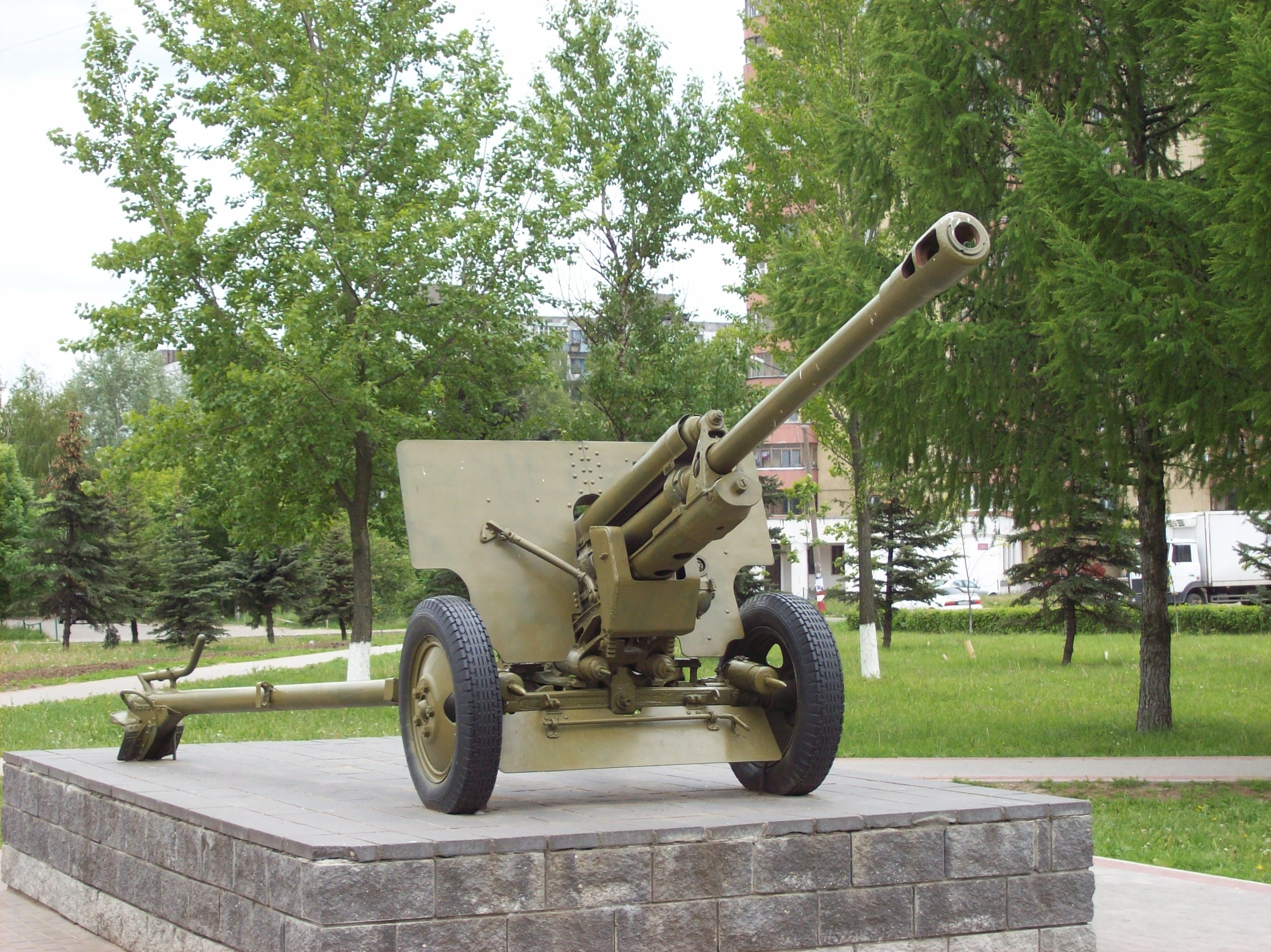
- ZiS-3 in Nizhny Novgorod, Russia
- Type: Field gun
- Place of origin: Soviet Union

Service history
- In service: 1942–present
- Wars: World War II; Korean War; Vietnam War; Cambodian Civil War; Portuguese Colonial War; Angolan Civil War; South African Border War; Uganda–Tanzania War; Lebanese Civil War; Soviet–Afghan War; Yugoslav Wars; Russo-Ukrainian War; War in Donbas

Production history
- Designer: design bureau of No. 92 Artillery Factory headed by V. G. Grabin
- Designed: 1940
- Produced: 1941–1945
- No. built: 103,000+

Specifications
- Mass: combat: 1,116 kg (2,460 lb) travel: 2,150 kg (4,730 lbs)
- Barrel length: 3.4 m (11 ft 2 in) 42.6 calibers
- Width: 1.6 m (5 ft 3 in)
- Height: 1.37 m (4 ft 6 in)
- Crew: 7 artillerymen
- Shell: Fixed QF 76.2×385mmR
- Caliber: 76.2 mm (3.00 in)
- Breech: Semi-automatic vertical sliding-wedge
- Recoil: Hydro-pneumatic
- Carriage: Split trail
- Elevation: −5° to +37°
- Traverse: 54°
- Rate of fire: up to 25 rounds per minute
- Maximum firing range: 13.29 km (8.25 mi)

The 76-mm divisional gun M1942 (ZiS-3) (Russian: 76-мм дивизионная пушка обр. 1942 г. [ЗиС-3]) (GRAU index: 52-P-354U) was a Soviet 76.2 mm divisional field gun used during World War II. ZiS was a factory designation and stood for Zavod imeni Stalina ("factory named after Stalin"), the honorific title of Artillery Factory No. 92, which first constructed this gun.

== History ==
Artillery Factory No. 92 began designing the ZiS-3 at the end of 1940. The ZiS-3 combined the light carriage from the 57 mm ZiS-2 anti-tank gun and the powerful 76.2 mm barrel from the F-22USV, the previous divisional field gun. The addition of a muzzle brake reduced recoil and prevented damage to the light carriage upon firing. Producing a ZiS-3 cost only a third of the time and two-thirds of the money of a F-22USV by making greater use of casting, stamping and welding.

V. G. Grabin, the chief designer of Soviet medium caliber guns, initiated the gun's development without state approval, and the prototype was hidden from the state. Marshal Grigory Kulik, commander of Soviet artillery, had ordered a halt to the production of light 45 mm anti-tank guns and 76.2 mm divisional field guns in the belief that they were inadequate; the Soviets overestimated the armour protection of the latest German heavy tanks from propaganda about the Neubaufahrzeug multi-turreted prototype tank.

The beginning of the Great Patriotic War revealed that the pre-war 76 mm guns overmatched German armour; in some cases even 12.7 mm DShK machine guns were adequate. Most of the 76 mm guns were lost early in the war; some captured examples armed German Panzerjäger self-propelled guns. Marshal Kulik ordered the F-22USV back into production. At Artillery Factory No. 92, Grabin put the ZiS-3 into mass production in December 1941.

The factory's ZiS-3 stockpile grew and went unused as the Red Army refused to accept the guns without the usual acceptance trials. Grabin convinced the army to issue the guns for impromptu testing at the front, where it proved superior to existing divisional field guns. A subsequent demonstration impressed Joseph Stalin, who praised the weapon as "a masterpiece of artillery systems design." The ZiS-3 underwent an official five-day acceptance trial in February 1942, and was then accepted into service as divisional field gun model 1942 (full official name). Grabin worked to increase production at Artillery Factory No. 92. Conveyor assembly lines admitted the use of low-skilled labour without significant quality loss. Experienced laborers and engineers worked on complicated equipment and served as brigade leaders; they were replaced on the production line by young factory workers who were exempt from conscription, producing a new generation of skilled labourers and engineers. More than 103,000 ZiS-3s were produced by the end of the war, making it the most numerous Soviet field gun during the war.

Mass production of the ZiS-3 ceased after the war. It was replaced by the 85 mm D-44 divisional field gun. The D-44 had better anti-armour capabilities, but inferior mobility due to its increased weight.

The Finns captured 12 units, and designated them 76 K 42.

=== Derivatives ===
At least one ZiS-3 was produced at the Reșița Works in Reșița, Romania, during 1943. This Romanian-produced copy was tested against several Romanian-designed prototypes as well as some foreign models, until eventually one of the Romanian prototypes was selected for serial production as the 75 mm Reșița M1943. This gun had incorporated a number of features from the ZiS-3. At least 375 75 mm Reșița M1943 guns were produced by Romania, including three prototypes; the gun was later mounted on the Mareșal tank destroyer.

=== Self-propelled mounts ===
The SU-76 was an assault gun mounting the ZiS-3 on the chassis of a T-70 light tank. More than 14,000 were produced between 1942 and 1945. The Romanian TACAM R-2 tank destroyer was a R-2 tank converted to mount the ZiS-3 in a three-sided fighting compartment. The KSP-76 was a wartime light assault car mounting the ZiS-3; it did not advance beyond the prototype stage.

== Ammunition data ==
Available ammunition
Type	Model	Weight, kg	HE weight, g
Armour-piercing projectiles (muzzle velocity 700 m/s)
APHE	BR-350A	6.3	155
AP (solid)	BR-350SP	6.5	N/A
Composite Armour-piercing projectiles (muzzle velocity up to 950 m/s)
From April 1943	BR-350P	3.02	N/A
Developed after World War II	BR-350N	3.02	N/A
High explosive and fragmentation shells (muzzle velocity 680 m/s)
HE/Fragmentation steel	OF-350	6.2	710
HE/Fragmentation steely iron	OF-350A	6.2	640
Fragmentation steely iron	O-350A	6.21	540
HE/Fragmentation	OF-350B	6.2	540
HE/Fragmentation	OF-363	6.2	540
HE	F-354	6.41	785
HE	F-354M	6.1	815
HE developed in France	F-354F	6.41	785
Other projectiles (muzzle velocity up to 680 m/s)
HEAT, developed after World War II	BK-354	7	740
HEAT, from May 1943	BP-350M	3.94	623
Shrapnel	Sh-354	6.5	85
Shrapnel	Sh-354T	6.66	85
Shrapnel	Sh-354G	6.58	85
Shrapnel	Sh-361	6.61	85
Chemical	OH-350	6.25
Incendiary long-range	Z-350	6.24	240
Incendiary	Z-354	4.65	240
Smoke long-range	D-350	6.45	N/A
Smoke steely iron	D-350A	6.45	N/A

Armour penetration table
AP Projectile BR-350A
Distance, m	Meet angle 60°, mm	Meet angle 90°, mm
100	67	82
500	61	75
1000	55	67
1500	49	60
2000	43	53
These data were obtained by Soviet methods of armour penetration measurement (penetration probability equals 75%). They are not directly comparable with western data of similar type.

== Combat history ==
The tactical characteristics of the 76.2-mm guns (M1939 and 1942) are their high rate of fire, good muzzle velocity, and great maneuverability. These guns are employed in close support of infantry ( tanks), and especially for direct fire. Their primary missions are destruction of personnel and neutralization of infantry weapons in the open; antipersonnel barrages; destruction of tanks, vehicles, embrasures, and dragon's teeth by direct fire; and harassing fire. Secondary missions are accompanying barrages and concentrations; neutralization of artillery and mortars; establishment of smoke screens; and destruction of wire. Exceptional missions are fire reconnaissance, destruction of light materiel with indirect fire, and destruction of minefields.

— Technical Manual, TM 30-530

Soviet soldiers liked the ZiS-3 for its extreme reliability, durability, and accuracy. The gun was easy to maintain and use by novice crews. The light carriage allowed the ZiS-3 to be towed by trucks, heavy jeeps, like American Lend-Lease-supplied Dodge WC-51/WC-52, simply called the 'Dodge 3/4'-tons by Soviet troops – or even manually hauled by the crew if required.

The gun was also quite popular with the German Wehrmacht. The gun was introduced into German service as the 7.62 cm Feldkanone 288(r) and factories were retooled to produce ammunition for it. Unlike its predecessors, there exists no conversion to use the grenade cartridge of the 7.5 cm PaK 40 with a larger propellant charge to improve armor penetration capabilities. This is because in case of the M1936 F-22 and the M1939 F-22 USV the increased recoil was counteracted by adding a muzzle brake, which was not possible for the ZiS-3, which already had one.

The ZiS-3 had good anti-armour capabilities. Its armour-piercing round could knock out any early German light and medium tank. The frontal armour of later tanks, like the Tiger I and later the Panther, however, were immune to the ZiS-3.

A ZiS-3 battery had four guns, with three batteries making a division or battalion. Independent anti-tank regiments consisted of six batteries with no divisions. A staff battery included a fire-control section.

The ZiS-3 saw combat service with North Korean forces during the Korean War (1950–1953). It was also deployed by the People's Armed Forces for the Liberation of Angola (FAPLA) during the Angolan Civil War and the South African Border War and by Tanzania People's Defence Force during the Uganda–Tanzania War in 1978–1979.

== Post-Cold War ==
The ZiS-3 was exported to Soviet allies during the Cold War, who in turn exported it to Third World countries. In Europe, Austria received about 36 of them in 1955 and kept them in service until 1991 under the designation PaK-M42. In the 1990s, both the Croatian Army and the Army of the Republic of Serb Krajina used it.

In 2014, at least one ZiS-3 was used by pro-Russian separatists against the Ukrainian Armed Forces during the War in Donbas.

In 2016, the gun remained in active service with the armies of at least six sovereign nations: Cambodia, Nicaragua, Namibia, Sudan, Mozambique, and Tanzania. Mozambique at the time operated the largest number of ZiS-3s, with 180 in service.

By 2020, the gun only remained in active service with Cambodia, Namibia, Nicaragua, and Sudan. A number of other nations, including Russia and Zimbabwe, retain functioning ZiS-3s to fire gun salutes during ceremonial occasions.

== Conflicts ==
- World War II
- Vietnam War
- South African Border War
- Angolan Civil War
- Uganda–Tanzania War
- Soviet–Afghan War
- Russo-Ukrainian War
  - War in Donbas

== Operators ==
=== Current operators ===
- Cambodia
- Namibia
- Nicaragua
- North Korea
- Russia: Ceremonial purposes.
- Sudan
- Vietnam: At least one gun used by 242nd Island Defense Brigade
- Zimbabwe: Some in service during the early 1980s. Today the ZiS-3 is still used for ceremonial purposes.

=== Former operators ===
- Afghanistan
- Albania
- Algeria
- Angola
  - UNITA
- Austria
- Bulgaria
- China
- Congo
- Croatia
- Cuba
- Cyprus
- Czechoslovakia
- Egypt
- Ethiopia
- Finland
- Germany
- East Germany
- Ghana
- Hungary
- Indonesia
- Nigeria
- Madagascar
- Morocco
- Mozambique
- Poland
- Romania
- Somalia
- Soviet Union
- Tanzania
- Uganda
- North Yemen
- Yugoslavia
- Zambia

== Gallery ==
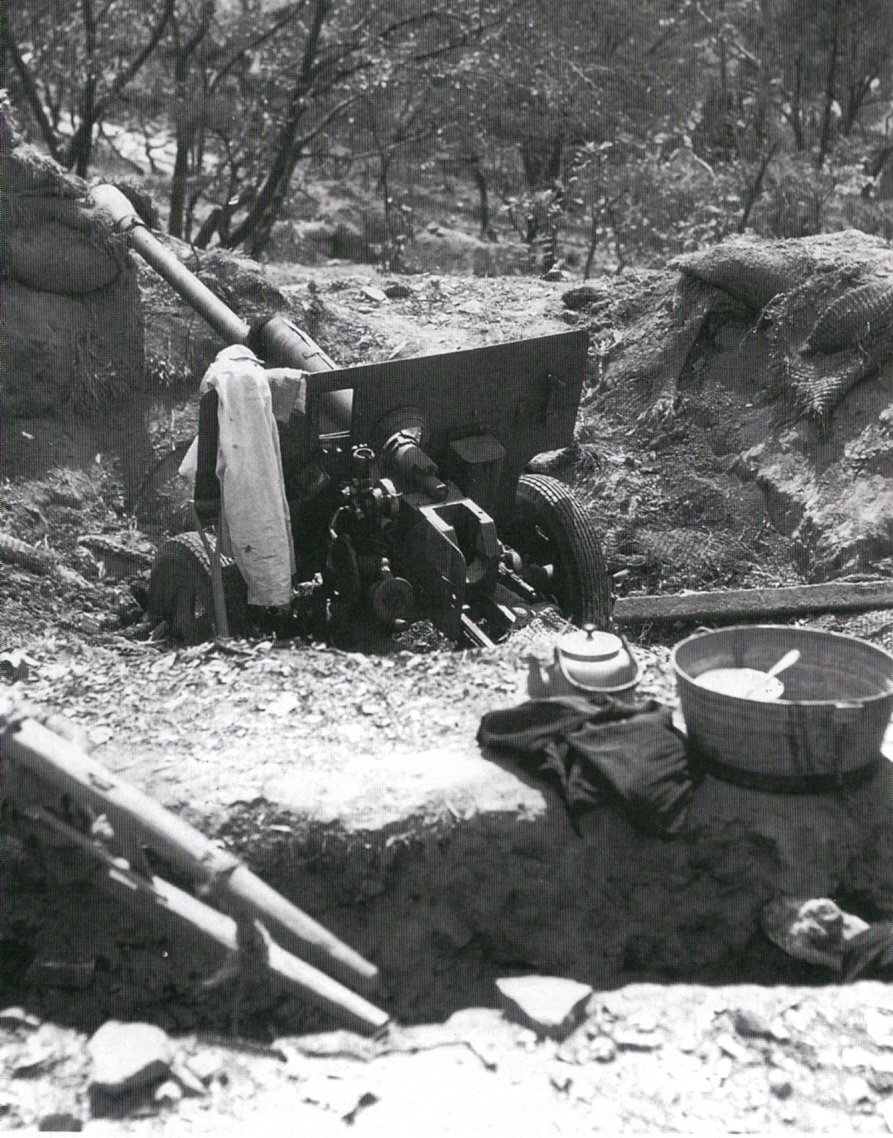
A North Korean ZiS-3 captured by United Nations forces during the Incheon Landings in mid-September 1950.

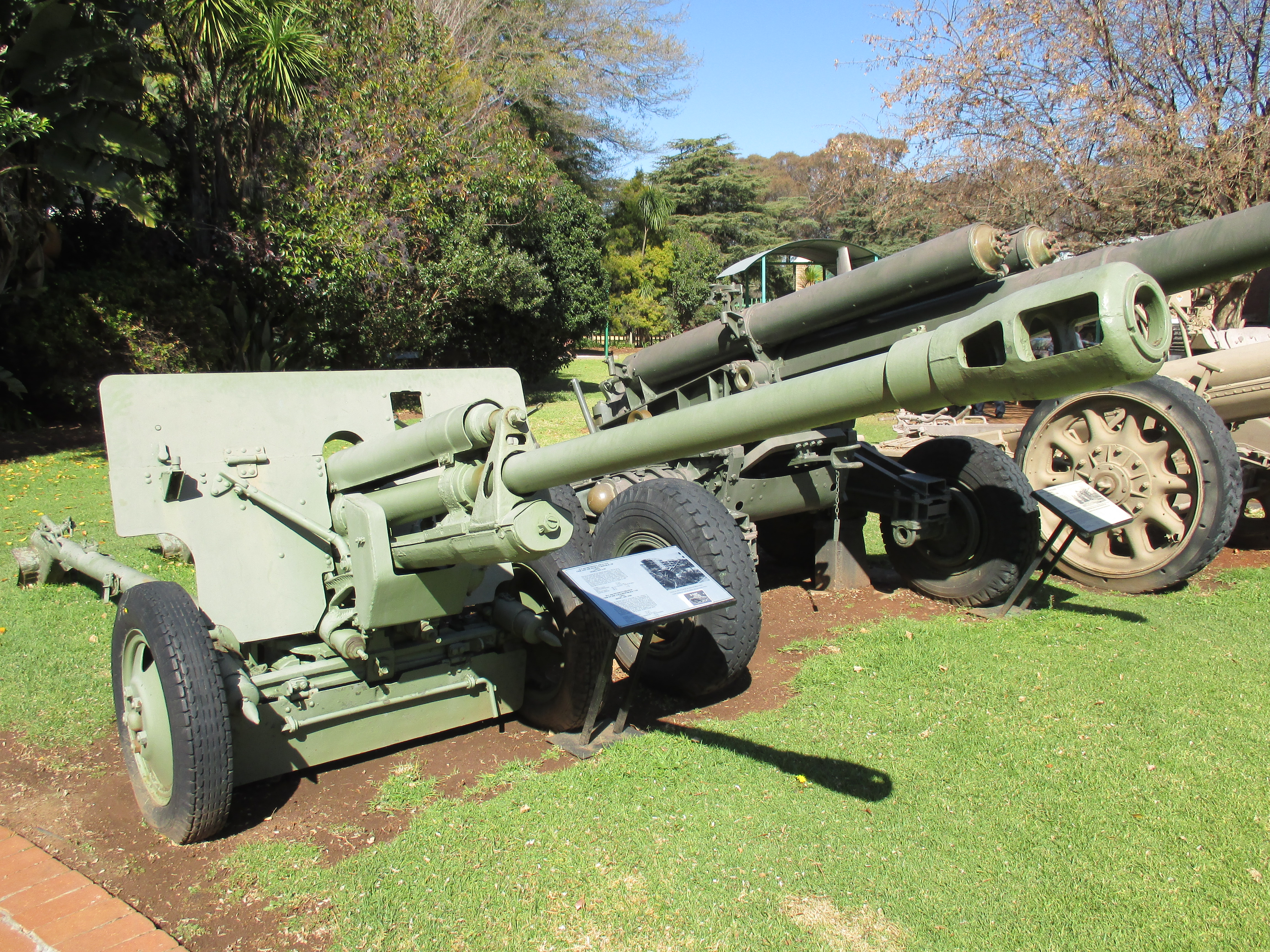
ZiS-3 displayed at the South African National Museum of Military History, Johannesburg.

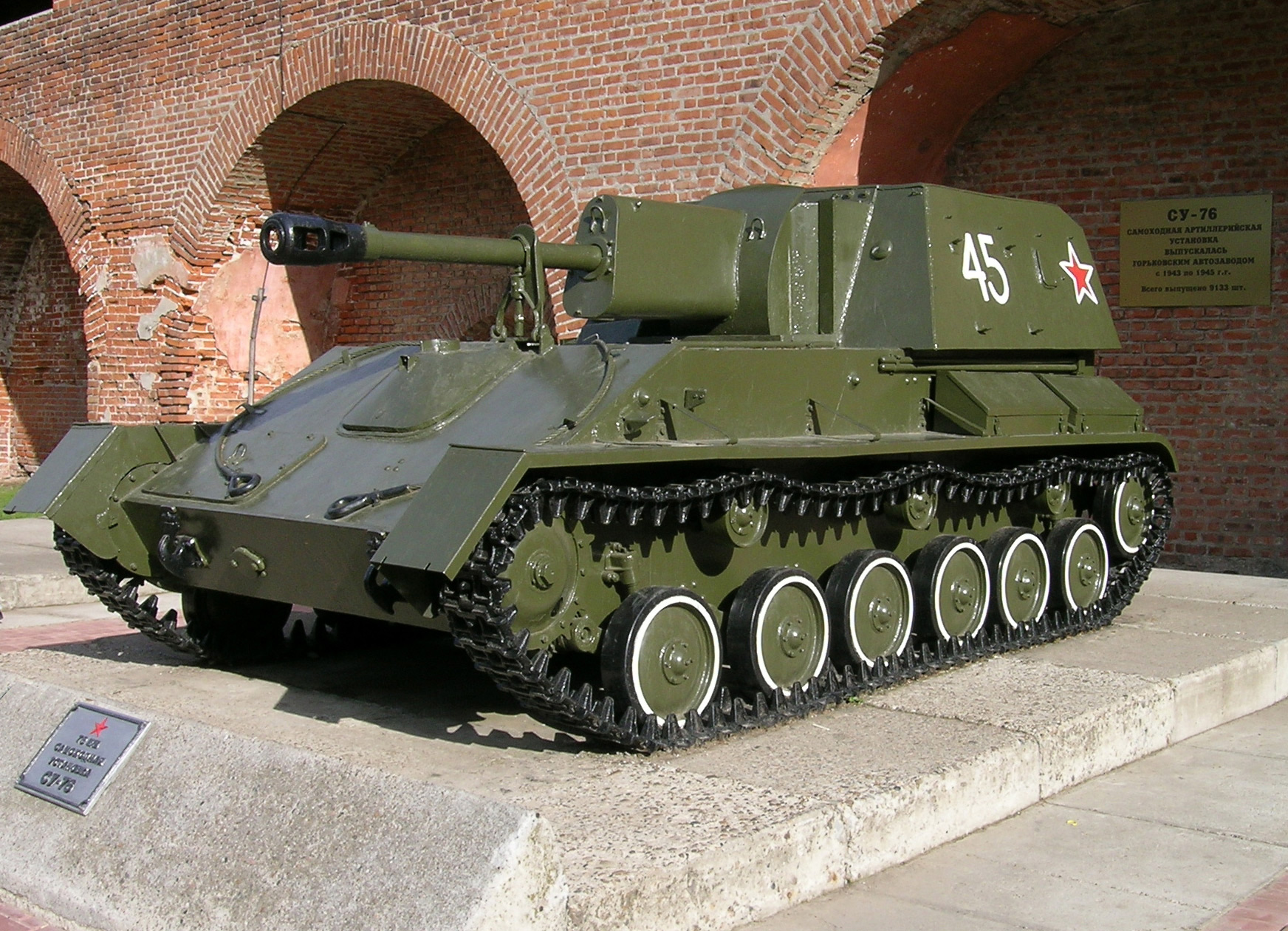
A SU-76 self-propelled gun.

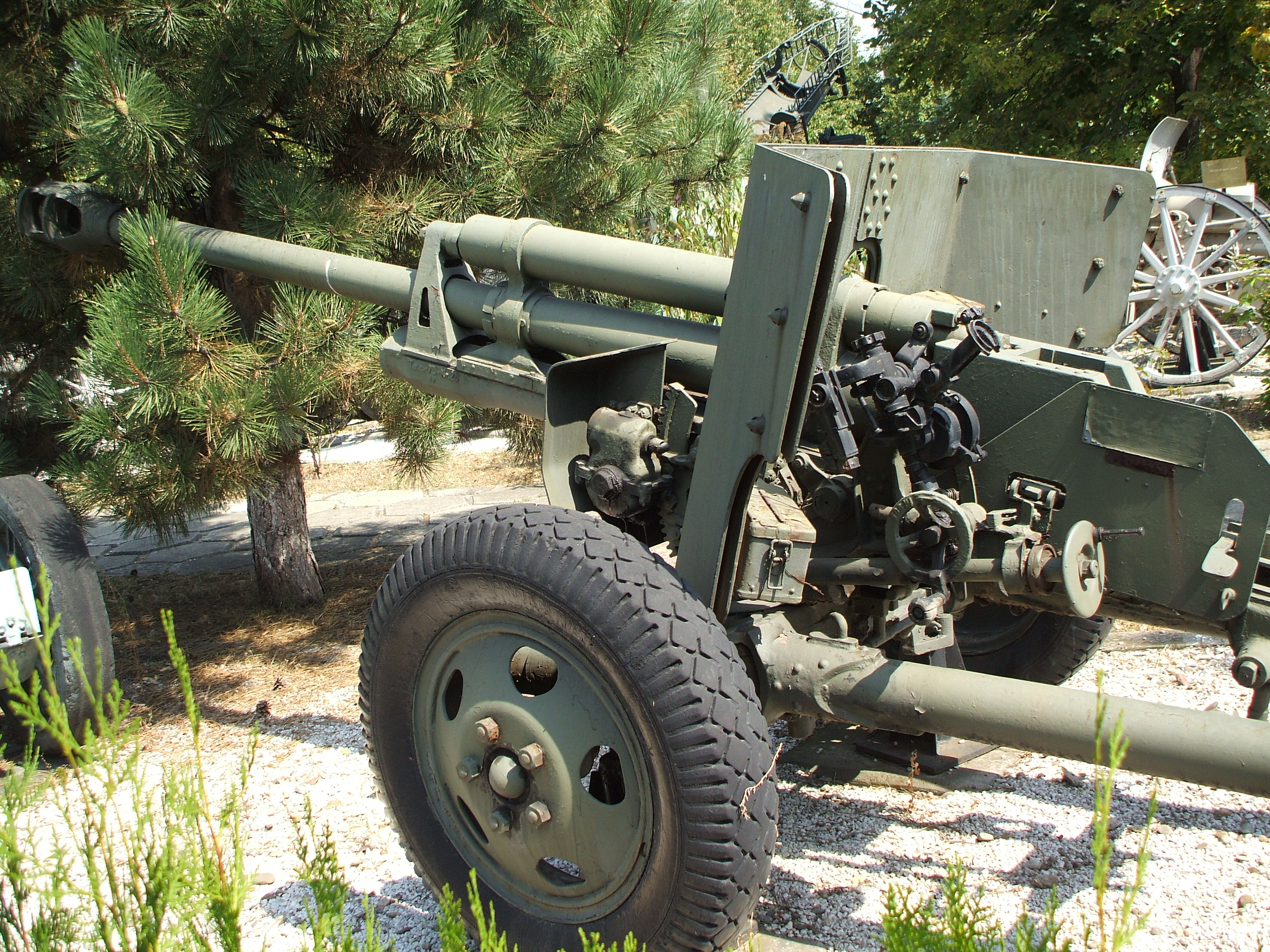
The Romanian 75 mm Reșița M1943 used features of the 76 mm ZiS-3.

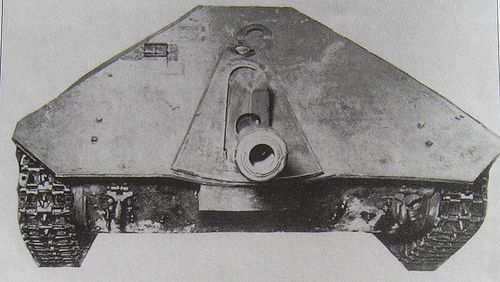
The prototype Romanian Mareșal tank destroyer which mounted a ZiS-3.

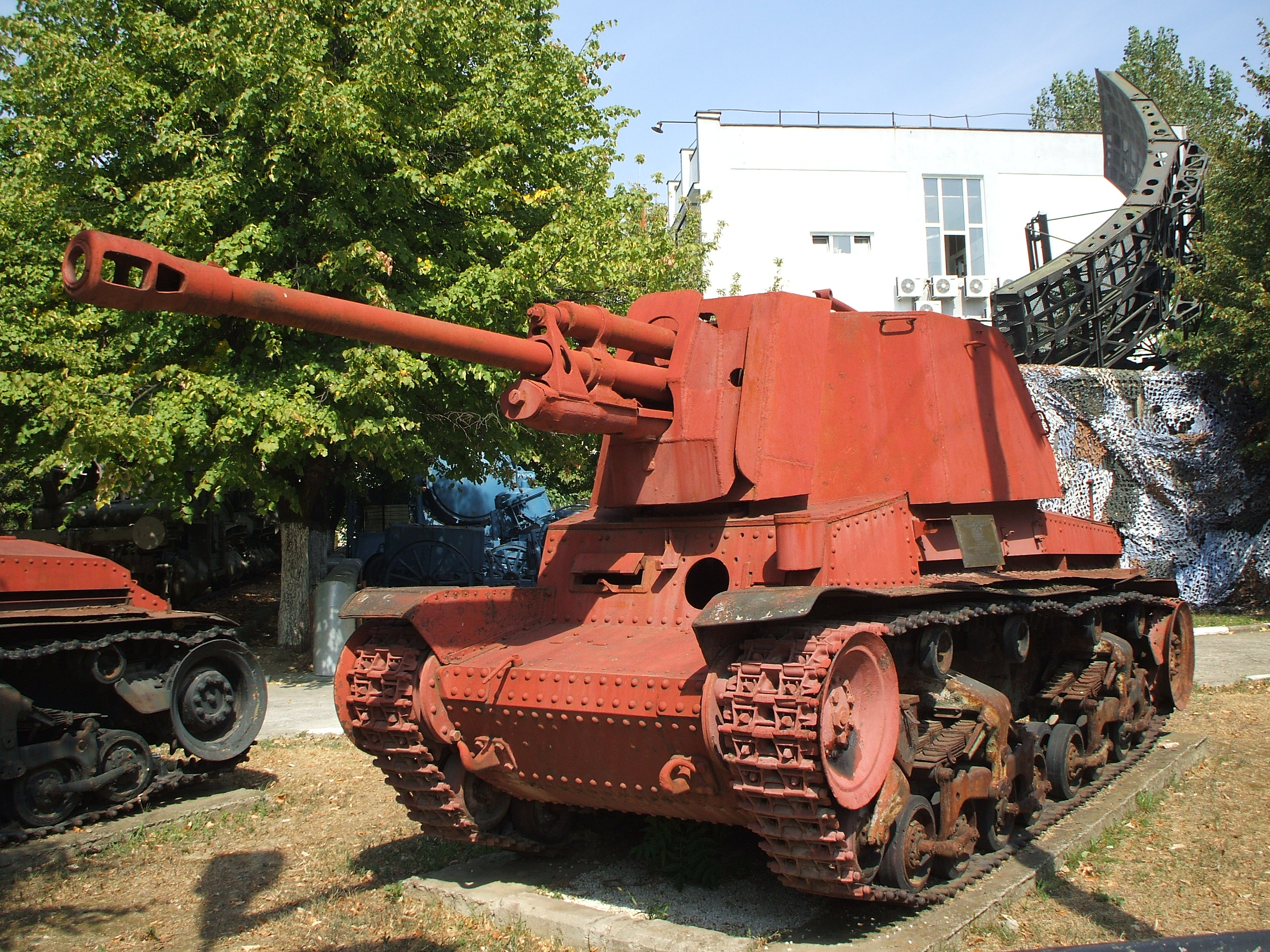
The Romanian TACAM R-2 tank destroyer which mounted a ZiS-3 gun.
