= 57 mm anti-tank gun M1943 (ZiS-2) =

57 mm anti-tank gun model 1943 (ZiS-2)
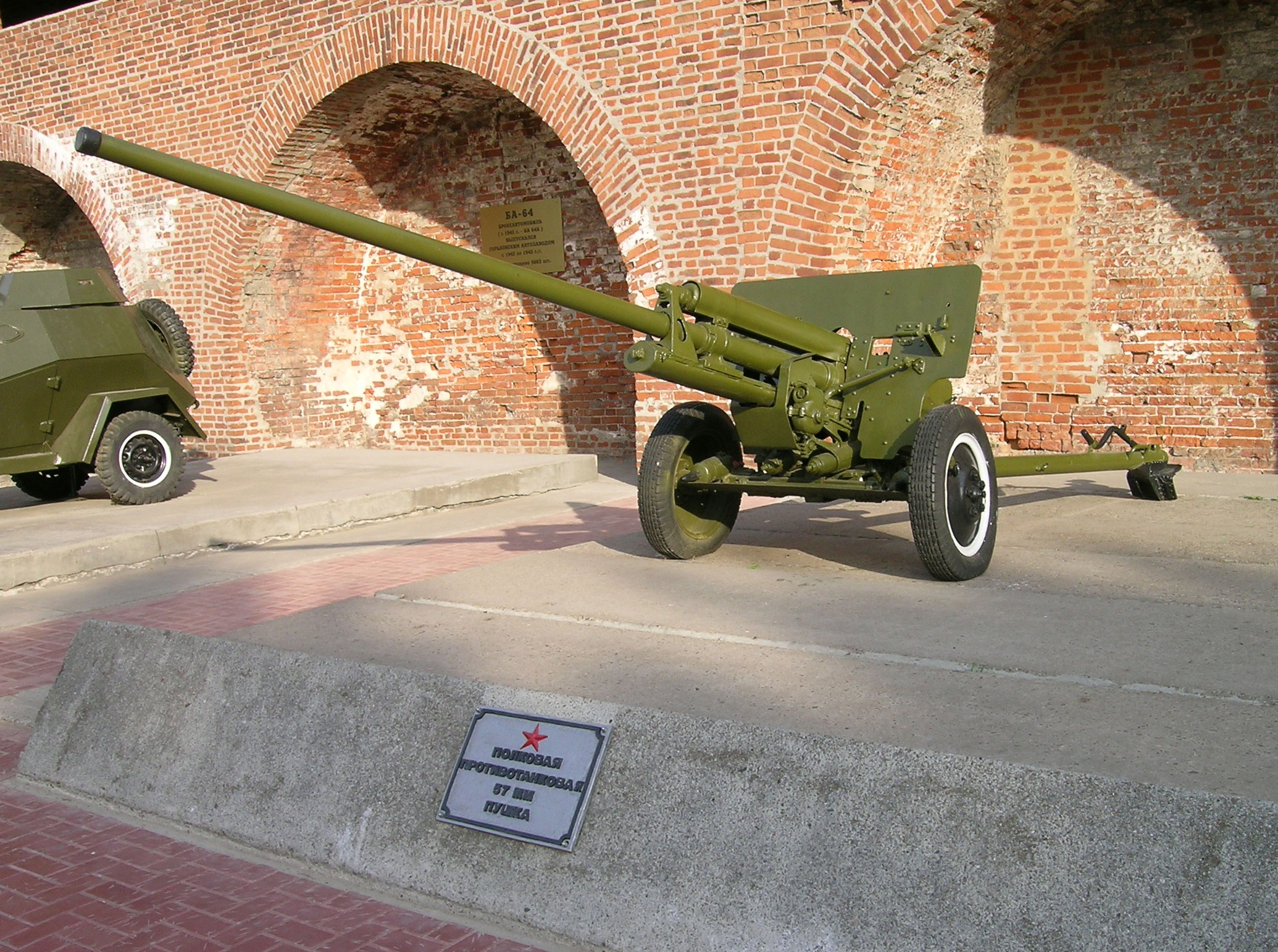
- ZiS-2 in the Kremlin of Nizhny Novgorod, Russia
- Type: Anti-tank gun
- Place of origin: Soviet Union

Service history
- Used by: See operators
- Wars: World War II; Vietnam War; Portuguese Colonial War; Lebanese Civil War; North Yemen Civil War; South African Border War

Production history
- Designer: design bureau of No. 92 Artillery Factory headed by V. G. Grabin
- Produced: 1941, 1943–1945
- No. built: 10,016

Specifications
- Mass: 1,250 kg (2,756 lb)
- Length: 7.03 m (23 ft 1 in)
- Barrel length: bore: 3.95 m (13 ft 0 in) L/69.3 overall: 4.16 m (13 ft 8 in) L/73
- Width: 1.7 m (5 ft 7 in)
- Height: 1.37 m (4 ft 6 in)
- Crew: 7
- Shell: Fixed QF 57×480 mmR (AP)
- Caliber: 57 mm (2.24 in)
- Breech: Semi-automatic vertical sliding-wedge
- Recoil: Hydro-pneumatic
- Carriage: Split trail
- Elevation: -5° to 25°
- Traverse: 56°
- Rate of fire: 25 rpm cyclic 10 rpm practical
- Muzzle velocity: 990 m/s (3,200 ft/s)
- Maximum firing range: 8.4 km (5.21 miles)

The ZiS-2 (Russian: ЗиС-2) (GRAU index: 52-P-271) is a Soviet 57 mm anti-tank gun used during World War II. The ZiS-4 is a version of the gun that was meant to be installed in tanks. ZiS stands for Zavod imeni Stalina (Russian Завод имени Сталина, 'Factory named after Stalin'), the official title of Artillery Factory No. 92, which produced the gun first.

== Development ==
In the beginning of 1940 the design office of V. G. Grabin received a task from the artillery department to develop a powerful anti-tank gun. The head of this department, Marshal Kulik, and his subordinates estimated that the use of heavily armoured tanks by the USSR in the Winter War would not have gone unnoticed in Nazi Germany and would lead to the development of similar fighting machines there. There is also a chance that the department was influenced by German propaganda about the experimental multi-turreted "supertank" NbFz, i.e. heavier armour was attributed to this vehicle than it actually carried. Therefore, Grabin and his office were guided by the characteristics of their own domestic heavy tank KV-1 with 40–75 mm armour. In the opinion of the designers the optimal calibre in this case was 57 mm. The velocity and mass of the armour-piercing 57 mm projectile allowed it to attain sufficient kinetic energy to penetrate up to 90 mm of RHA while keeping the gun sufficiently light, mobile and easy to conceal. However, the decision also had a downside: this calibre was a new one to the Red Army so the manufacturing of the projectile had to be started from scratch.

Development started in May 1940, and in the beginning of 1941 the gun was adopted as the 57 mm anti-tank gun model 1941 (Russian: 57-мм противотанковая пушка образца 1941 года), abbreviated ZiS-2 (ЗиС-2). Production began on 1 June 1941, but on 1 December 1941 it was stopped by marshals N. N. Voronov and G. L. Govorov, their explanation being that ZiS-2 shells penetrated straight through weakly-armoured German tanks from one side to the other without doing much damage internally. Other possible reasons for the decision were the high cost of the gun and problems with shell production. By that time 371 pieces had been built.

The production lines were switched to manufacturing of the ZiS-3 76.2 mm divisional gun while Soviet anti-tank artillery received cheaper 45 mm guns. Some anti-tank regiments also received the ZiS-3 which was able to defeat any German vehicle until late 1942.

The appearance of the heavy Tiger I and then the Panther changed the balance in favour of the Germans. Forty-five millimetre model 1942 guns could only pierce the side armour of the Panther while the ZiS-3 managed to penetrate the sides from greater distances. Against the Tiger the ZiS-3 was effective from the side only at close ranges (up to 300 m) and the 45 mm pieces were nearly useless. A more powerful gun was needed, and on 15 June 1943, the ZiS-2 once again entered service as the 57 mm anti-tank gun model 1943. Until 1945, 9,645 units were produced.

== Description ==
The ZiS-2 is an automated-action gun with a vertical block breech. When firing the block opens and closes automatically, the loader only has to put a round into the receiver. Due to this feature the rate of fire can reach 25 rounds per minute. The split-trail carriage with gunshield was shared with the ZiS-3 divisional gun. The carriage has coil spring suspension, which allows towing with a speed of up to 50 km/h (31 mph) on highways, 30 km/h (19 mph) on unpaved roads and 10 km/h (6.2 mph) off-road. The gun can also be attached to a limber and towed by a team of six horses. ZiS-2s are equipped with PP1–2 panoramic sights.

== Service ==
ZiS-2s were employed by anti-tank artillery platoons of infantry units and by anti-tank artillery units of the reserve of high command, the most numerous of these being anti-tank artillery regiments (Russian Истребительный Противотанковый Артиллерийский Полк, abbreviated ИПТАП). Guns captured by the Germans were given the designation 5.7 cm Pak 208(r).

=== Self-propelled mounts ===
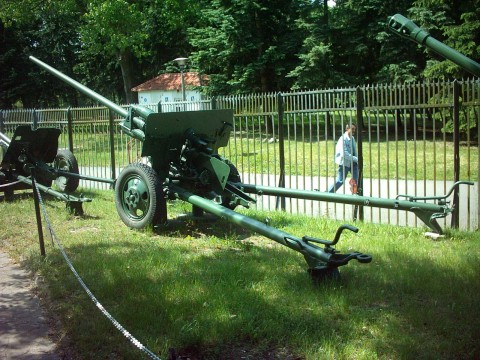
ZIS-2 model 1943 in Poznań Citadel, Poland

The ZiS-2 was also mounted on a few vehicles. In 1941 about one-hundred ZiS-2 guns were mounted on Komsomolets armoured tractor chassis to create the ZiS-30 tank destroyer.

The ZiS-2 gun was also mounted in at least three different prototypes based on the SU-76 assault gun (SU-74, SU-76D, and SU-57B). None were accepted for production.

There was also a tank gun version of ZiS-2 called ZiS-4. In 1941, in an attempt to improve the anti-tank performance of the T-34 tank members of the Morozov Design Bureau experimentally equipped it with the ZiS-4. Only a small number of these T-34-57 tanks were built and used as tank hunters. The idea resurfaced in 1943 after the Battle of Kursk because Germany fielded heavily armoured Tiger and Panther tanks. Only a limited number of the T-34 equipped with a slightly modified version of the ZiS-4M gun with a new breech to simplify production were produced. Although the high-velocity gun had superior armour penetration to the F-34 the small weight of its shell meant that it could not fire an adequate high-explosive round for general use. The ultimate solution for the tank was to design a new turret allowing the use of an 85 mm gun; the new model was called the T-34-85.

A modernised version of the ZiS-2 was used in a post-war self-propelled airborne antitank gun known as the ASU-57.

=== Post-war history ===
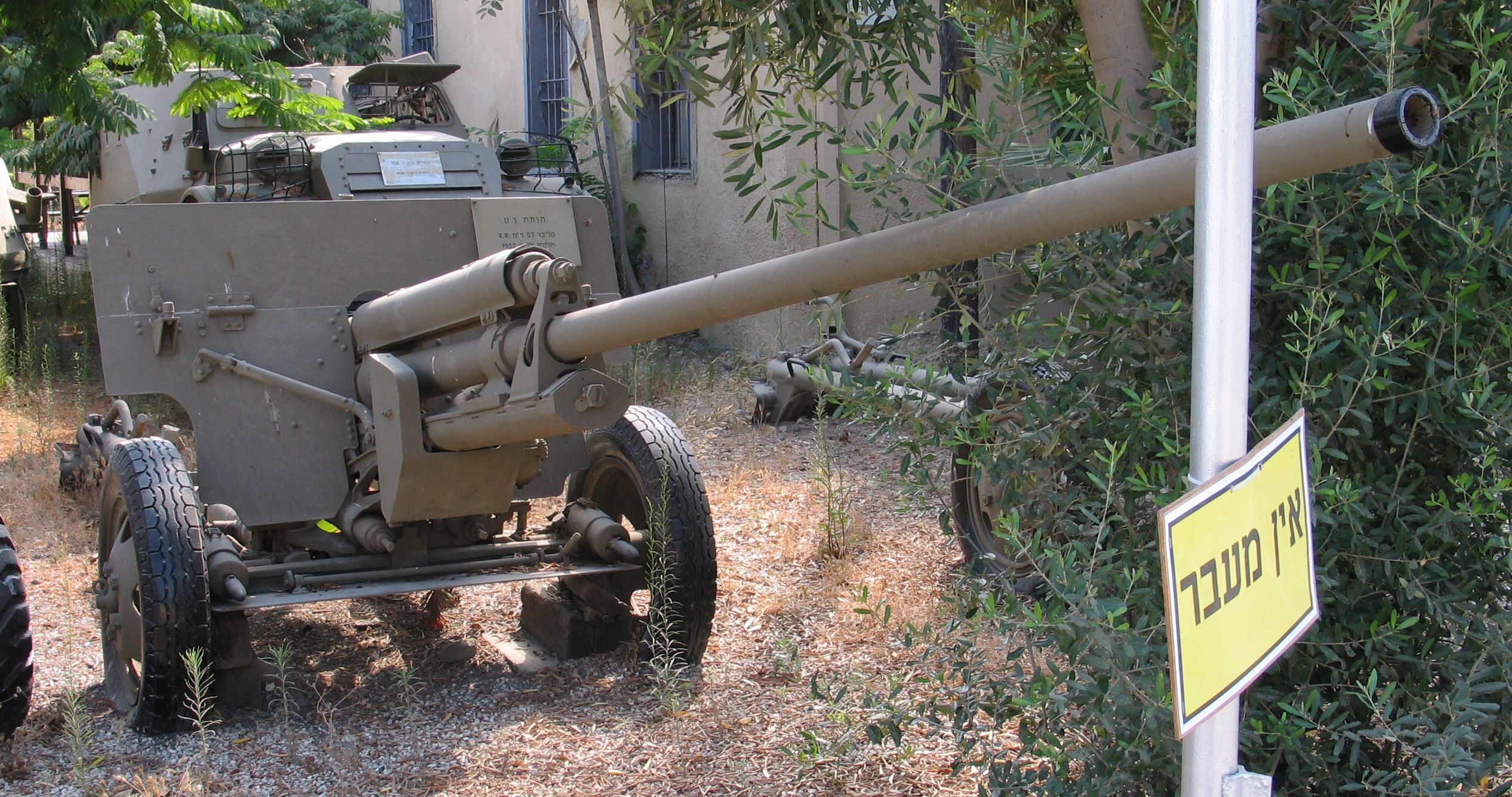
Captured ZiS-2, Israel Defense Forces History Museum.

Due to improvements in tank armour protection the ZiS-2 quickly lost its anti-tank value. In Soviet anti-tank artillery forces by the mid-1950s, the ZiS-2 was replaced by a more powerful 100 mm gun. However, its small size and weight kept it in active service with Soviet airborne troops for much longer.

Following the poor performance of the B-10 recoilless gun in the hands of Arab armies during the Six-Day War, some Soviet battalions reportedly replaced their B-10 and B-11s with ZiS-2s kept in reserve as a stopgap measure until the arrival of the SPG-9 in 1969.

On 15 July 2013 a North Korean cargo ship, the Chong Chon Gang, was intercepted smuggling weapons from Cuba while transiting the Panama Canal. Following a board-and-search operation by Panamanian security forces, it was discovered to be carrying ZiS-2 ammunition among other older Soviet-made weaponry, indicating that some examples remain in continuing use by North Korean forces. Until this incident, Namibia was believed to be the last operator of the ZiS-2; the Namibian Defence Force having continued to operate six examples well into the 1990s. Although no longer in active service, ZiS-2s remained in storage as part of the reserve stocks of various national armies as late as 2008.

== Versions ==
- ZiS-2 – Basic version.
- ZiS-4 – Tank gun version.

== Ammunition ==
Available ammunition
Type	Model	Weight	HE filling, g
Armour-piercing projectiles (muzzle velocity up to 990 m/s)
APHE	BR-271K	3.14 kg (6.9 lb)	18
APCBC	BR-271	3.14 kg (6.9 lb)	14
APCBC (improved penetration)	BR-271M	2.80 kg (6.2 lb)	13
AP (solid)	BR-271SP	3.14 kg (6.9 lb)	none
Composite Armour-piercing projectiles (muzzle velocity up to 1,250 m/s)
APCR "reel" type	BR-271P	1.79 kg (3.9 lb)	none
APCR "smooth" type	BR-271N	2.4 kg (5.3 lb)	N/A
Other projectiles (muzzle velocity up to 700 m/s)
Fragmentation	O-271U (O-271G)	3.75 kg (8.3 lb)	204 or 220
Canister	Shch-271	3.66 kg (8.1 lb)	none

Armour penetration

APHE projectile BR-271K
Distance, m	Meet angle 60°, mm	Meet angle 90°, mm
100	91	112
300	84	103
500	76	94
1,000	60	74
1,500	46	57
2,000	35	44
APCBC projectile BR-271
Distance, m	Meet angle 60°, mm	Meet angle 90°, mm
100	93	114
300	89	109
500	84	103
1,000	74	91
1,500	64	79
2,000	56	69
APCR projectile BR-271P
Distance, m	Meet angle 60°, mm	Meet angle 90°, mm
100	155	190
300	137	168
500	120	147
1,000	83	101
These data was obtained by Soviet methods of armour penetration measurement (penetration probability equals 75%). They are not directly comparable with Western data of similar type

=== Weapons of comparable role, performance and era ===
- Ordnance QF 6-pounder: British anti-tank gun
- Bofors 57 mm: Swedish anti-tank gun
- 5 cm Pak 38 : German anti-tank gun

== Operators ==
- Albania
- Bulgaria
- China
- Congo
- Cuba
- Czechoslovakia
- Egypt
- East Germany
- Hungary
- North Korea
- Poland
- Romania
- Soviet Union
- Yugoslavia

== See also ==
- 76 mm divisional gun M1942 (ZiS-3)
