= Nizhny Novgorod Machine-building Plant =

Coordinates: 56°19′34″N 43°53′49″E

NMZ
- Type: Open joint-stock company
- Founded: 1932
- Headquarters: Nizhny Novgorod, Russia
- Key people: Vasily Shupranov (General Director, since October 2011)
- Products: Armament (weapons and ammunition), artillery, howitzers, anti-tank guns, oil and gas fittings
- Revenue: $17 million (2017)
- Operating income: $22.8 million (2017)
- Net income: $359,753 (2017)
- Total assets: $445 million (2017)
- Total equity: −$38.8 million (2017)
- Parent: Almaz-Antey
- Website: Official site of JSC NMZ

Open joint-stock company (JSC) NMZ or Nizhny Novgorod Machine-building Plant (Russian: Нижегородский машиностроительный завод) is a Russian (formerly Soviet) artillery factory in the Sormovo district of Gorky. It included the TsAKB artillery design bureau led by Vasiliy Grabin.

Currently, it is part of Almaz-Antey together with Almaz-Antey Branch no. 1.

== Names ==
Previous names for this factory include Gorky Machine-building Plant (Russian: Горьковский машиностроительный завод), All-Union Machine-building Plant New Sormovo (Russian: Союзный машиностроительный завод «Новое Сормово», Novoje Sormovo), Joseph Stalin Factory No. 92, Artillery Factory No. 92, Zavod imeni Stalina, or ZiS.

== Products ==
Its products included:

- ZiS-2 57mm antitank gun
- ZiS-3 76.2mm divisional gun
- ZiS-5 76.2mm tank gun (version of the F-34 tank gun)
- ZiS-30 self-propelled antitank gun
- ZiS-S-53 85mm tank gun

=== Current products ===
- Ship-based nuclear power plant for Navy (including surface ships and submarine)
  In 2006 Rosenergoatom and Sevmash signed a contract for the floating nuclear power plant. NMZ produced the nuclear power plants KLT-40S for it.
- Surface-to-air missile systems, anti-aircraft weapons, anti-ballistic missile systems and radars
- Artillery
- NMZ Production, a team who makes short films.

== Main shareholders ==
- JSC Concern VKO "Almaz-Antey" — 51% of shares
- Open Joint Stock Company Head System Design Bureau of the "Almaz-Antey" Air Defense Concern — 35,12% of shares
