= Vasiliy Grabin =

Soviet artillery designer (1900–1980)

Vasiliy Gavrilovich Grabin
- Василий Гаврилович Грабин
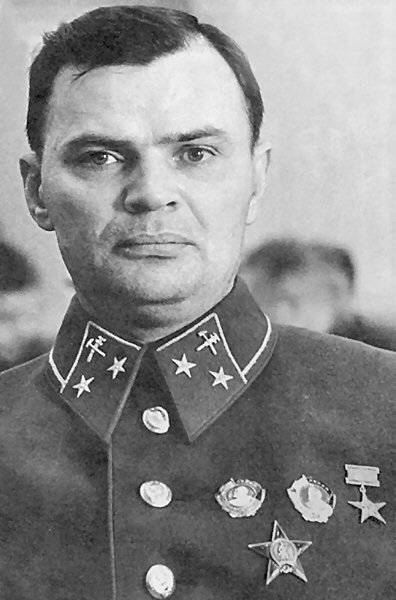
- Born: 9 January 1900 [O.S. 28 December 1899]
- Died: 18 April 1980 (aged 80); Korolyov, Moscow Oblast, Soviet Union
- Occupation: Artillery designer
- Known for: Designing the 76 mm divisional gun M1942 (ZiS-3)

Vasiliy Gavrilovich Grabin (Russian: Василий Гаврилович Грабин; 9 January 1900 [O.S. 28 December 1899] – 18 April 1980) was a Soviet artillery designer. He led a design bureau (TsAKB) at Joseph Stalin Factory No. 92 in Gorky (Nizhny Novgorod).

Grabin was chief designer of ZiS-3, the 76.2 mm (3.00 in) divisional field gun, which was the most numerous cannon of World War II (over 103,000 cannons were built).

Grabin was the first artillery designer to use ergonomics in cannon construction (before the word ergonomics even appeared). In the 1930s he used physiologist consultations to optimize the design of cannons.

Grabin received numerous awards, including Hero of Socialist Labour, the Order of Lenin (four times), the Order of the October Revolution, the Order of the Red Banner, the Order of the Red Star, and others. He was a four-time recipient of the Stalin Prize first degree for outstanding inventions.

He is buried in Novodevichy Cemetery in Moscow.
