= Vickers Model 1931 =

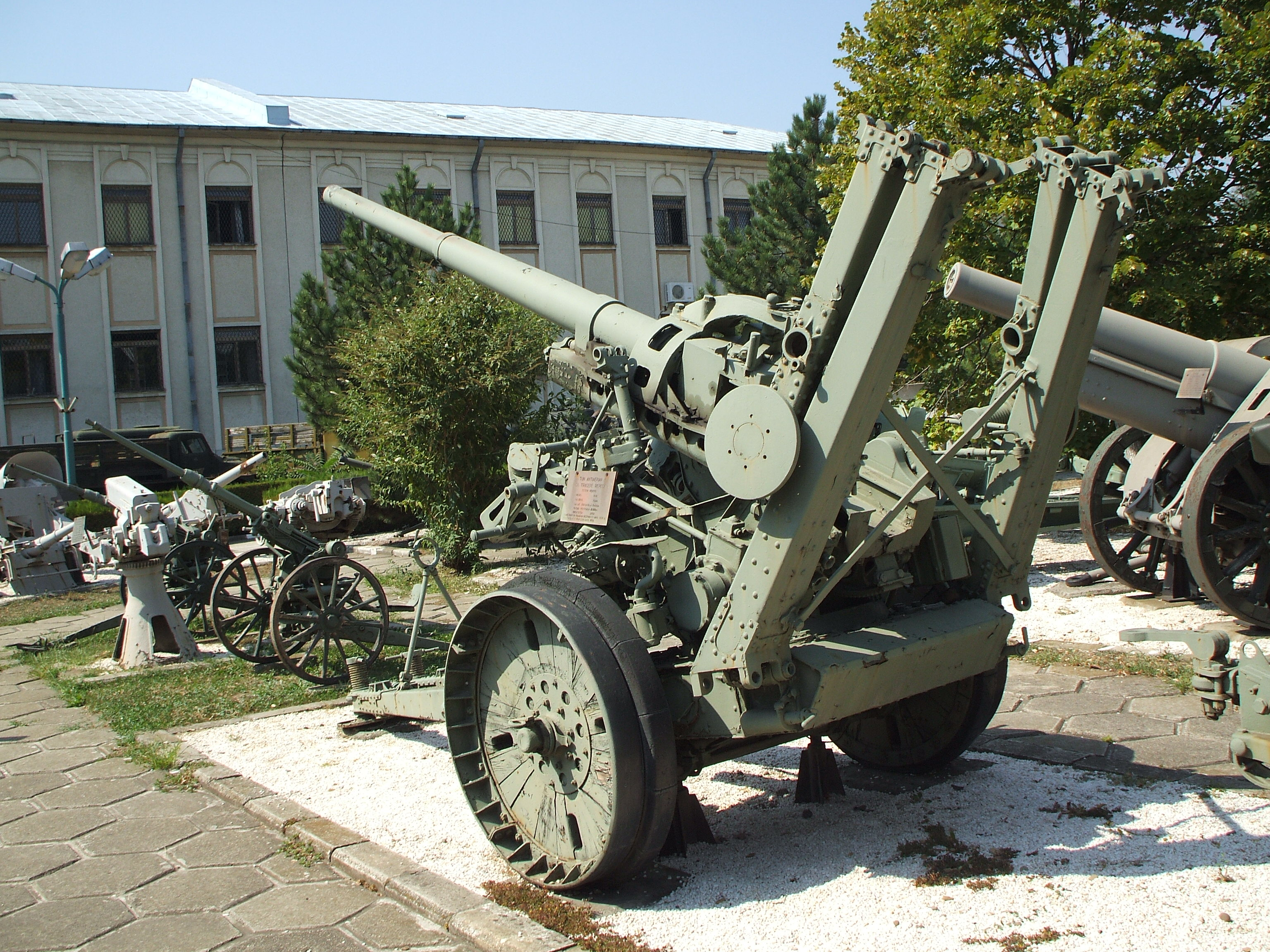
- Romanian-produced 75mm Vickers anti-aircraft gun model 1936/39 displayed in "King Ferdinand" National Military Museum, Bucharest
- Type: Anti-aircraft gun
- Place of origin: United Kingdom

Service history
- In service: 1937–1950s
- Used by: List of operators: Belgium; China; Denmark; Finland; Nazi Germany; Lithuania; Netherlands; Portugal; Romania; Soviet Union; Switzerland; Turkey; United Kingdom
- Wars: World War II

Production history
- Designer: Vickers
- Designed: ~ 1931
- Manufacturer: Vickers; Reșița
- Developed into: 75 mm Reșița Model 1943 (Using rifling and cartridge chamber)
- Produced: 1931–1944
- Variants: See § Variants

Specifications
- Mass: 2,825 kg (6,228 lb)
- Barrel length: Depend on user: Danish guns: Overall: 3.652 m (12 ft 0 in) L/48.7; Bore: 3.375 m (11 ft 1 in) L/45; Dutch guns: Overall: 3.225 m (10 ft 7 in) L/43; Bore: 3 m (9 ft 10 in) L/40; Finnish guns: Overall: 3.429 m (11 ft 3 in) L/45; Bore: 2.98 m (9 ft 9 in) L/39.1; Romanian guns: Overall: 3.375 m (11 ft 1 in) L/45; Bore: 3.225 m (10 ft 7 in) L/43
- Shell: Most users: 75×495mmR; Romania: 75×561mmR; Finland: 76.2×505mmR
- Shell weight: 6.5 kg (14 lb 5 oz) (HE)
- Calibre: 75 mm (3 in)
- Action: Semi-automatic
- Carriage: Cruciform
- Elevation: 0° to +90°
- Traverse: 360°
- Rate of fire: 12 rpm
- Muzzle velocity: 750 m/s (2,500 ft/s)
- Effective firing range: 5 km (3.1 mi) slant range
- Maximum firing range: 10 km (33,000 ft) ceiling

The Vickers Model 1931 was a British anti-aircraft gun used during the Second World War. The design was rejected by the British and Vickers exported the gun worldwide during the 1930s.

== Design ==
The cruciform carriage had two pneumatic or solid rubber wheels that were removable. Two legs locked together for transport and the barrel was secured to them. The other two legs folded in half and were elevated almost vertically into the air. (Note: See the Romanian reference to see exactly how it looked.)

== Operational history ==
=== Romania ===
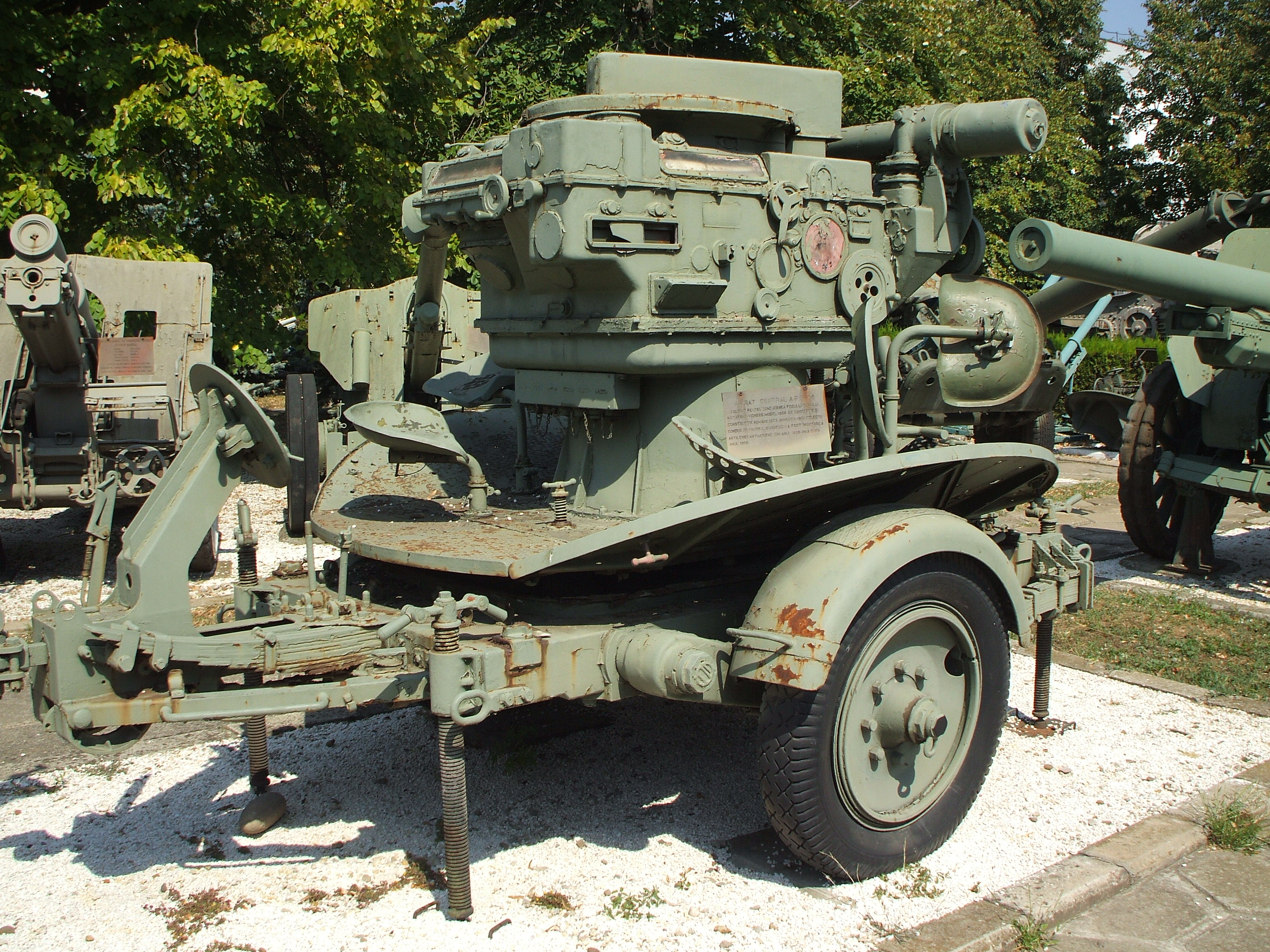
Bungescu M1938 Fire-control system, used for the Romanian-made guns

Romania bought a license for 100 in 1936, although hundreds more were built during the war. The second batch of 100 pieces was started in July 1941, the production rate being of 5 pieces per month as of October 1942.

=== Finland ===
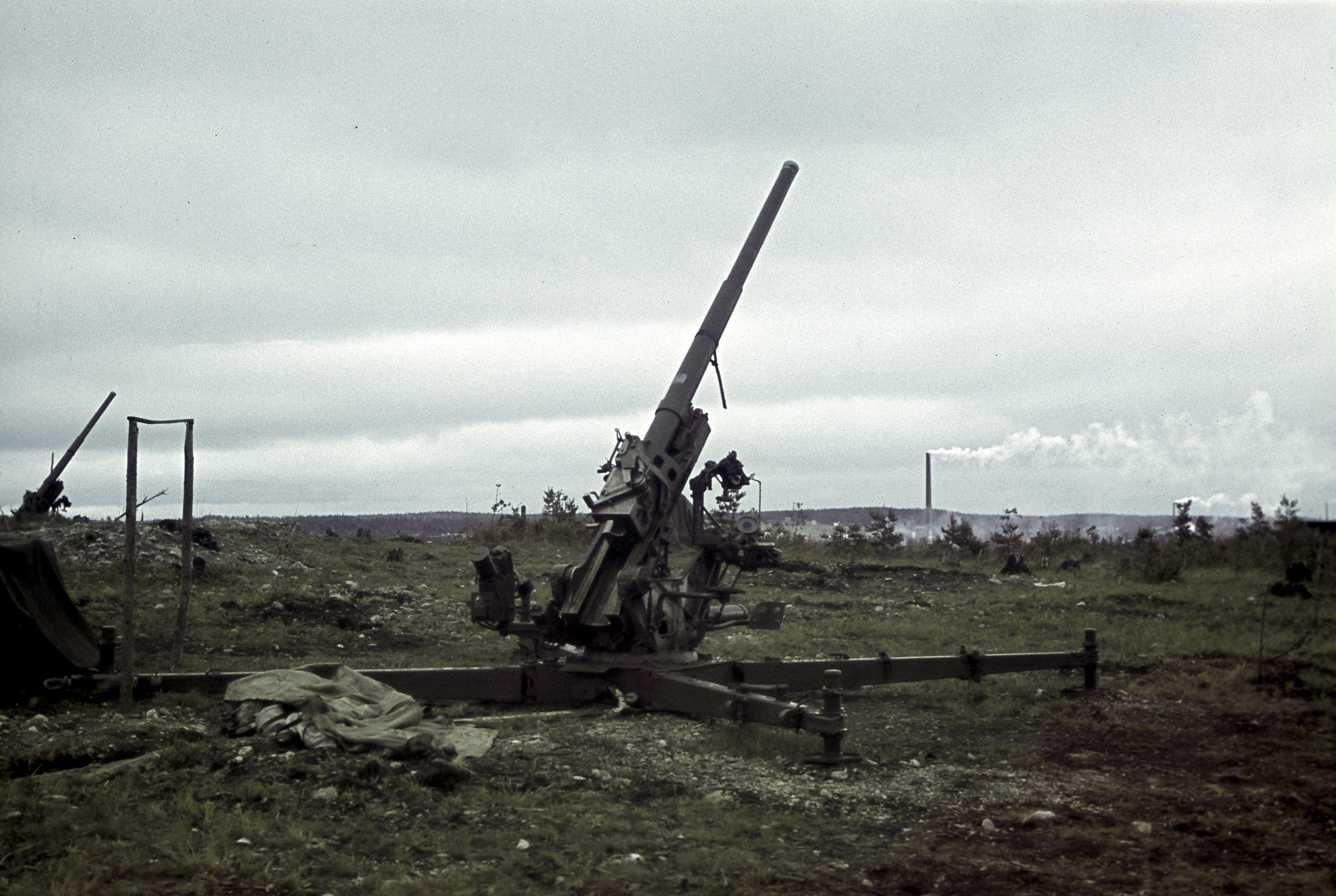
Finnish 76 ItK/34 V

Finland bought a dozen to help reduce balance of payment problems with the British in 1936. The Finnish guns, designated 76mm ItK/34 V, were chambered in their standard 76.2 mm (3 in) caliber.

=== Others ===
Denmark also bought a license, designating it as 75 mm lange luftværnskanon model 1932. Belgium, the Netherlands, Lithuania, Turkey, Switzerland and China bought numbers of guns directly from Vickers.

During World War II, those weapons captured after the German conquest of Europe were taken into Wehrmacht service as the 7.5 cm Flak M.35 (b) (Beligian guns), 7.5 cm Flak M.35 (d) (Danish guns) or 7.5 cm Flak M.35 (h) (Dutch guns). Similarly the Soviet Union used those guns it captured from Lithuania after the occupation of the Baltic states in 1940. Supposedly it saw limited British service with Home Defense "barrage units" in 1940 – 1943.

== Variants ==
=== Romanian 88 mm anti-tank variant ===
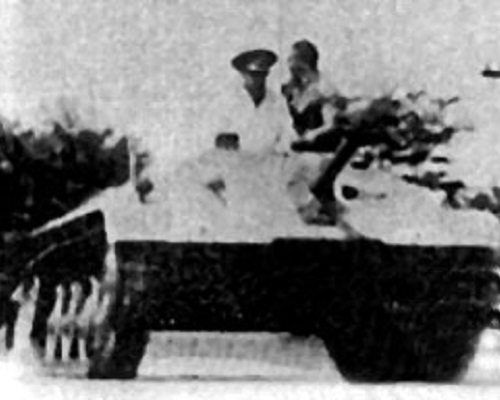
Romanian Mareșal M-05 tank destroyer during trials. It used the Romanian 75 mm Reșița Model 1943 anti-tank gun, which incorporated features of the 75 mm Vickers. The Mareșal was also proposed to be equipped with another Romanian 88 mm anti-tank gun, based on the 75 mm Vickers.

In 1944, Romania developed an anti-tank adaptation of the 75 mm Vickers M1931. A January 1944 report by Colonel Radu Davidescu mentions how the "75 mm Vickers anti-aircraft gun, adapted as an anti-tank gun" was proposed to be mounted on the Mareșal tank destroyer. A later report from June 1944 describes how this anti-tank gun adaptation of the 75 mm Vickers was materialized, and its caliber was increased to 88 mm. During trials, this new Romanian 88 mm anti-tank gun was compared to a German 88 mm Flak gun. The Romanian gun performed better in terms of rounds per minute (25 compared to 20 of the German gun), combat weight (4,5 t compared to 7,5 t of the German gun) and traveling weight (4,5 t compared to 5 t of the German gun). In other aspects, the two guns were similar. The new 88 mm gun was also proposed to be mounted on the R-2 light tank chassis (see TACAM R-2). Only four examples are known to have been produced in the short time that remained before Romania was overrun by Soviet forces.

== See also ==
75 mm Reșița Model 1943 — AT gun using major elements of the: 75 mm Vickers/Reșița Model 1936 (Vickers Model 31)

== Bibliography ==
- Axworthy, Mark; Scafes, Cornel; Craciunoiu, Cristian (1995). Third Axis, Fourth Ally: Romanian Armed Forces in the European War, 1941-1945. London: Arms and Armour. ISBN 1-85409-267-7.
- Gander, Terry; Chamberlain, Peter (1979). Weapons of the Third Reich: An Encyclopedic Survey of All Small Arms, Artillery and Special Weapons of the German Land Forces 1939-1945. New York: Doubleday. ISBN 0-385-15090-3.
- Gheorghe, Viorel (2020). "Încercări de dezvoltare a tehnicii militare românești în anii celui de-al Doilea Război Mondial" [Attempts of Developing Romanian Military Technology During the Years of the Second World War] (PDF). Buletinul Arhivelor Militare Române [Journal of the Romanian Military Archives] (in Romanian). 2 (88): 71–79. ISSN 1454-0924.
- Stănescu, Manuel (2012). "Un proiect românesc ambițios – vânătorul de care "Mareşal"" [An Ambitious Romanian Project – the Mareșal Tank Destroyer] (PDF). Buletinul Arhivelor Militare Române [Journal of the Romanian Military Archives] (in Romanian). 4 (58): 54–60. ISSN 1454-0924.
