= 75 mm Reșița Model 1943 =

Reșița 75 mm anti-tank gun
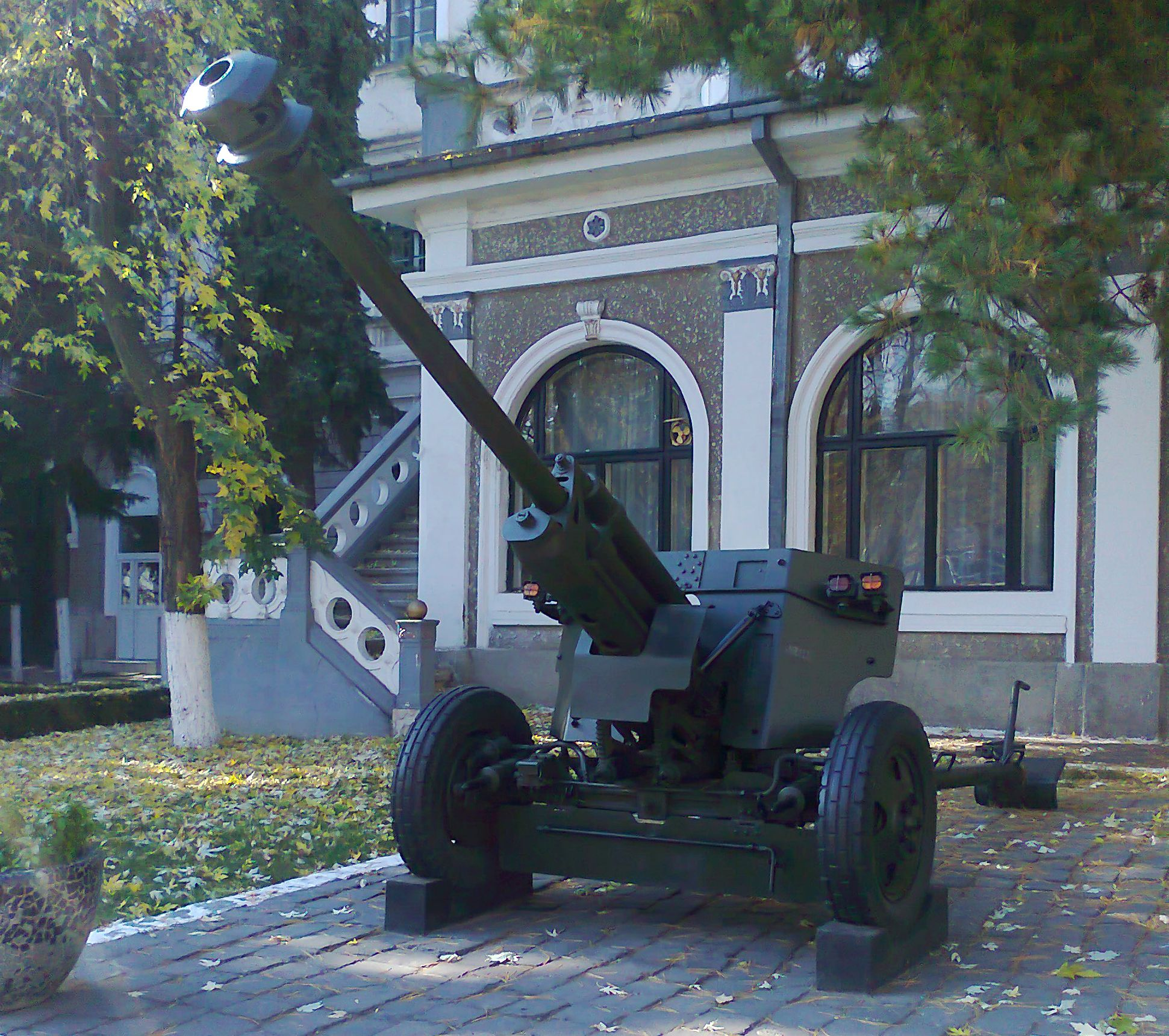
- DT-UDR 26 displayed in Timișoara
- Type: anti-tank gun/field gun
- Place of origin: Romania

Service history
- In service: 1944—45?
- Used by: Romania
- Wars: World War II

Production history
- Designed: 1942—43
- Manufacturer: Uzinele și Domeniile Reșița, Astra, Concordia
- Produced: 1944—45?
- No. built: 372+

Specifications (data from:)
- Mass: 1,430 kilograms (3,150 lb)
- Length: 5.45 metres (17.9 ft)
- Barrel length: 3.625 metres (142.7 in) (rifling) L/48
- Width: 1.82 metres (6.0 ft)
- Height: 1.55 metres (5.1 ft)
- Crew: 7
- Shell: Fixed QF 75×561mm R
- Shell weight: 6.6 kilograms (15 lb) (AP)
- Caliber: 75 millimetres (3.0 in)
- Breech: Vertical sliding-block
- Carriage: Split trail
- Elevation: -7° to +35°
- Traverse: 70°
- Rate of fire: up to 20 rounds per minute
- Muzzle velocity: 1,030 metres per second (3,400 ft/s)
- Maximum firing range: 12,000 metres (13,000 yd) (HE)

The 75 mm Reșița Model 1943 was an anti-tank gun produced by Romania during World War II. It combined features from the Soviet ZiS-3 field/anti-tank gun, the German PaK 40 and the Romanian 75 mm Vickers/Reșița Model 1936 anti-aircraft gun. It saw service against both the Soviets during the Jassy-Kishniev Offensive and against the Germans during the Budapest Offensive and subsequent operations to clear Austria and Czechoslovakia.

According to British historian Mark Axworthy, the gun could be considered the most versatile of its class developed during World War II, outperforming Soviet, German and Western counterparts.

== Development ==
Development began in 1942 of a dual-purpose field and anti-tank gun that could be built in Romania to replace the collection of obsolescent field guns currently used and upgrade their anti-tank defenses of the army. To speed development Colonel Valerian Nestorescu suggested combining the best features from the 75 mm (3.0 in) guns already in service in Romania, Germany or captured from the Soviets. Colonel Nestorescu was selected to produce a prototype to be built at the Uzinele și Domeniile Reșița in Reșița. Three prototypes were built combining various features and trialled against a Reşiţa-built copy of the ZiS-3, the Pak 40 and the Schneider–Putilov Model 1902/36 field gun in September 1943 and the third prototype had the greatest armor penetration. It was adopted as the Tunul antitanc DT-UDR 26, cal. 75 mm, md. 1943, commonly shortened to 75 mm Reşiţa Model 1943.

== Description ==
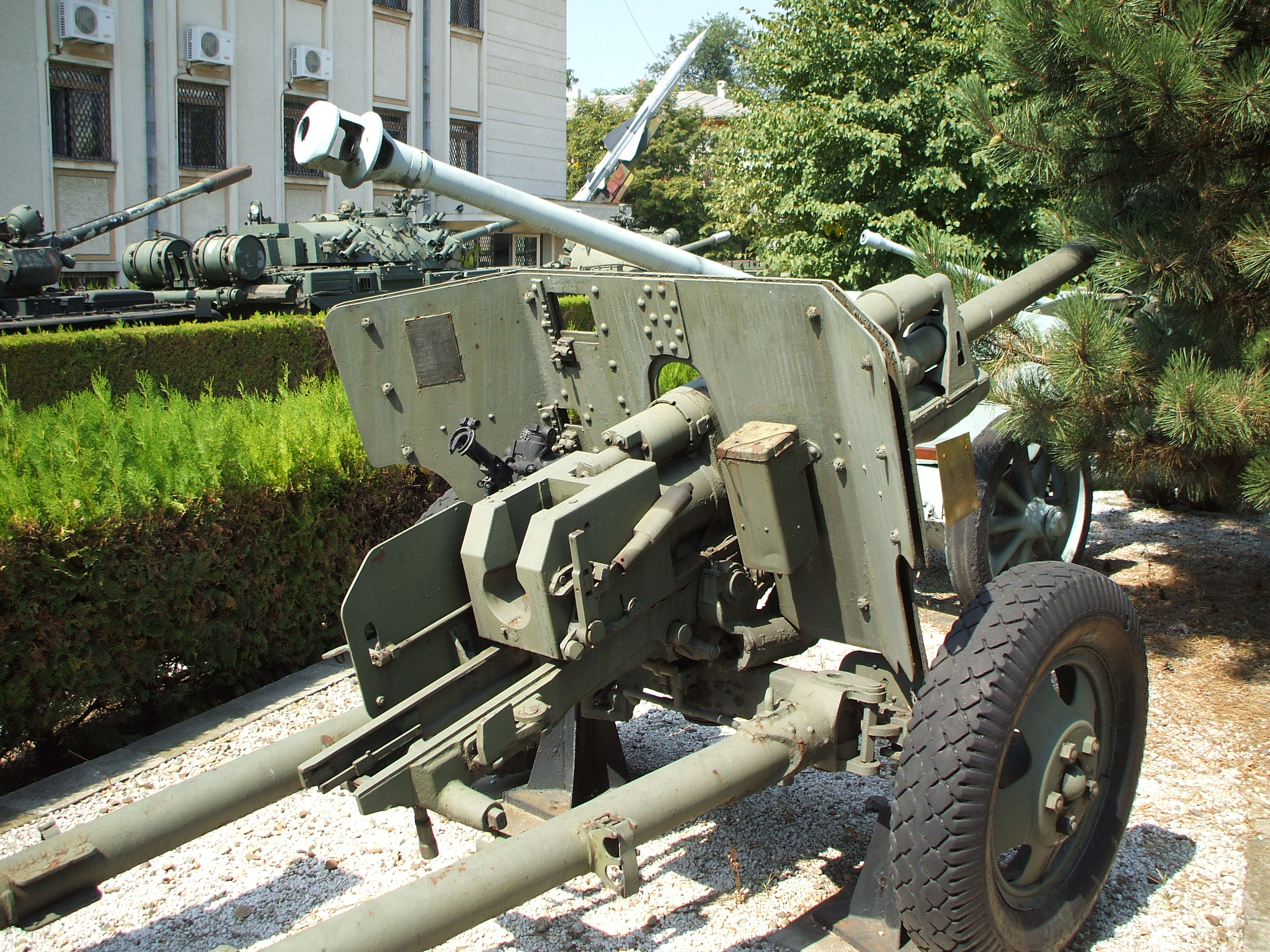
Rear view of an example at the National Military Museum, Bucharest

The gun combined the muzzle brake, recoil and firing mechanisms and split-trail carriage of the ZiS-3, the barrel, rifling and cartridge chamber of the Vickers/Reşiţa Model 1936 anti-aircraft gun and the projectile chamber of the Pak 40. It had a gun shield that consisted of two 6 millimetres (0.24 in) plates separated by a 20 millimetres (0.79 in) gap. It had only 680 parts, almost as few as the 610 of the ZiS-3, but far fewer than the 1200 of the Pak 40. It had a higher muzzle velocity and thus greater penetrative power than the Pak 40. It therefore combined virtues of both the ZiS-3 and Pak 40. 1100 guns were ordered on 10 December 1943 from Uzinele și Domeniile Reșița, Astra in Brașov and Concordia in Ploiești.

The 75 mm Reșița Model 1943 fired a 6.6 kg (15 lb) armor-piercing shell at 1,030 metres per second (3,400 ft/s). Penetration tests consisted of eight armored shields with a thickness of 10 cm placed as follows: the first four were 300 meters (arranged at an angle of 30º), the other three at 500 meters (same angle) and the last one at 1000 meters (in position The engineer captain Eugen Burlacu was in charge of the firing with the "b" variant of the second prototype. These were nine (the first shot on the shield at 1000 meters did not reach the target) and they lasted a total of one minute and twenty seconds. The performance of the cannon was as follows: complete destruction of the first four shields at 300 meters, complete penetration of the three at 500 meters and penetrating the one at 1000 meters. However, this high muzzle velocity came at the cost of a very short barrel life, only 500 rounds, compared to the 6000 of a Pak 40. Its ammunition combined features of shells used by the Pak 40 and the Vickers/Reșița Model 1936 anti-aircraft gun, although this raises the issue of exactly how the Reșița Model 1943 achieved such velocities. The Pak 40 had a muzzle velocity of 990 m/s (3,200 ft/s) when firing the light-weight, tungsten-cored Pzgr 40 shell, but the only data for the Reșița give a shell weight of 6.6 kg (15 lb), which is roughly equivalent to the Pak 40's full-sized 6.8 kg (15 lb) Pzgr 39 shell that was fired at a mere 792 metres per second (2,600 ft/s). Unfortunately detailed specifications for the Reșița's ammunition haven't been discovered so that question will have to remain unanswered.The figure most likely refers to the APCR round.

The 75 mm Reșița Model 1943 had a maximum elevation angle of 35 degrees, which allowed it to also be employed as a field gun. This was almost as much as the 37 degrees of the Soviet ZiS-3, a dedicated field gun, and significantly more than the 22 degrees of the German Pak-40 anti-tank gun. It could also depress slightly more than both (-7 degrees compared to -5 degrees of the other two guns). This made the Romanian gun arguably the most versatile in its class during World War II, outperforming its Western, German and Soviet equivalents.

== Operational use ==
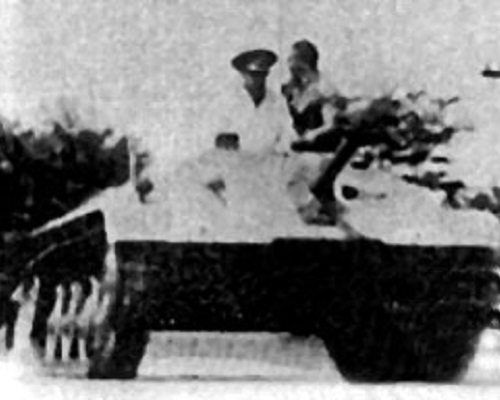
The Mareșal tank destroyer used the 75 mm Reșița Model 1943

The first twenty-four guns were issued to the 1st Armored Division in the spring of 1944 and later two independent anti-tank regiments with thirty-six guns apiece formed from the artillery regiments of the disbanded Frontier Division. Most of the cavalry and infantry divisions began to receive some guns during the summer of 1944. A total of 372 pieces were produced by early December 1944: 210 at the Reșița works, 120 at the Astra Works in Brașov, and 42 at the Concordia Works in Ploiești. However, the gun displayed in Oradea has serial number 394, thus the production run was likely larger. Despite the losses suffered during the Soviet Jassy-Kishniev Offensive of August 1944 most divisions at the front in February 1945 had between six and twelve 75 mm Reșița Model 1943 on hand. After the war, the gun was relegated to secondary roles, such as training, because it had a western caliber. The 75 mm Reșița Model 1943 was used until 1998, when it was phased out.

The gun was also used on the last three prototypes and the serial production vehicles of the Mareșal tank destroyer.

An almost complete example, lacking optical sights, is displayed at the Romanian National Military Museum in Bucharest. Eight more are displayed in various places around the country – two each in Liberty Square in Timișoara and at the Military Museum in Iași, one on the sidewalk in front of the Military Museum in Oradea, one in the Dej Military Museum, one at the Artillery School in Sibiu and one at the Military Museum in Constanța.
