= National Military Museum, Romania =

Museum in Bucharest, Romania

King Ferdinand I National Military Museum
- Muzeul Militar Național "Regele Ferdinand I"
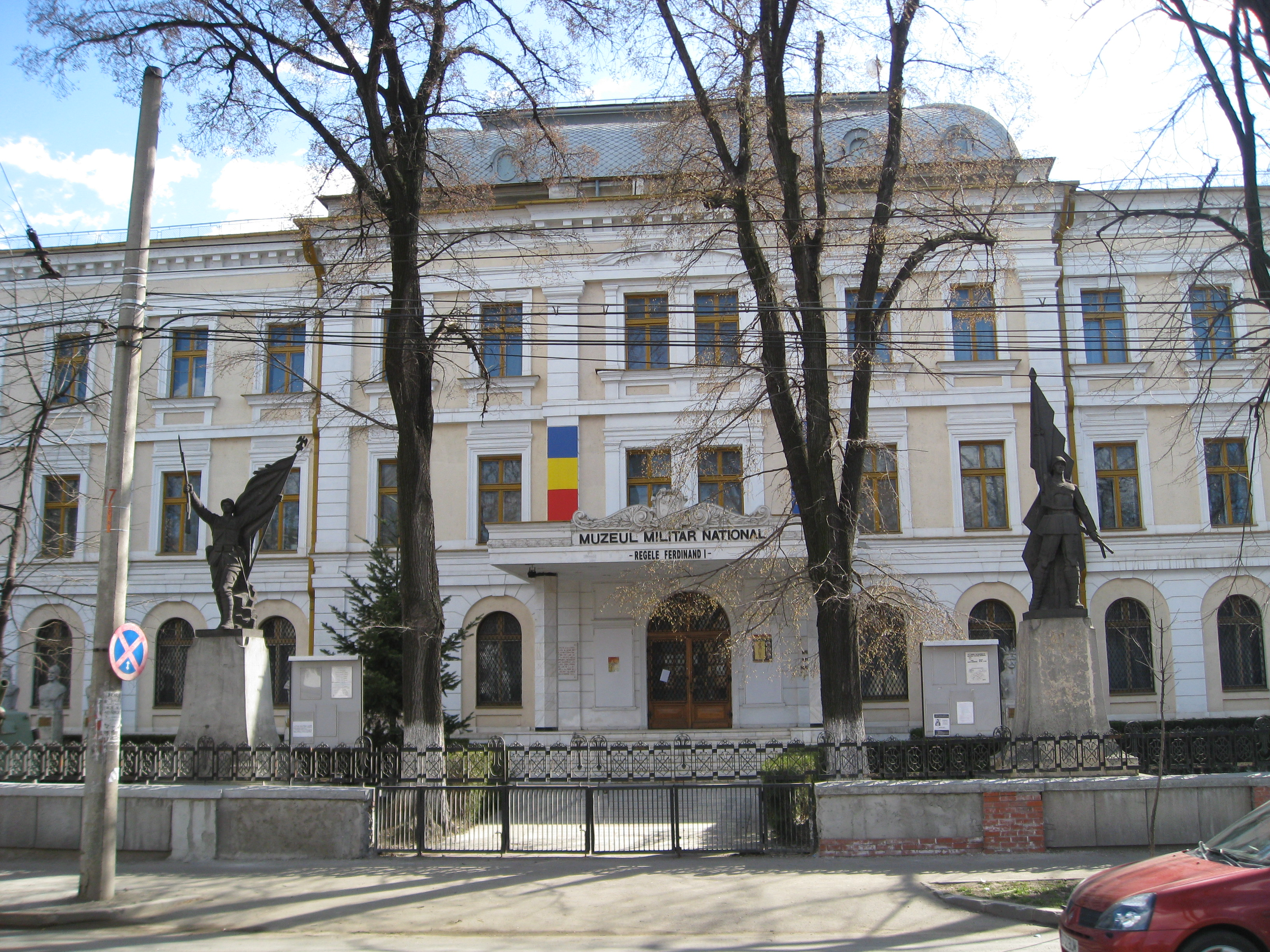
- Main entrance
- Established: 18 December 1923
- Location: Bucharest, Romania
- Coordinates: 44.441364°N 26.076393°E
- Website: www.muzeulmilitar.ro/en/

The King Ferdinand I National Military Museum (Romanian: Muzeul Militar Național "Regele Ferdinand I"), located at 125-127 Mircea Vulcănescu St., Bucharest, Romania, was established on 18 December 1923 by King Ferdinand I. It has been at its present site since 1988, in a building finished in 1998.

== In film ==
The 2018 film I Do Not Care If We Go Down in History as Barbarians was partially shot on the museum premises, both inside and in the yard.

== Gallery of exhibits ==
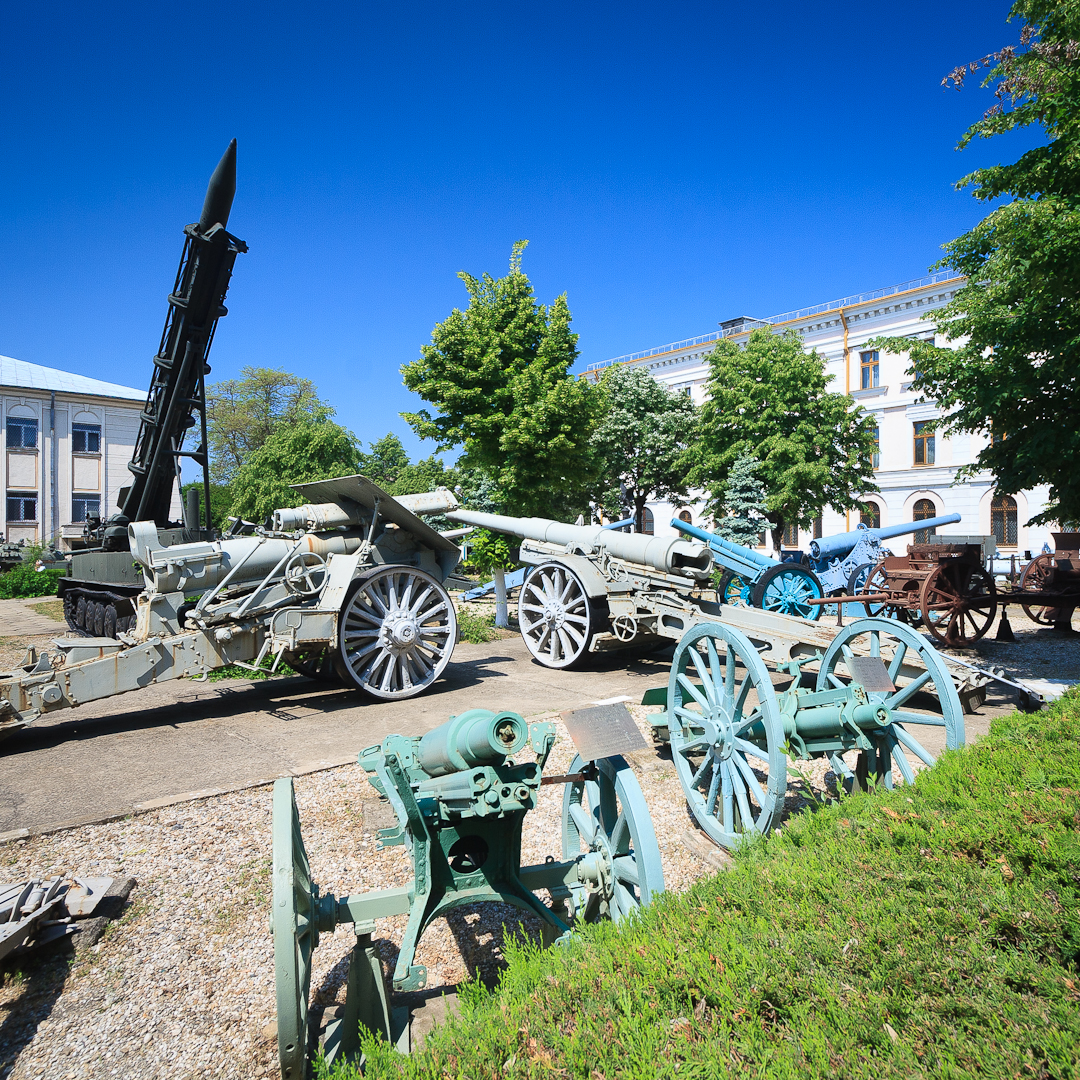
Yard

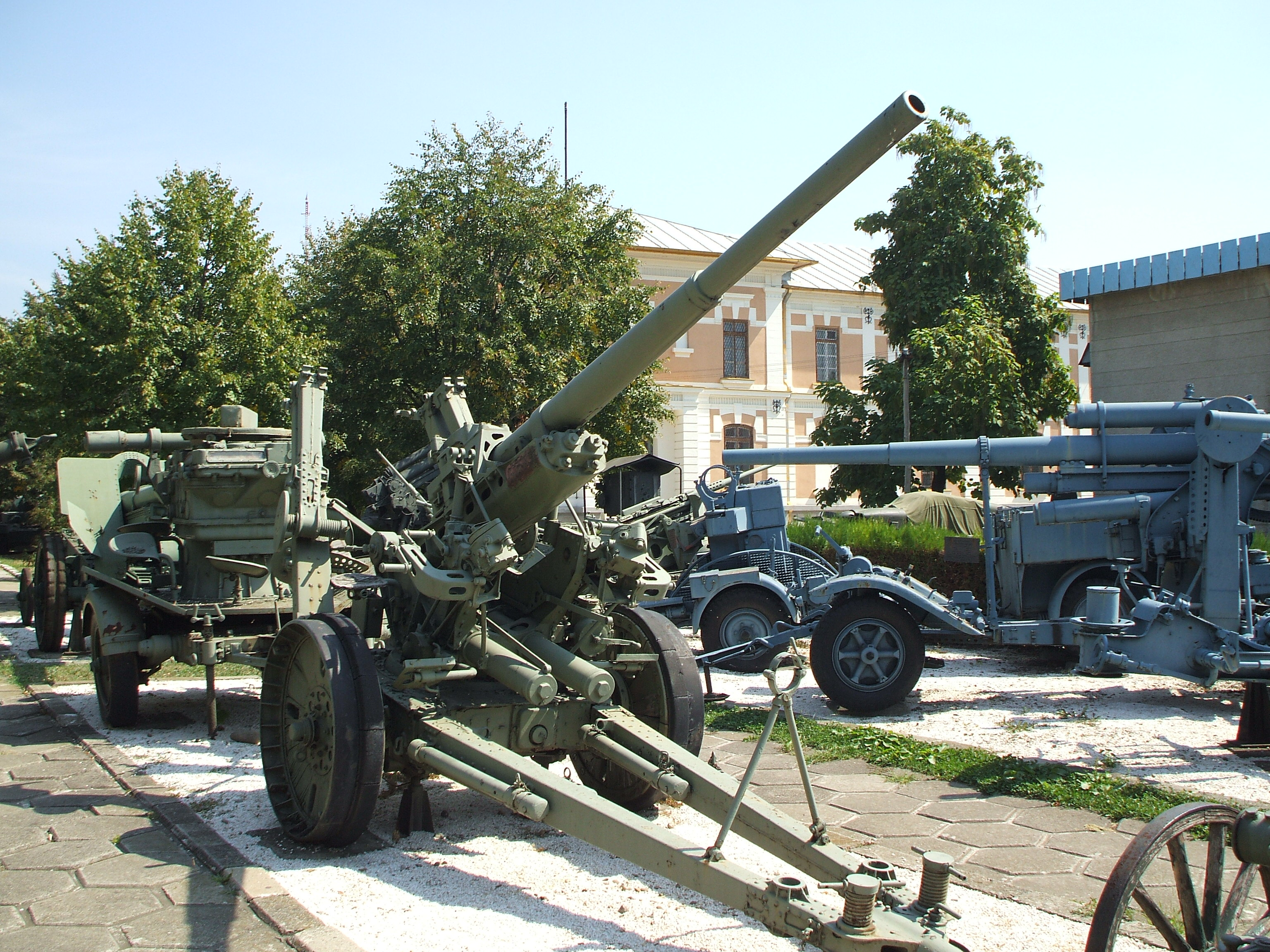
A Vickers/Reșița anti-aircraft gun

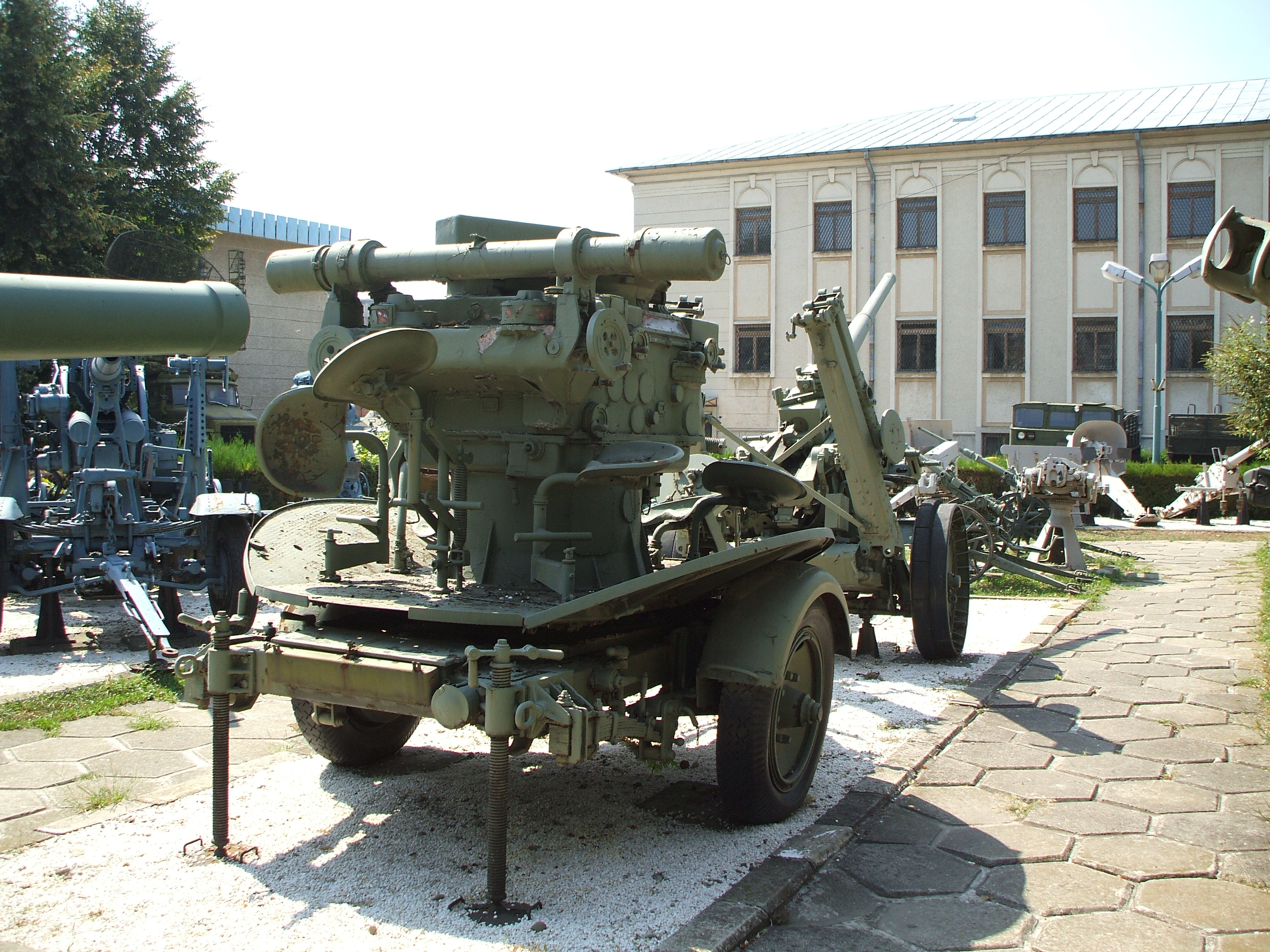
Bungescu M1938 Fire Control System

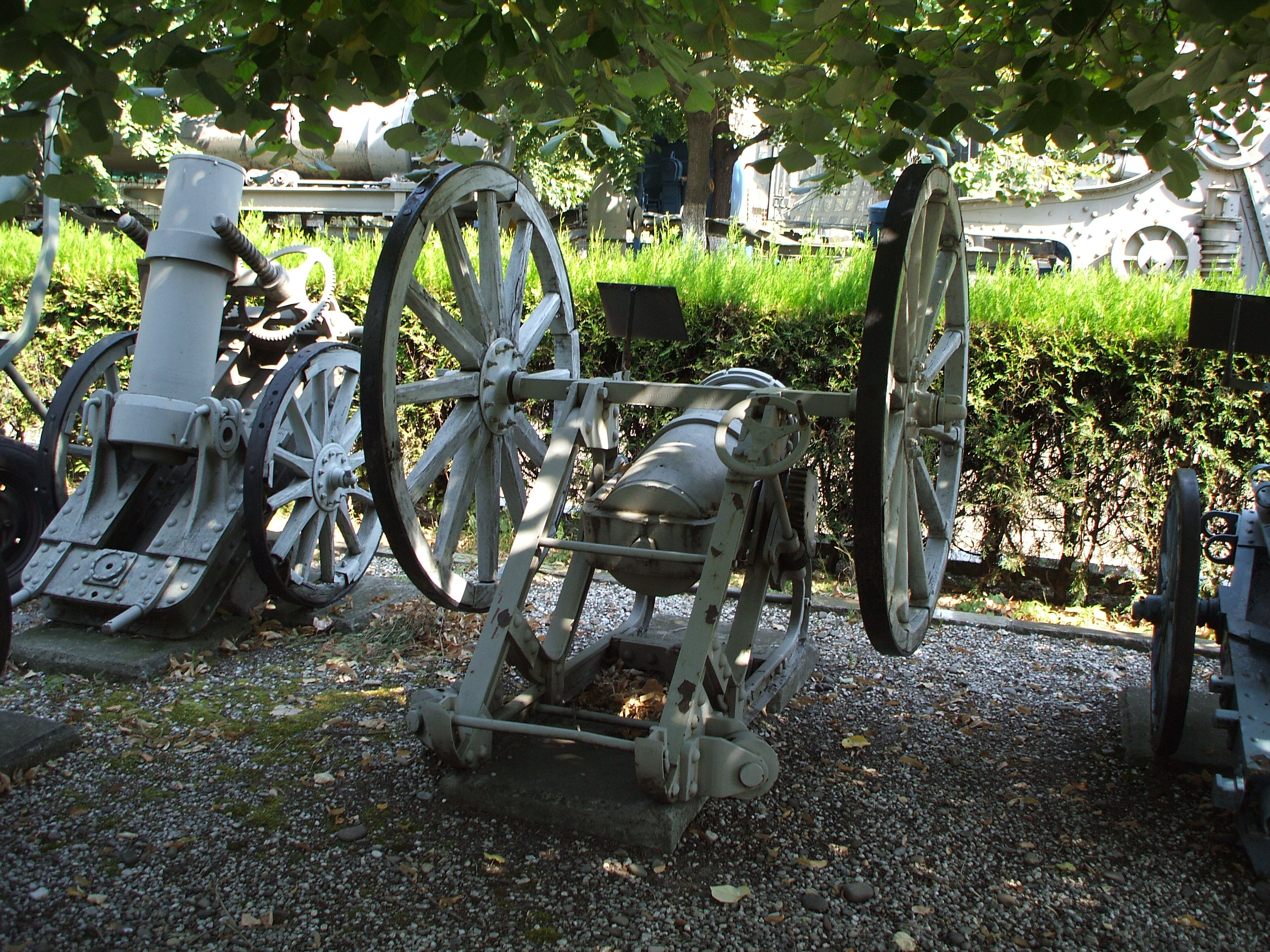
A Negrei Model 1916 heavy mortar

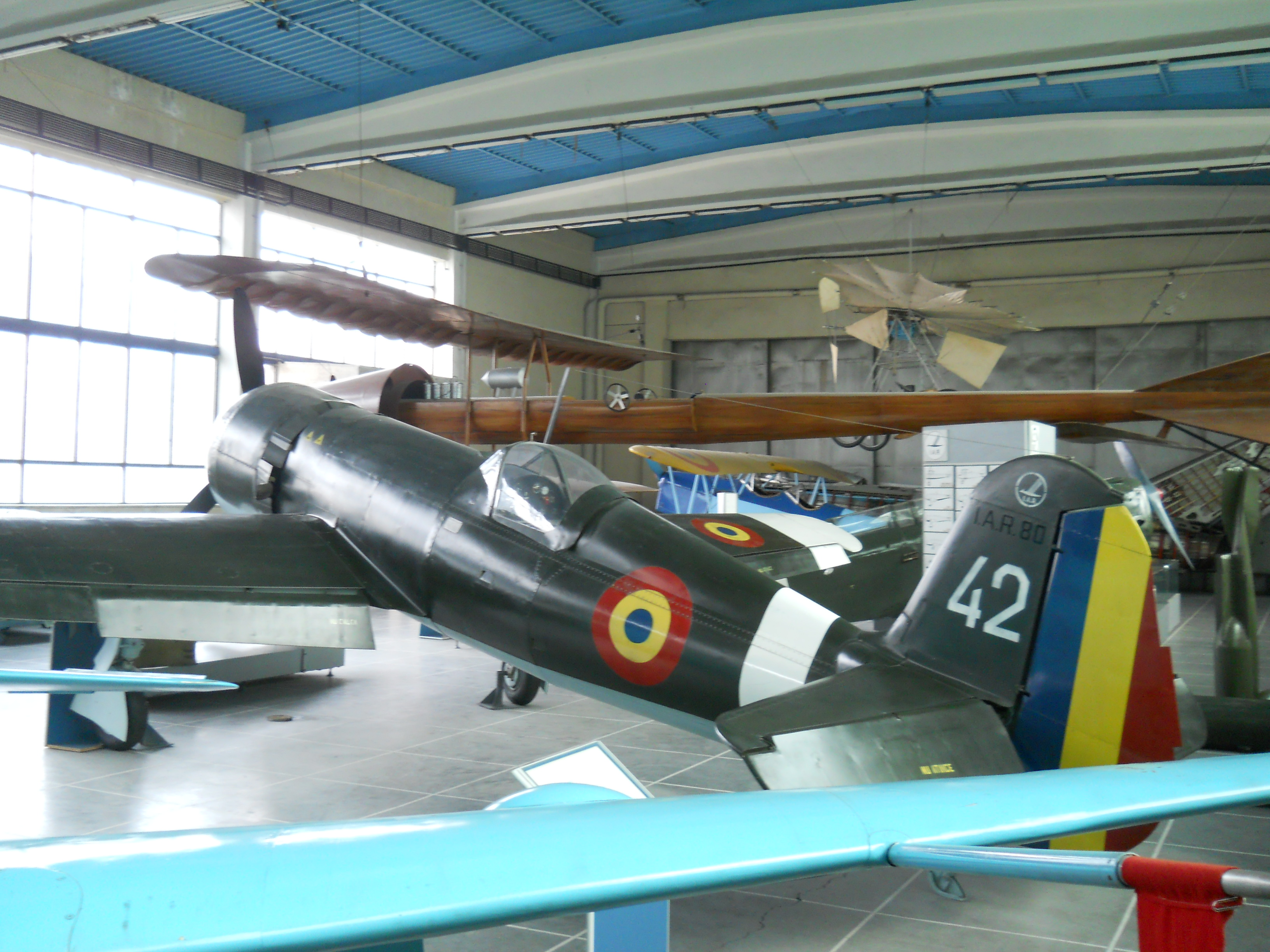
An IAR-80 fighter aircraft replica

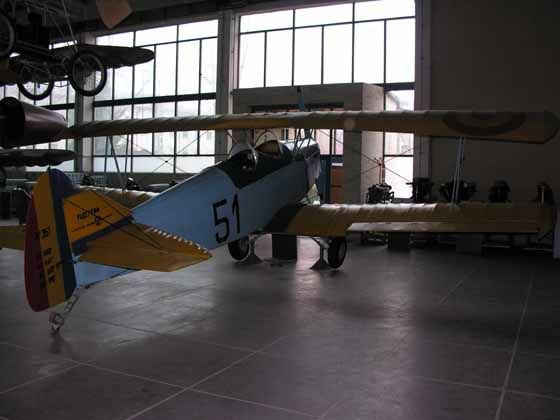
Fleet 10G training aircraft

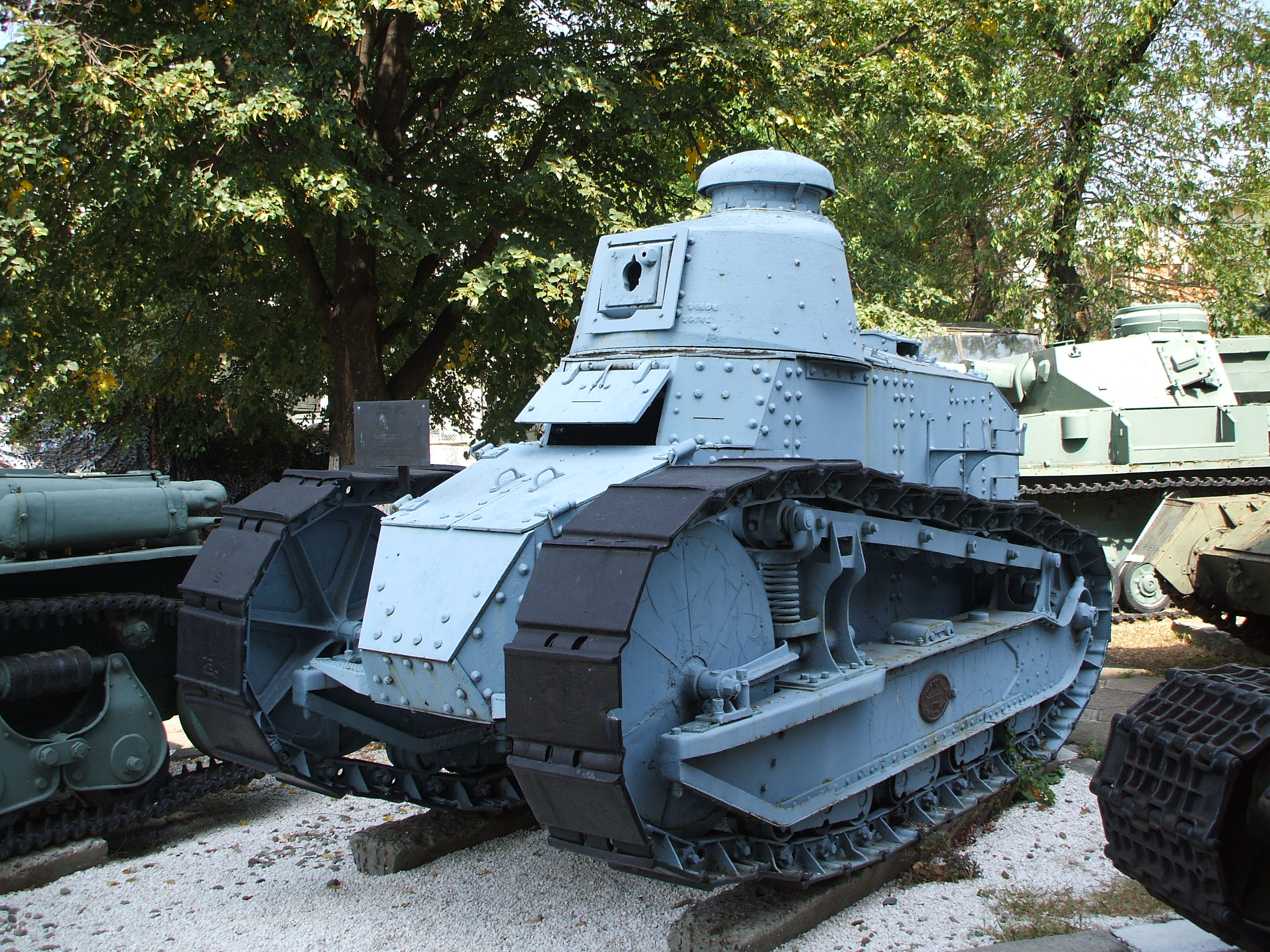
A Renault FT tank

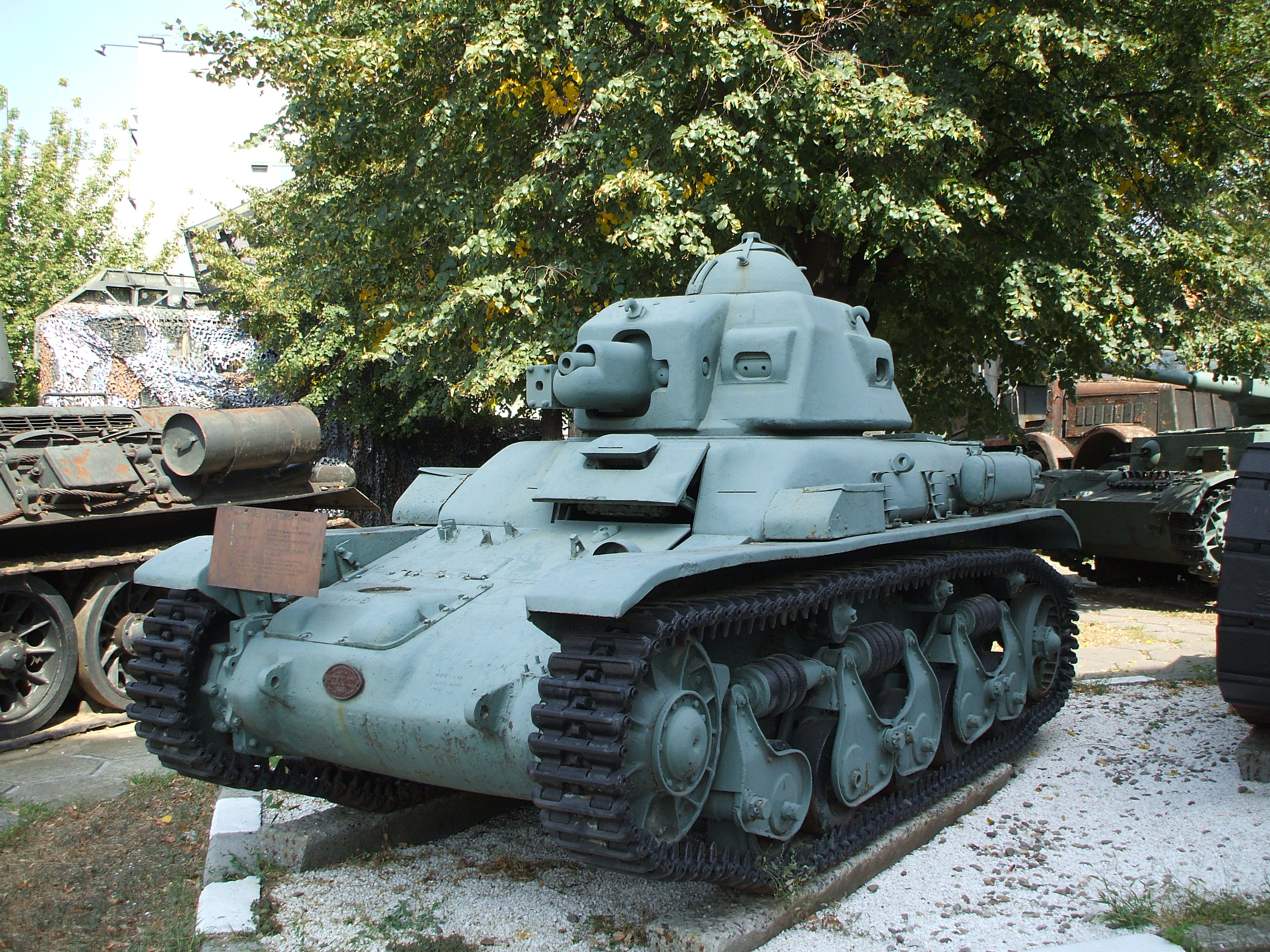
A Renault R35 tank

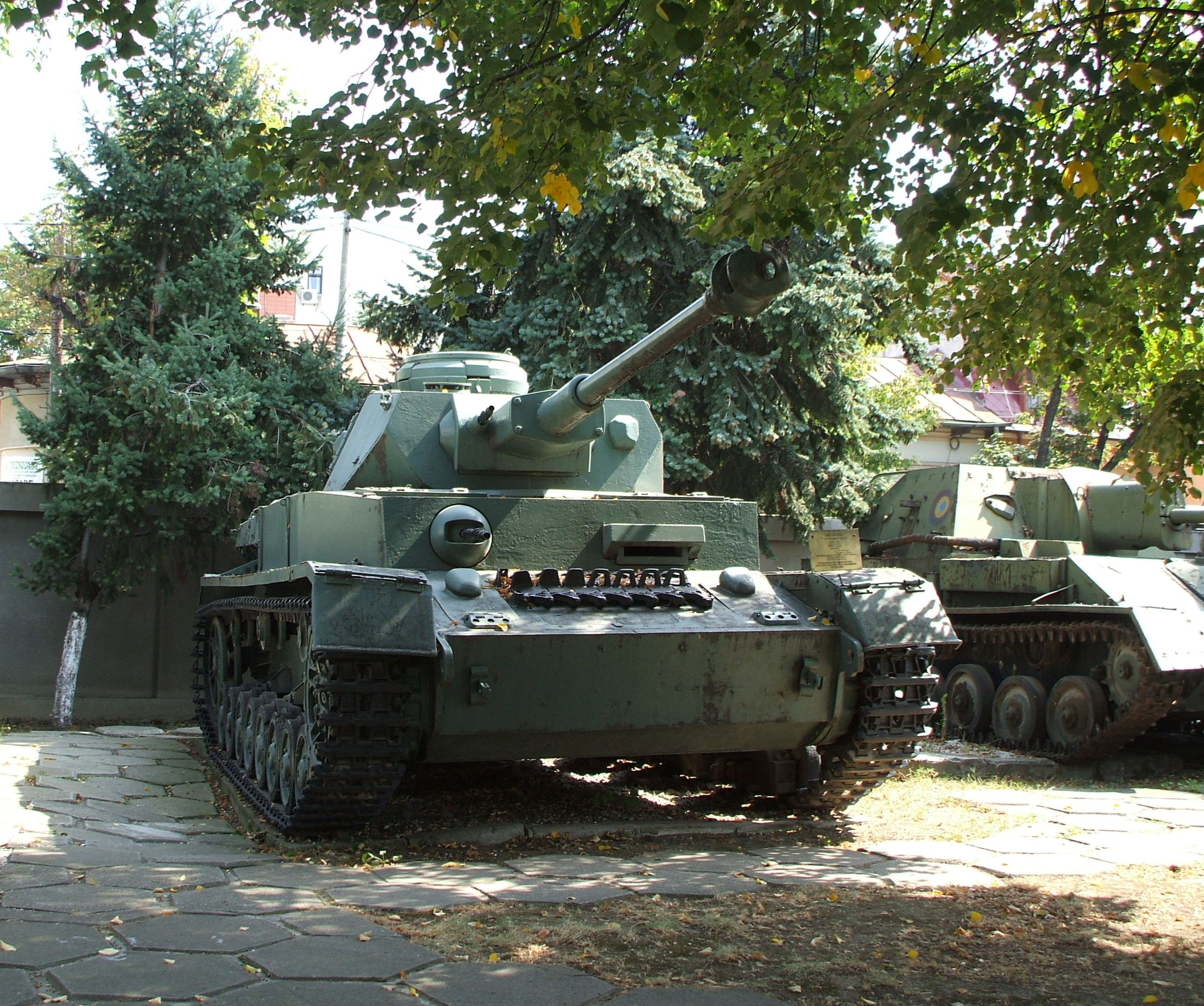
A Panzer IV tank

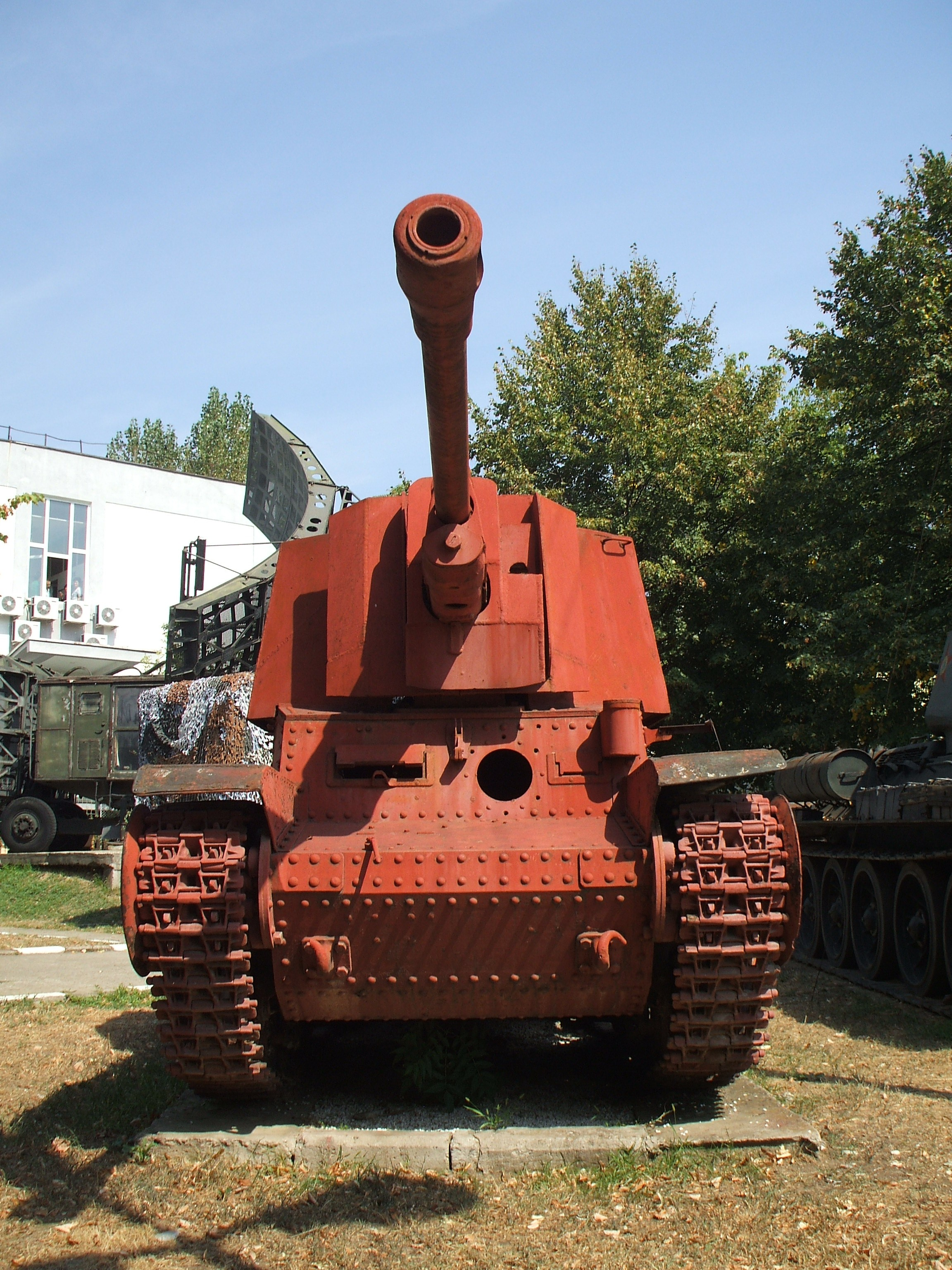
TACAM R-2 tank destroyer
