= Reșița Works =

Heavy industry companies in Romania

Coordinates: 45.295°N 21.903°E

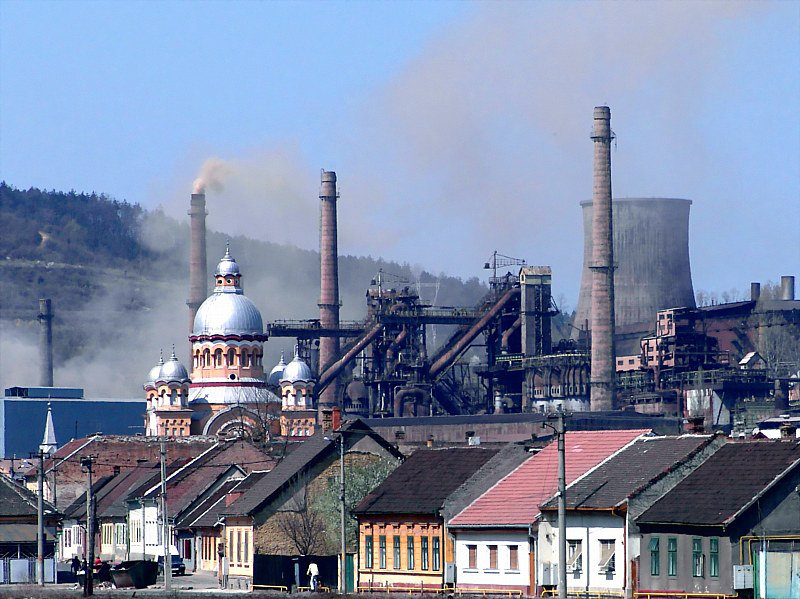
Dormition of the Theotokos Church flanked by blast furnaces

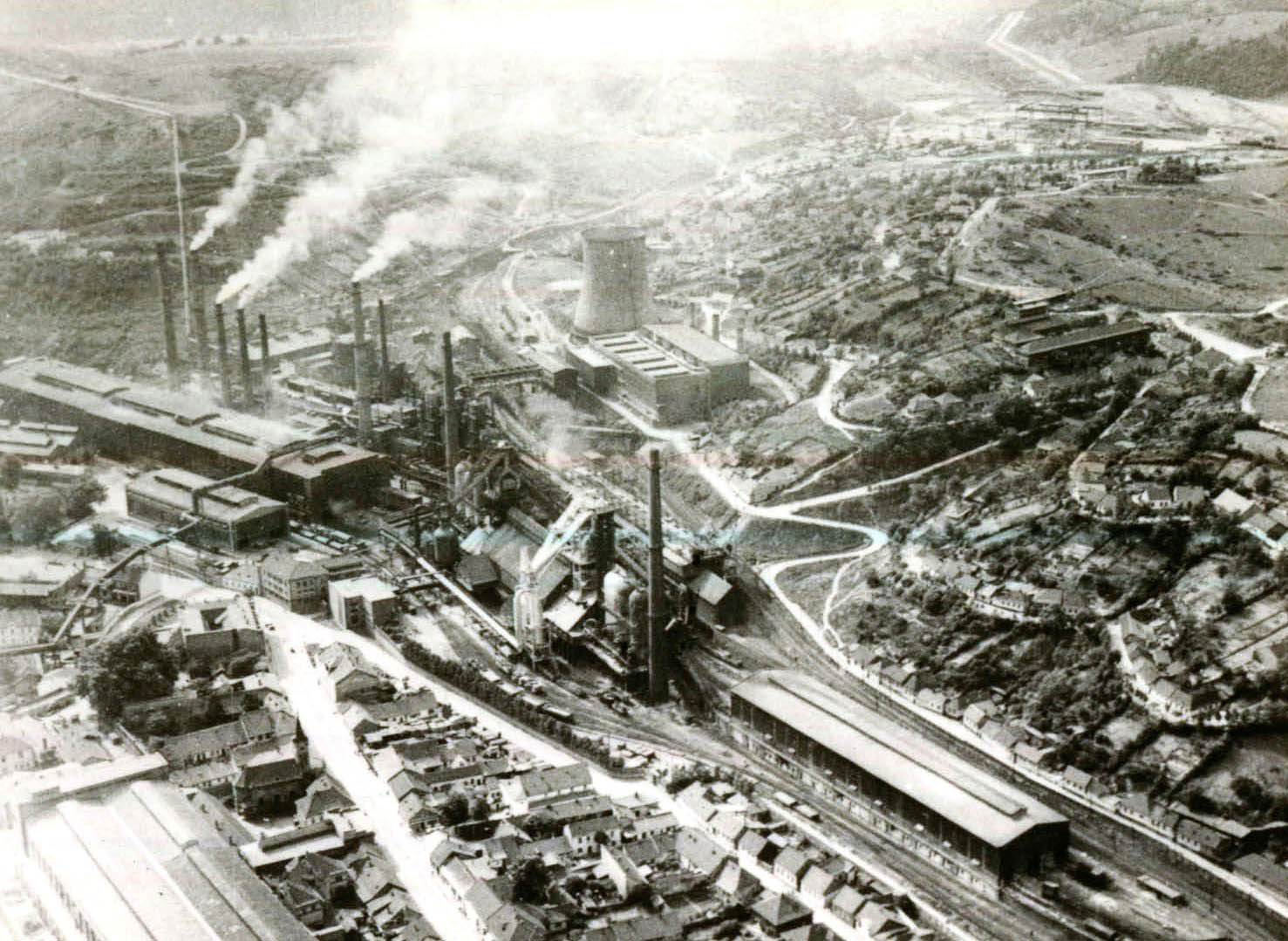
The steel works in 1970

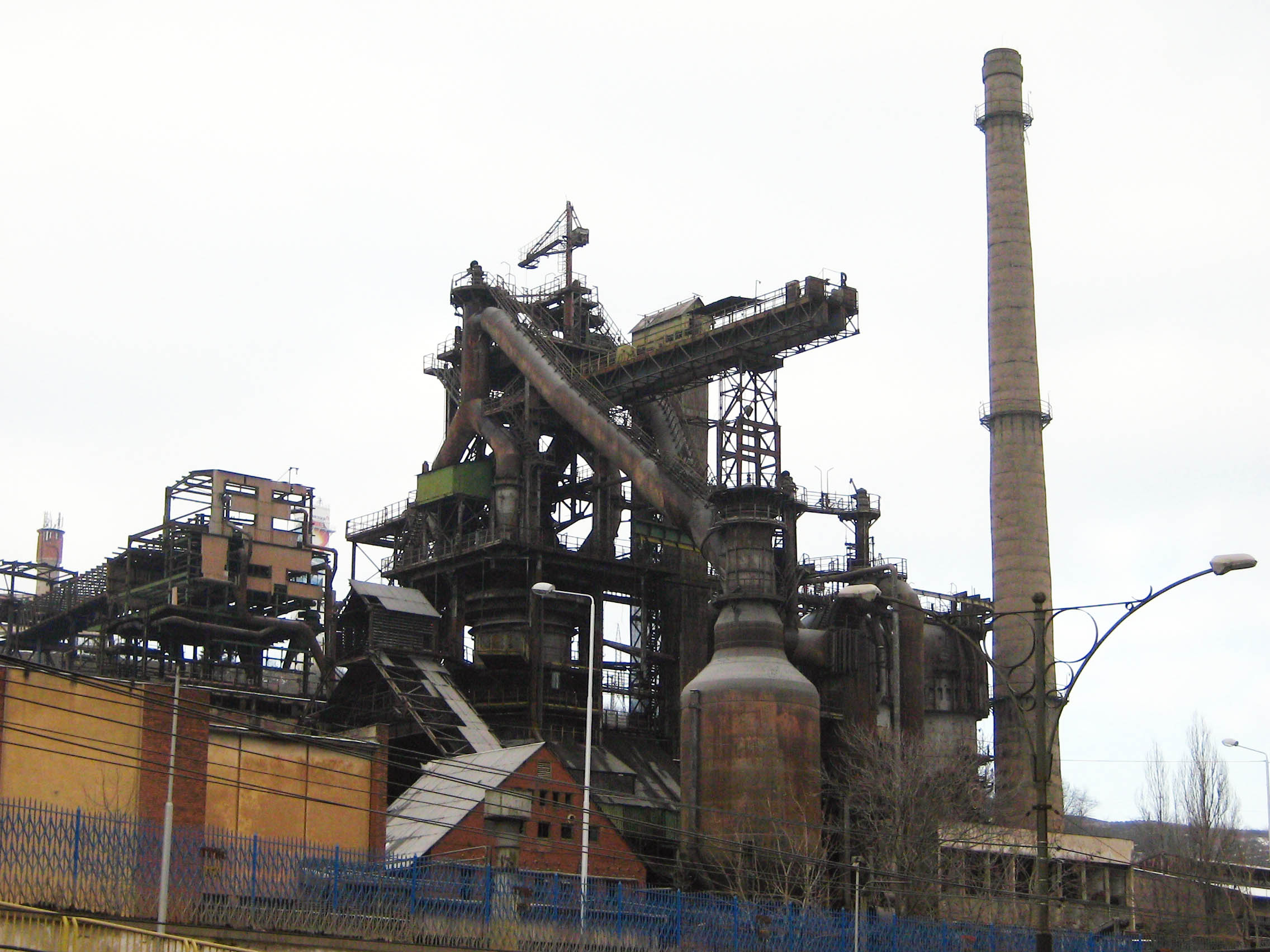
The historic blast furnace #2, completed 1962

The Reșița Works are two companies, TMK Reșița and UCM Reșița, located in Reșița, in the Banat region of Romania. Founded in 1771 and operating under a single structure until 1948 and then from 1954 to 1962, during the Communist era they were known respectively as the Reșița Steel Works (Combinatul Siderurgic Reșița) and as the Reșița Machine Building Plant (Uzina Constructoare de Mașini Reșița), the latter renamed in 1973 as the Reșița Machine Building Enterprise (Întreprinderea de Construcții de Mașini Reșița). They have played a crucial role in the industrial development both of the region and of Romania as a whole, and their evolution has been largely synonymous with that of their host city.

== History ==
=== Beginnings and growth ===
The Habsburg monarchy, which then ruled the Banat, was interested in developing extractive metallurgy in the province, and began building furnaces for iron ore smelting in Reșița in 1769, those at Bocșa proving inadequate for its industrial needs. The works trace their origins to July 3, 1771, when the first furnaces and forges were inaugurated, making it the oldest industrial factory in present-day Romania. At first, metalworking was the focus of activity, but machinery manufacturing gradually gained prominence, becoming the main occupation in the last quarter of the 19th century. For decades, the two complemented each other within the same integrated factory. Until 1855, the works belonged to the Treasury of what had become the Austrian Empire, which exercised control through the Banat Mining Directorate in Oravița. By 1815, they were producing cast iron pieces coming directly from the furnaces, rods forged from iron, hoops for cart wheels, tools, nails and utensils for agricultural and home use.

In 1855, with the empire facing financial crisis and looking to sell, the works were bought by an international consortium, the Imperial Royal Privileged Austrian State Railway Company (K.u.K Oberprivillegierte Staatseisenbahn Gesellschaft or St.E.G.). Aside from the Reșița Works, this company also owned land and mining, metalworking and railway properties in the Banat and Bohemia, a locomotive factory in Vienna and the concession for building and operating a railway network of some 5,000 km (3,100 mi), and was financed by one French and two Austrian banks. A persistent legend holds that in the late 1880s, metal produced at Reșița was sent to France to be used in building the Eiffel Tower. However, there is no documentary evidence to support this claim. Since their opening, the development and fortunes of the works have been deeply entwined with the history of the city itself. An important element of their success was due to their relative self-sufficiency; over time, the works tended to use raw materials and energy sources produced on-site.

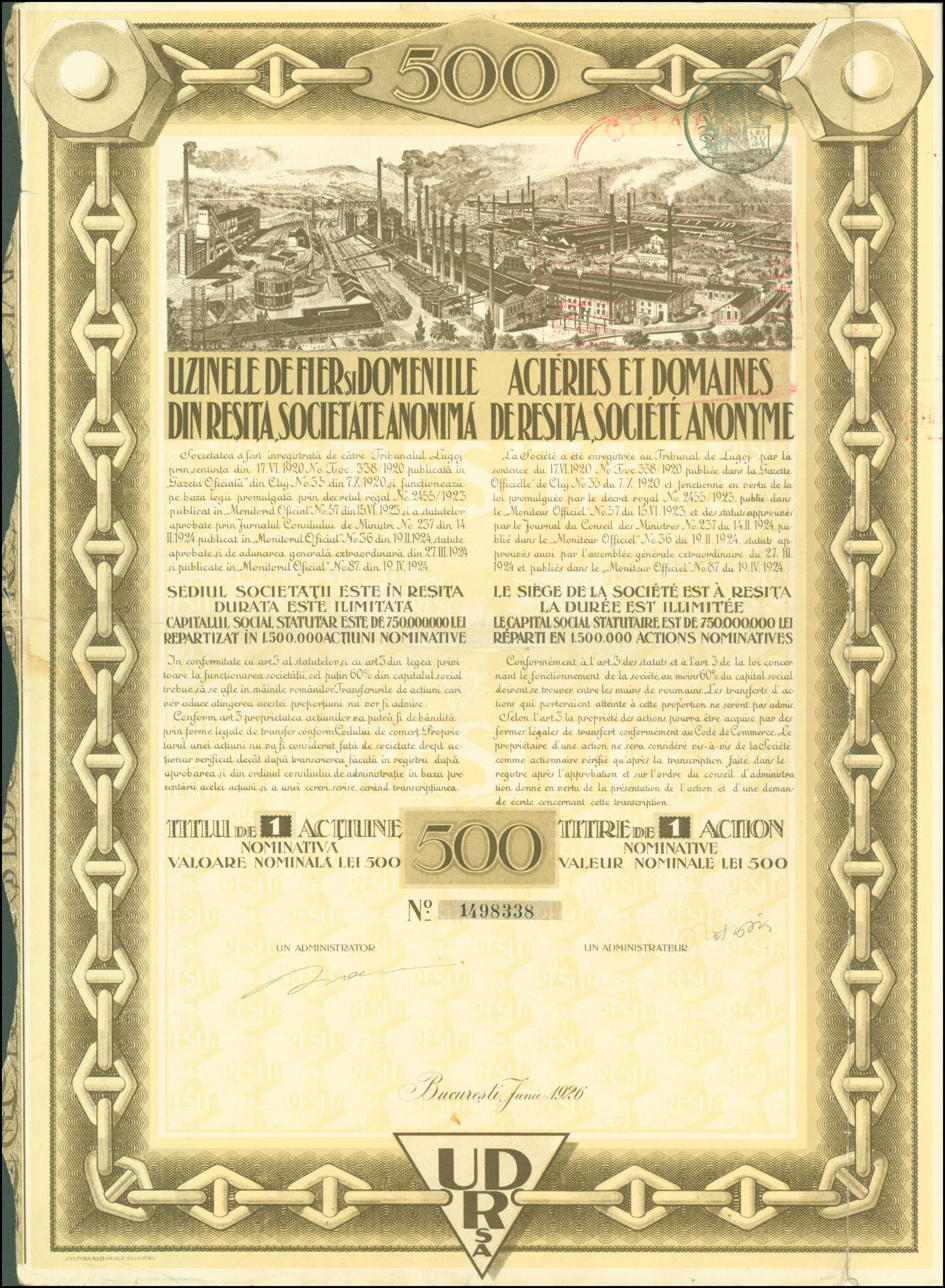
Share of the Reșița Works (Uzinele de Fier și Domeniile Reșița), issued June 1926

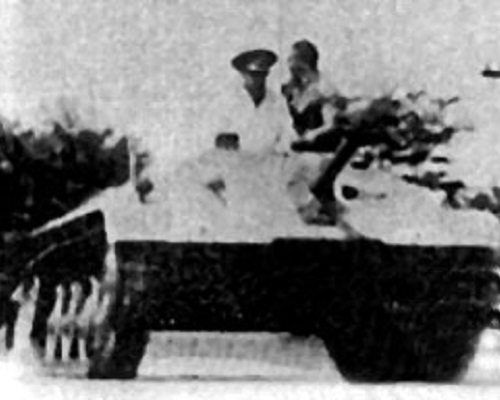
The Mareșal tank destroyer had its armor plates and gun produced by the Reșița Works

Following the union of Transylvania with Romania, including the Banat, a 1920 royal decree transformed St.E.G.'s Romanian holdings into the Steel Works and Domains of Reșița (Uzinele de Fier și Domeniile Reșița; U.D.R. or U.D.R.I.N.) company. A "workshops directorate" belonging to the company was built on the left bank of the Bârzava River; this included the machine works, the old industrial platform of today's UCM Reșița, where the first St.E.G. workshops were also built between 1886 and 1891. By surface area, over 90% of the company properties were forests, but they also included iron, coal and copper mines; vineyards; roads; and limestone quarries.

Starting in the 1920s, the works had the following divisions: blast furnaces; a coking plant; steelworks; rolling mills; a foundry; a forge; a factory for bridges and metal structures; a factory for mounted wheels; an old machine factory; a factory for petroleum extraction equipment; an armaments factory; a factory for electric machinery; and a locomotives factory with a capacity of 100 units per year. Among the main products generated were steam locomotives, including repairs; mounted wheels, including axles; wheel bandages, metal bridges, railroad switches and other rail equipment; metal frames for buildings and factories; moveable bridges; electric machinery and equipment such as motors, generators and transformers; petroleum extraction equipment, including pumpjacks, couplings, heavy drill bits, pump units, rotary engine parts, crown blocks and gear reducers; and armaments, such as artillery, gun carriages, 75 mm Vickers antitank and antiaircraft guns; coastal artillery; naval mines; and Brandt 60 mm and 120 mm mortars. In terms of revenue and number of employees, the company was the largest in Romania, with the latter figure reaching 22,892 in 1948. In 1939, following the German occupation of Czechoslovakia, the Nazi regime took over Československá Zbrojovka's one-tenth share in Reșița. Together with other incursions into Romanian industry, this move seriously undermined the attempts of King Carol II to maintain an independent foreign policy. Subsequently, commercial and technical management ended up in the hands of Reichswerke Hermann Göring.

=== Nationalization ===
In June 1948, the new Communist regime nationalized the company, along with 350 others. For over a year, it kept its former name but was gradually integrated into the new government structure. A decree issued in August 1949 led to its effective disaggregation by the end of the year, and its components were folded into two SovRom joint ventures, Sovrommetal (the iron extraction division) and Sovrom Utilaj Petrolier (the machine production division). Thus, for the first time, the Reșița Works were divided in two. In September 1954, with the end of the SovRom period, they were reunited into one entity, the Reșița Metallurgical Works (Combinatul Metalurgic Reșița) under the Ministry of Heavy Industry, later the Ministry of Metallurgy and Machine Building. After 1948, although the Reșița Works remained the most important heavy industry producers in Romania, they were gradually marginalized as well, with a series of units being shut down: metal structures and bridges (1953-1958); petroleum extraction equipment (1954-1955); railroad switches (1955); transformers, electric equipment and medium-sized electric motors (1957); mounted wheels (1959); moveable bridges and cranes (after 1973); thermal energy equipment such as steam turbines, turbo generators and related devices (1977); and locomotive bogies (1981).

At the same time, significant technological advances were incorporated. Among the devices introduced were steam turbines and turbo generators; new air compressors; diesel locomotives and bogies; electrical bushings; hydroelectric units including hydraulic turbines, generators and rotation regulators; Diesel engines for marine propulsion; equipment for the chemical and metallurgical industries; fluid mechanics equipment like hydraulic pumps and large hydraulic servo motors. At the same time, steam locomotives were phased out. During four decades of a planned economy, no significant economic development program on a national scale—including the program to develop the energy supply through thermoelectric and hydroelectric machines and equipment; the nuclear power program; and the programs to develop rail transport, the naval fleet, the metallurgical, mining and chemical industries—was undertaken without a certain degree of involvement from the Reșița Works, whether by incorporating or producing machines and equipment. Additionally, their products were exported to nearly forty countries.

=== Split and subsequent privatization ===
On April 1, 1962, the works were again split into two separate entities meant to operate in tandem: the Reșița Steel Works (Combinatul Siderurgic Reșița; CSR) and the Reșița Machine Building Plant (Uzina Constructoare de Mașini Reșița; UCMR or UCM).

The Communist regime fell in 1989, and CSR had begun to decline by 1993. In December 1994, a demonstration of the 6,800 remaining workers and 30,000 Reșița residents brought about investments and new equipment. CSR became a public company in 1996. Its first privatization in 2000, undertaken by a government eager to be divested of a debt-ridden entity, was a failure. CSR's takeover by an American company accused of failing to fulfill its promise of improving the plant led to labor unrest. This was exploited by the extremist Greater Romania Party, which took control of regular demonstrations where slogans against joining the European Union and NATO became increasingly commonplace; finally, in June 2001, the government announced it would go to court to scrap the contract because of the nationwide "economic and social destabilization" risked by allowing the situation to continue. The process was restarted in 2003, and the following year, the state sold it off. A subsidiary of the Russian firm OAO TMK, it has been known as TMK Reșița since 2006. It produces tubular billets, heavy round profiles and blooms, and started putting out blanks in 2007. By 2011, the number of employees had fallen to 800, from 10,400 in 1990.

UCMR was under the control of various ministries, its name being changed in 1973 to Reșița Machine Building Enterprise (Întreprinderea de Construcții de Mașini Reșița; ICMR). Between 1969 and 1973, it was the hub of Reșița Plants Group (Grupul de Uzine Reșița), which also included a metal structures plant in Bocșa, a machine plant in Caransebeș, a mechanical plant in Timișoara and an institute for research and planning hydroelectric equipment in Reșița. After the Romanian Revolution, it regained the UCMR name in 1991, and underwent a privatization process starting in 1993. This concluded in 2003, when the state sold the remainder of its shares. Largely owned by a Swiss company and with some 2500 employees, it is involved with machining operations on machine tools, welding, heat and thermochemical treatments and electroplating.

Four industrial elements of the Reșița Works are listed as historic monuments: the UCM locomotive factory, and from the CSR, blast furnace #2, the brick factory and the puddling and steam laminating workshop. In addition, two villas belonging to the UCM authorities are listed, as well as a number of those belonging to the UDR leadership. Although blast furnace #1 was demolished, the remaining one, representing the fifth generation of blast furnaces on the same site, was left standing due to its symbolic significance in the city's cultural identity and contribution to the industrial landscape. By the early 1990s, the works had caused serious air, water and soil pollution, making Reșița among the most severely polluted areas of Eastern Europe.

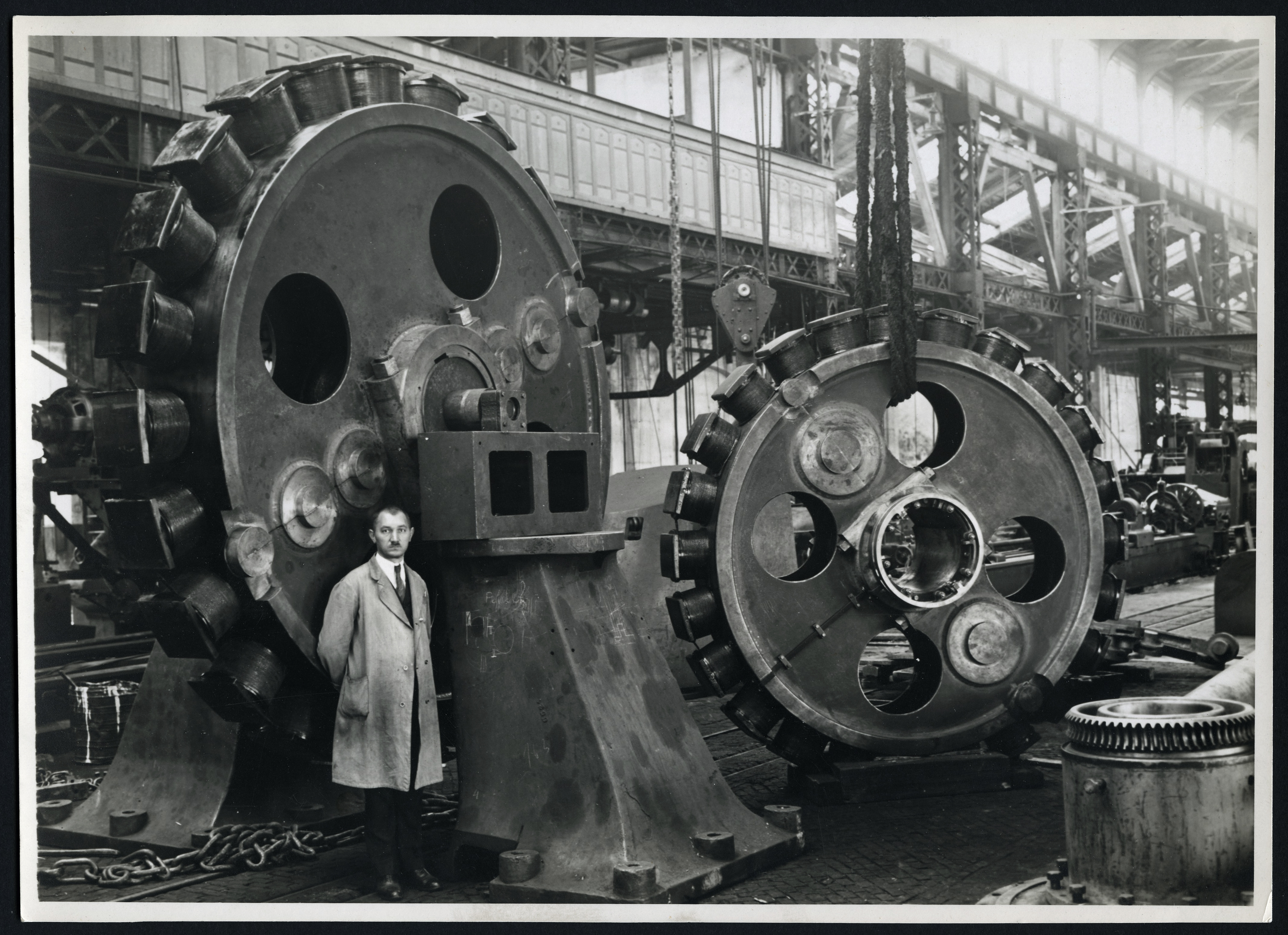
Generator rotors

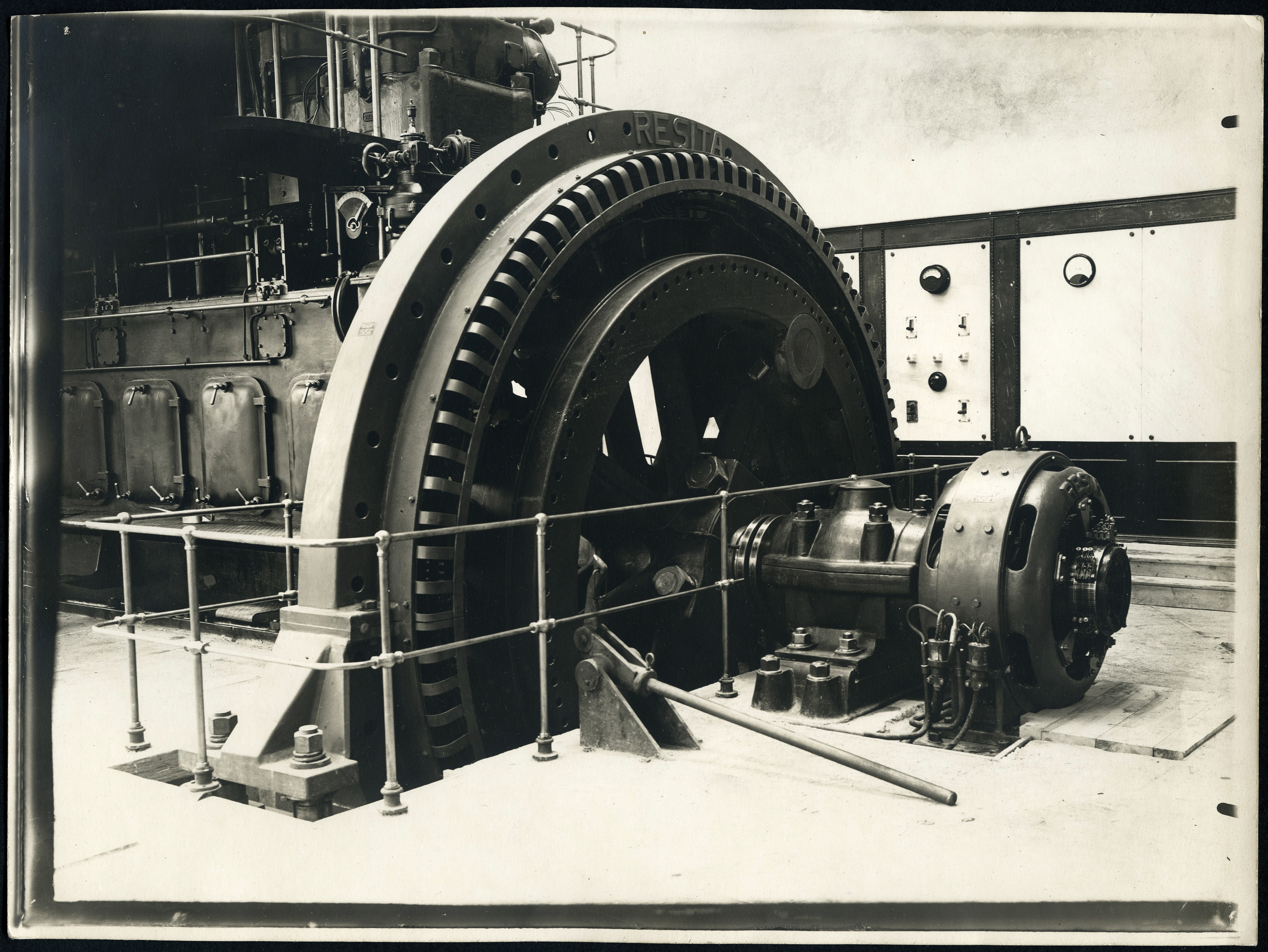
Diesel generator

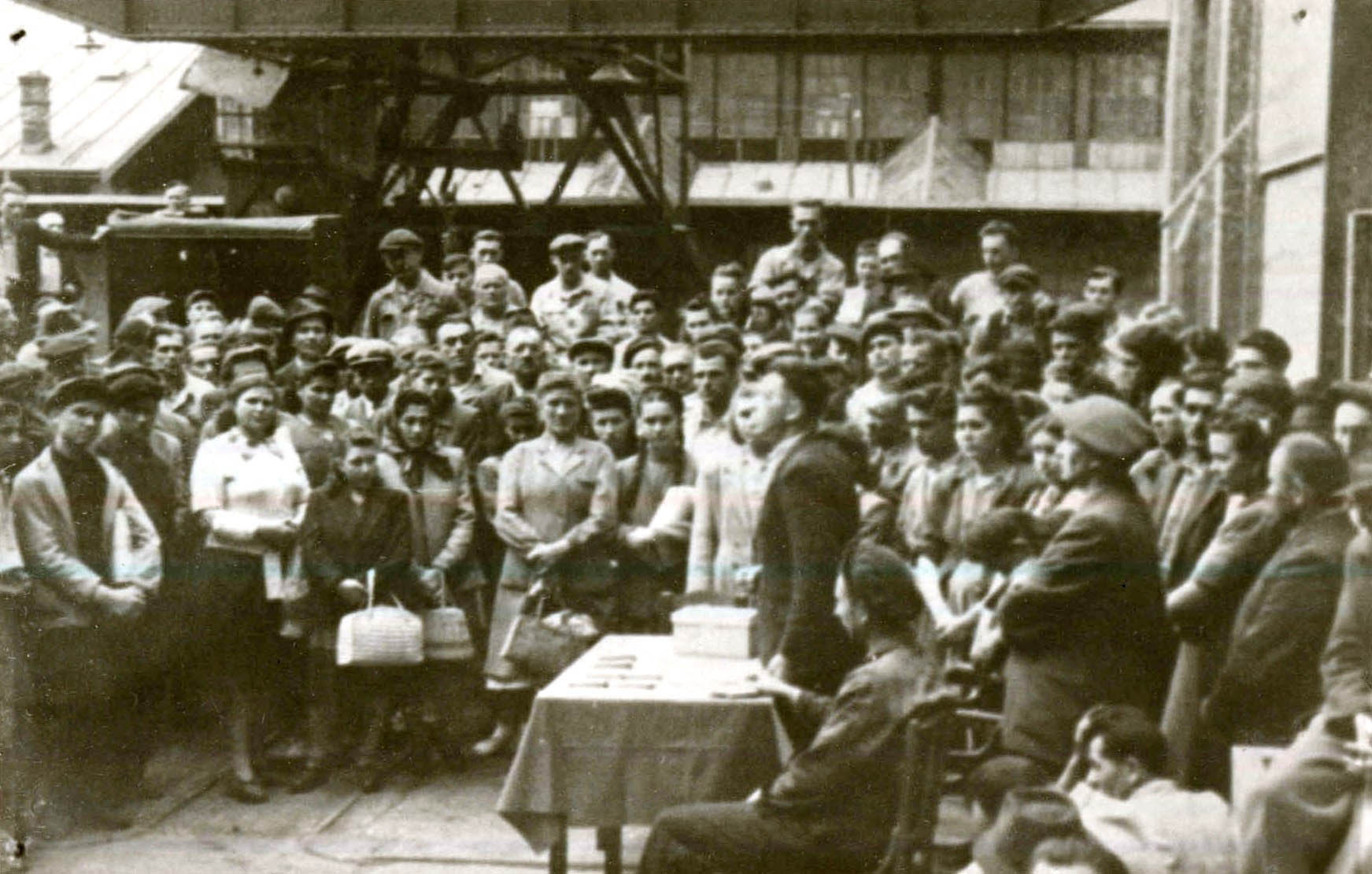
Machine workers during nationalization (1948)

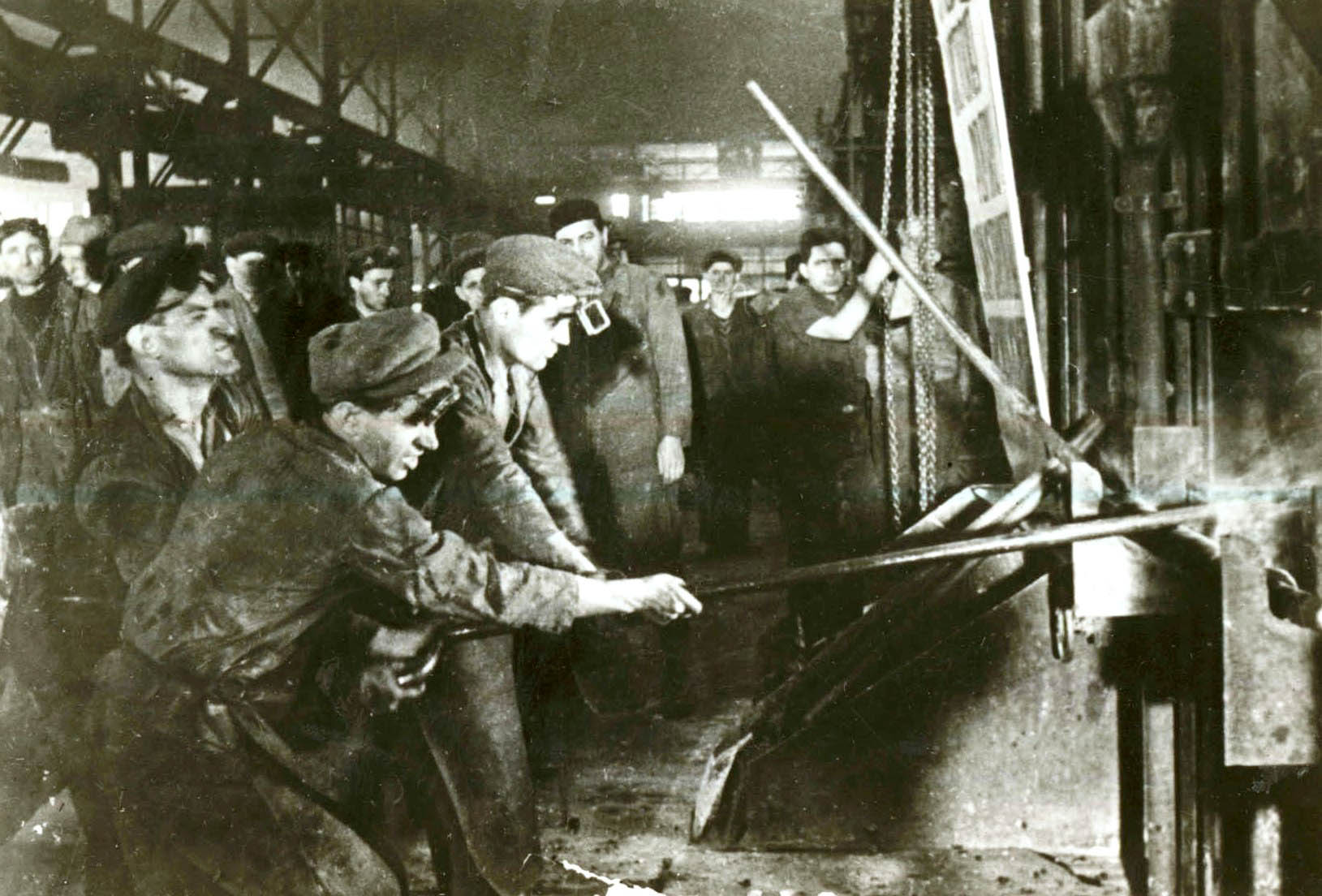
Steel workers (1950)

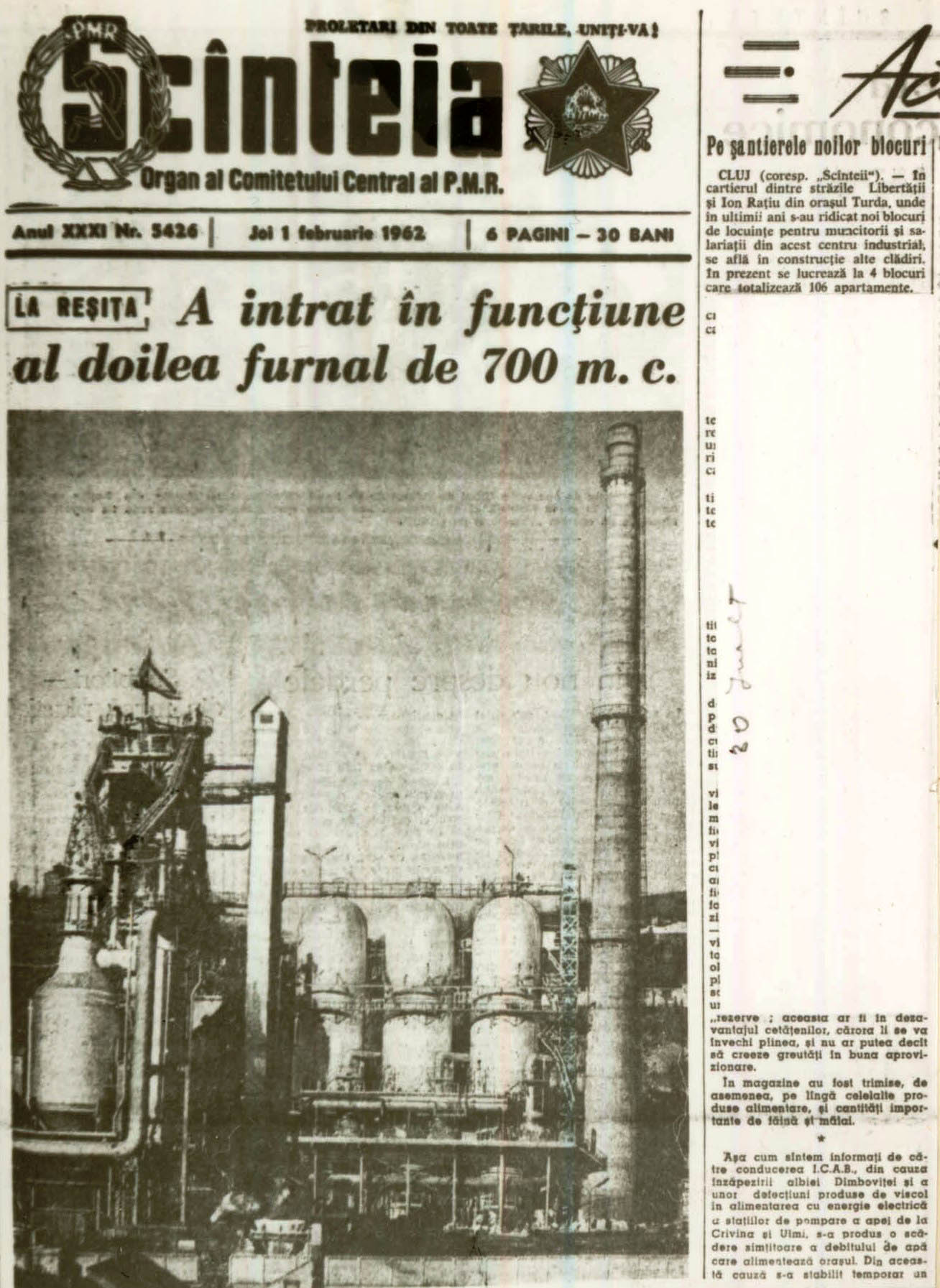
Scînteia announcement of a new blast furnace (1962)

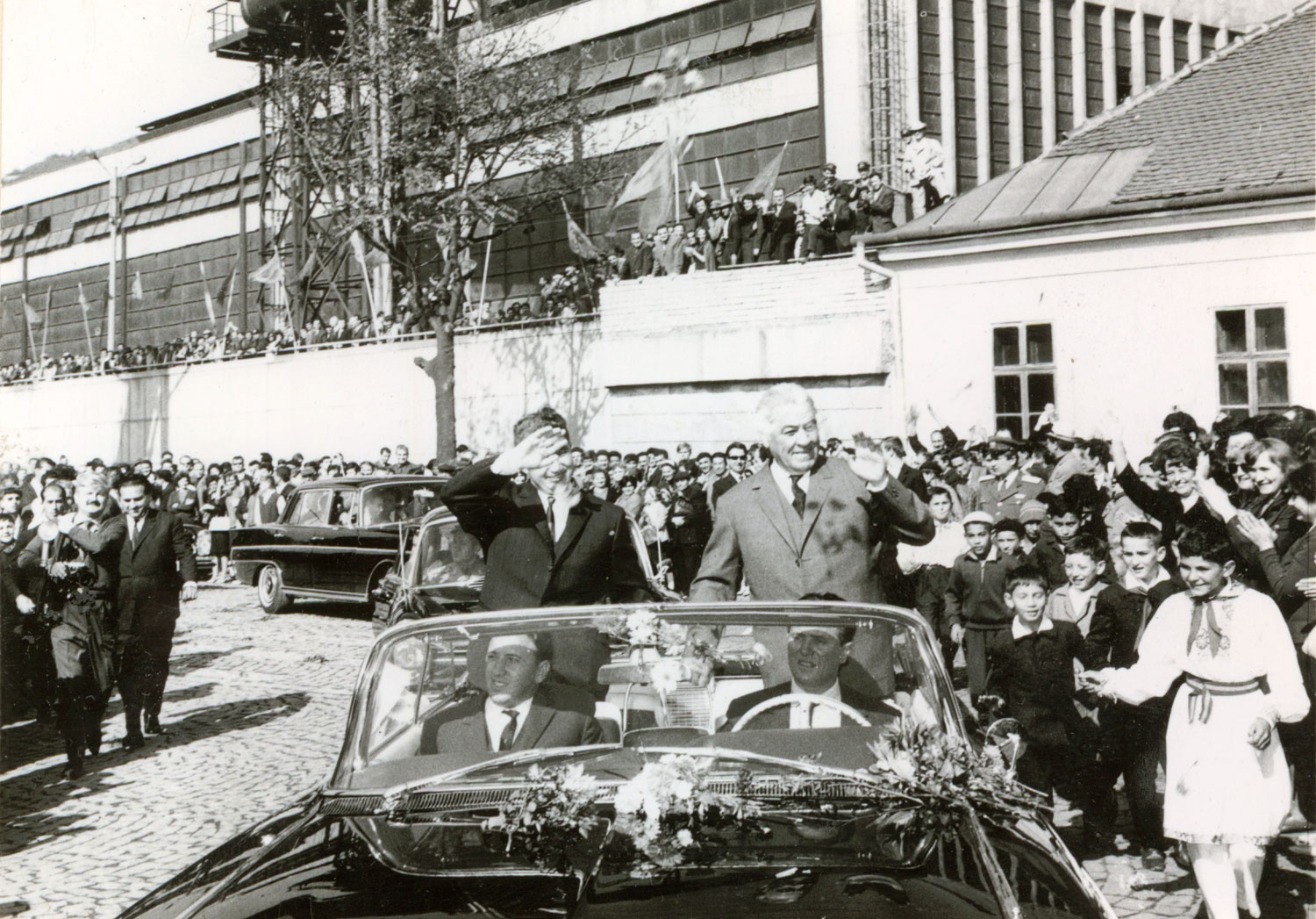
Workers welcoming Nicolae Ceaușescu and Ion Gheorghe Maurer (1968)

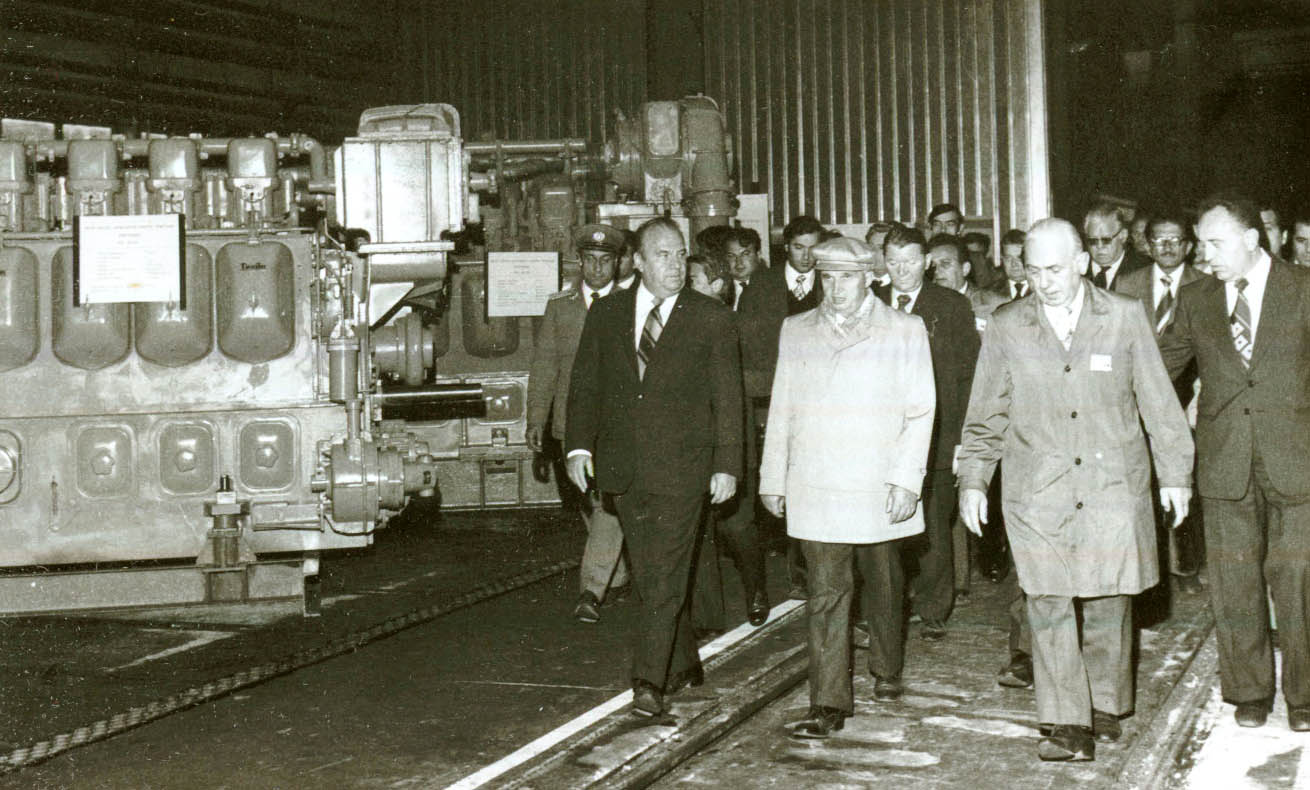
Visit by Ceaușescu to the machine factory (1978)

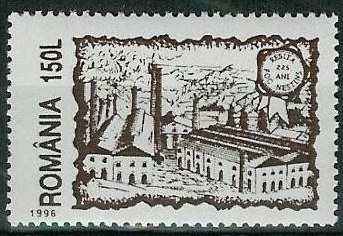
1996 postage stamp commemorating 225 years of operations

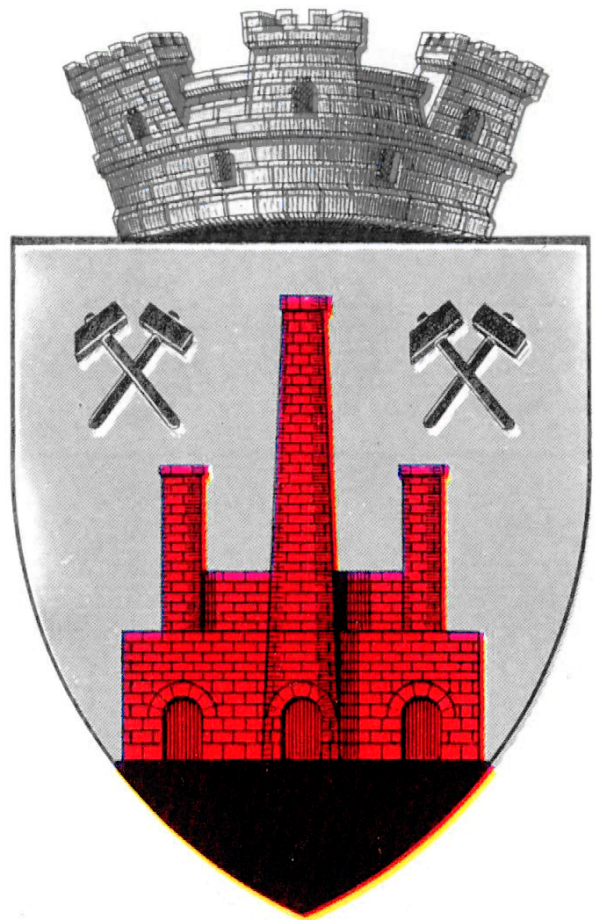
Reșița coats of arms: interwar period

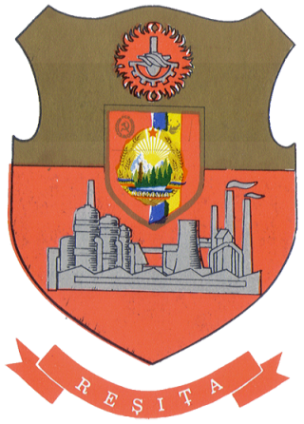
Communist period

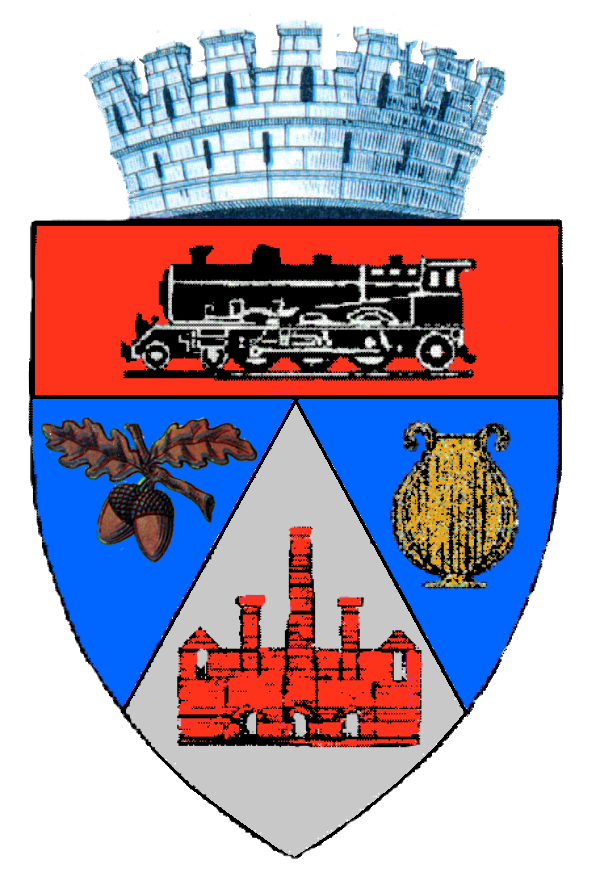
Present day

== See also ==
- Galați steel works
- FAUR
- Electroputere
