= BT tank =

BT-2, BT-5, BT-7, BT-7M
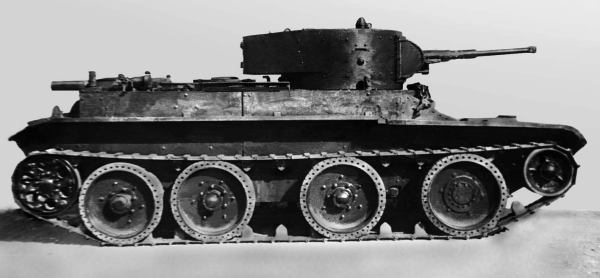
- BT-5 side view
- Type: Light cavalry tank
- Place of origin: Soviet Union

Service history
- In service: 1932–45
- Used by: Soviet Union; Second Spanish Republic; Francoist Spain (captured) (Republic of China (1912–1949)) /Republic of China (1912–1949); Chinese Soviet Republic; Mongolian People's Republic; Finland (captured); Kingdom of Hungary (captured); Kingdom of Romania (captured); Nazi Germany (captured); Kingdom of Afghanistan
- Wars: Spanish Civil War; Second Sino–Japanese War; Soviet–Japanese border conflicts Invasion of Poland; Winter War; World War II

Production history
- Designer: J. Walter Christie, Kharkiv Morozov Machine Building Design Bureau (KMDB)
- Designed: 1930–31
- Manufacturer: Malyshev Factory
- Produced: 1932–41
- No. built: BT-2: 650 BT-5: 1884 BT-7: 5556
- Variants: BT-2, BT-5, BT-7, BT-7M

Specifications (BT-5)
- Mass: 11.5 tonnes (12.676 tons)
- Length: 5.58 m (18 ft 4 in)
- Width: 2.23 m (7 ft 4 in)
- Height: 2.25 m (7 ft 5 in)
- Crew: 3
- Armour: 6–23 mm
- Main armament: 45 mm Model 1932 tank gun
- Secondary armament: 1-3 7.62 mm DT machine guns
- Engine: Model M-5; 400 hp (298 kW)
- Power/weight: 35 hp/tonne
- Suspension: Christie
- Fuel capacity: 360 litres (95 US gal)
- Operational range: 200 km (120 mi)
- Maximum speed: 72 km/h (44.7 mph)

The BT tank (Russian: Быстроходный танк/БТ, romanized: Bystrokhodnyy tank/BT, lit. 'fast moving tank' or 'high-speed tank') was one of a series of Soviet light tanks produced in large numbers between 1932 and 1941. They were lightly armoured, but reasonably well-armed for their time, and had the best mobility of all contemporary tanks. The BT tanks were known by the nickname Betka from the acronym, or by its diminutive Betushka. The successor of the BT tanks was the famous T-34 medium tank, introduced in 1940, which would replace all of the Soviet fast tanks, infantry tanks, and light tanks in service.

== Design ==
The BT tanks were "convertible tanks". This was a feature that was designed by J. Walter Christie to reduce wear of the unreliable tank tracks of the 1930s. In about thirty minutes, the crew could remove the tracks and engage a chain drive to the rearmost road wheel on each side, allowing the tank to travel at very high speeds on roads. In wheeled mode, the tank was steered by pivoting the front road wheels. According to historical researches, this feature may have been required by Stalin for planned European warfare within a strategy similar to blitzkrieg. However, Soviet tank forces soon found the convertible option of little practical use; in a country with few paved roads, it consumed space and added needless complexity and weight. The feature was dropped from later Soviet designs.

Christie, a race car mechanic and driver from New Jersey had failed to convince the U.S. Army Ordnance Bureau to adopt his Christie tank design. In 1930, Soviet agents at Amtorg, ostensibly a Soviet trade organization, used their New York political contacts to persuade U.S. military and civilian officials to provide plans and specifications of the Christie tank to the Soviet Union. At least two of Christie's M1931 tanks (without turrets) were later purchased in the United States and sent to the Soviet Union under false documentation, in which they were described as "agricultural tractors". Both tanks were delivered to the Kharkov Komintern Locomotive Plant (KhPZ). The original Christie tanks were designated fast tanks by the Soviets, abbreviated to BT (later referred to as BT-1). Based both on them and on other plans obtained earlier, three unarmed BT-2 prototypes were completed in October 1931 and mass production began in 1932. Most BT-2s were equipped with a 37 mm B-3 (5-K) gun and a machine gun, but a shortage of 37 mm guns led to some early examples being fitted with three machine guns. The sloping front hull (glacis plate) armor design of the Christie M1931 prototype was retained in later Soviet tank hull designs, later adopted for side armor as well. The BT-5 and later models were equipped with 45 mm guns.

== Variants ==
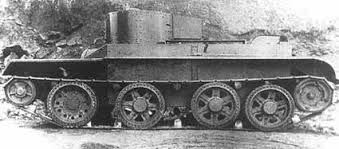
BT-6

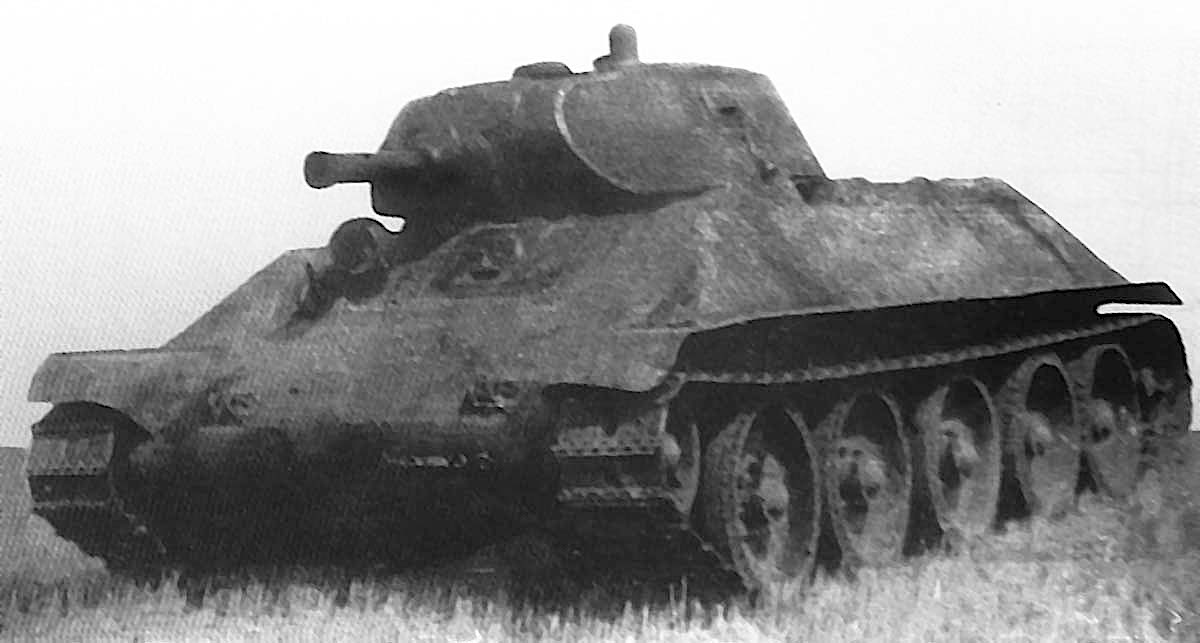
A-32 prototype undergoing tests in 1939. Notice 76.2 mm L-10 gun and the presence of five road wheels.

=== Soviet Union ===
==== BT-1 to BT-4 ====
- BT-1: Christie prototype with no turret
- BT-2 Model 1932: M-5-400 engine (copy of U.S. Liberty L-12 engine); three turret versions were produced: with single 37 mm B-3 (5-K) (60); 37 mm gun and one DT machine gun (148); twin DP machine guns in place of gun and a single DT machine gun (412). In late 1932, modified to BT-3 but produced under the same designation.
  - BT-2-IS: prototype with three-axle drive, rejected due to complexity.
- BT-3: same as BT-2, produced according to metric system (instead of the Imperial system as used for the BT-2). In official documentation referred to as BT-2.
- BT-4: was a design with welded hull and minor changes in the suspension. Three prototypes produced (with partially riveted hulls). A fake "variant" with two machine gun turrets of early T-26 can be found captioned as BT-4, but it has never existed and images are edited.

==== BT-5 ====
- BT-5: larger cylindrical turret, 45 mm 20-K gun, coaxial DT machine gun. Earlier tanks used simpler fully cylindrical bolted turrets with rear bustle welded on.
- BT-5PKh: snorkelling variant (prototypes only)
- BT-5A: artillery support version with 76.2 mm howitzer (prototypes only)
- RBT-5: rocket launcher artillery version, equipped with two 420 mm tank torpedoes (prototypes only)
- BT-5 flamethrower tank (prototypes only)
- BT-5-IS: prototype with three-axle drive, rejected due to complexity. In 1938 the same prototype was upgraded with sloped side plates, leading to development of BT-SV-2.
- PT-1A: amphibious variant with new hull (prototypes only)
- TT-BT-5: teletank, remote-radio-controlled tank (prototypes only)
- Tsyganov's BT: a "very fast" version of BT-5 by N. F. Tsyganov, which had a set of 30 wheels connected by a chain. It was supposed to reach up to 105 km/h, but was rejected due to complexity and only one mock-up was built
- BT-6: BT-5 with fully welded hull, predecessor of BT-7 (prototype)

==== BT-7 ====
- BT-7 Model 1935: welded hull, redesigned hull front, new Mikulin M-17T engine (licensed copy of a BMW engine), enclosed muffler, new short-pitch tracks
- BT-7 Model 1937: new turret with sloping armour
- BT-7TU: command version, with whip antenna instead of earlier frame antenna
- BT-7A: artillery support version with a 76.2 mm howitzer in larger turret similar to one of T-28. 155 were intended to be made, but of them 21 were finished with normal BT-7 turrets and one lacked a cannon, this particular tank was later used for testing 76.2 mm L-11 and F-32 cannons.
- OP-7: flame-thrower version with external fuel panniers (prototype only)
- TT-BT-7: teletank, remote-radio-controlled tank (prototype only)
- BT-SV-2 Cherepakha ("turtle"): another prototype, this took armour sloping to an extreme
- BT-7M (1938, prototypes designated A-8; sometimes referred to as BT-8): new V-2 diesel engine replacing earlier gasoline engines.

==== A-20/A-32 ====
- A-20 (also known as BT-20): prototype for a new BT tank, with 20 mm extremely sloped armour inspired by BT-SV-2 prototype, 45 mm 20-K gun, model V-2 diesel engine. Lost out in trials to the tracked-only A-32. The only built prototype is known to have participated in the Battle of Moscow. In 1941, as the Germans neared Moscow, the situation was so desperate that everything battle-worthy was put into service by the Soviets. The A-20 prototype, which at that time was at Kubinka army proving ground near Moscow for evaluation trials, was immediately put into service together with other prototypes of tanks present here, which were organized into a separate company led by Captain Semenov. Later on, the tank was included in the 22nd Tank Brigade organic, together with its predecessors and successors, BT-7 and T-34 tanks. On 1 December 1941, during fighting, the tank was seriously damaged and sent to the rear for repairs. Three days later, it re-entered service with the 22nd Tank Brigade until mid-December, when the tank was again damaged and evacuated to the rear. After these events, its fate is unknown.
- A-32 (A-20G): initially known as the A-20G (G - tracked) and then renamed to A-32, it was the competitor to the A-20. The wheels-and-tracks system was removed for the first time from the BT tanks series, making the tank design and production easier, more reliable and, especially, lighter; in fact, armor was increased to 30 mm, hull was enlarged, 5th road wheel was fitted in for better ground-pressure distribution and the 45 mm 20-K gun was replaced by the 76.2 mm L-10 gun, but the weight increased by only 1 ton (from 18 to 19 tons, respectively for the A-20 and A-32). Trials in 1939 showed that the tank armor could be upgraded and thus a request for increase to 45 mm was made. A second prototype was specially created for the purpose, this time equipped with turret and 45 mm armament from the A-20 and with additional weights placed on special brackets welded on the hull and turret to simulate mass of the up-armored tank. After satisfactory tests, other requests were made, for example to improve the visibility from inside the tank and to adopt the newer F-32 gun (later the L-11 and F-34 were adopted on prototypes and production models instead), which finally lead to the A-34, serial produced as the famous T-34.

=== Foreign variants ===
- BT-42: Finnish assault gun; captured BT-7s were equipped with British QF 4.5-inch howitzers. The co-axial DT gun was removed and turret re-designed to accommodate the new gun. Only 18 were made.
- BT-43: Finnish armoured personnel carrier; captured BT-7 equipped with troop accommodation. Only one prototype was made.

== Specifications ==
Comparison of the BT-2, BT-5, BT-7, BT-7A, and BT-8
| | BT-2 | BT-5 | BT-7 | BT-7A | BT-7M (BT-8) |
| number built | 620 | 2,108 or 5000 | 4,965 or 2000 | 154 | 790 |
| crew | 3 | 3 | 3 | 3 | 3 |
| weight | 10.2 t | 11.5 t | 14 t | 14.5 t | 14.7 t |
| length | 5.58 m | 5.58 m | 5.66 m | 5.66 m | 5.66 m |
| width | 2.23 m | 2.23 m | 2.29 m | 2.29 m | 2.29 m |
| height | 2.20 m | 2.25 m | 2.42 m | 2.52 m | 2.42 m |
| armour | 6–13 mm | 6–13 mm | 6–13 mm | 6–13 mm | 6–22 mm |
| main gun | 37 mm Model 30 | 45 mm Model 32 | 45 mm Model 34 | 76.2 mm Model 27/32 | 45 mm Model 32/38 |
| main gun ammunition | 96 rounds | 115 rounds | 146 rounds | 50 rounds | 146 rounds |
| machine guns | DT | DT | DT | 2×DT | 3×DT |
| engine power model | 400 hp M-5 | 400 hp M-5 | 500 hp M-17T | 500 hp M-17T | 450 hp V-2 |
| fuel | 400 L gasoline | 360 L gasoline | 620 L gasoline | 620 L gasoline | 620+170 L diesel |
| road speed (on wheels) | 100 km/h (62 mph) or 72 km/h (45mph) | 72km/h | 86 km/h (53 mph) | 86 km/h | 86 km/h |
| road speed (on tracks) | 52 km/h (32 mph) | 52 km/h | 52 km/h | | 62 km/h (38.5 mph) |
| power:weight | 39 hp/t | 35 hp/t | 36 hp/t | 34 hp/t | 31 hp/t |
| road range | 300 km | 200 km | 250 km | 250 km | 400 km |
| tactical range | 100 km | 90 km | 120 km | 120 km | 230 km |

== Combat history ==
BT tanks saw service in the Second Sino-Japanese War, Spanish Civil War, Battles of Khalkhin Gol (also known as the Nomohan Incident), the Winter War in Finland, and in World War II.

=== Spanish Civil War ===
In the Spanish Civil War (1936–1939), a regiment of 50 BT-5's fought on the Republican side. They were manned by the members International Brigades trained in USSR and by some Soviet tankists. Their first combat on 13 October 1937 during the Zaragoza Offensive was disastrous: 19 of the 48 tanks, and one third of their crews were killed or wounded, due to bad planning by the Spanish Second Republic.Later, 12 more were lost from December 1937 to February 1938 during the Battle of Teruel. A few captured BT-5s were also used by the Nationalist side.

=== Chinese service ===
The Chinese Nationalist Army had four BT-5s which fought against the Imperial Japanese Army during the Second Sino-Japanese War (1937–1945).

=== Battles of Khalkin Gol ===
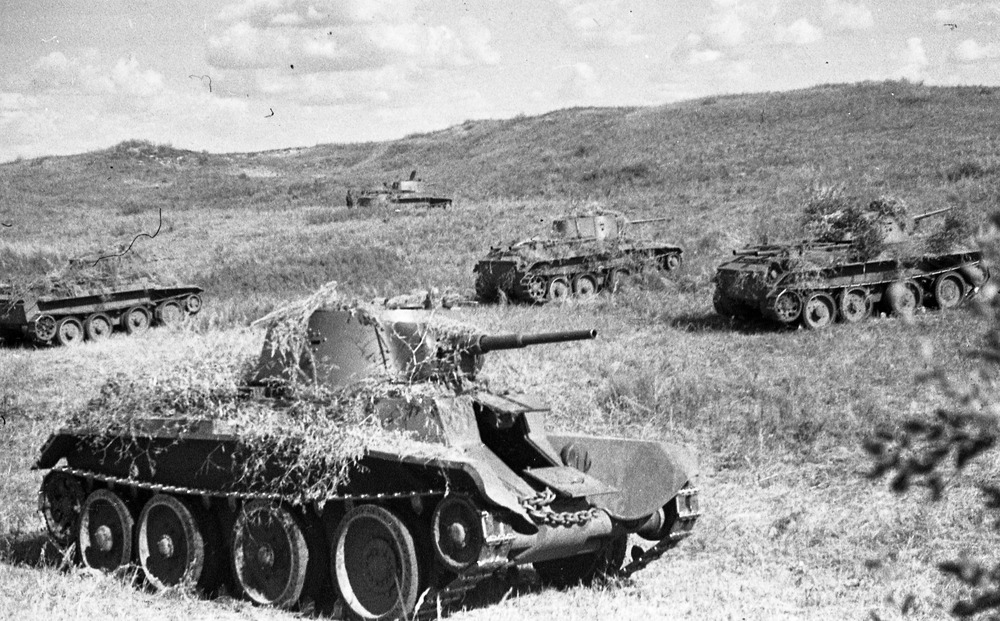
BT-7 tanks in the Battle of Khalkhin Gol

During the Battles of Khalkhin Gol (also known as the Nomonhan Incident), which lasted from May to September in 1939, BT tanks were easily attacked by Japanese "close quarter" teams (tank killer squads) which were – in lieu of anti-tank weapons – armed with petrol (gasoline) bottles (later called "Molotov cocktails"). The BT-5s and BT-7s, operating in temperatures greater than 100 °F (38 °C) on the Mongolian plains, easily caught fire when a Molotov cocktail ignited their gasoline engines. General Georgy Zhukov made it one of his "points" when briefing Joseph Stalin, that his "...BT tanks were a bit fireprone...." Conversely, many Japanese tank crews held the Soviet 45mm gun of the BT-5 and BT-7 in high esteem, noting, "...no sooner did they see the flash from a Russian gun, than they'd notice a hole in their tank, adding that the Soviet gunners were accurate too!"

After the Battles of Khalkhin Gol, the Soviet military broke into two camps; one side was represented by Spanish Civil War veterans General Pavel Rychagov of the Soviet Air Force, Soviet armour expert General Dimitry Pavlov, and Stalin's favorite, Marshal Grigory Kulik, Chief of Artillery Administration. The other side consisted of the Khalkhin Gol veterans led by Generals Zhukov and Grigory Kravchenko of the Soviet Air Force. The lessons of Russia's "first real war on a massive scale using tanks, artillery, and airplanes" at Khalkhin Gol went unheeded.

=== Winter War ===
During the Winter War against Finland in 1939–1940, BT-2, BT-5 and BT-7 tanks had less success against Finnish Army forces than they had against the Japanese at Khalkin Gol.

=== World War II ===
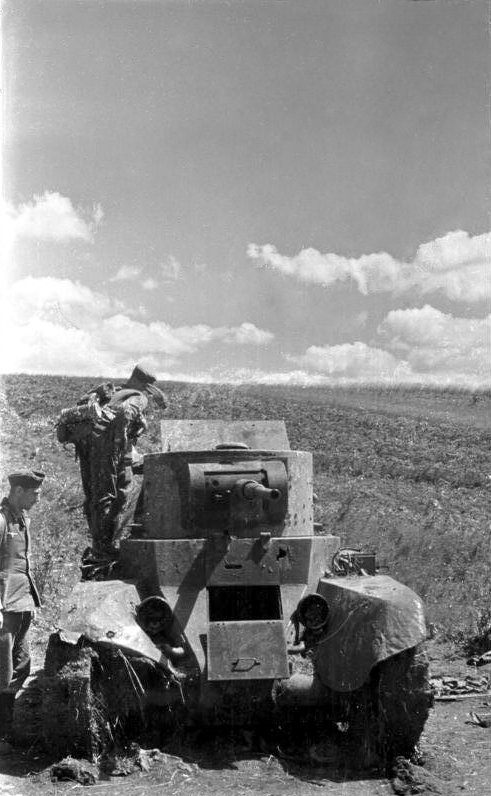
A Soviet BT-7 model 1935 destroyed during the 1941 German offensive

During the Second World War in Europe, BT-5 and BT-7 tanks were used in the 1939 Soviet invasion of Poland. The Red Army planned to replace the BT tank series with the T-34 and had just begun doing so when Operation Barbarossa, the German invasion of the Soviet Union, began on 22 June 1941.

BT-series tanks took part in large numbers in the battles that followed during 1941, during which thousands were abandoned or destroyed. To explain the catastrophe, communist historians labelled them obsolete and until the collapse of the Soviet Union, the number of Soviet tanks was never officially named. A few remained in use in 1942, but rarely saw combat against German forces after that time.

During the final weeks of World War II, a significant number of BT-7 tanks took part in the Soviet invasion of Manchuria in August 1945, seeing combat against Japanese occupation forces in Northeast China. This was the last combat action for the BT tanks.

== Operators ==
- Soviet Union – main operator
- Kingdom of Afghanistan
- (Republic of China (1912–1949)) /Republic of China (1912–1949) – 30 BT-5s
- Chinese Soviet Republic / / Soviet Zone
- Finland – captured
- Kingdom of Romania – captured BT-2s and BT-7s
- Kingdom of Hungary – captured
- Nazi Germany – captured
- Mongolian People's Republic – 15 BT-7
- Second Spanish Republic – 50 BT-5 bought in late 1937 and used during Spanish Civil War
- Francoist Spain – captured from Second Spanish Republic

== Technical legacy ==
The BT tank series was numerous, forming the cavalry tank arm of the Red Army in the 1930s and had much better mobility than other contemporary tank designs. For these reasons, there were many experiments and derivatives of the design, mostly conducted at the KhPZ factory in Kharkov.

The most important legacy of the BT tank was the T-34 medium tank. In 1937, a new design team was formed at the KhPZ to create the next generation of BT tanks. Initially, the chief designer was Mikhail Koshkin and after his death, Morozov. The team built two prototypes. The light one was called the A-20. The more heavily armed and armoured BT derivative, the A-32, was a "universal tank" to replace all the T-26 infantry tanks, BT cavalry tanks and T-28 medium tanks. Such a plan was controversial, but concerns about tank performance under the threat of the German blitzkrieg led to the approval for production of a still more heavily armoured version, the T-34 medium tank.

Along the way, an important technical development was the BT-IS and BT-SW-2 testbed vehicles, concentrating on sloped armour. This proof-of-concept led directly to the armour layout of the T-34. BT tank chassis were also used as the basis for engineering support vehicles and mobility testing vehicles. A bridgelayer variant had a T-38 turret and launched a bridge across small gaps. Standard tanks were fitted as fascine carriers. The RBT-5 hosted a pair of large artillery rocket launchers, one on each side of the turret. Several designs for extremely wide tracks, including, oddly, wooden 'snowshoes' were tried on BT tanks.

The KBT-7 was a thoroughly modern armoured command vehicle that was in the prototype stage when World War II broke out. The design was not pursued during the war.

In the Kiev manoeuvres of 1936, foreign military observers were shown hundreds of BT tanks roll by a reviewing stand. In the audience were British Army representatives, who returned home to advocate for use of Christie suspension on British cruiser tanks, which they incorporated from the Cruiser Mk III onwards. The pointed shape of the hull front armor on the BT tank also influenced the design of the British Matilda tank.

== Sources ==
- Chamberlain, Peter; Ellis, Chris (1972). Tanks of The World. London: Cassell. ISBN 978-0-304-36141-0.
- Coox, Alvin (1985). Nomonhan; Japan Against Russia, 1939. 2 volumes. Stanford, CA: Stanford University Press. ISBN 978-0-8047-1160-9.
- Goldman, Stuart D. (2012). Nomonhan, 1939; The Red Army's Victory That Shaped World War II. Annapolis, MD: Naval Institute Press. ISBN 978-1-59114-329-1.
- Zaloga, Steven J.; Grandsen, James (1984). Soviet Tanks and Combat Vehicles of World War Two. London: Arms and Armour Press. ISBN 978-0-85368-606-4.
- Zaloga, Steven J. (25 August 2016). BT Fast Tank: The Red Army's Cavalry Tank 1931–45. New Vanguard 237. ISBN 9781472810656.
