= Fast tank =

Fast tank may refer to:

- Cruiser tank, the British interwar concept of mechanized cavalry and its designs
- BT tank, the Soviet fast light tank
