= BT-42 =

Finnish assault gun

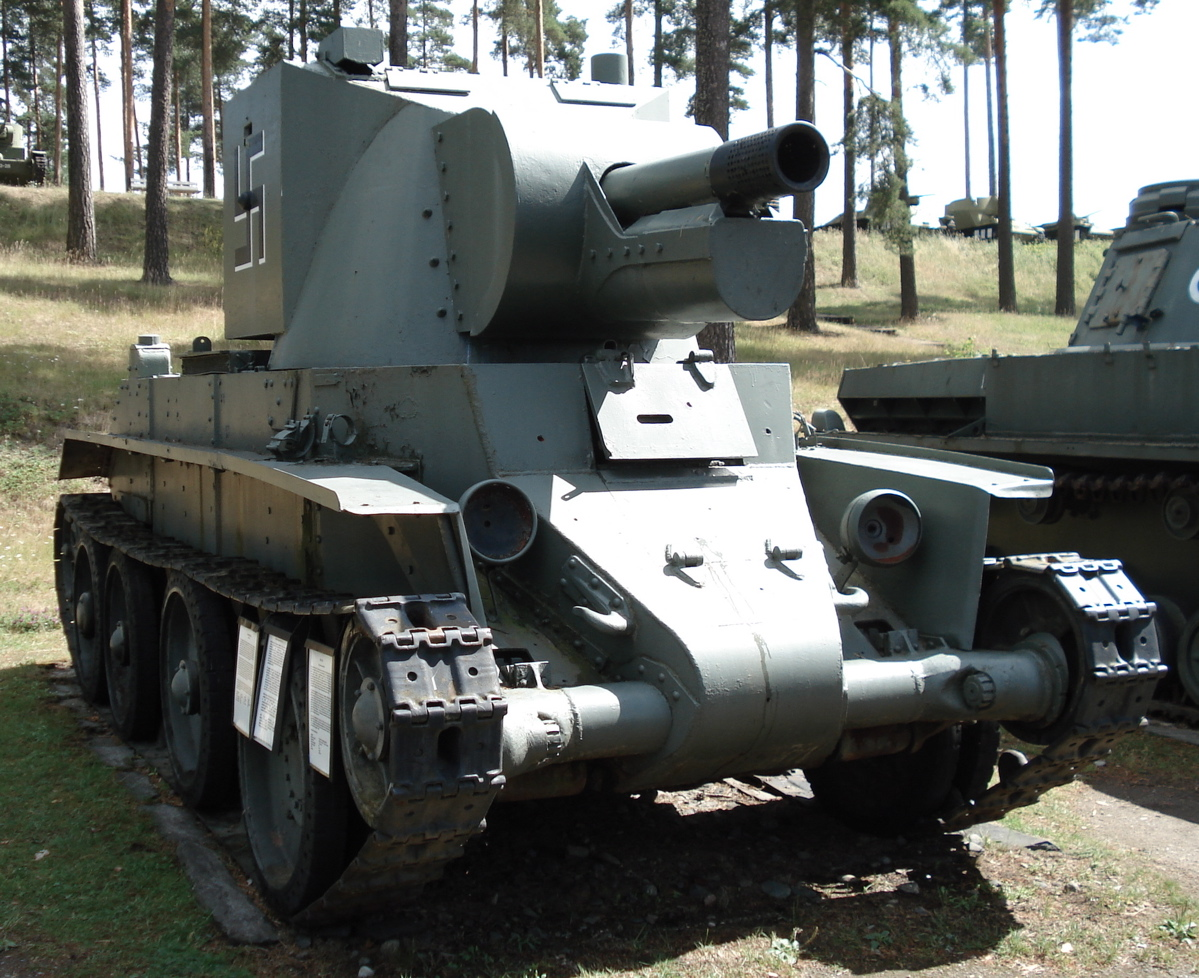
- BT-42 at the Parola Tank Museum
- Type: Assault gun
- Place of origin: Finland

Service history
- In service: 1943–1944
- Used by: Finland
- Wars: Continuation War

Production history
- Produced: 1942
- No. built: 18
- Variants: BT-43

Specifications
- Mass: 15 tonnes
- Length: 5.7 m (18 ft 8 in)
- Width: 2.1 m (6 ft 11 in)
- Height: 2.7 m (8 ft 10 in)
- Crew: 3
- Armor: 6-16 mm
- Main armament: 114 mm (4.5-inch) howitzer (50 rounds)
- Engine: Mikulin M-17T V-12 gasoline engine 500 hp (370 kW)
- Power/weight: 33.33 hp/tonne
- Suspension: Christie
- Ground clearance: 0.31 m
- Operational range: 375 km (233 mi)
- Maximum speed: 53 km/h (33 mph)

The BT-42 was a Finnish assault gun, constructed during the Continuation War. It was constructed from captured Soviet BT-7 light tanks and British 4.5-inch howitzers (114 mm-calibre light howitzer, model 1908) from 1918, which had been donated during the Winter War. Eighteen vehicles were constructed, yet only 1 survives to this day, housed at the Parola Tank Museum.

== Development and use ==
As the Second World War progressed, the Red Army were fielding better and better tanks. The Finnish Army, on the other hand, had to make do with a large number of captured tanks, which were for the most part lightly armored and armed.

The Finns decided to redesign the BT-7 Model 1937 tank. They constructed a new turret fitted with 76 K/02 gun sights and armed it with British-made 114.3 mm howitzers that had been supplied by the British during the Winter War (Q.F. 4,5 inch howitzer Mark II, also known as 114 Psv.H/18 in Finland). Eighteen BT-42 were built between 1943-1944.

These converted vehicles quickly became very unpopular with their crews. It was hard to aim, cramped and slow to load due to the separate-loaded ammunition. The weaknesses could mainly be attributed to the new turret, which apart from giving the tank a high-profile also added significant weight to the vehicle, stressing the suspension and the engine.

The BT-42 was used for the first time in 1943, at the Svir River, where it was used against enemy pillboxes. The design worked reasonably well against soft targets but was completely unsuitable for anti-tank warfare.

The BT-42 ultimately failed in its original goal of establishing a domestic armor production to combat the Soviet tanks—this being realized when the tank proved ineffective in tank-to-tank combat and later replaced with the German Stug IIIs. An order was placed for 45 Stug40 Model G assault guns in mid-1943, however, only 30 of them were delivered, in July-September of the same year.

To counter this, the Finns copied a German-designed HEAT round for the gun and it was initially thought that it would be effective against the sloped armour of the T-34. Testing showed that it could penetrate 100mm of steel plate at 50 or 60 degrees, and should be able to penetrate 110-115mm armor sloped at a 70 degree angle, but this was proven incorrect at the Battle of Viipuri where it was shown to be incapable of taking down even medium tanks. 2,000 shells were ordered but this was cancelled after 500 had been delivered. Supposedly one of the main issues was with the copied HEAT shells fuses, which apparently did not arm themselves correctly after firing, due to the different muzzle velocity and round spin rate of the 4.5-inch howitzer compared to the original German guns.

The BT-42s were used again during the major Soviet offensive in 1944. Nine BT-42s were deployed in the defense of Vyborg. In one encounter, a Finnish BT-42 hit a Soviet T-34 eighteen times, failing even to immobilize the enemy vehicle. During this battle a BT-42 was destroyed by a T-34 tank shell. Seven of the BT-42 tanks were also lost due to mechanical failures, resulting in eight of the nine deployed being destroyed. At the time Finnish armoured units were still composed mostly of older designs such as the Vickers 6-Ton, T-26 and T-28 tanks, and all of these suffered losses.

Emergency supplies of Panzer IV tanks and StuG III self-propelled assault guns, including 29 Stug 40 Model Gs and 15 PzKw IV Model Js from Germany made it possible for the Finns to replace their losses with more effective vehicles. The BT-42 was retired soon after the Vyborg battles, replaced in their role with German-made StuG IIIs. Finland also used captured T-34s, as well as receiving more of these vehicles from Germany's stock of captured enemy kits.

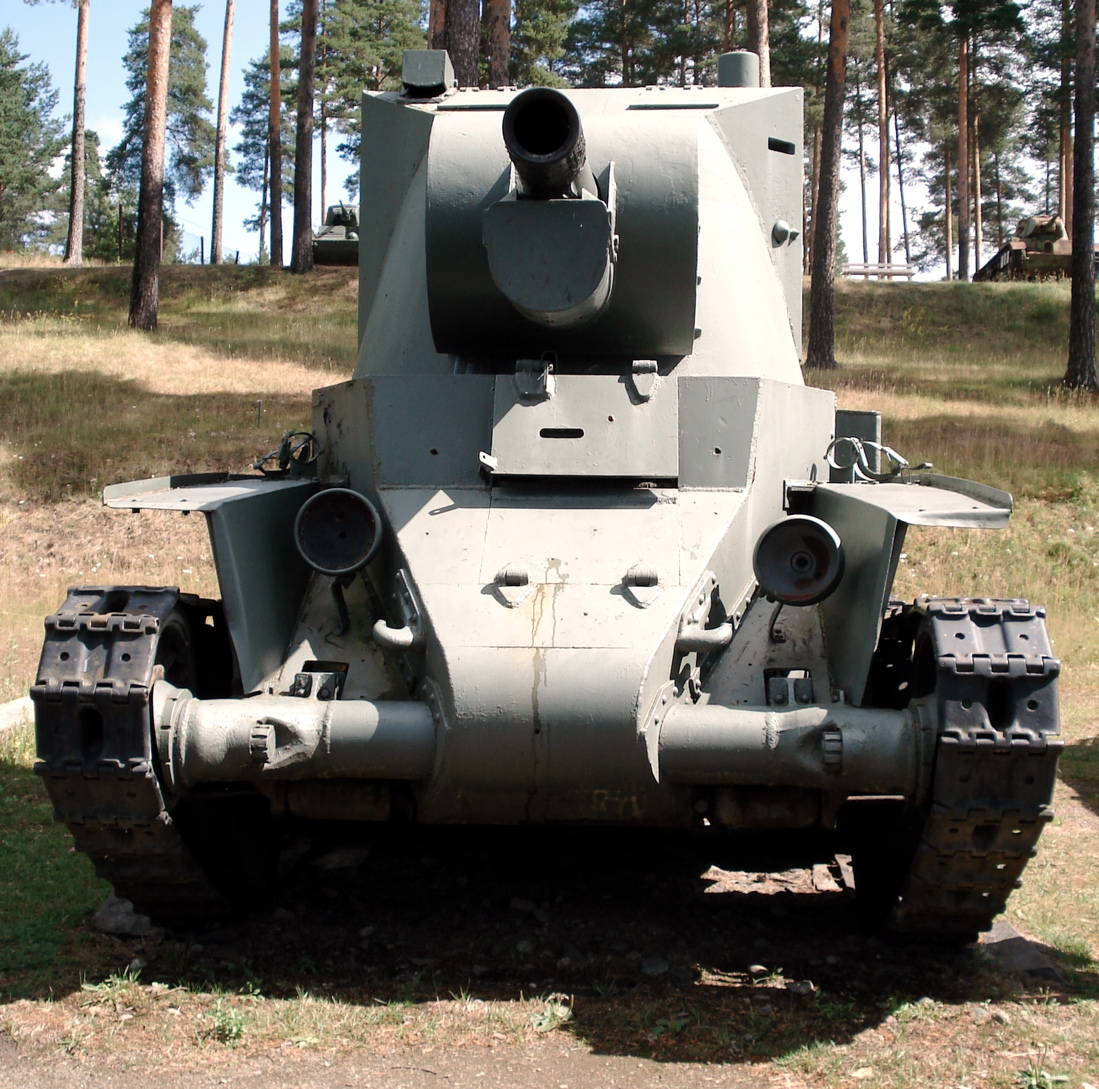
Front view

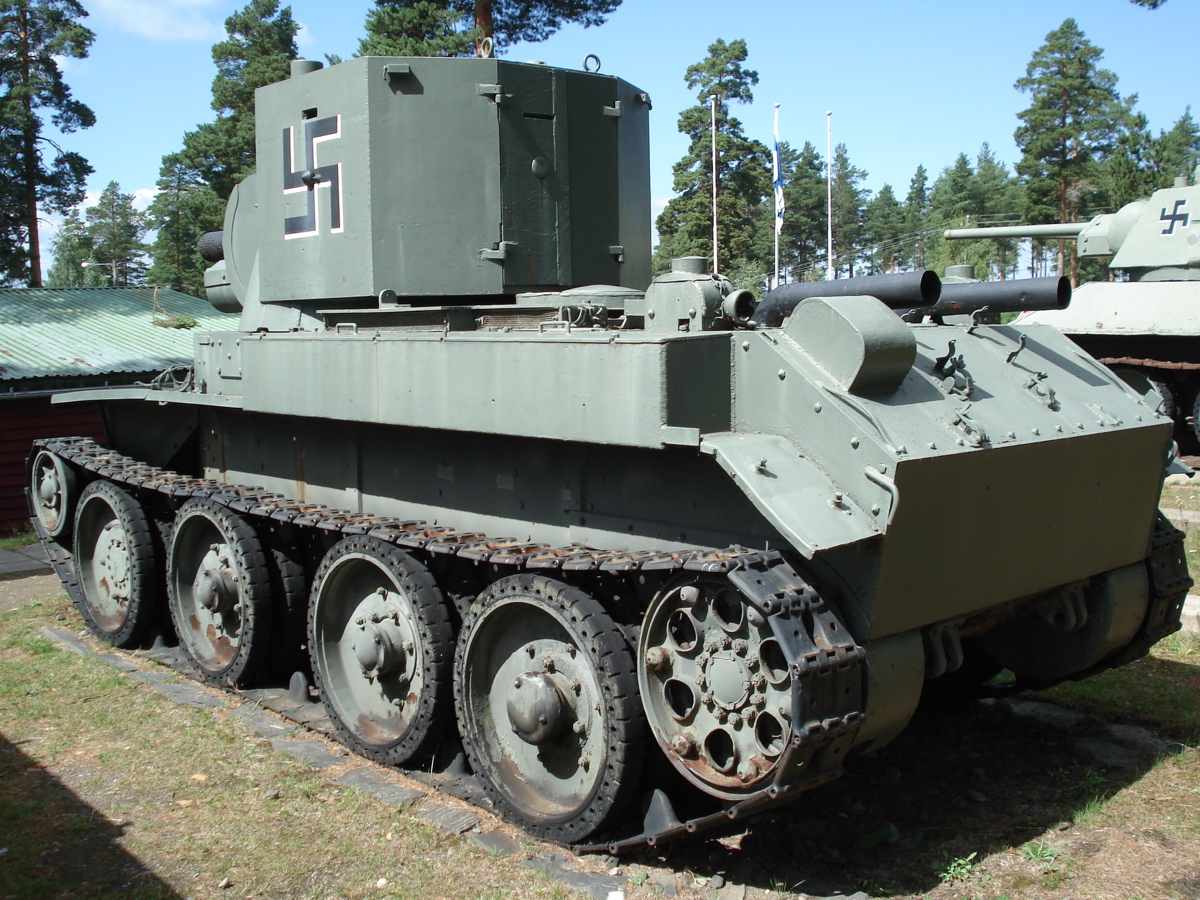
Left-rear quarter view

== In popular culture ==
The Parola Tank Museum in Parola, Finland, houses the world's last surviving BT-42. The tank was featured as the primary vehicle of Jatkosota High School, a minor school based on Finland in the Japanese anime Girls und Panzer. The museum was seeking funds for an outdoor shelter for several of their tanks, including the BT-42. A large group of Japanese Girls und Panzer fans raised over €10,000 in order to help the museum preserve its BT-42.

== See also ==
- BT-43 - another Finnish conversion of the BT-7 tank
- Beutepanzer
