= Parola Tank Museum =

- Panssarimuseo
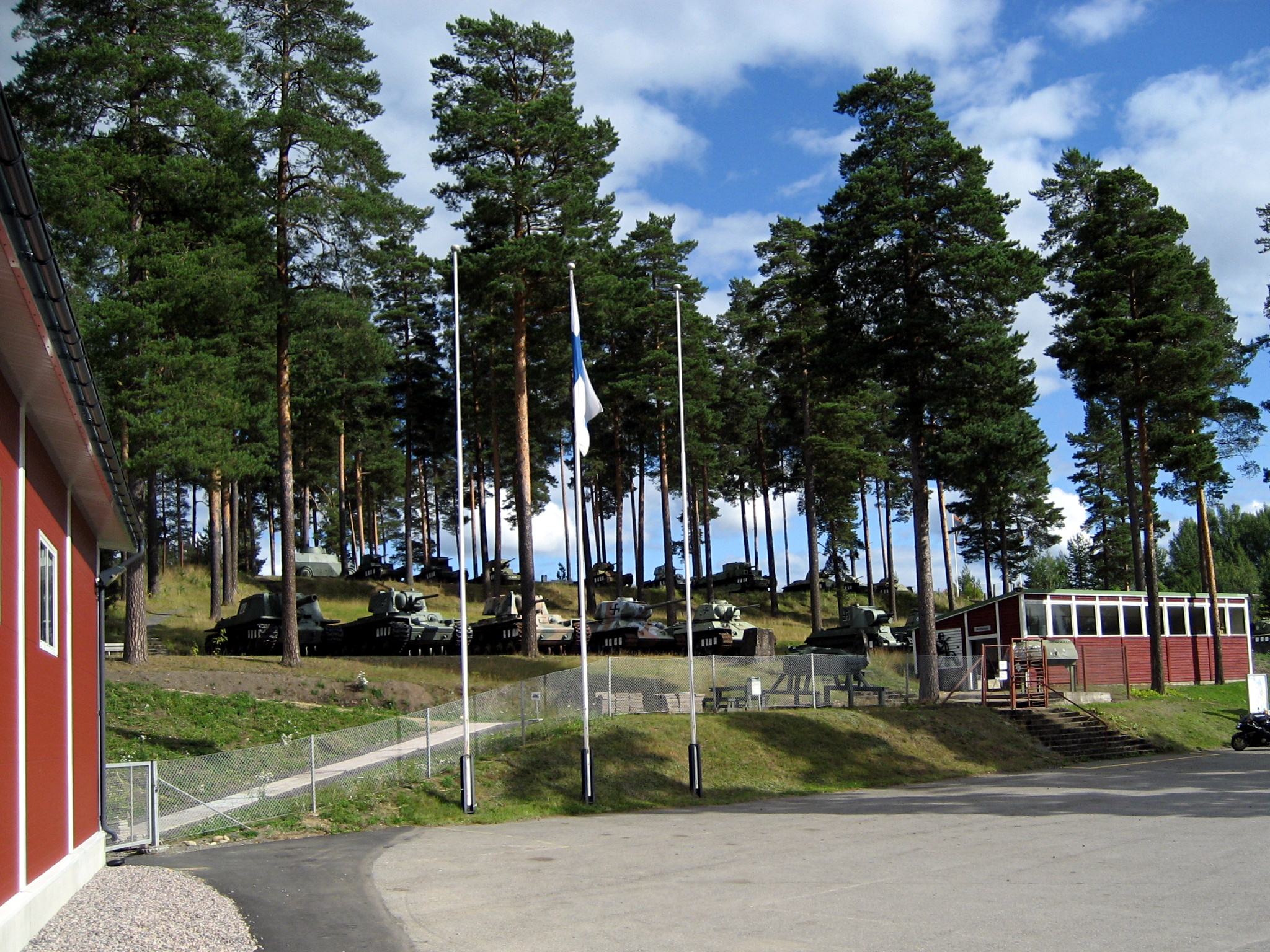
- Parola Armoured Vehicle Museum courtyard with the latest extension, Hall 2, on the left.

- Location within Finland
- Established: 18 June 1961
- Location: Parola, Finland
- Coordinates: 61°02′31″N 24°20′39″E
- Type: Military museum
- Public transit access: Parola
- Website: www.panssarimuseo.fi

Parola Tank Museum, officially Armoured Vehicle Museum and Parola Armour Museum (Finnish Panssarimuseo, Swedish Pansarmuséet) is a military museum located 110 kilometres north of Helsinki in Parola, Hattula, near Hämeenlinna, Finland, a few kilometres from the Finnish Army Armoured Brigade training unit.

The Parola Tank Museum is a branch of the Finnish Defence Forces located in Hattula, showcasing the history and equipment of armoured and anti-tank troops. The museum has an extensive collection of tanks, armoured vehicles, anti-tank weapons, and an armoured train from Finland's independence era. The museum features an anti-tank simulator. It was founded on June 18, 1961, and it attracts over 30,000 visitors annually.

The museum's exhibitions include two large heated halls displaying, among other things, tanks and military uniforms.

In 2023, the museum displayed the Tiger II, a German heavy tank, which attracted a high number of visitors.

In addition to exhibitions, the Tank Museum offers various events, such as driving demonstrations and family days, especially during the summer. The site includes a café (Tankkitupa) and a museum shop offering war history-themed souvenirs and literature.

== Full list of vehicles ==
- Renault FT
- Vickers-Carden-Loyd
- Vickers 6-ton
- T-26
- T-28
- T-50
- T-60
- T-70
- BT-42
- T-34
- T-34-85
- JSU-152
- IS-2
- KV-1
- KV-1E
- BA-20M
- BA-10
- T-20 Komsomolets
- T-54
- T-55M
- T-72M1
- ZSU-57-2
- BTR-50
- BTR-60
- BTR-80
- BMP-1
- PT-76
- Leopard 2A4
- StuG III Ausf. G
- Panzerkampfwagen IV
- FAMO
- Daimler Ferret
- Sisu armoured car
- Humber "Pig"
- M2 White
- Landsverk Anti II
- M4 Sherman
- Patria AMV
- Patria AMV AMOS
- MT-LB
- Charioteer
- Comet
- Armoured train

== Light tanks ==
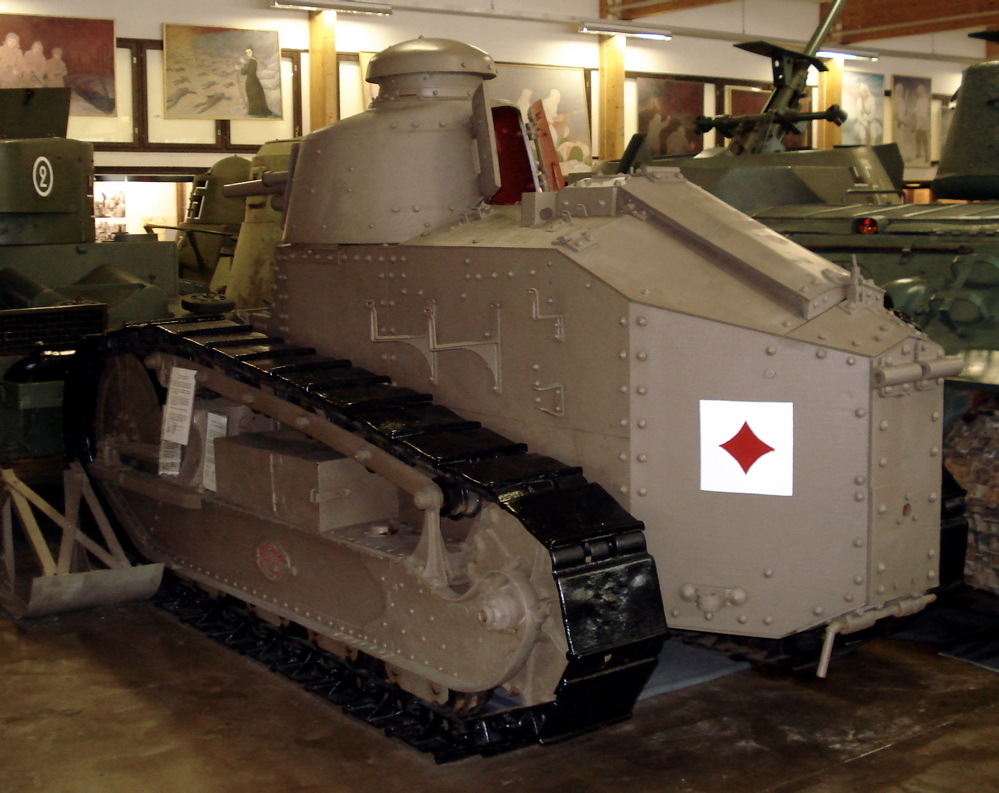
Renault FT light tank (1917)

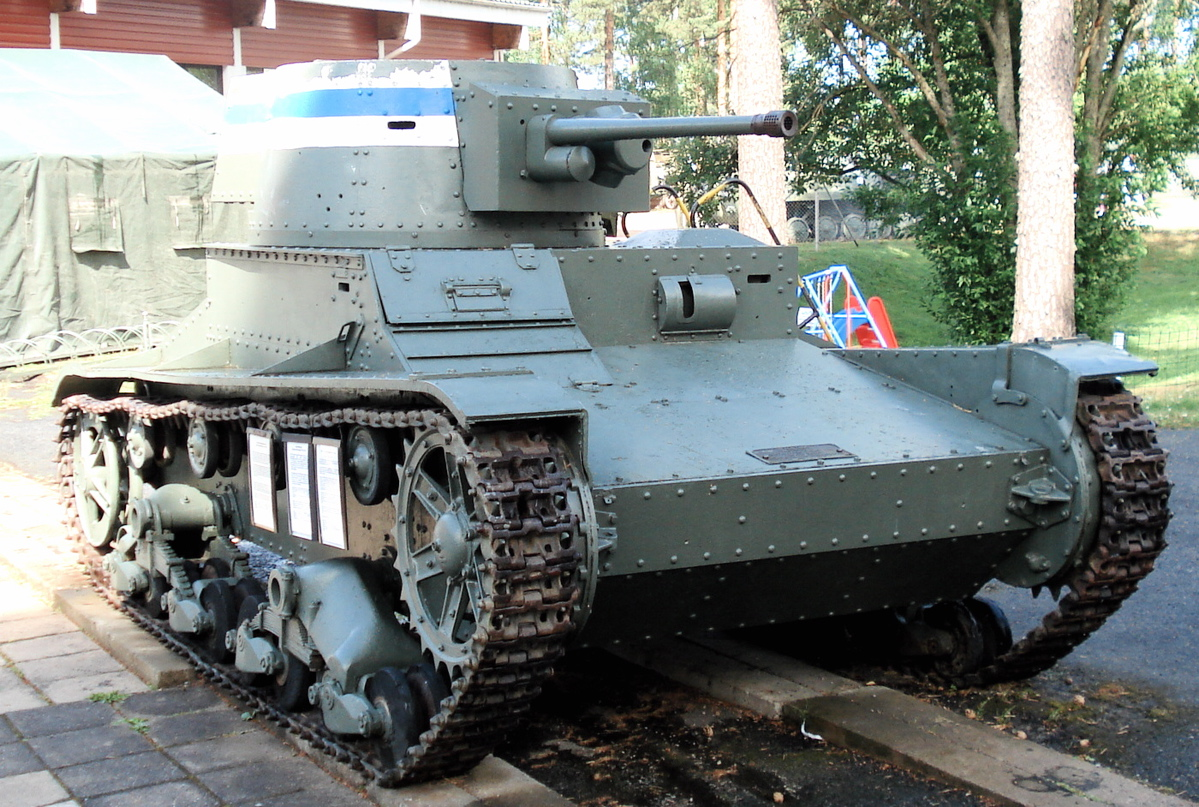
Finnish Vickers 6-ton tank with 37mm Bofors gun

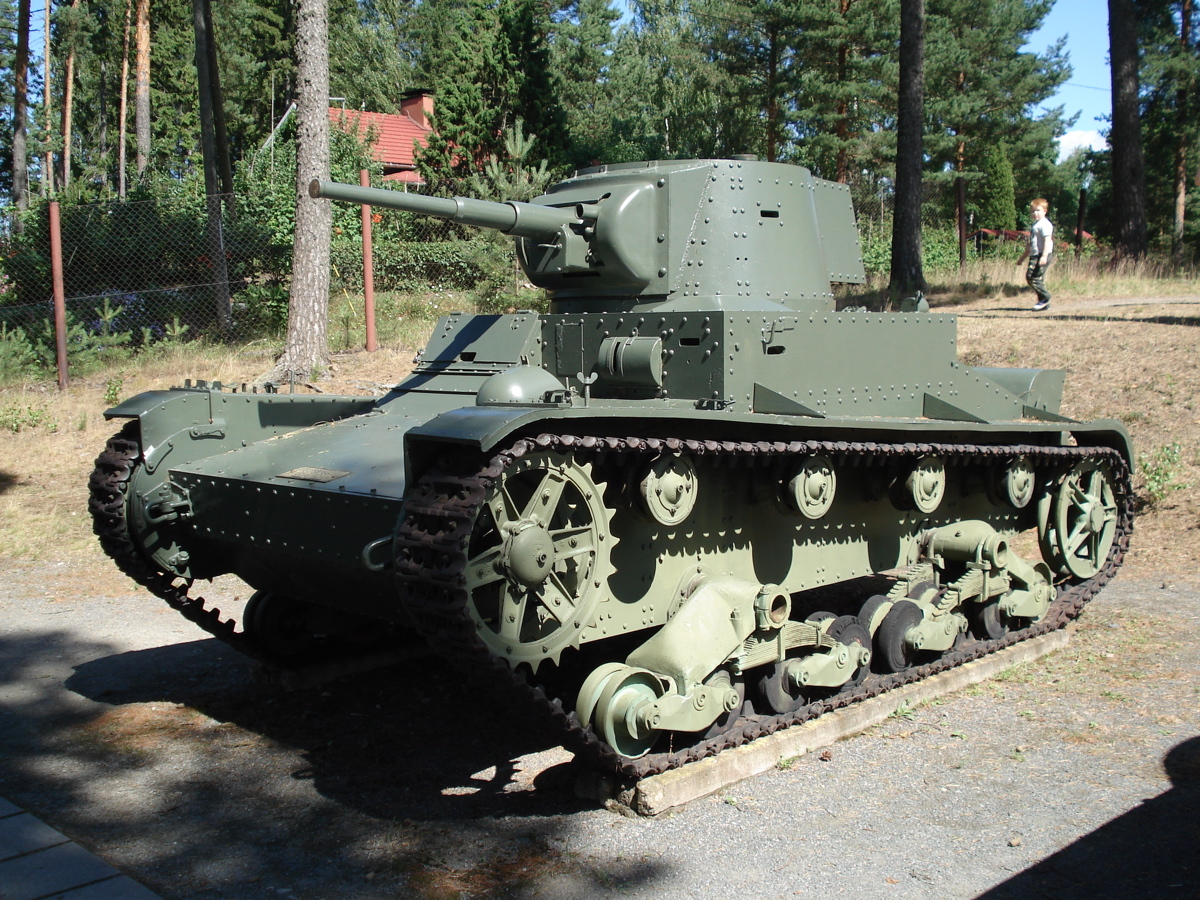
Finnish Vickers 6-ton tank (T-26E). This was upgunned during World War II with a captured Soviet 45 mm gun in a T-26 turret.

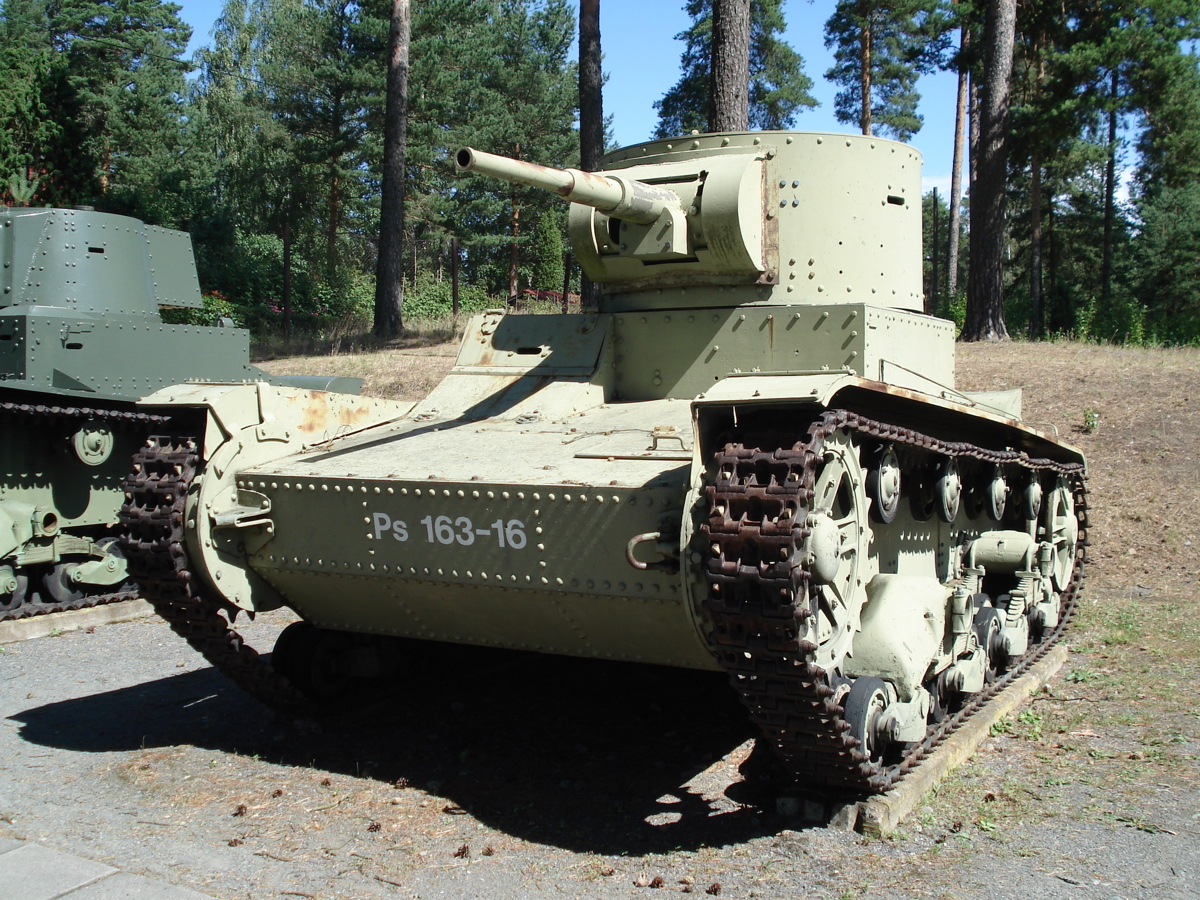
T-26, Ps.163-16

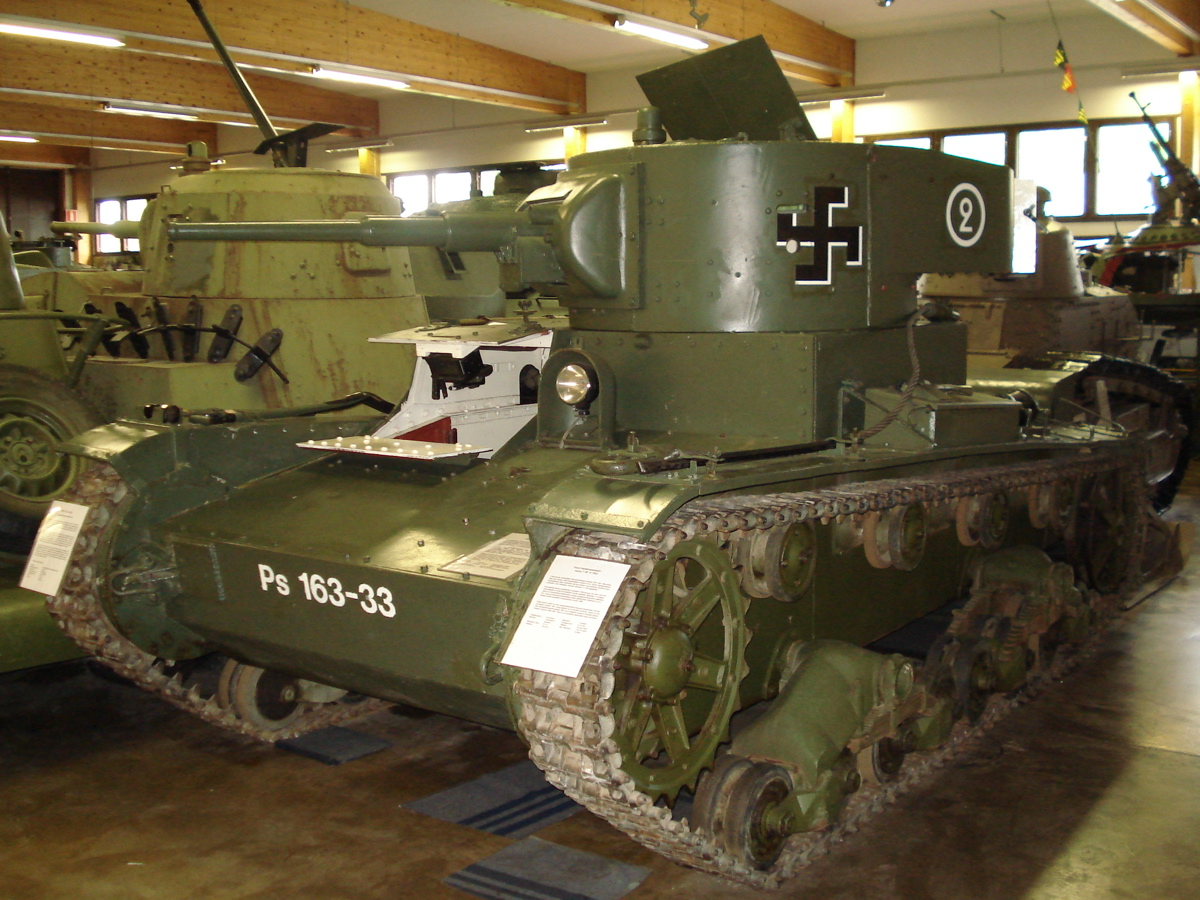
T-26, Ps.163-33

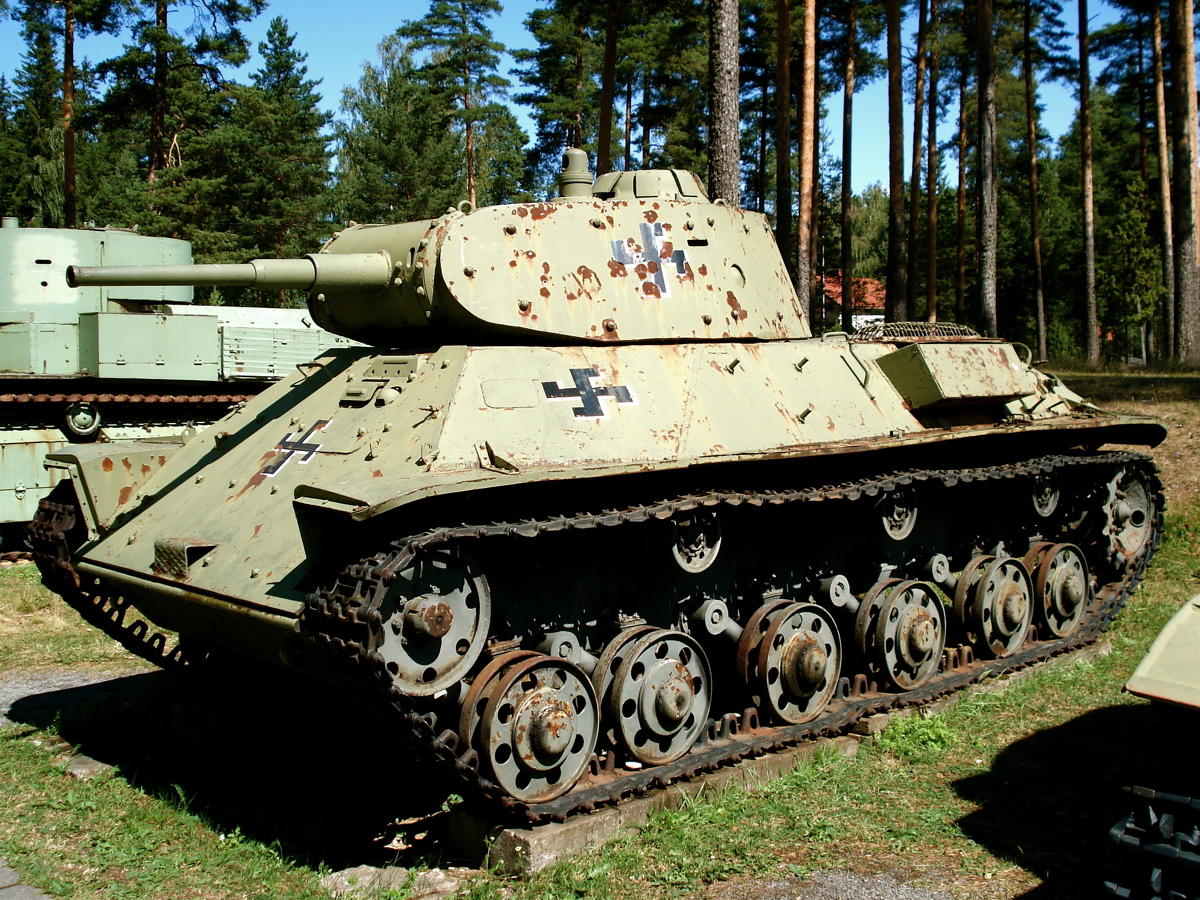
Soviet T-50

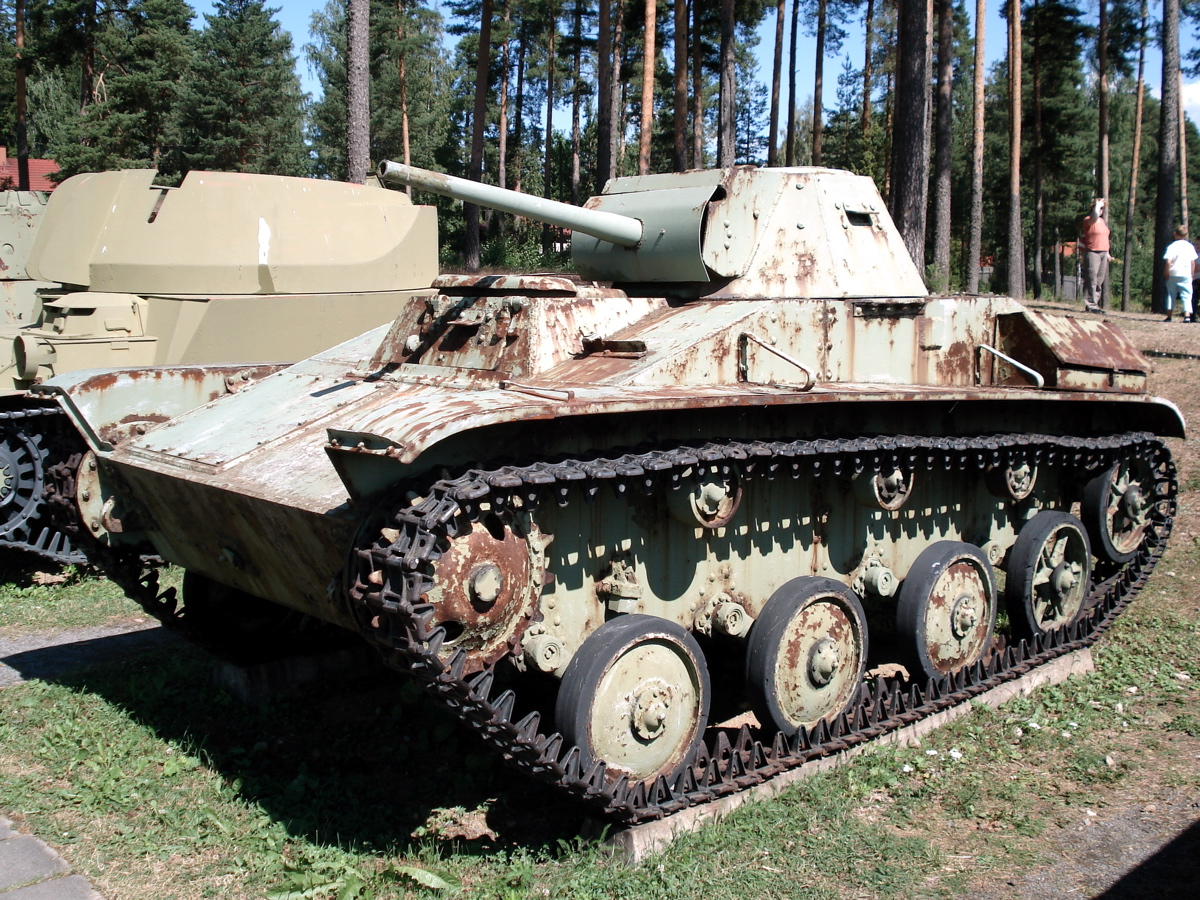
Soviet T-60

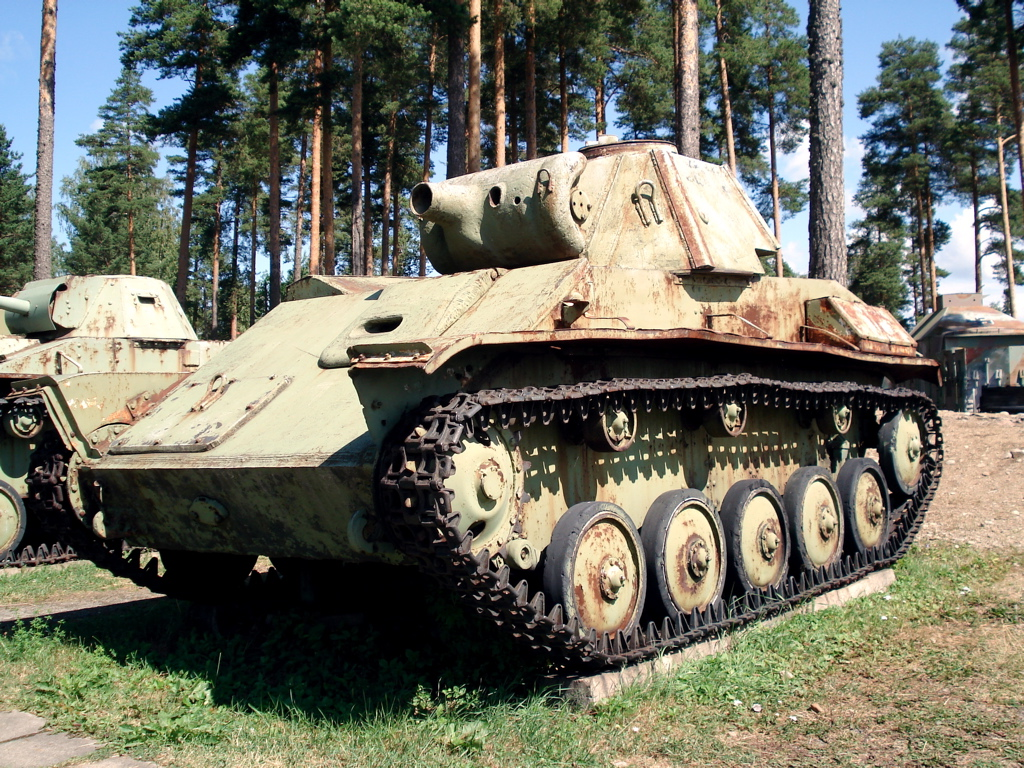
Soviet T-70

== Medium tanks ==
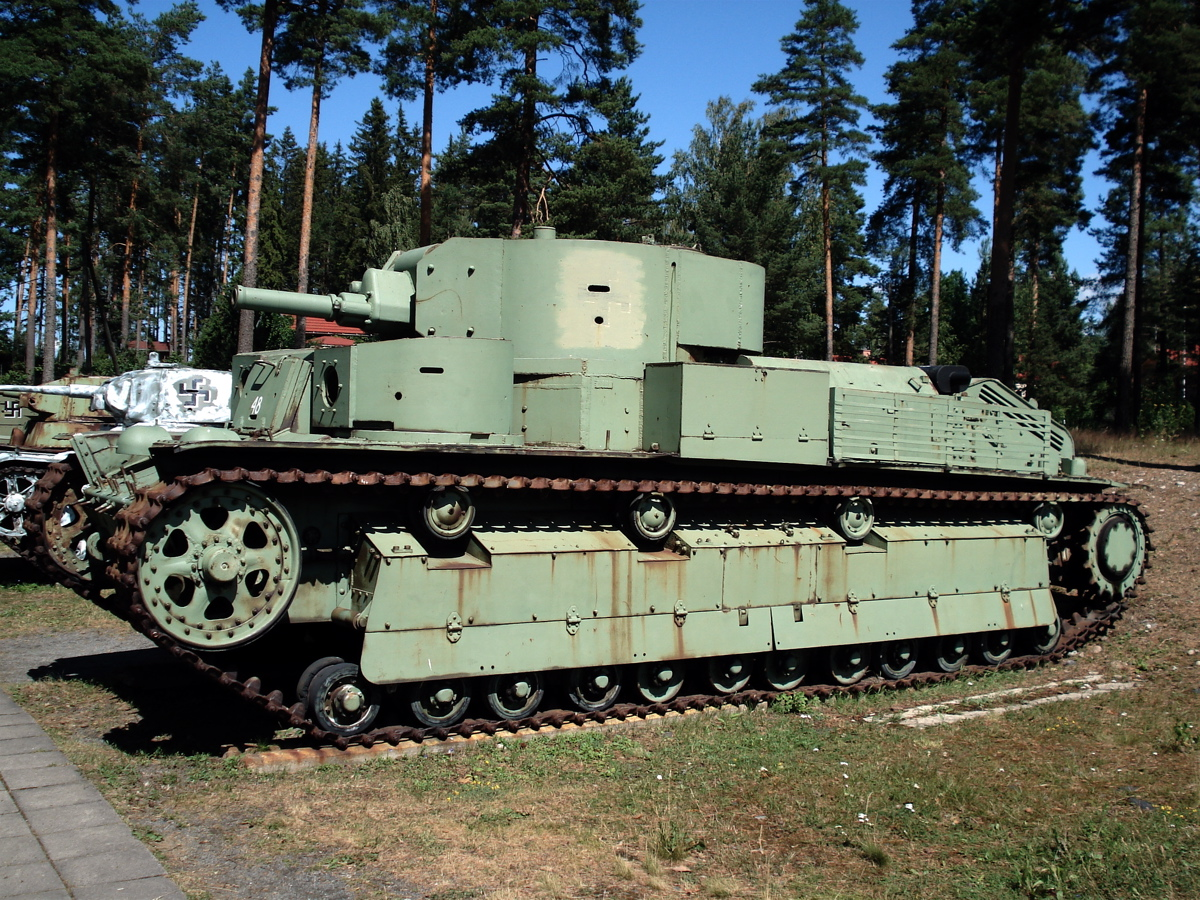
Soviet-made T-28E captured by the Finnish Defence Forces

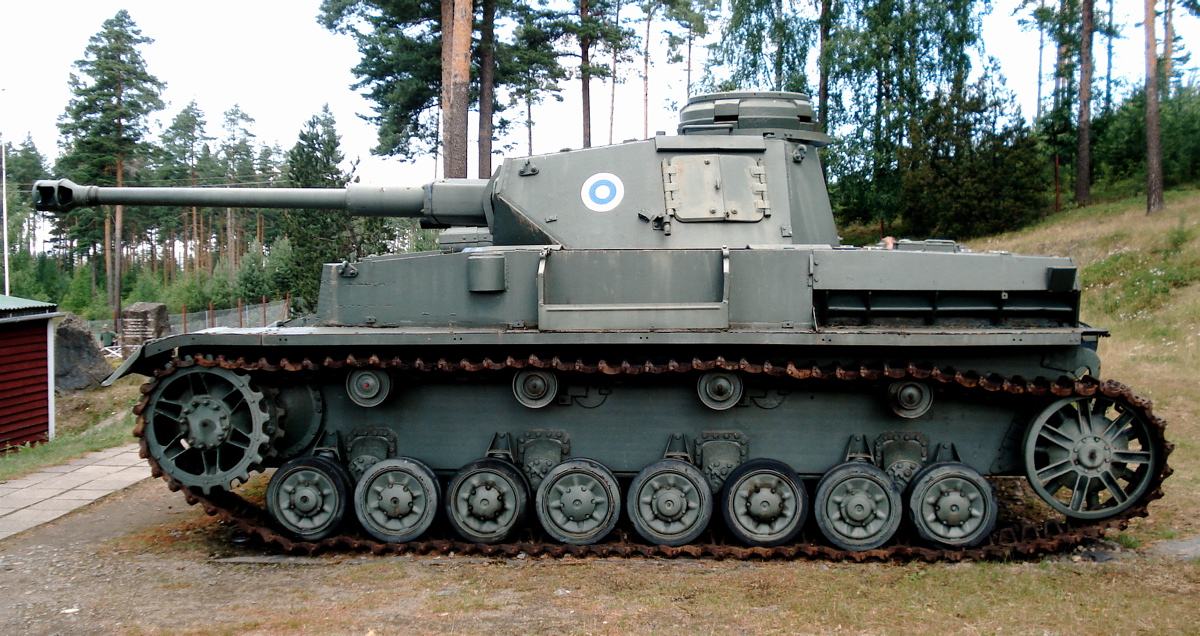
Panzerkampfwagen IV Ausf. J with Finnish roundel 1945-. Imported from Germany during WW2

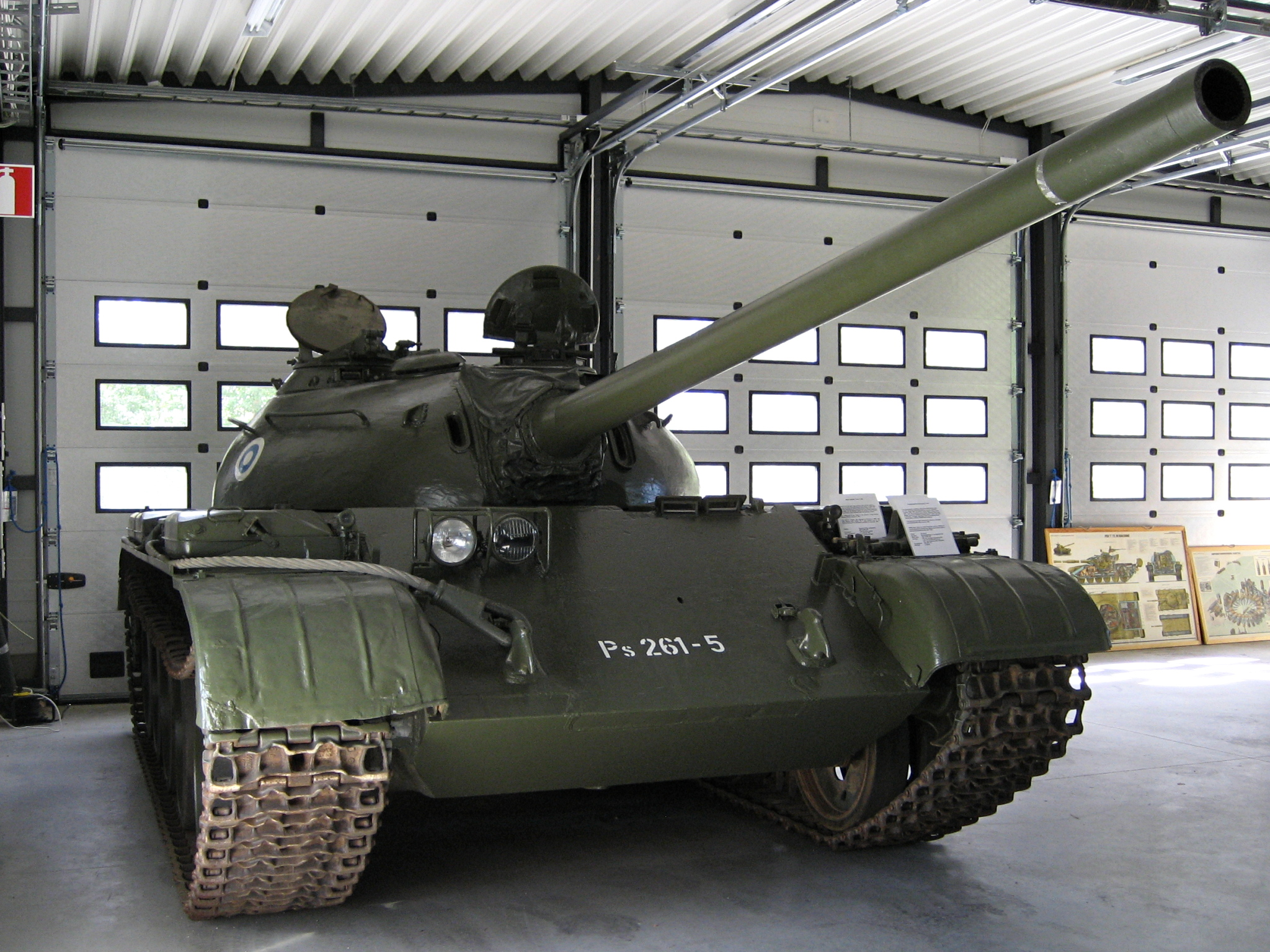
Finnish T-54

== Heavy tanks ==
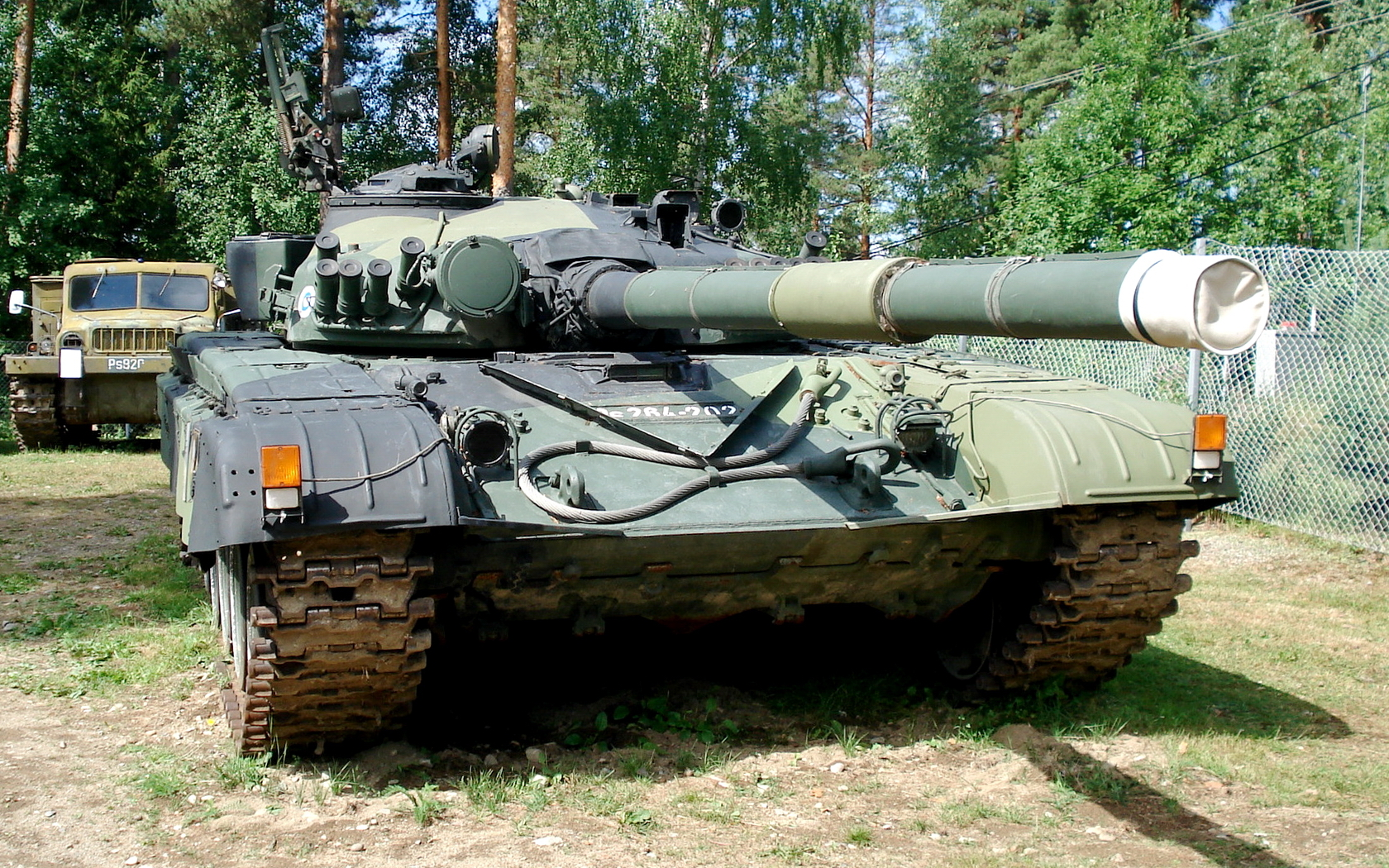
Finnish T-72M1, Ps 284-202

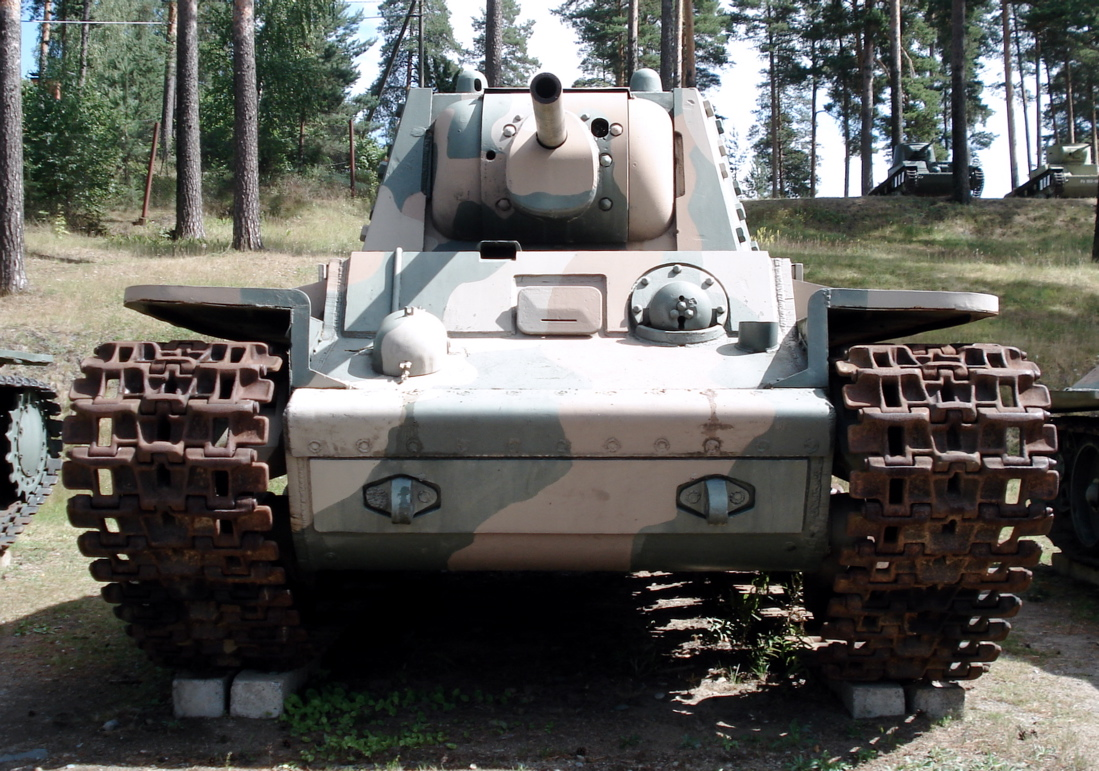
Finnish KV-1E

== Special tanks ==
- ZSU-57-2 anti-aircraft gun

== Assault guns ==
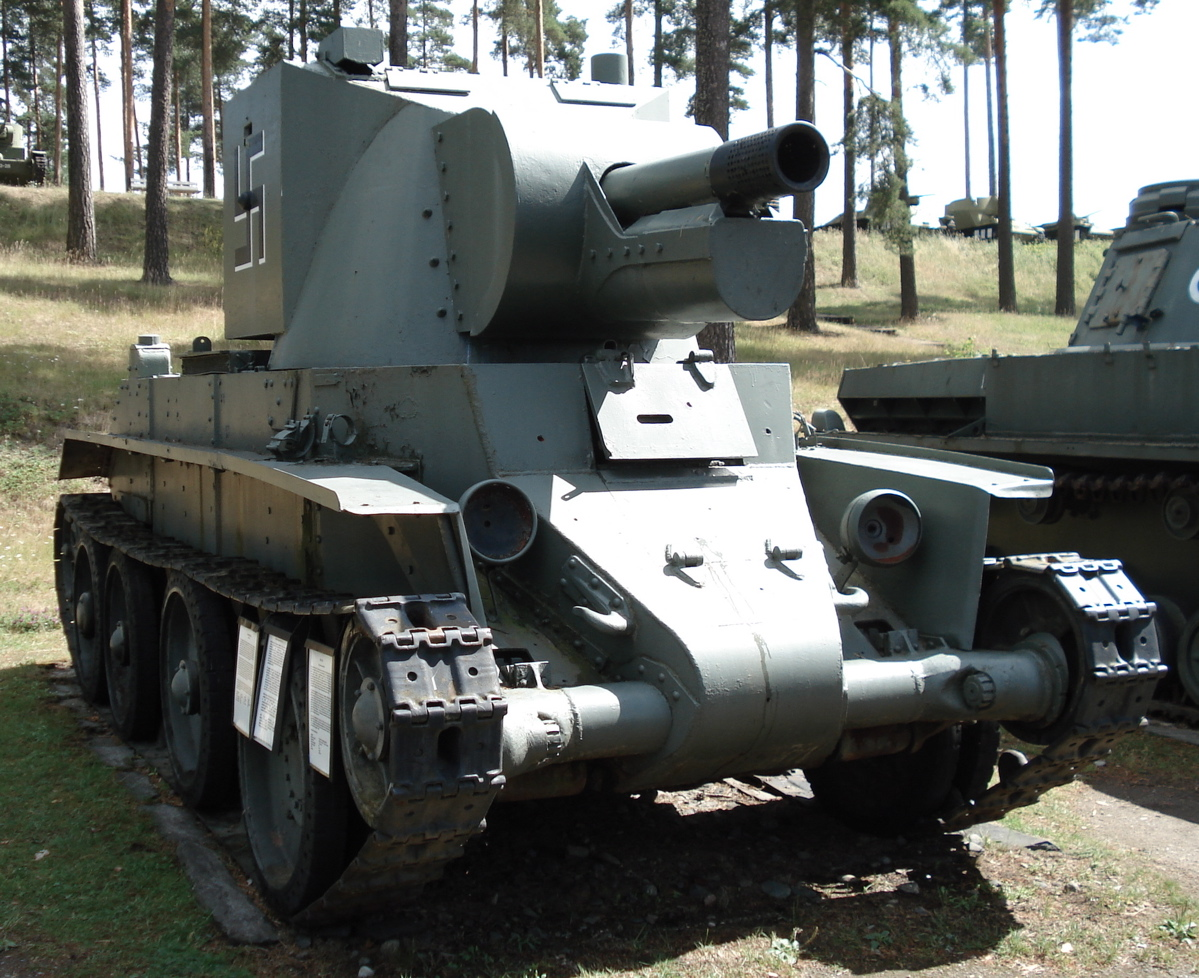
Finnish BT-42 assault gun, a modification of the Soviet BT-7

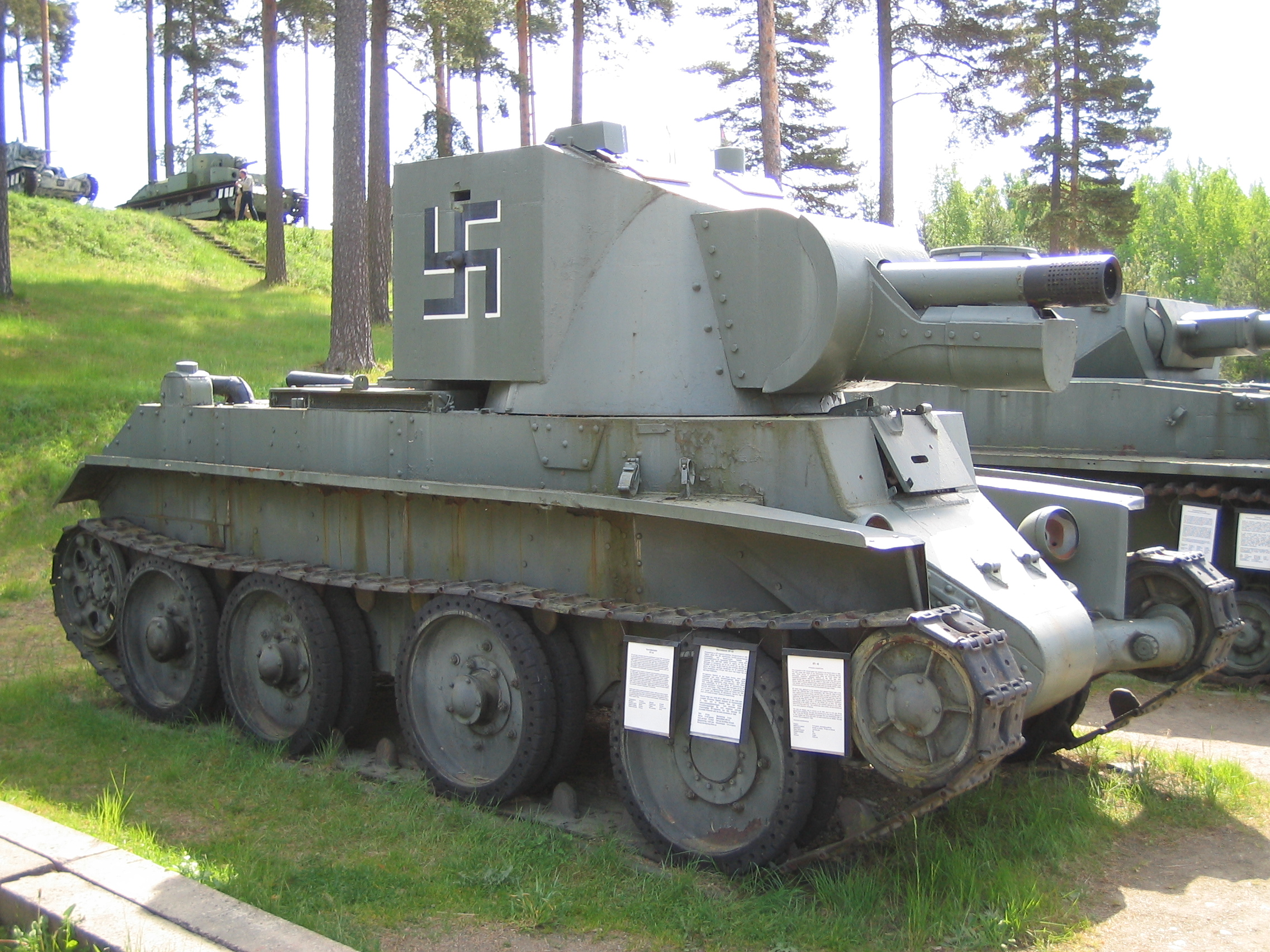
BT-42 from another angle

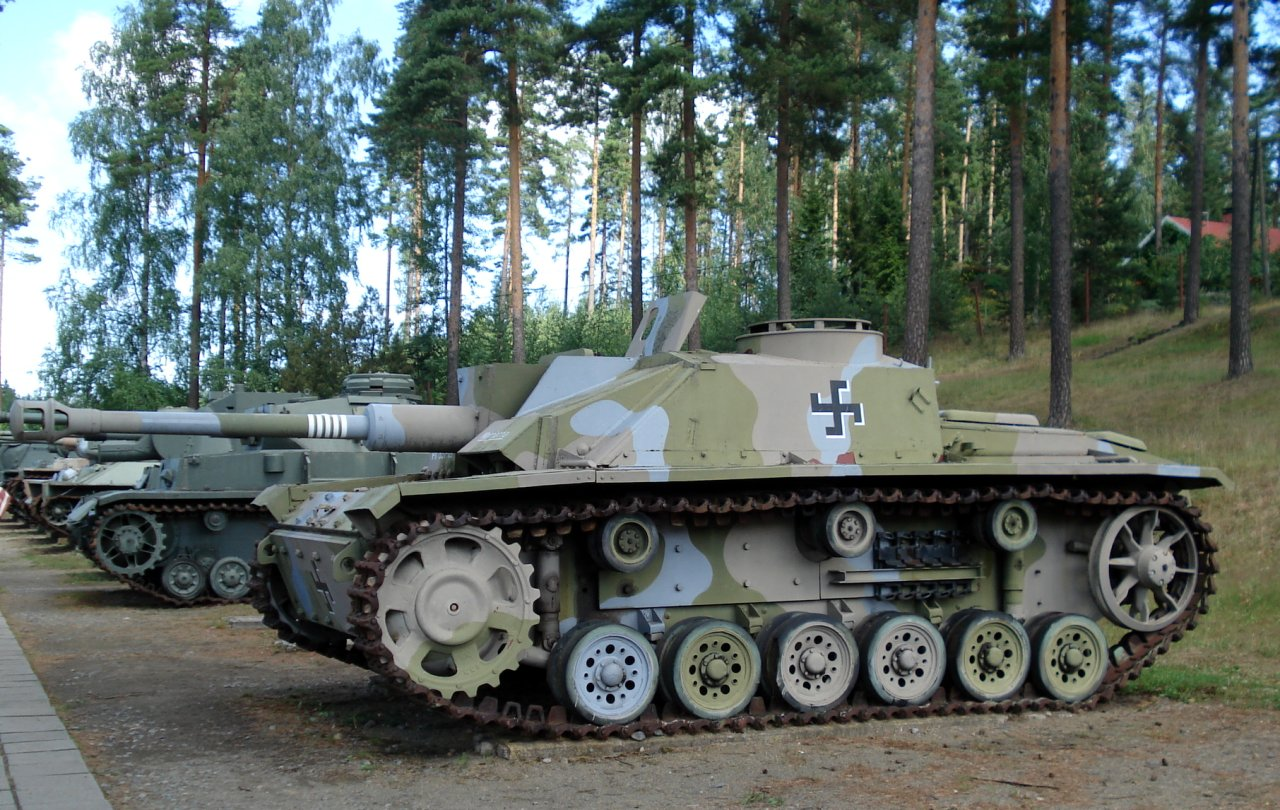
Sturmgeschütz III Ausf. G

== Armoured cars ==
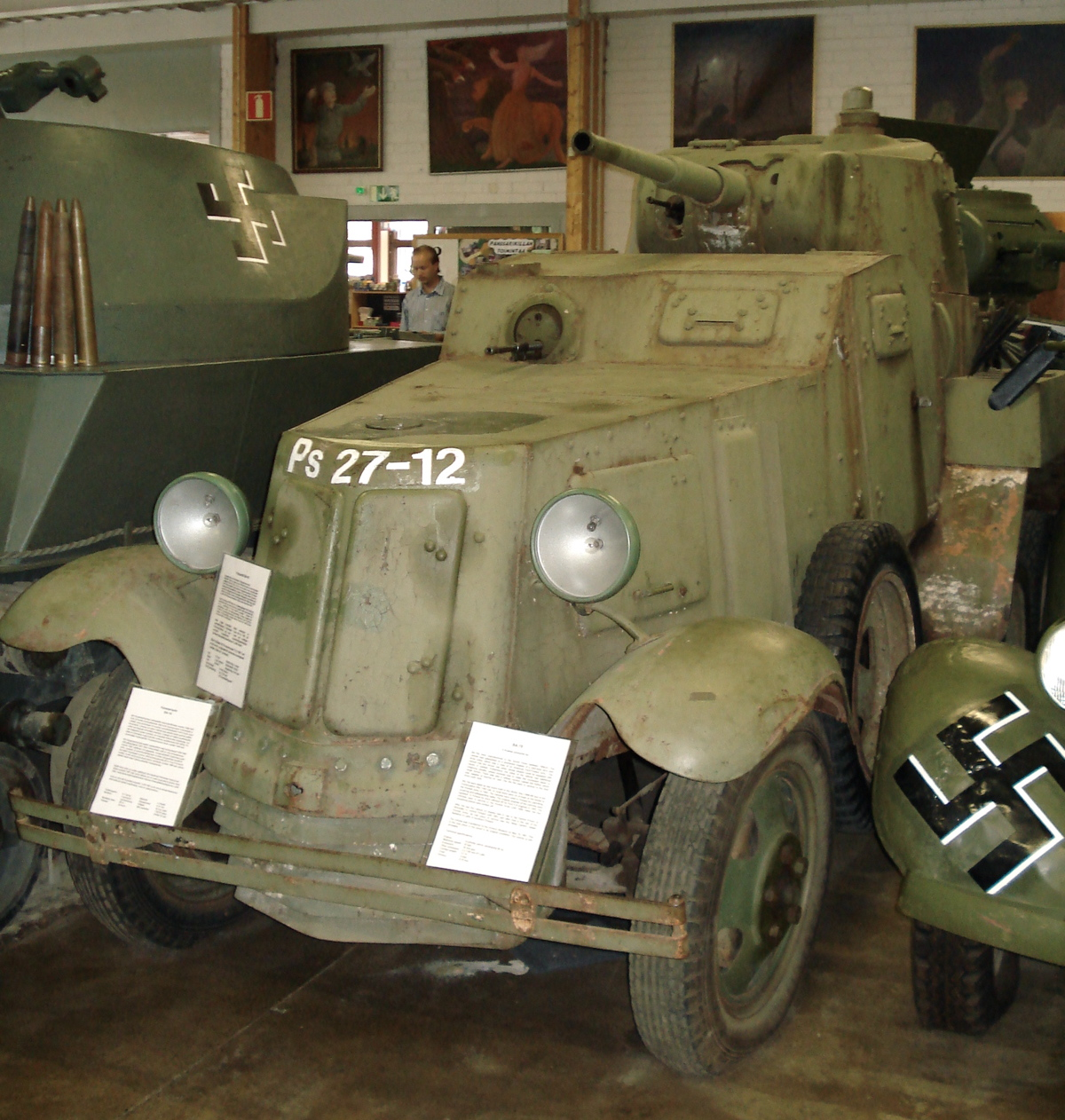
Captured Soviet BA-10 in Finnish markings, registered as Ps.27-12

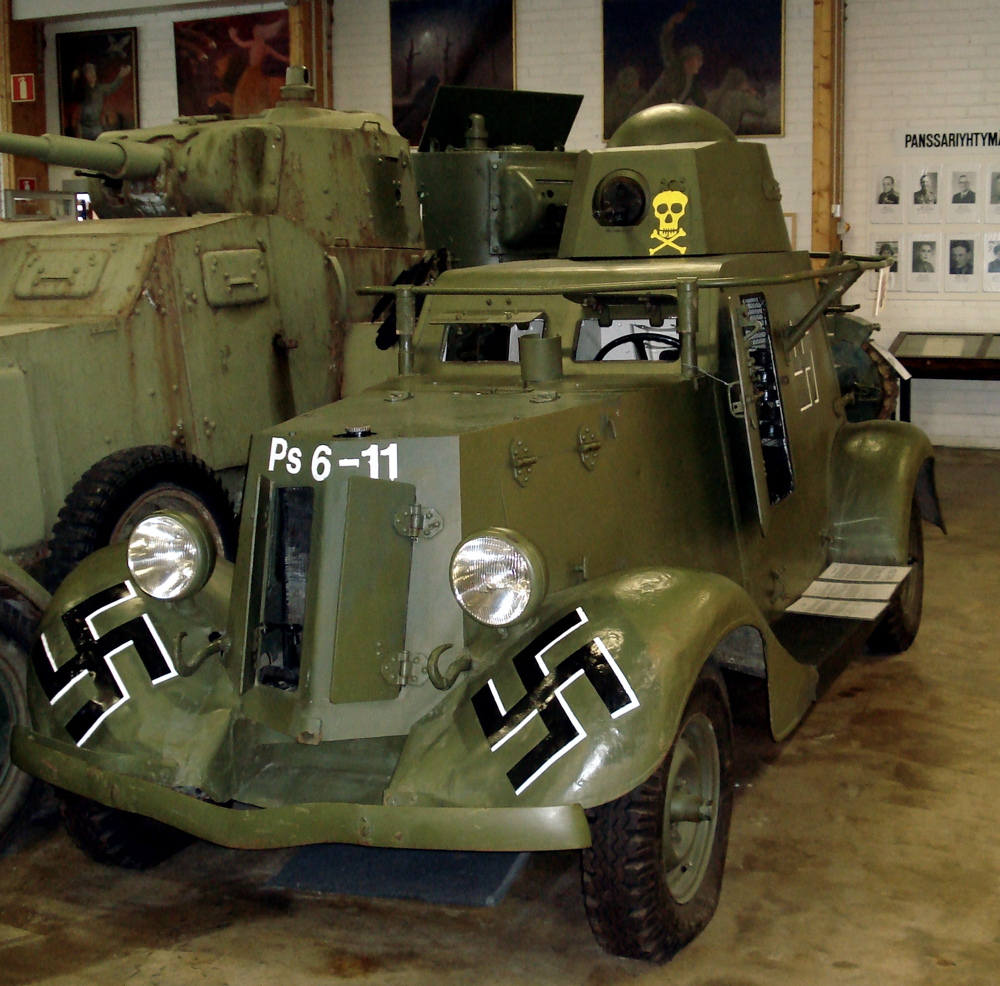
Captured Soviet BA-20 in Finnish markings, registered as Ps.6-11

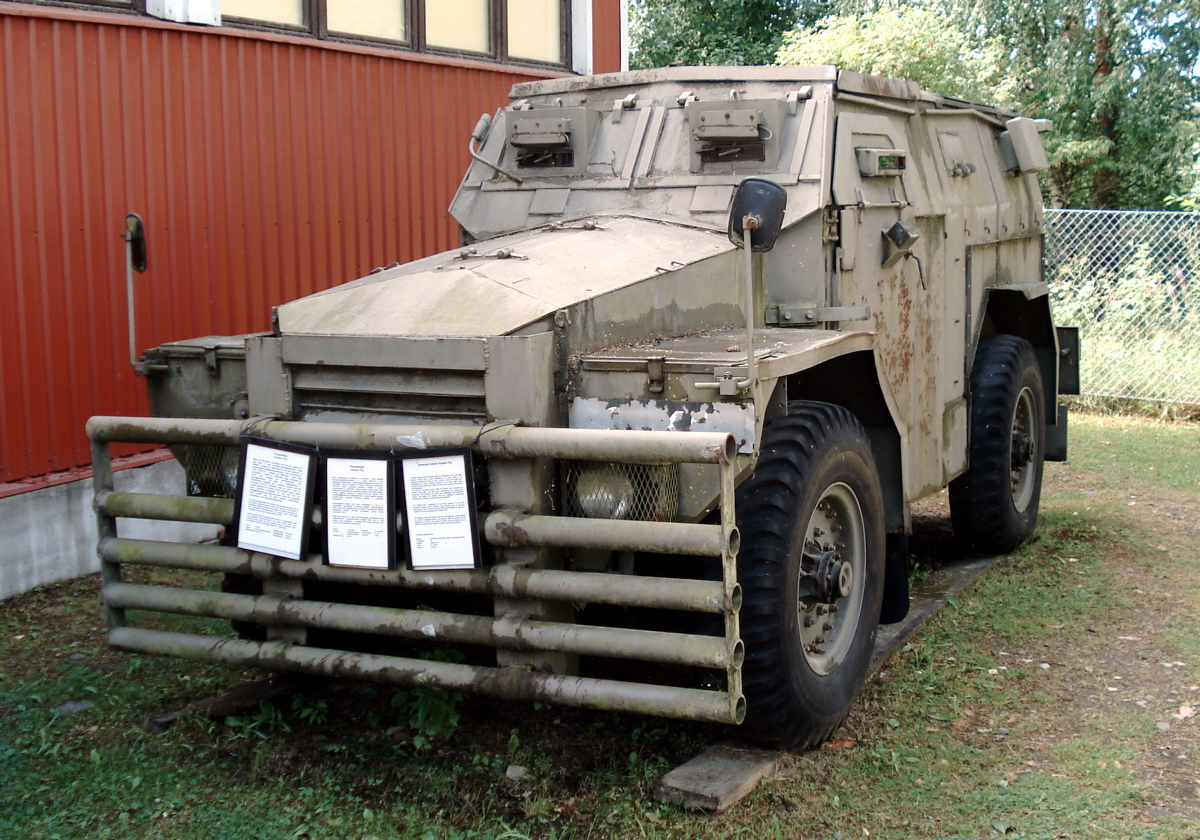
Humber Pig

== Infantry fighting vehicles ==
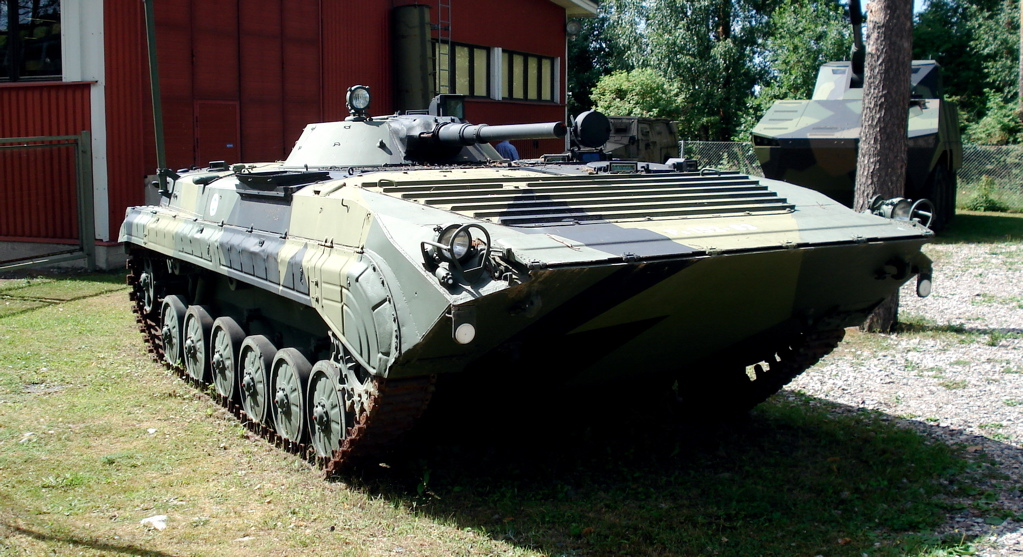
BMP-1

== Modern vehicles ==
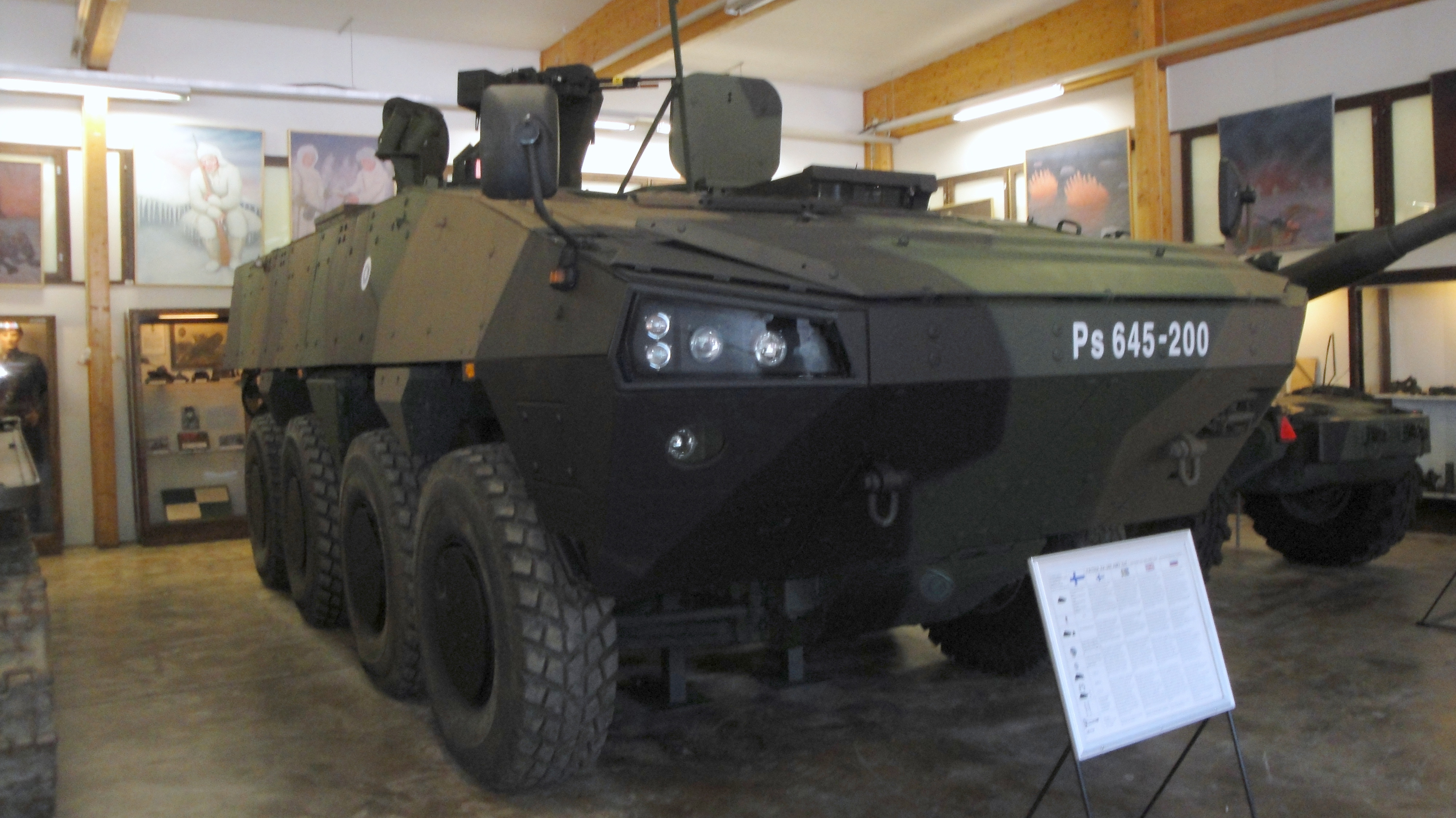
XA-360

== See also ==
- Parola
- Hattula
- The Artillery Museum of Finland
- Military Museum of Finland
