= BT-43 =

- Type: Fully tracked transport vehicle
- Place of origin: Finland

Service history
- In service: 1943 - ?
- Used by: Finland
- Wars: World War II

Production history
- Designer: ?
- Produced: 1943
- No. built: 1

Specifications
- Mass: 11 tons
- Length: 5.7m
- Width: 2.1m
- Height: 1.7m?
- Crew: 2 - 10
- Armor: 6-15mm
- Main armament: none
- Suspension: Christie
- Operational range: 155 km
- Maximum speed: 53 km/h

The BT-43 was a Finnish fully tracked transport vehicle prototype, designed during the Second World War. It was developed from the Russian-made BT-7 tank.

== History ==
In May 1943, a request was made for a fully tracked transport vehicle capable of carrying 20 men. It was decided to convert some obsolete BT series tanks into BT-43 carriers.The BT-43 appeared clumsy and with a high profile. The turret was removed, and a truck wooden platform was located on the modified hull, leaving this vehicle to transport ammunition tasks. The prototype was not a great success and no further development took place, with the prototype being scrapped in May 1945.

== See also ==
- BT-42
