= BT-7 =

BT-7, BT-7M
- BT-7M, 1940, with tracks removed from the wheels and carried on the hull
- Type: Light cavalry tank
- Place of origin: Soviet Union

Service history
- In service: 1935–45
- Used by: Soviet Union; Mongolia; Finland (captured); Hungary (captured); Romania (captured); Nazi Germany (captured)
- Wars: Soviet–Japanese Border Wars; World War II; Winter War; Continuation War; Soviet–Japanese War

Production history
- Designer: Morozov
- Designed: 1935
- Manufacturer: KhPZ
- Unit cost: 98,000 1935 rubles
- Produced: 1935–40
- No. built: 5753 (Note: 4821 BT-7, 779 BT-7M, 153 BT-7 (Artillery)})
- Variants: BT-7 (Artillery), BT-7M (BT-8), BT-IS

Specifications (BT-7 model 1937)
- Mass: 13.9 tonnes (13.7 long tons; 15.3 short tons)
- Length: 5.66 m (18 ft 7 in)
- Width: 2.29 m (7 ft 6 in)
- Height: 2.42 m (7 ft 11 in)
- Crew: 3 (commander, loader, driver)
- Armour: Hull: 6–40 mm Turret: 10–15 mm
- Main armament: 45 mm anti-tank gun M1932/38 (20-K)
- Secondary armament: 2 x 7.62 mm DT machine gun
- Engine: Mikulin M-17T (V-12) gasoline 450 hp (340 kW) at 1,750 rpm
- Power/weight: 32.37 hp/tonne
- Transmission: Chain drive (tracks: sliding gear)
- Suspension: Christie
- Ground clearance: 0.305 m (10 in)
- Fuel capacity: 620 litres (160 US gal)
- Operational range: Road: 250 km (160 mi); Off-road: 120 km (75 mi)
- Maximum speed: Road: 72–86 km/h (45–53 mph); Off-road: 50 km/h (31 mph)
- Steering system: steering stick

The BT-7 (Note: BT (Russian: БТ) is the Russian abbreviation for (Быстроходный танк, Bystrokhodny tank, 'fast tank')) was the last of the BT series of Soviet cavalry tanks that were produced in large numbers between 1935 and 1940. It was lightly armoured, but reasonably well-armed for the time, and had much better mobility than other contemporary tank designs. The BT tanks were known by the nickname Betka from the acronym, or its diminutive, Betushka.

The BT-7's successor was the famous T-34 medium tank, introduced in 1940, which replaced all of the Soviet fast tanks, infantry tanks, and medium tanks then in service.

== Development ==
The first prototypes of the BT-7 had a distinctive canted-ellipse shaped turret mounting both the main gun and a coaxial machine-gun. The specification also called for the project to allow for the installation of new guns without any significant change to the framework: the 76 mm KT-26 or PS-3 main gun (a short-barreled howitzer) and the 45 mm 20K model 1932/38 (M-32), a long-barreled, high-velocity gun useful against tanks, but less effective than the 76 mm gun against infantry.

In the rear of the turret, there was a rotating drum-type magazine for 18 76 mm shells or a radio station. The prototype underwent an extensive testing program between June and Autumn of 1934. As a result of this testing, it was felt that the hull machine-gun was unnecessary on a tank with a 3-man crew and removed.

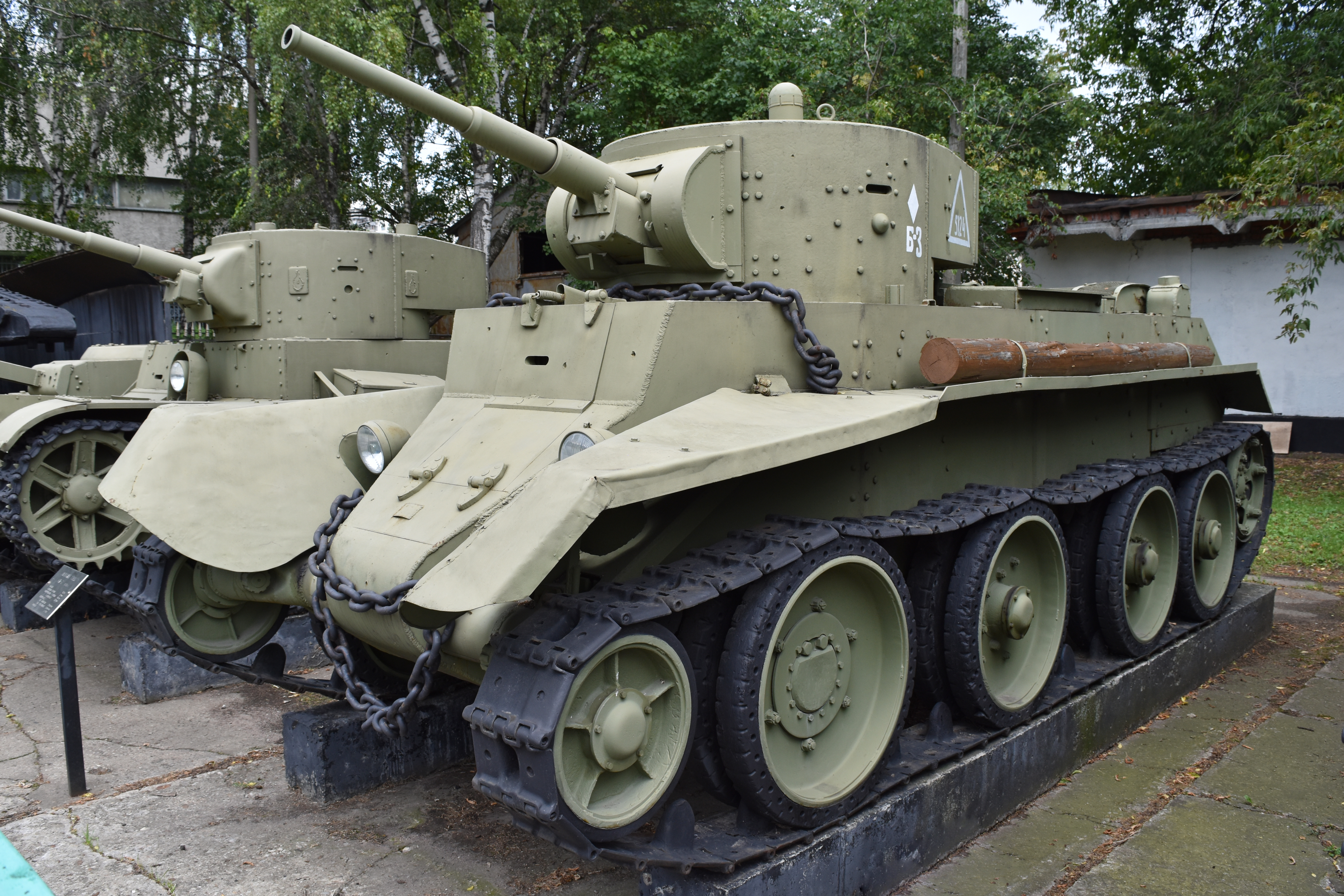
A 1935 BT-7 with the T-26 turret

Therefore, in early 1935, the tank went into production with a simplified BT-5 hull and the standard-issue turret from the BT-5. (However, the idea of a wheeled/tracked vehicle with a 76 mm cannon was not abandoned and the plant was commissioned to develop a new BT-7 turret from the turret of the T-26-4.) In the production model, a cylindrical turret housed a 45 mm 20K gun with a DT machine gun.

The annual production target of 500 BT-7s was met but with great difficulty because of delays of the armor from the Ilyich Metallurgical Plant in Mariupol and the M-17 engines from Plant No.26 in Rybinsk.

The crew consisted of three men: the commander (who also served as the gunner); the loader and the driver. In 1937, the company launched production of the BT-7 with a conical turret, three-gear gearbox and reinforced suspension. The main armament remained the same, but the ammunition was increased to 44 rounds. The production version tanks also were equipped with a DT machine gun in the rear of the turret but this was omitted from later units. For the firing of the gun and coaxial machine gun at night, the tank was equipped with two special projector-type headlamps. Subsequently, these lights were retrofitted to earlier models of the tank. Some tanks were equipped with an anti-air machine gun mount and a 71-TK-1 radio set using a handrail-style antenna initially and later a whip antenna.

A 1937 BT-7 model with a DT machine gun mounted on the back of the turret

In 1938, Improvements were made to the drive wheels and caterpillar tracks. Also, several design changes were made in the same year, including removing the rubber rims on the drive sprockets and replacing the large-link track by a small-link track. In total 2620 BT-7 tanks were produced with large-link tracks and some were fitted with small-link tracks in 1939. As part of a modernization program, the thickness of the frontal armor was increased to 22 mm and the combat weight increased to 13,925kg.

A BT-7A (Artillery) variant

In parallel with the main modification, 153 BT-7A (Artillery) tanks were produced between 1936 and 1938. The first 5 were equipped with T-26-4 turrets and 76 mm KT-26 guns, were produced in 1936. Another 149 of these vehicles were made in the following year, 1937. Some experimental BT-7A tanks were fitted with 76 mm L-10 (1937) and F-32 (1939) guns. A small number of OP-7 flamethrower tank variants were also produced.

The BT-7 was an improvement to the BT-5 having several improvements including the more powerful Mikulin M-17T engine with more fuel capacity, thicker frontal armor, a fully-welded design, a stronger gearbox and a new clutch.

Several experimental tanks were conceived based on the BT series, for example the wheeled BT-IS, designed by N.F. Tsyganov, a platoon commander in the 4th Armoured Regiment of the Ukraine Military District and self-taught designer. The type successfully passed field tests, but was not ordered in bulk. Another Tsyganov design was the SV-2 "Cherepakha" (turtle, черепаха), with a new design of hull and turret. There was also the command tank KBT-7 with a fixed superstructure, the OT-7 mounting a flamethrower, the KhBT-7 designed to protect from toxic contamination and lay smokescreens, the SBT bridgelayer and the TTBT-7 and Thubten-7 radio-controlled tanks (known at the time as Teletanks).

Shortly before Operation Barbarossa (the German invasion of the Soviet Union), the BT-7 underwent an up-armoring program. In 1940, the Ilyich Iron and Steel Works in Mariupol produced 50 sets of hinged homogeneous armor for the BT-7M, which increased the weight of the test tank to 18 tons. Unfortunately, nothing is known about the installation of these kits to military units.

Between 1935 and 1940, 5753 BT-7 tanks of all modifications were built.

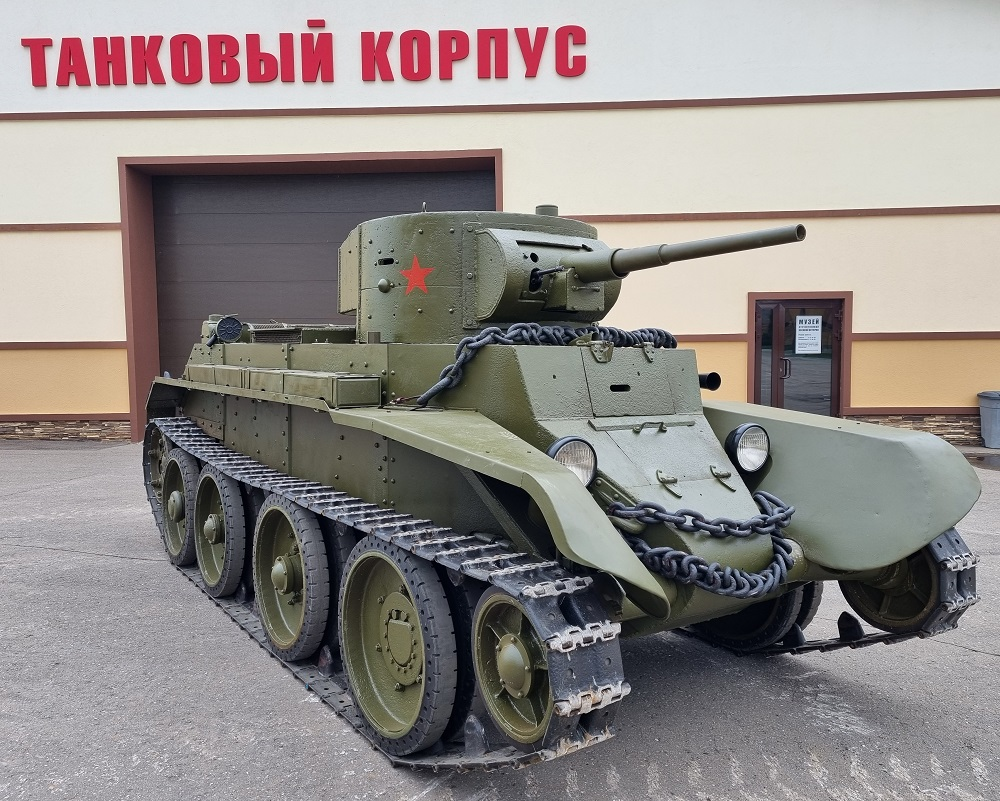
A BT-7 tank with the towing chain visible

A characteristic of all BT tanks, including the BT-7 and BT-7M, is their towing chain at the front of the vehicle. BT tanks used a towing chain instead of a towing cable.

== BT-7M (BT-8) ==
The BT-7M was mostly identical to the BT-7 apart from its engine which was diesel to reduce fuel consumption.

The BT-7, while having large fuel capacity, also had high consumption, up to 1.5kg/km when on wheels. Because of this, in 1936, the Kharkhiv Locomotive Factory built two experimental BT-8 prototypes with the BD-2 diesel engine. Because of delays in the technical drawings they were not completed until 1937 and two more were made in 1938. During the development phase, the engine was referred to as "Order V" and as the project matured, the engine was designated "Order V-2" and "V-2" became its official name.

Because of The Great Purge, progress was slow and testing on the V-2 engine started took place in August of 1938. Three engines were tested by seeing how they would handle 100 hours of operation. The first failed after 72 hours, the second broke just after 100 hours and the third ran for 100 hours but had excessive oil consumption, a smoky exhaust and a cracked cylinder head. All three engines were rejected.

In February of 1939, the first comparative tests took place with the BT-8 and BT-7 tanks, then named A-8 and A-7 which contained the V2 and M-17T engines respectively. While the V-2 engine still proved unreliable, it was seemed a suitible replacement because of its lower fuel consumption. In June, the V-2 engine successfully passed testing proving its reliability. On 5 September, the People's Commissariat issued an order recommending the tank for mass production and by December, the first production BT-8 tanks were produced under the designation BT-7M. They were externally the same as the BT-7s and stayed in production until the end of 1940, for a short time alongside the T-34.

In 1939, the V-2 engine was also tested in 3 modernized BT-5 which had the transmission and gearbox of the BT-7 and even though the project seemed promising, it did not progress further.

The V-3, a variant of the V-2 was fitted in a BT-5 which covered over 2,600km on tracks but it was never adopted as its 300 horsepower was seemed insufficient. A refined version of the V-3, the V-4 was used in the T-50. The BT-8 (BT-7M) also featured better armor because of the BT-7's performance in the Spanish civil war. A descendant of the V-2 would later power the T-72.

The V-2 engine was a collaborative effort that included the Central Institute of Aviation Engine Development and the J. V. Stalin Military Academy of Mechanization and Motorization.

== Combat experience ==
In the battle of Khalkin Gol, in August 1939, General Geogri Zhukov's 500 BT-5s and BT-7s managed to break through the Japanese Sixth Army, demonstrating Tukhachevsky's 'deep operations' tactics. It was able to resist artillery fire because of its sloped armor and it also proved to be very effective against the Japanese Type 95 tanks because of its large gun. The better Type 97 was not present in significant numbers to make an impact.

The BT-7 was also used in the Winter War in 1939-1940. There, it became apparent that the tank was too lightly armored.

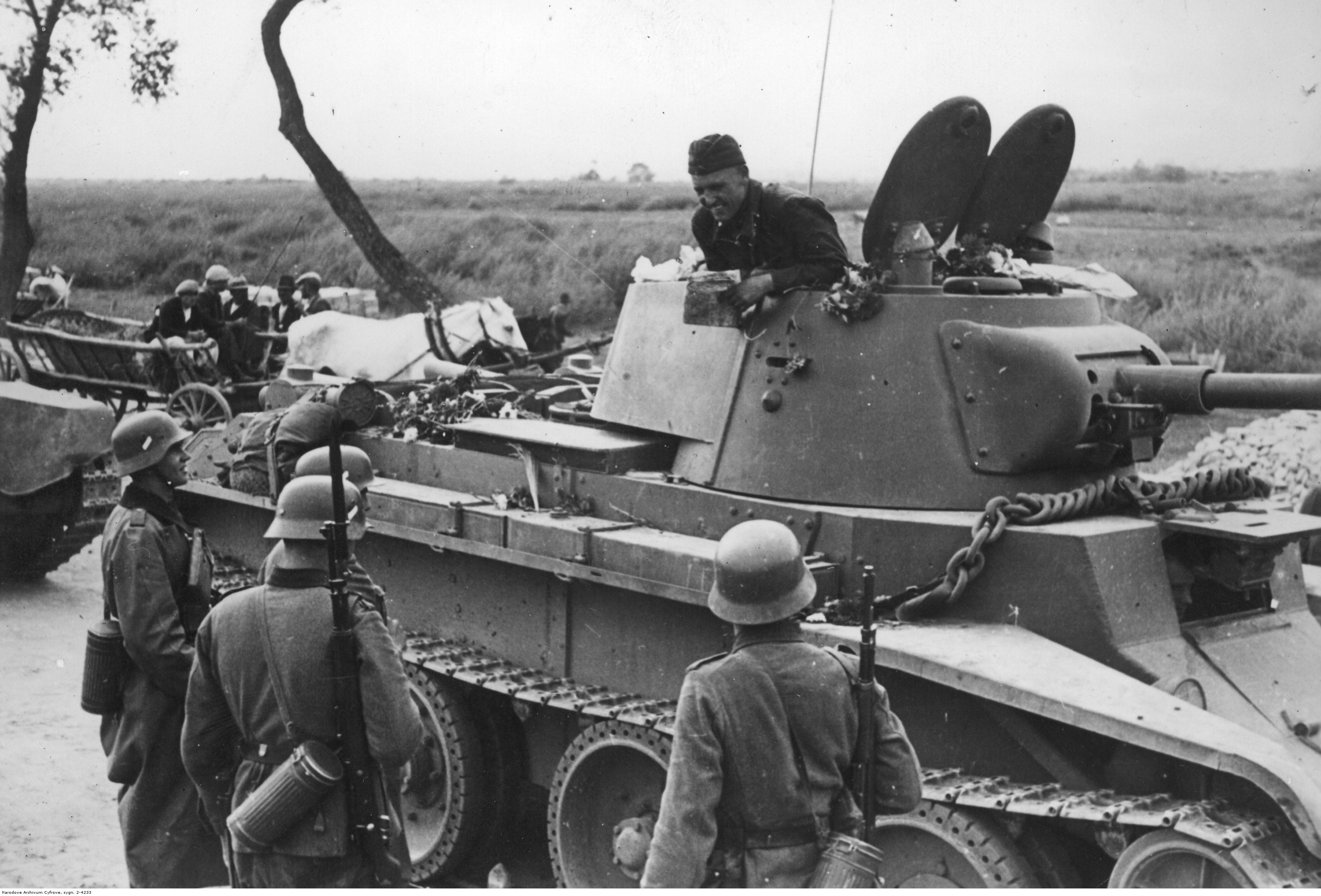
German infantry and Soviet armored forces meet along the agreed-upon demarcation line after the 1939 Invasion of Poland.

In June 1941, at the outset of Barbarossa, the BT-7 was used as the main cavalry tank of the Soviet army. The early BT tanks, like the BT-2 and BT-5 couldn't contend with German medium tanks while the BT-7 outclassed the Panzer II and Panzer 38(t) and was comparable to the Panzer III, especially the later BT-7Ms. However, in battles, the BT tanks performed much worse than their German counterparts because of their crew's lack of training and poor maintenance. Because of its double hatches on the roof of the turret, it was nicknamed "Mickey Mouse" by Germans.

Tank losses were high, with over 2,000 BT-7 series tanks lost in the first 12 months on the Eastern Front. Hundreds more had been immobilized before the invasion by poor maintenance, and these had to be abandoned as the Soviet forces withdrew eastward.

The BT-7 continued to be operated by the armored and mechanized forces of the Red Army for almost the entire war, but in greatly-decreased numbers after 1941.

By 1 November 1942, 32 BT-7 tanks were captured by Romanian forces. BT-7 tanks were also captured by Finnish forces, with 53 BT-7Ms being captured by mid-1942. 18 were converted to BT-42s and a prototype for a BT-43 tank was made using the BT-7M chassis.

BT-7 series tanks continued in use by the Soviets in the Far East, against Japanese forces which lacked the heavy tanks of their German allies. BT-7 tanks were employed against Japanese forces in the Battles of Khalkhin Gol in 1939 and the Manchurian Strategic Offensive Operation in 1945.

== Impact ==
The BT-7's success at Khalkin Gol alarmed the Soviet high command who were in the process of dismantling the mechanized corps after Tukhachevsky's death during Stalin's purge lead to reversal of his armored reforms. This victory was one of the reasons that the Soviet high command ordered an urgent recreation of the armored corps. Operation Barbarossa caught the Red Army in the middle of this reorganization.

The T-34 was heavily inspired by the BT-7, being an upgrade and refinement of the BT-7. It also inherited some of the BT-7's features like its Christie suspension, its sloped armor design and the V-2 diesel engine used in the BT-7M. A descendant of the V-2 diesel engine would also be used for the T-72.

== Survivors ==
Although many BT-7 tanks were produced, as of early 2018, there is only one known remaining BT-7 that is currently in operational order, located in Belarus.

== Organization and use ==
The Table of Organization and Equipment for a typical Soviet light tank brigade in 1939 is as follows:

- 3 tank battalions, each containing:
  - Three tank companies, each with 17 BT-7 or T-26 tanks;
  - 1 signal platoon;
  - 1 anti-tank platoon with three 45 mm antitank guns;
  - 1 antiaircraft machine gun (AA MG) platoon
- 1 reserve tank company, with eight BT-7 or T-26 tanks;
- 1 signal company, with five T-37A tanks;
- 1 motorized infantry battalion, containing
  - 3 motorized rifle companies;
  - 1 signal platoon;
  - 1 antitank platoon with three 45 mm antitank guns;
  - 1 AA MG platoon
- 1 additional AA MG platoon in brigade headquarters;
- 1 motor transport battalion;
- 1 reconnaissance battalion;
- 1 pioneer company;
- 1 medical company;
- 1 chemical company (flamethrowers).
