= T-28 (medium tank) =

Soviet medium tank

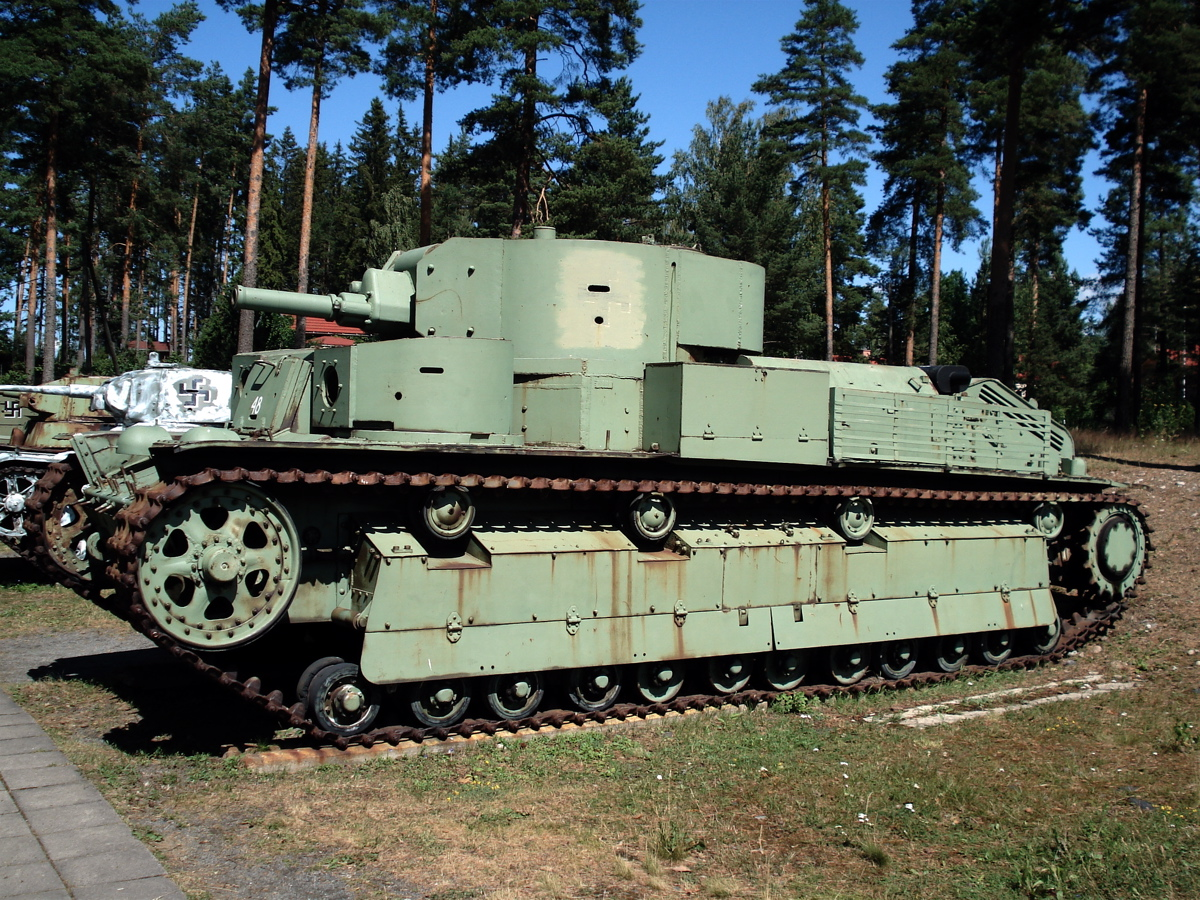
- T-28E registered as R-48, since 1943 Ps. 241–4, at the Parola Tank Museum in Finland
- Type: Medium tank
- Place of origin: Soviet Union

Service history
- In service: 1933–45
- Used by: Soviet Union
- Wars: Soviet invasion of Poland, Winter War, World War II, Continuation War

Production history
- Designed: 1931
- Produced: 1932–41
- No. built: 503
- Variants: T-28E, T-28 Model 1940, OT-28

Specifications
- Mass: 28 tonnes
- Length: 7.44 m (24 ft 5 in)
- Width: 2.87 m (9 ft 5 in)
- Height: 2.82 m (9 ft 3 in)
- Crew: 6
- Armour: 20–40 mm (0.79–1.57 in)
- Main armament: 76.2 mm KT-28 howitzer (70 rounds)
- Secondary armament: 4 or 5×7.62 mm DT machine guns (8,000 rounds)
- Engine: 46.9 L Mikulin M-17 V12 engine 500 hp (370 kW)
- Power/weight: 18 hp/t (13 kW/t; 16 hp/ST)
- Suspension: plunger suspension with twin bogies
- Operational range: 220 km (140 mi)
- Maximum speed: 43.5 km/h (27.0 mph)

The T-28 was a Soviet multi-turreted medium tank. The prototype was completed in 1931, and production began in late 1932. It was an infantry support tank intended to break through fortified defences. The T-28 was designed to complement the heavier T-35 (also multi-turreted), with which it shared turret designs. The type did not have great success in combat, but it played an important role as a development project for Soviet tank designers. A series of new ideas and solutions that were tried out on the T-28 were later incorporated in future models.

== Design history ==
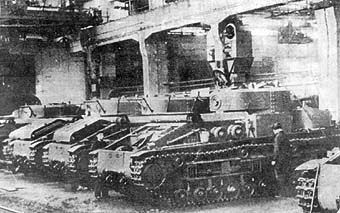
Production of the T-28

The T-28 was in many ways similar to the British Vickers A1E1 Independent—a tank which greatly influenced tank design during the interwar years, even though only a single prototype was manufactured in 1926. The Kirov Factory in Leningrad began manufacturing a tank that was based on the design of the British Independent in 1932. The T-28 tank was officially approved on 11 August 1933. The T-28 had one large turret with a 76.2 mm gun and two smaller turrets with 7.62 mm machine guns. A total of 503 T-28 tanks were manufactured over the eight-year period from 1933 to 1941.

== Combat history ==
The T-28 was deployed during the 1939 Soviet invasion of Poland, and the Winter War with Finland. During the initial stages of the Winter War, the tank was used in direct fire missions against Finnish pillboxes. In the course of these operations, it was found that the armour was inadequate and an upgrade was initiated. The frontal armour plates were upgraded from 30 mm to 80 mm and side and rear plates to 40 mm thickness. With this up-armoured version, the Red Army broke through the main Finnish defensive fortification, the Mannerheim Line.

According to Russian historian Maksim Kolomiets in his book T-28. Stalin's Three-headed Monster, over 200 T-28s were knocked out during the Winter War, but only 20 of them were irrecoverable losses (including two captured by the Finnish Army). Due to the proximity of the Kirov Plant, all other knocked-out tanks were repaired, some of them more than five times. (Note: Finnish sources mention 92 T-28s destroyed during the Winter War and some tens of T-28s destroyed during the Continuation War.)

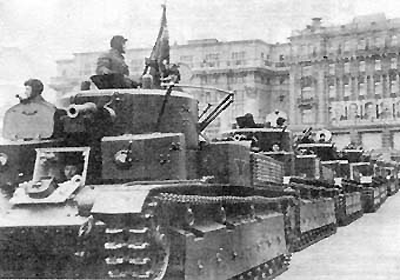
T-28 tanks, with horseshoe radio antennas.

The Finns nicknamed the T-28 Postivaunu ("mail coach" or "postal wagon") after a lone Soviet T-28 tank commander was captured with his knocked out tank that carried the monthly salary of, and mail addressed to, the 91st Tank Battalion (this occurred 19–20 December 1939, during the battle of Summa). Another explanation was that the straight vertical surfaces alluded to the stagecoaches of the Wild West. The T-28 was also nicknamed Kivitalo ("stone building", i.e., apartment house) by the Finns due to its large size.

The Finns captured two T-28s during the Winter War and five in the Continuation War, for a total of 7 vehicles. The Finnish Army did not have tractors that could tow away vehicles as heavy as the T-28, and so captured T-28s that could not move under their own power were stripped of anything useful (machine guns, radios etc.) and left where they were.

The Soviets had 411 T-28 tanks when the Germans invaded the Soviet Union in June 1941. A large majority of these were lost during the first two months of the invasion, many of them abandoned after mechanical breakdown. Some T-28s took part in the 1941 winter defense of Leningrad and Moscow, but after late 1941, they were rare in Red Army service; a few were operated by enemy forces.

Today, three T-28s remain, two in Finland and one in Moscow. One restored T-28 is on display in Finnish field camouflage in the Parola Tank Museum, Finland. A further wreck is stored at Parola, now awaiting restoration and a hull previously used as a bunker was discovered near St. Petersburg.

== Assessment ==
The T-28 had a number of advanced features for its time, including radio (in all tanks) and anti-aircraft machine gun mounts. Just before the Second World War, many received armour upgrades, bringing its protection on par with the early Panzer IV, although its suspension and layout were outdated.

== Variants ==
- T-28 Model 1934 (German designation: T-28A) – main production model with the same machine gun turrets, and similar main turret, with the KT-28 76.2 mm gun, as the T-35 heavy tank. During the production minor changes were introduced, such as the addition of a grille above the rear fan in 1935, two hatches replacing the larger one on the turret and the addition of a ball mount for the rear machine gun in 1936.
- T-28 Model 1938 (T-28B) – version with the improved L-10 76.2 mm gun (from 16.5 to 26 calibres). Some older tanks were also backfitted with spare L-10 guns. The rod antenna replaced the horseshoe in early 1939.
- T-28E (T-28C) – 1940 addition of appliqué armour in response to poor performance in Finland. Total front armour was increased to 50–60 mm, weight to 32 tonnes, and road speed dropped to 23 km/h. 111 tanks of all models (possibly including ones with conical turrets) were upgraded in late 1940.
- T-28-57-experimental version with ZiS-4 57mm high-velocity gun, contemporary of the T-34-57 and KV-1-57 experimental tanks.
- T-28-85— prototype with the improved F30 85 mm gun.
- T-28 Model 1940 – the final batch of about thirteen tanks with main conical turret similar to ones on the late‑production T-35 tanks.

=== Experimental models ===
Several self-propelled guns, the IT-28 bridging tank, and an engineering vehicle with mine rollers were tested on the T-28 tank chassis, but none were accepted for production. The T-29 was a prototype medium tank, a modernized T-28 with Christie suspension - a later version of this vehicle was considered for the competition of prototypes, which led to the T-34, but by then it was outdated (not to be confused with a Grotte tank project also called T-29). The T-28 also served as a testbed for the KV tank suspension.

== Operators ==
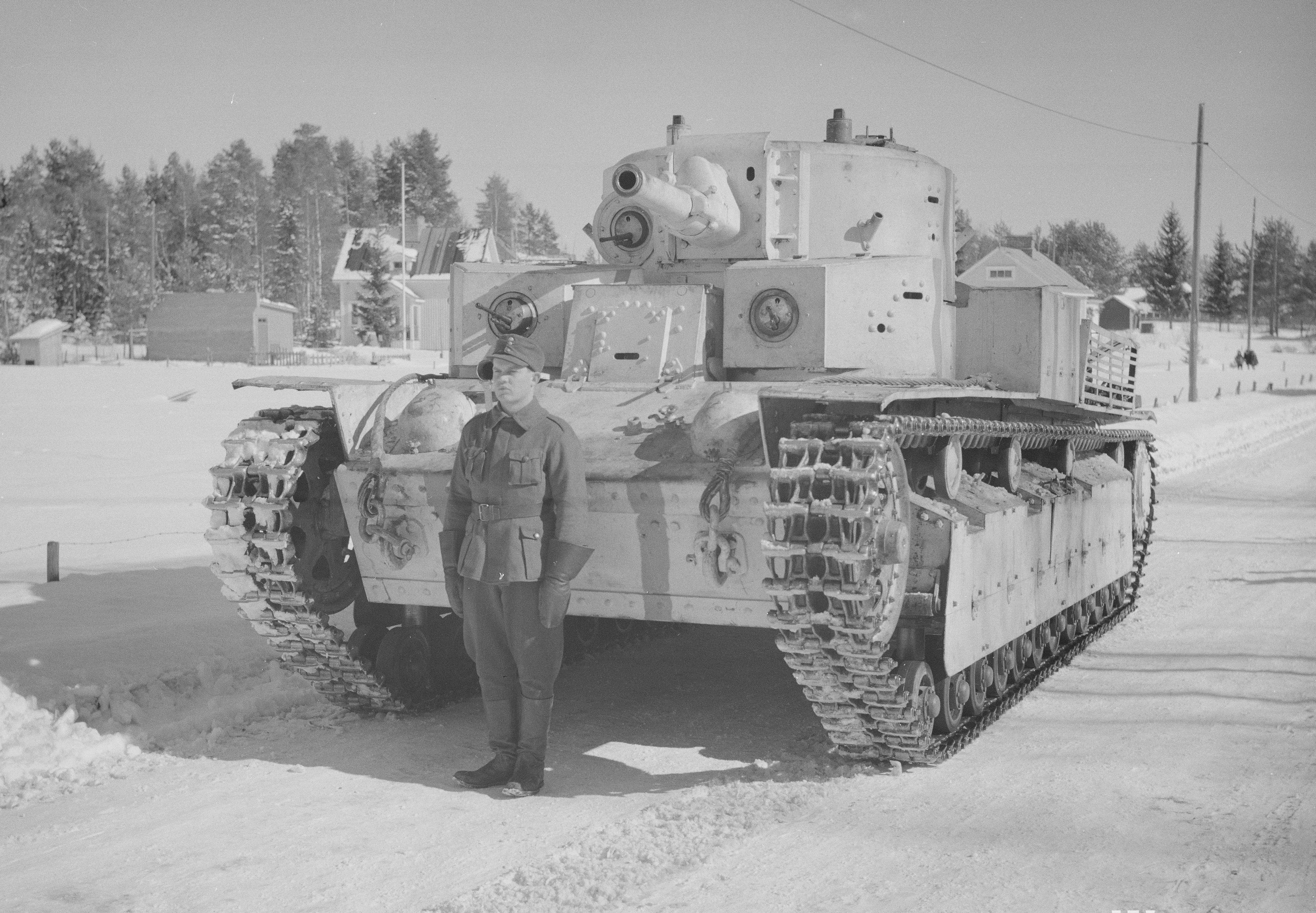
T-28 operated by Finland. April, 1940

- USSR
  - Museums and displays on the Russian federation: Central Armed Forces Museum. Moscow, model 1927/1932, a hull from T-28 in Museum "Sestroretsk Boundary" at industrial complex-1 "Elephant", Beloostrov
- Finland - captured seven Soviet T-28 tanks during the Winter War and the Second World War.
  - Museums and displays in Finland: Register number Ps. 241-4 Parola Tank Museum, Ps. 241 wreck, Ps. 241 Mikkeli on the front yard of the former reserve non‑commissioned officer school in Karkialampi near the land‑force headquarters,
- (Kingdom of Hungary) Hungary - the Hungarian Army used one captured T-28 tank in the summer of 1941.
- (Kingdom of Romania) Romania - As of 1 November 1942, Romanian forces captured 2 T-28 tanks.
- Nazi Germany - Germany captured and made operational at least one T-28 during Operation Barbarossa, designated Panzerkampfwagen T-28 746(r).
- Turkey - According to one source, two were sold to Turkey in 1935, along with 60 T-26, five T-27 tankettes, and about 60 BA-6 armoured cars to form the 1st Tank Regiment of the 2nd Cavalry Division at Luleburgaz.

== See also ==
- T-35, a similar but much larger and heavier design that was intended to operate alongside the T-28
- List of tanks
- List of Soviet tanks
