= NIIDAR =

Soviet-Russian radar system manufacturer

Scientific and Research Institute for Long-Distance Radio Communications
- Type: Open joint-stock company
- Industry: Defense
- Founded: 1916
- Headquarters: Moscow, Russia
- Parent: RTI Systems (Sistema)
- Website: www.niidar.ru

The NIIDAR company, the Scientific and Research Institute for Long-Distance Radio Communications (Russian: Научно-исследовательский институт дальней радиосвязи) is a Russian manufacturer of radar systems.

== History ==
It was established in 1916 as an automobile repairs workshop, to repair vehicles damaged during World War I. After 1939 it became known as the "Plant No. 37 named after Sergo Ordzhonikidze". In the 1930s and 1940s, the plant built a number of light tanks, including the T-37A, T-38, T-40, T-60. It developed a number of radars from 1949 to 1959 in co-operation with the NII-20 Lianozovo Electromechanical Plant.

== Products ==
Unlike the NNIIRT, this design bureau focused on higher frequency radars like the P-20, P-30, P-30M, P-35, P-32D2 and the P-50 (NATO: E/F-bands). These radars have better accuracy and faster scan rates, and are thus more suited for ground control of fighter aircraft, which complement the lower frequency radars developed by the NNIIRT design bureau.

NNIDAR has in recent years expanded their product range to include innovative radar designs like the Podsolnukh-E over-the-horizon (OTH) surface-wave radar and the 29B6 Konteyner. The latter, while also being an OTH-radar, has separate locations for the transmitter and the receiver making it a bi-static system.

== NIIDAR designed air surveillance radars ==
Radar	NATO reporting name	Radio spectrum (NATO)	Developed	Notes
P-20 Periscope		E/F-band	1949	
P-50 Observatory		E/F-band	1949	Stationary variant of P-20
P-30	BIG MESH	E/F-band	1955	
P-30M			1959	
P-35 Saturn	BAR LOCK	E/F-band	1958	
P-35M	BAR LOCK	E/F-band	1961	P-35 with Improved antenna layout
Sword-35	BAR LOCK	E/F-band	1971	faster scanning, improved antenna layout, polarization filters, pulse duration/frequency modulation
Podsolnukh-E		VHF	around 2000	Surface-wave radar
29B6 Konteyner		VHF	around 2000	Bi-static radar
Vitim (radar)		VHF		Bi-static radar

== Owners and management ==
According to the data for the second quarter of 2014, 50% plus 2 shares of the company belong to JSC Concern RTI Sistema, 50% minus 2 shares belong to JSC RTI holding.

According to various sources the company was headed by:

- S. Ivanov — in 1930;
- B. K. Gutnov — from 1934 to August 29, 1937;
- M. I. Shor — from August 29, 1937 to 1938;
- N. A. Bogoroditsky — from 1946 to 1952;
- P. I. Kuznetsov — in 1955;
- S. V. Skorikov — from 1956 to 1959;
- F. V. Lukin — from 1960 to 1963 (director and scientific supervisor of the Research Institute-37);
- V. I. Markov — from 1963 to 1968 and from 1981 to 1989 (director of NIRTI/NIIDAR);
- Yu. N. Aksenov — from 1968 to 1970 (director of NIRTI);
- P. S. Lisovets — from 1970 to 1975 (Acting Director of NIRTI/NIIDAR);
- F. A. Kuzminsky — from 1975 to 1981;
- A. A. Trukhmanov — from 1990 to 2000;
- S. D. Saprykin — from 2000 to 2010;
- S. I. Shlyaev — from 2010 to 2015;
- A. R. Miloslavsky — from 2015 to 2018;
- K. V. Makarov — from 2018 to 2020;
- Yu. G. Anoshko — from 2020.
