= Steelyard (disambiguation) =

The Steelyard was the trading post of the Hanseatic League in London.

Steelyard or steel yard may also refer to:

- Duga radar, a Soviet radar system codenamed "steel yard"
- Pohang Steel Yard, a football stadium in South Korea
- Steelyard balance, a type of straight-beam balance

== See also ==
- Steelmaking
- Steel mill
