= T-60 tank =

Soviet light tank

T-60 scout tank
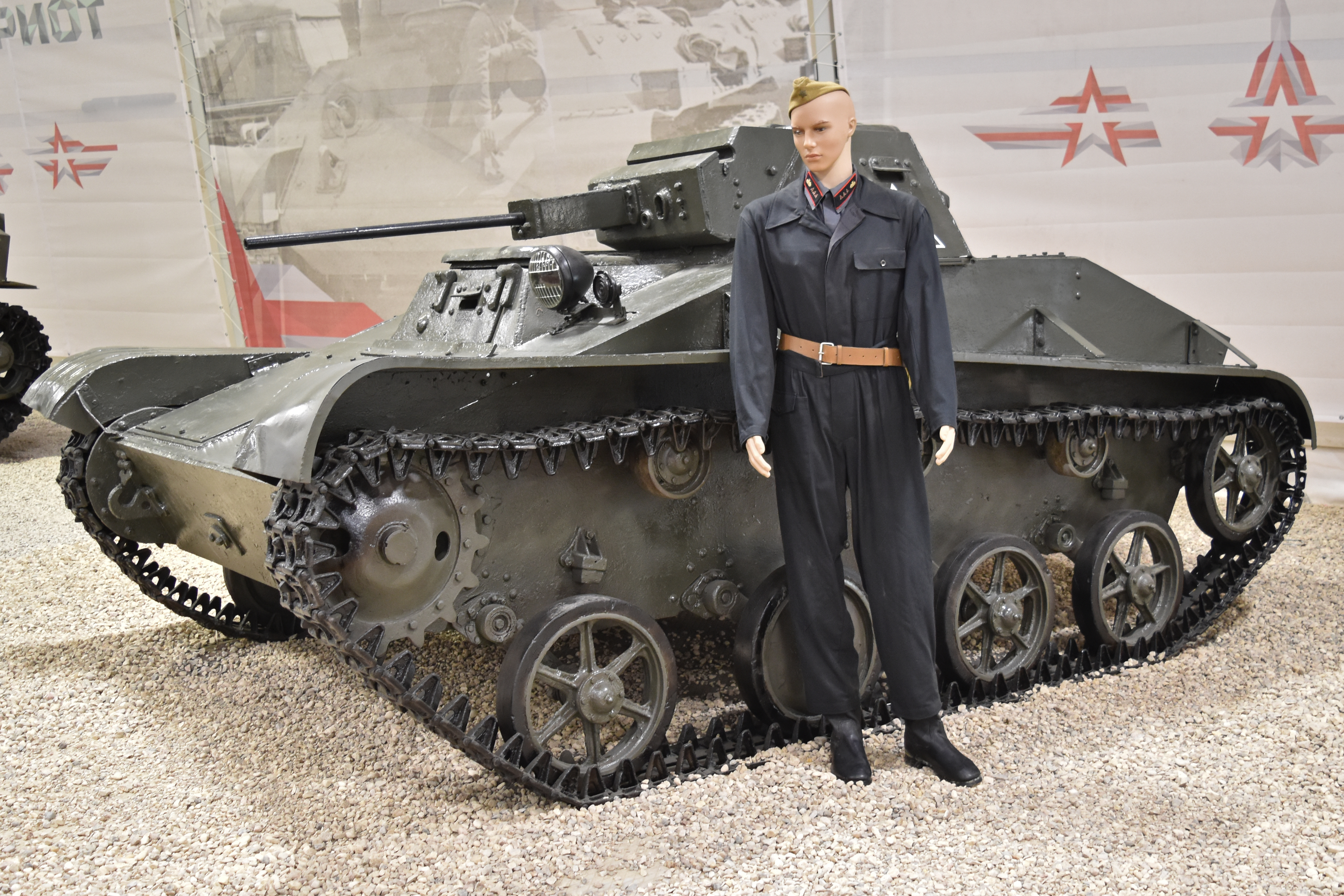
- T-60 at the Kubinka Tank Museum
- Type: Light tank
- Place of origin: Soviet Union

Service history
- In service: 1941–45
- Used by: Soviet Union; Nazi Germany (captured); Poland (only for training); Romania (captured)
- Wars: World War II

Production history
- Designer: Nicholas Astrov
- Designed: 1938–41
- Manufacturer: Factory 37, Moscow/Sverdlovsk; GAZ, Gorky; Factory 38, Kirov; Factory 264, Stalingrad
- Produced: 1941–43
- No. built: 594 "T-40" T-60, 5417 "true" + 260 chassis for BM-8-24 (12 "T-40" and 248 "true")

Specifications
- Mass: 5.8 tonnes
- Length: 4.10 m
- Width: 2.30 m
- Height: 1.75 m
- Crew: 2
- Armor: 7–20 mm
- Main armament: 20 mm TNSh cannon (750 rds.)
- Secondary armament: 7.62 mm coax DT machine gun
- Engine: GAZ-202 6-cylinder 70 hp (52 kW)
- Power/weight: 12 hp/tonne
- Suspension: torsion bar
- Fuel capacity: 320 l
- Operational range: 450 km
- Maximum speed: 44 km/h

The T-60 scout tank was a light tank produced by the Soviet Union from 1941 to 1942. During this period, 6,292 units were built. The tank was designed to replace the obsolete T-38 amphibious scout tank and saw action during World War II.

The Kingdom of Romania used the T-60 chassis to build some locally-designed tank destroyers.

== Design ==
Nicholas Astrov's design team at Moscow Factory No. 37 was assigned the task of designing amphibious and non-amphibious scout tanks in 1938. They produced the T-30A and T-30B prototypes. The former was to be manufactured as the T-40 amphibious tank starting in 1940. The T-30B prototype, sharing the T-40's chassis but simpler in construction and with heavier armour, was accepted as the tank that is often known as T-60 scout tank, but it was very different from actual T-60 (often referred as "T-40" T-60/T-30).

Development of the T-60 began in the first days of the German invasion. The new tank was to be a stopgap measure to restock the heavy losses suffered by the tank corps while production lines of the heavier tanks like the T-34 or the KV-1 could not provide tanks of desired reliability in desired quantities. Unlike its heavier siblings, the T-60 was designed to be produced in factories that did not have the machinery for dedicated tank production, such as the GAZ truck plant in Gorky, or the shipbuilding factory №264 in Stalingrad.

Based on the T-40 chassis already in production, the T-60 traded its predecessor's amphibious ability for heavier armour. Furthermore, to make the tank easier to produce, while reconnaissance was still intended as one of the new tank's possible applications, it became the only Soviet tank after the MS-1 never to receive a radio station (despite having a niche for it).

The tank was originally meant to be armed with a 12.7 mm machine gun like the T-40, but on the People's Commissar for Tank Industry Vyacheslav Malyshev's suggestion, it was up-armed by an automatic 20 mm TNSh cannon, a tank version of the ShVAK used on Soviet aircraft, since the weapon was in production in massive quantities easily to rival those of the DShK. Using an aircraft weapon on a ground vehicle presented multiple problems: the cannon easily succumbed to dust and could only penetrate 15 mm of perpendicular armour at 500 m, which proved inadequate against the newer up-armoured German tank designs, thus firmly relegating the T-60 to infantry support role.

The first experimental T-60s were produced by July 1941, but serial production did not begin until the autumn of the same year. However, once priority was given to it at the GAZ, at the expense of truck production, hundreds could be built monthly, total production in 1941 alone reaching more than 1360 units; 1177 of them were built at the Gorky factory. The tanks participated in the 1941 October Revolution Parade and went to be used widely in the defense of Moscow.

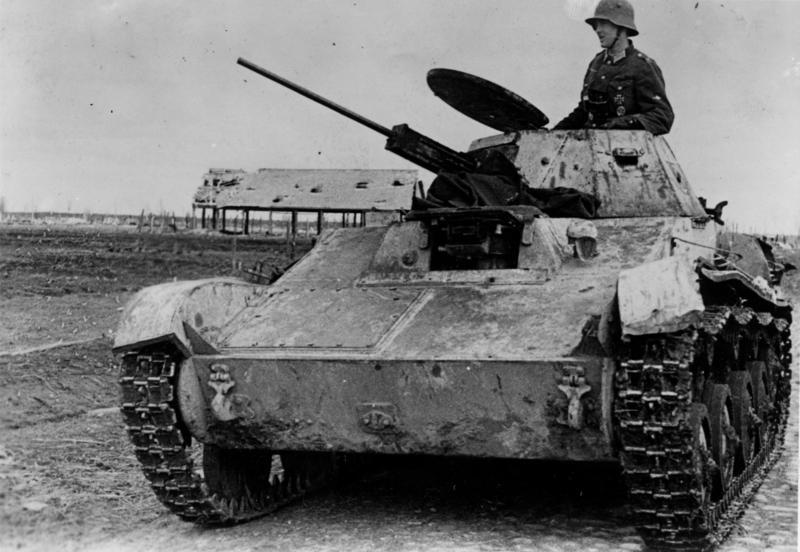
A captured T-60 pressed into German use in the Kholm Pocket.

A number of T-60s were captured and pressed into German use as the Panzerkampfwagen T-60 743(r).

== Further development ==
The shortcomings of the 20 mm autocannon used on the T-60 were apparent, thus attempts were made in 1942 to re-arm the tank with the 37 mm ZIS-19 cannon, but were abandoned due to the Soviet Union's shortage of 37 mm ammunition. Due to this a new project was started to house the standard 45mm tank gun on a modified turret. That became possible, and a new turret was designed and tested successfully in the summer of 1942. The new turret had the gun moved to its right side to make more room for the crew member and a coaxial machine gun was added. Eventually, improvement of the T-60 resulted in the creation of the T-70, an up-armoured and up-gunned version of the tank with the chassis lengthened to fit the new two-engine powerplant.

The Stavka accepted the T-70 as the new standard light tank for the Red Army, and eventually it became the second-most produced tank in the Red Army after the T-34, which replaced it in the tank regiments in November 1943. The T-70 remained in use for reconnaissance or towing artillery, and its chassis became the basis for the most widely-produced light self-propelled gun of the war, the SU-76, as well as light self-propelled anti-aircraft guns, the T-90 and the ZSU-37.

Thus, the history of the T-60 and the vehicles developed from it largely mirrored the fate of the most comparable German tank of the war, the PzKpfw II.

== Gliding tank ==
One T-60 was converted into a glider in 1942 and was designed to be towed by a Petlyakov Pe-8 or Tupolev TB-3 bomber and was to be used to provide partisan forces with light armour. The tank was lightened for air use by removing armament, ammunition, headlights and leaving a very limited amount of fuel. Even with the modifications the TB-3 bomber had to ditch the glider due to the T-60's poor aerodynamics during its only flight to avoid crashing. The T-60 landed on a field near the aerodrome and after dropping the glider wings and tail returned to its base. Due to lack of sufficiently powerful aircraft to tow it the project was cancelled and never resumed.

== Romanian variants ==
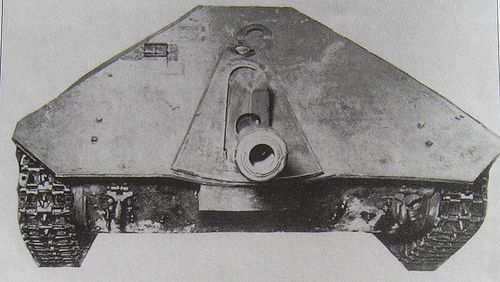
The Romanian Mareșal's first two prototypes used the T-60 chassis

The Romanians modified 34 captured T-60s into TACAM T-60 tank destroyers in 1943. They were armed with captured Soviet F-22 guns housed in a lightly armoured superstructure similar to German Marder II configurations.

The first two prototypes of the Mareșal tank destroyer were based on the T-60 chassis. Later prototypes and the serial production vehicles used new Romanian-designed chassis, but the T-60 suspension (although modified) was used up to the fifth prototype.

== Sources ==
- Miller, Steven (2000). Tanks of the World: From World War I to the Present Day. Osceola, WI: MBI Publishing. ISBN 0-7603-0892-6.
- Zaloga, Steven J.; James Grandsen (1984). Soviet Tanks and Combat Vehicles of World War Two. London: Arms and Armour Press. ISBN 0-85368-606-8.
