= Vitim radar =

Russian OTH radar project

Vitim is a Russian project of a stationary long-range over-the-horizon radar of the UHF wave range by NIIDAR. Positioned as a means of continuous monitoring of the aerospace situation. Provides detection, maintenance and classification of ballistic, space and aerodynamic objects.

Determines the coordinates and motion parameters of ballistic missiles, warheads, AES and ADC, passing through the observation zone; classification of accompanied targets according to the signs of “BR”, “AES” (artificial earth satellites), “ADC” (aerodynamic targets). These are detection, tracking, determination of radiation characteristics, parameters of the trajectory and areas of incidence of active interference sources emitting in the working radar range of the Vitim radar, as well as the formation of typical messages and giving the consumer information about detected and accompanied targets and sources of interference.
