= T-40 tank =

Soviet amphibious light tank

T-40 amphibious scout tank
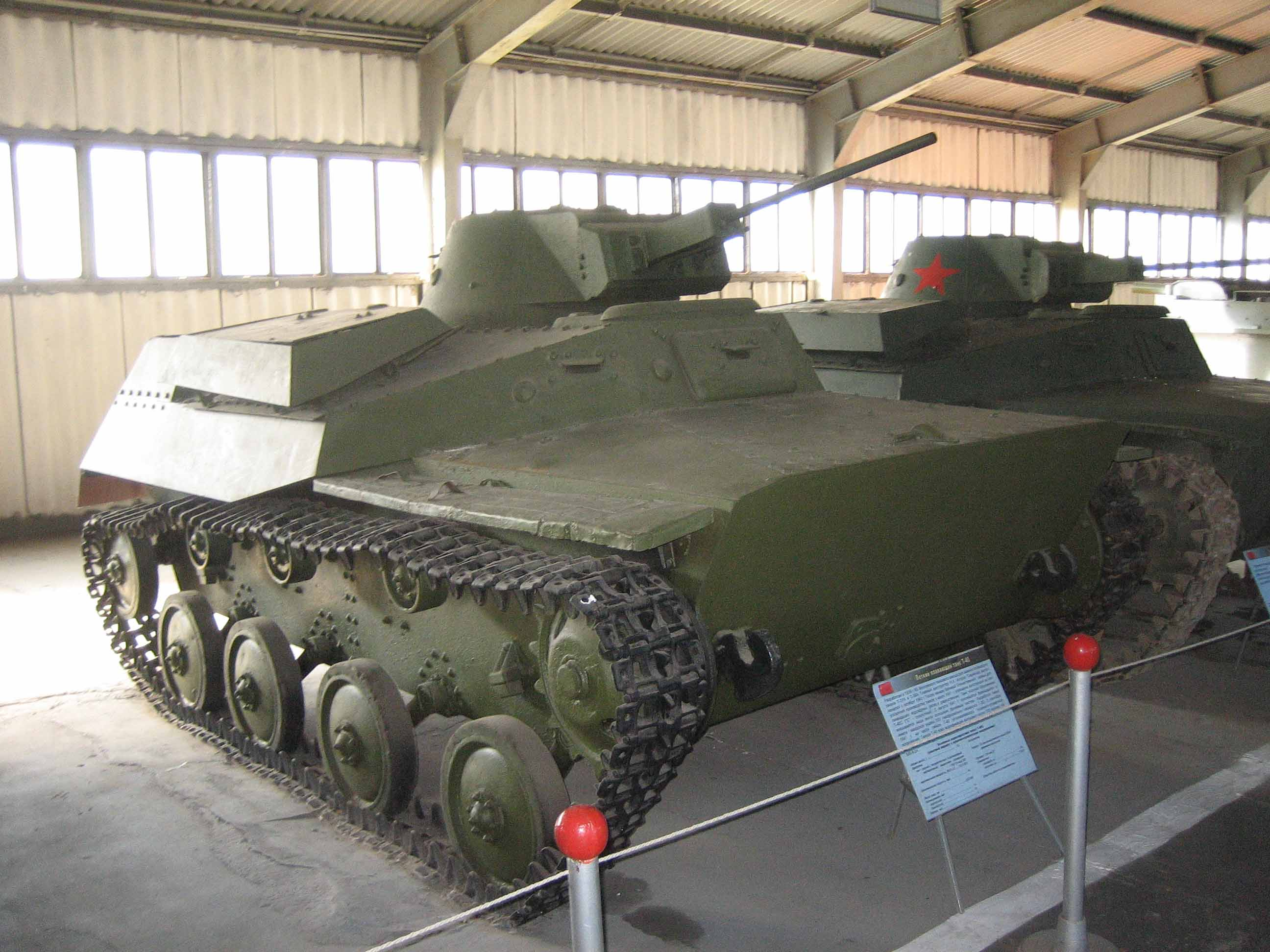
- A normal T-40 rearmed with TNSh autocannon (foreground) and "T-40" T-60 (background) in the Kubinka Tank Museum.
- Type: Amphibious light tank
- Place of origin: Soviet Union

Service history
- In service: 1941–1946
- Used by: Soviet Union
- Wars: World War II

Production history
- Produced: 1940–1941
- No. built: 962 (356 normal, 594 "T-40" T-60 and 12 "T-40" T-60-based rocket launchers)
- Variants: BM-8-24 Katyusha, T-30/"T-40" T-60 light tank

Specifications
- Mass: 5.9 t (6.5 short tons)
- Length: 4.10 m (13.5 ft)
- Width: 2.33 m (7.6 ft)
- Height: 1.90 m (6.2 ft)
- Crew: 2
- Armor: 4–13 mm (0.16–0.51 in)
- Main armament: 12.7 mm (0.50 in) DShK machine gun
- Secondary armament: 7.62 mm (0.300 in) DT machine gun
- Engine: GAZ-202; 85 hp (63 kW)
- Power/weight: 12 hp/tonne
- Suspension: torsion bar
- Operational range: 450 km (280 mi)
- Maximum speed: 45 km/h (28 mph)

The T-40 amphibious scout tank was an amphibious light tank used by the Soviet Union during World War II. It was armed with one 12.7 mm (0.5 in) DShK machine gun. It was one of the few tanks that could cross an unfordable river without a bridge.

It was primarily intended to equip reconnaissance units. A land-based version of the T-40, the T-30/"T-40" T-60, was produced, although was later replaced by the "true" T-60. The T-60 was cheaper, simpler, better-armed, and could fulfill most of the same roles, so T-40 production was halted.

The vehicle served mainly in Operation Barbarossa and the defense of Moscow, and it was rarely seen after that point, although it was used in Soviet training schools until 1946. A total 12 examples of the type were later fitted with Katyusha rocket launchers, firing 82 mm unguided rockets from a 24-rail launcher.

== Importance ==
Amphibious capability was important to the Red Army, as evidenced by the production of over 1,500 amphibious tanks in the 1930s. The T-40 was intended to replace the aging T-37 and T-38 amphibious light tanks. It was a superior design, but due to the pressures of war the Soviets favored the production of simpler tank designs, so only a small number of T-40s were built.

== Development ==
The T-40 was an improvement over the T-37 and T-38 in several respects. The coil-spring suspension of the T-38 was replaced by a modern torsion-bar suspension with four pairs of road wheels. The boat-shaped hull was entirely welded, in contrast to the riveted hulls of the T-37 and T-38. The welded, conical turret shape improved protection, although the armor was still very thin. The vehicle's armament consisted of a single 12.7 mm DShK heavy machine gun, which was a much more potent weapon than the 7.62 mm DT machine gun mounted on the T-37 and the T-38.

Water propulsion was achieved via a small propeller mounted at the rear of the hull. The propeller was set into an indent in the hull rear, and was thus better protected than the exposed propeller of the T-38. Buoyancy was provided by the large boat-shaped hull.

== Production ==
The T-40 entered production just prior to the outbreak of war, and was intended to equip reconnaissance units. As the need for large numbers of tanks became critical, a secondary non-amphibious variant was designed on the T-40 chassis. Due to delays with design of newer model, T-40 was modified to have thicker armor, 20 mm TNSh autocannon, simpler spoken wheels and absent water propulsion system. This design was called T-60, like a different later tank, which led to many confusions, so this tank is often referred as "T-40" T-60 or T-30 (as its blueprint index was 030). The "T-40" T-60 replaced T-40 in September 1941 and was manufactured until summer 1942 along with the "true" T-60. This design was later improved to become the "true" T-60. The T-60 was simpler, cheaper, better armed, and could fulfill most of the same roles. Under the stress of war, production of the T-40 was halted in favor of the T-60. Thus only 356 T-40s were issued, compared to 594 "T-40" T-60s and over 6,000 "true" T-60s.

A small batch of "T-40" T-60 were produced with BM-8-24 Katyusha rocket racks mounted instead of a turret. This version provided a mobile mount for a 24-rail multiple-launch rocket system, firing 82 mm unguided rockets. A total of 12 T-40 were converted into this model in autumn 1941.

The T-40 was widely photographed at the time of Operation Barbarossa and also during the defence of Moscow. Many were knocked out during the fighting. The type was very rarely seen after the end of 1941, although some T-40s remained in service as late 1946 in some school units.

Romanian forces captured one T-40 as of 1 November 1942.

== Variants ==
- T-40
- T-30
