= William J. Thaler =

William J. Thaler, Ph.D. (December 4, 1925 – June 5, 2005) was an American experimental physicist. Working for the Office of Naval Research (ONR) at the Naval Research Laboratory in the 1950s, Thaler developed an early warning system to detect the launching of ballistic missiles using high frequency radio waves bounced between the Earth's surface and the ionosphere, part of the upper atmosphere.

Monitoring the disruption of the returning radio waves, called back-scatter, allowed for the long distance detection of rocket launchings and nuclear tests. Based in the Washington D.C. area, the experimental monitoring systems, termed "over-the-horizon radar", were able to pick up radio disruptions from nuclear tests held in Nevada and were later successful in tracking a Polaris missile fired from Cape Canaveral.

== Education ==
Thaler attended St. James Parochial School in Baltimore and Loyola High School in Towson, MD. He received his undergraduate degree from Loyola College of Baltimore in 1947 and earned his master's degree in science at The Catholic University of America. He received his doctorate in physics at Catholic University in 1951.

== Operation Argus ==
In 1958, Thaler was in charge of the ONR section of Operation Argus, a secret series of tests conducted over the Atlantic Ocean that looked at the effect of high-altitude detonations of nuclear weapons on radar and radio transmissions.

== Later career ==
In late 1960, Thaler joined the faculty of Georgetown University, expanded the Physics department and chaired the department from 1960 to 1976. From 1976 to 1979, he took a leave of absence to serve as chief scientist and director of the Office of Telecommunications Policy, within the Executive Office of the President, in the Ford and Carter administrations. He returned to Georgetown University and retired in 1996.

== Awards ==
In 1960, Thaler was awarded the Mendel Medal by Villanova University. This honor "is awarded to outstanding scientists who have done much by their painstaking work to advance the cause of science, and, by their lives and their standing before the world as scientists, have demonstrated that between true science and true religion there is no intrinsic conflict."

== Personal life ==
Thaler was married to Barbara Thaler and had six children, two of whom preceded him in death.

== Death ==
Thaler died of complications resulting from a stroke at his home in Centreville, Virginia. He was 79 years old.
