= Container radar =

Russian over-the-horizon radar system

29B6 Container
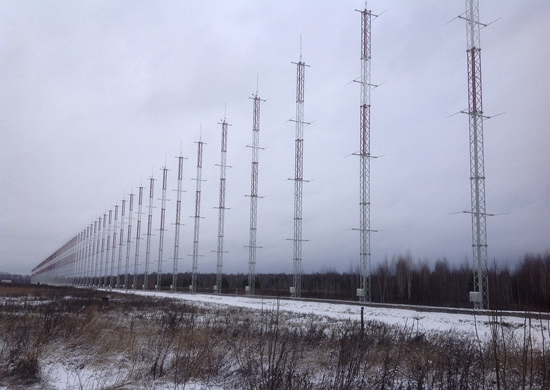
- Country of origin: Russia
- Introduced: 2 December 2013
- No. built: 2 operational in 2026, at least 1 other planned
- Type: Over-the-horizon radar
- Frequency: 3-30 MHz (HF)
- PRF: 40-50 pulse/s
- Range: Around 3,000 kilometres (1,864 mi)
- Other names: 29B6

Container (29B6) radar (Russian: 29Б6 «Контейнер») is the new generation of Russian over-the-horizon radar, providing long distance airspace monitoring and ballistic missile detection. The first radar, near Kovylkino, Mordovia, Russia, became operational in December 2013 and entered combat duty on 1 December, 2019. A second radar began construction in 2021 near the town of Zeya, Amur Oblast.

Another Container radar is planned to be deployed in Kaliningrad.

== Description ==
The radar can monitor the airspace up to 100 km altitude and has a 3,000 km range. It was developed by NPK NIIDAR, which is also a developer of Voronezh-DM radar. The chief designer was Valentin Strelkin, and the system's price was 10 billion rubles.

The system consists of two separate antenna arrays: one for the transmitter and one for the receiver. The receiver antenna array contains 144 antenna masts, each 34 m high. The array has three sections: The inner section is 900 m wide with a 7 m spacing between masts, and the two outer sections are each 200 m wide with a 14 m spacing. The total array width is 1,300 m. The receiver station has three arrays, arranged in an equilateral triangle. The transmitter antenna array has 36 re-configurable masts and is 440 m wide.

Radar signals were detected by some amateur radio operators in the 9.2–19.745 MHz frequency band. Pulse repetition rate is 40 pulses per second, bandwidth about 14 kHz, frequency modulation on pulse (FMOP) is used. The received signal has a sound similar to the Soviet early warning system Duga radar operated from 1976–1989, nicknamed "the Russian woodpecker".

== Location ==
The receiving antennas are located 8 km south-west from Kovylkino, Mordovia, Russia 53.9841°N 43.8427°E. The transmitters' antennas were initially located 300 km from the receiver, 5 km north of Gorodets town, Nizhegorodskaya oblast', Russia 56.69328°N 43.48625°E. The site has been dismantled since at least February 2018, the new receivers are now located 15 km to the southeast 53.8832°N 43.9928°E. The system is aligned on a bearing of 095° and 275° to monitor airspace west of Russia, the Mediterranean Sea, and the Black Sea region.

A second deployment site began construction in 2022 near the town of Zeya, Oblast Amur, Russia, 53.720556°N 127.074167°E; with initial clearing Operation starting in 2017, as visible on satellite images retrievable via Google Earth.
