= Sugar Tree radar =

Over-the-horizon radar built by the US in the 1960s

Sugar Tree is the name of a bistatic over-the-horizon radar built by the US in the 1960s. The key idea in Sugar Tree was a reinvention of the Klein Heidelberg Nazi German passive radar system developed for use in the Second World War. Sugar Tree was a "covert hitchhiker using Soviet, surface-wave HF radio broadcast signals and a remote sky-wave receiver to detect Soviet ballistic missile launches". The key idea, in other words, is to receive radar reflections without oneself transmitting a radar signal by using instead some other signal, typically one that originates from the adversary.
