= T-38 tank =

Soviet amphibious light tank

T-38 amphibious scout tank
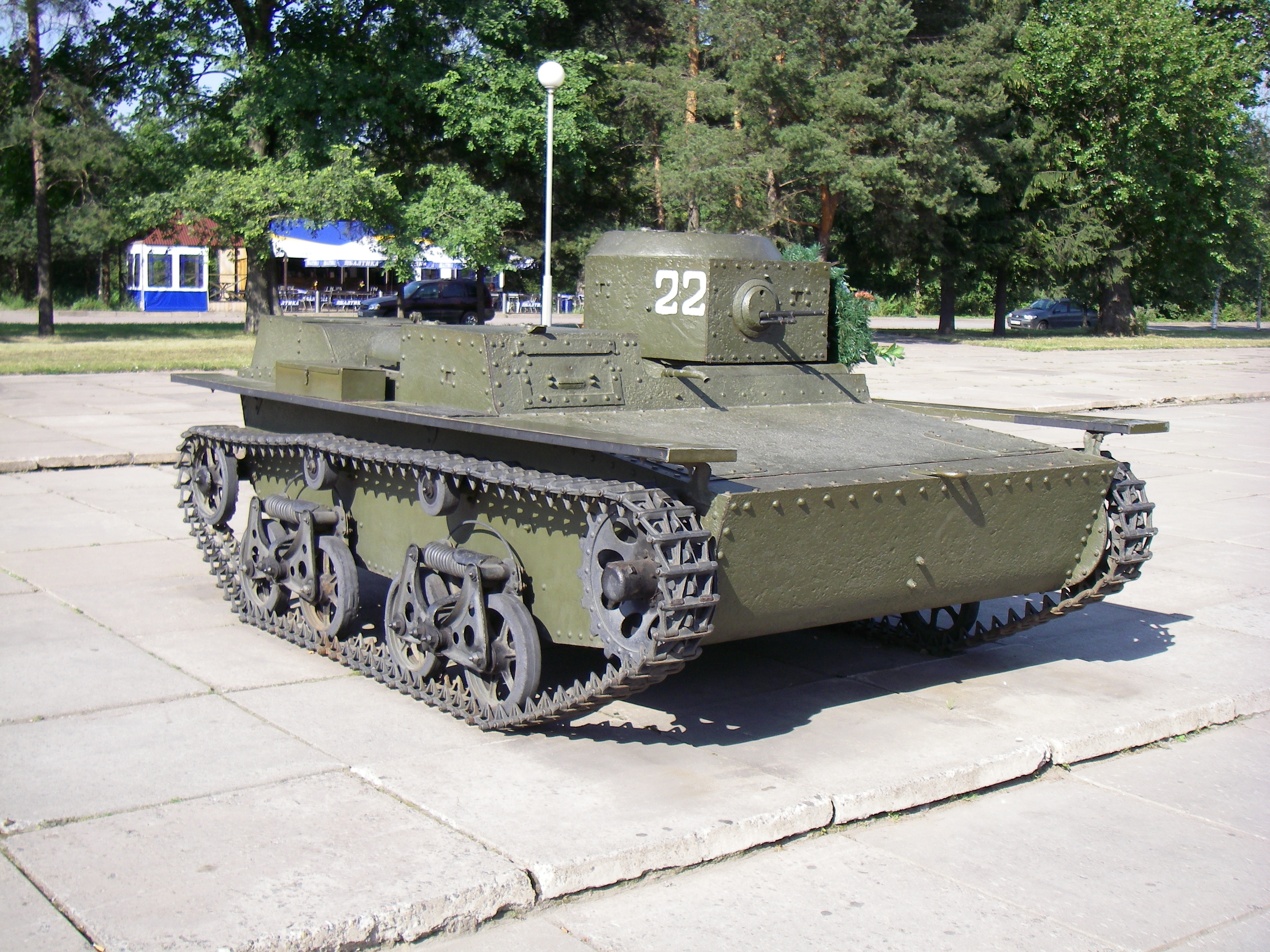
- T-38 tank
- Type: Amphibious light tank
- Place of origin: Soviet Union

Service history
- In service: 1937–1943
- Used by: Soviet Union; Romania (captured)
- Wars: World War II

Production history
- Designer: Nicholay Astrov & N. Kozyrev, Factory No. 37, Moscow
- Designed: 1934–1936
- Manufacturer: Factory No. 37
- Produced: 1937–1939
- No. built: 1,340

Specifications
- Mass: 3.3 tonnes
- Length: 3.78 m
- Width: 2.10 m
- Height: 1.63 m
- Crew: 2
- Armour: 3–9 mm
- Main armament: 7.62mm DT machine gun
- Engine: GAZ-AA 4-cylinder inline gasoline engine 40 hp (30 kW)
- Power/weight: 12 hp/tonne
- Suspension: horizontally sprung scissor bogie
- Operational range: 170 km
- Maximum speed: 40 km/h

The T-38 amphibious scout tank was a Soviet amphibious and reconnaissance light tank that saw service in World War II. Developed as a modernized version of the earlier T-37A light tank, which had roots in the British Vickers amphibious tank, it also took design ideas from the French AMR 33, the T-38 proved to be only a moderate improvement over its predecessor. Its relative light weight allowed Soviet aircraft to strap the tank on bomber fuselages, and deliver them to front lines. Deeply flawed, reluctance or inability to upgrade the tank's drivetrain, weapons, and radio led to its eventual replacement in 1940, by the T-40.

== History ==
Early trials of the T-37A revealed many deficiencies in its design, including limited range, sub-par buoyancy, and an unreliable transmission and running gear that could cause its tracks to fall off while on the move. Development of an improved version of the tank that would fix these flaws was begun in late 1934 at Factory No. 37 in Moscow, under the direction of Chief Designer N. Astrov and Chief Engineer N. Kozyrev. The redesign proved to be so extensive that the project was given the independent designation T-38, and a prototype was completed by June 1935.

The T-38 retained many design features of the T-37A, including its repurposed GAZ-AA engine and hand-operated turret. The turret was moved from the right to the left-hand side of the tank, switching the driver and commander positions compared to the T-37A. The T-38 also had a slightly wider and lower profile than its predecessor, providing an advantage in buoyancy that made the cork buoys used on the T-37A unnecessary. While the production-model T-38 was only armed with a 7.62mm DT machine gun, the initial prototype vehicle also included a 20mm ShVAK cannon mounted on the driver's position. This was removed after it was determined the additional cannon impaired the driver's ability to control the tank.

Like other light tanks of its time, the T-38 was designed for reconnaissance and infantry support roles. As a scout tank the T-38 had the advantages of a very low silhouette and good long-range mobility through its ability to swim. The T-38 was also intended to be air-portable; during the Kiev maneuvers in 1936, the tanks were transported by Tupolev TB-3 bombers, mounted under the fuselage. Infantry battalions were each issued 38 T-38s, with 50 being designated for each airborne armored battalions. However, the thin armor and single machinegun armament made the tank of only limited use in combat and the lack of a radio in most T-38s was a serious limitation for a reconnaissance vehicle. The T-38 also struggled with carrying any excess cargo across water. The tank was incapable of supporting the weight of two infantrymen while floating, and overloads of 120-150 kilos would cause the commander's hatch to flood, sinking the vehicle. These flaws were to be fixed by the T-38's successor, the T-40, but only a small number were built before the outbreak of World War II, leaving the T-37A and T-38 to form the bulk of the Red Army's amphibious tanks.

A total of 1,228 T-38 tanks were built from 1936 to 1937, with an additional 112 made in 1939 after a two-year break in production.

== Service history ==
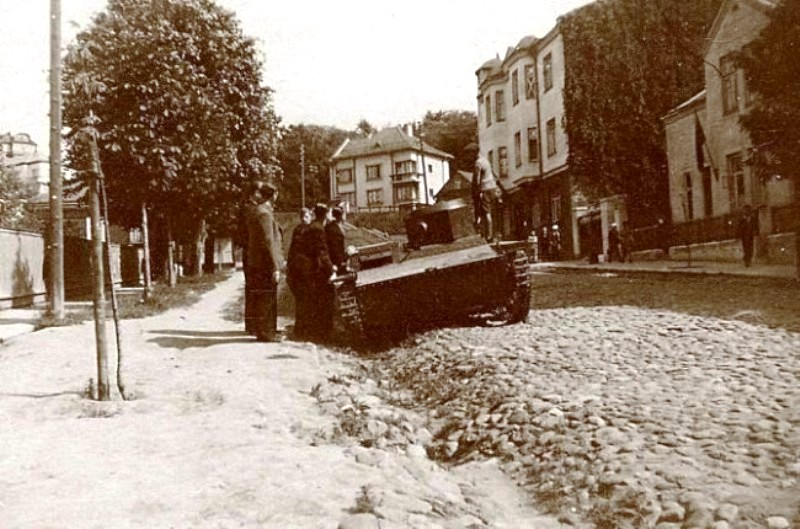
T-38 of the Red Army captured by the LAF fighters in Kaunas, Lithuania

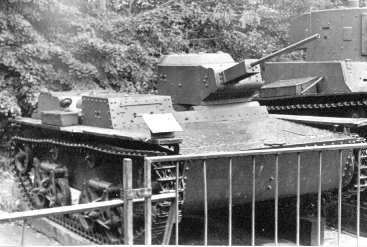
T-38 armed with 20 mm cannon on display at the Central Armed Forces Museum in Moscow.

The tank served with the Red Army in the Winter War with Finland in 1940, but was unsuccessful due to its light armament and thin armour, which was easily penetrated by rifle and light machine gun fire. In the confined terrain of Finland, the tank was a deathtrap; it also did not do well in the early stages of World War II, and large numbers were captured by the Germans during Operation Barbarossa. The T-38 was rarely seen in direct combat after 1941 and mostly relegated to other roles such as artillery tractor, although it was reported to have been used in the Dnieper River crossing of 1943. During World War II, the main amphibious scout vehicle of the Red Army was the Ford GPA amphibious jeep, an open unarmored vehicle provided through Lend-Lease.

The German Army did not generally use captured T-38s as gun tanks (unlike captured T-26s, T-34s, or other more valuable vehicles).

Romanian forces had captured three T-38s as of 1 November 1942 and four more in March 1944.

== Variants ==
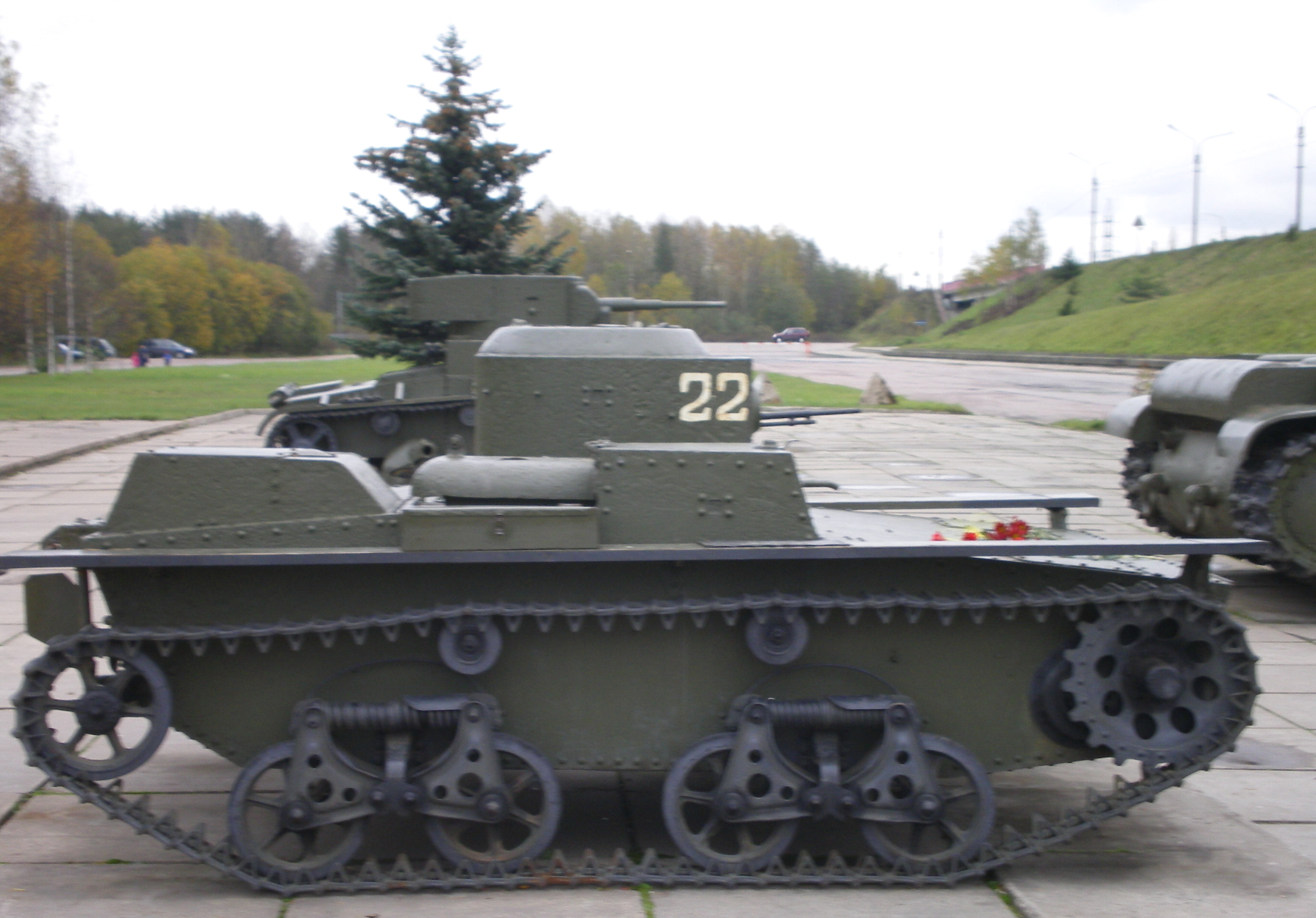
T-38 on display at the Breakthrough of the Siege of Leningrad Museum near St. Petersburg

- T-38RT (1937), version equipped with 71-TK-1 radio.
- OT-38 (1937), flamethrower-equipped version, prototype only.
- T-38M1 (1937), prototype with superior planetary transmission, considered too complex for production.
- T-38M2 (1938), modification improving the gearbox and replacing the engine with GAZ M1. 10 pilot series tanks built, rejected in favor of T-40.
- T-38TU, command version with extra radio antenna.
- SU-45 (1936), experimental 45 mm self-propelled gun.
- T-38TT (1939), experimental remotely controlled tank (teletank).
- T-38 with ShVAK (1944), upgrade of existing tanks with ShVAK cannons reused from T-40 or T-60 tanks. Approximately 120 converted, including identically converted T-37A, nothing is known about their service.

== See also ==
=== Comparable vehicles ===
- Germany: Panzer I
- Italy: L3/33 • L3/35
- Japan: Type 94
- Poland: TK-3 and TKS
- Romania: R-1
- Soviet Union: T-27 • T-37A
- Sweden: Strv m/37
- United Kingdom: Light Tank Mk VI

== Bibliography ==
- Baryatinskiy, Mikhail (2006) Light Tanks: T-27, T-38, BT, T-26, T-40, T-50, T-60, T-70. Hersham, Surrey: Ian Allan Publishing. ISBN 0-7110-3163-0
- Bean, Tim; Fowler, Will (2002). Russian Tanks of World War II: Stalin's Armored Might. MBI. ISBN 0760313024.
- Bishop, Chris (1998) The Encyclopedia of Weapons of World War II
- Chamberlain, Peter & Chris Ellis (1972) Tanks of the World, 1915-1945
- Fleischer, Wolfgang (1999) Russian Tanks and Armored Vehicles 1917-1945
- Milsom, John (1970) Russian Tanks, 1900-1970 ISBN 0-88365-052-5
- Zaloga, Steven J.; James Grandsen (1984). Soviet Tanks and Combat Vehicles of World War Two. London: Arms and Armour Press. ISBN 0-85368-606-8.
