= T-37A tank =

Soviet amphibious light tank

T-37А amphibious scout tank
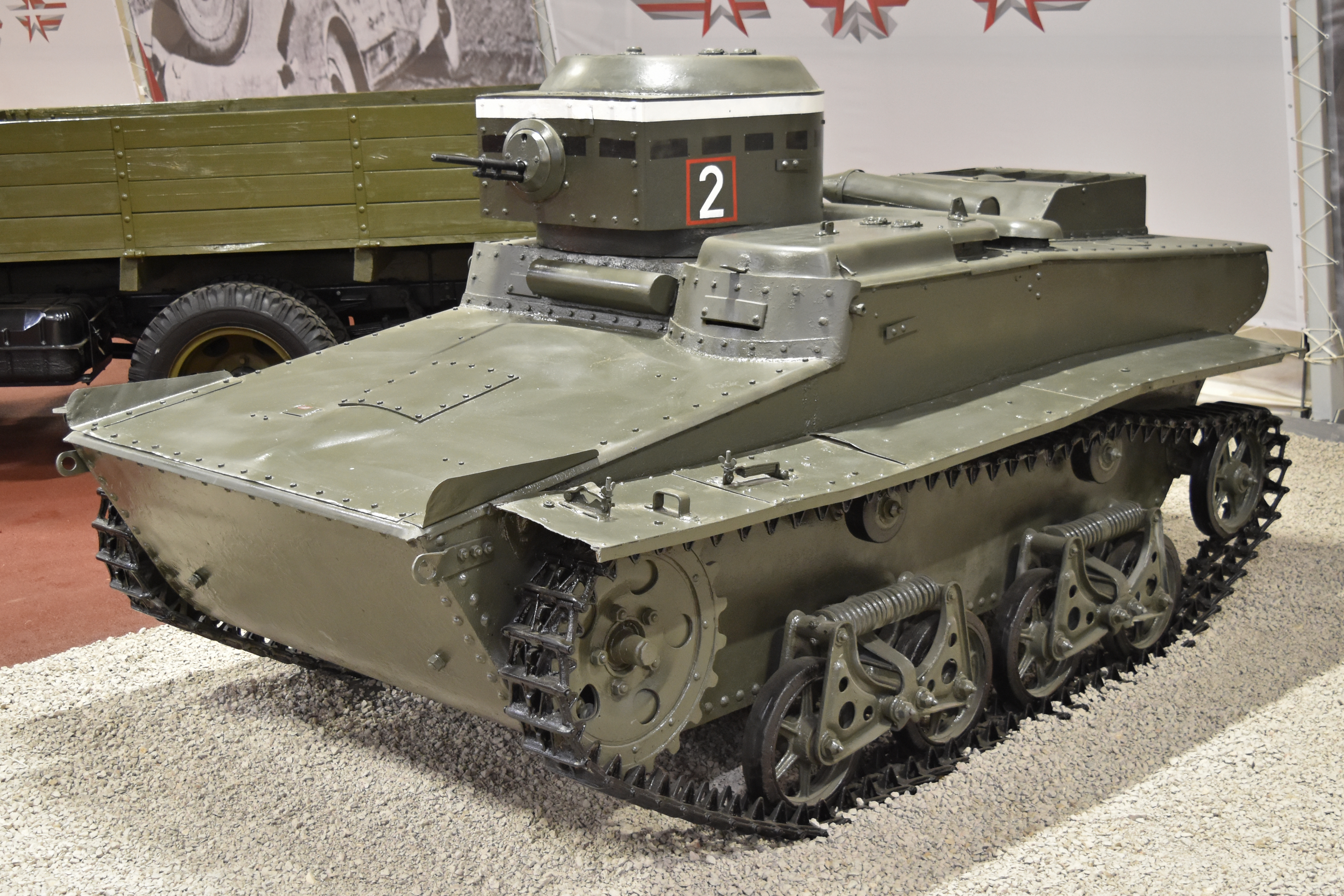
- T-37А, displayed in Kubinka Tank Museum
- Type: Amphibious light tank
- Place of origin: Soviet Union

Service history
- In service: From 1933
- Used by: Soviet Union; Finland (captured); Romania (captured); Nazi Germany (captured); Hungary (captured)

Production history
- Designer: N. Kozyrev, Factory No. 37, Moscow
- Designed: 1931–33
- Produced: 1933–36
- No. built: ~1,200
- Variants: T-37A (main production), T-37TU command tank, M1936

Specifications (T-37)
- Mass: 3.2 tonnes
- Length: 3.75 m (12 ft 4 in)
- Width: 2.10 m (6 ft 11 in)
- Height: 1.82 m (6 ft 0 in)
- Crew: 2
- Armour: 3–9 mm
- Main armament: 7.62mm DT machine gun (585 rounds)
- Engine: GAZ-AA; 40 hp (30 kW)
- Power/weight: 13 hp/tonne
- Suspension: horizontally sprung scissor bogie
- Fuel capacity: 100 litres
- Operational range: 185 km
- Maximum speed: 35 km/h (22 mph)

The T-37A was a Soviet amphibious light tank. The tank is often referred to as the T-37, although that designation was used by a different tank which never left the prototype stage. The T-37A was the first series of mass-produced fully amphibious tanks in the world.

The tank was first created in 1932, based on the British Vickers tankette and other operational amphibious tanks. The tank was mass-produced starting in 1933 up until 1936, when it was replaced with the more modern T-38, based on the T-37A. Overall, after four years of production, 2552 T-37As were produced, including the original prototypes.

In the Red Army, they were used to perform tasks in communication, reconnaissance, and as defense units on the march, as well as active infantry support on the battlefield. The T-37A was used in large numbers during the Soviet invasion of Poland and in the Winter War against Finland. T-37As were also used by the Soviets in the beginning of the Great Patriotic War, but most of them were quickly lost. Surviving tanks fought on the front lines until 1944, and were used in training and auxiliary defense until the end of World War II.

== Early history ==
The Carden-Loyd tankettes by Carden-Loyd Tractors, Ltd., were promising enough that the company was purchased by Vickers-Armstrong. They developed light, floating tanks to General Staff requirements (A4E11 etc). In April 1931, Vickers-Armstrongs conducted several successful tests of these light vehicles in the presence of the press. Publication of the design and testing by the press attracted the attention of the Department of Motorization and Mechanization of the Workers'–Peasants' Red Army (UMMRKKA), because the small tank was well suited to the new armament policies of the Red Army, as well as possibly being able to replace the older T-27 tankette, which never performed well in combat. At the Bolshevik OKMO plant in Leningrad, from the All Russian Co-Operative Society (Arcos), newspapers were handed in containing information about the British tankette, as well as photographs and technical specifications. Based on this information, Soviet engineers found out that the power plant of the Carden-Loyd tankette was originally from a light tractor produced by the company, and thus the overall layout must be similar. Accordingly, the Selezen ("Drake", Ru. Селезень) program was established in order to construct a similar amphibious tank with a layout based on that of the British prototype. The first Selezen prototype, which was designated the T-33, was built in March 1932 and showed good buoyancy during testing. However, the T-33 did not perform satisfactorily in other tests and was too complicated to produce. As a result, it was not mass produced or equipped in large numbers.

=== T-41 and T-37 ===
Even before the construction of the T-33, it was decided to increase the scale of work dedicated to creating an amphibious tank. In addition to the Leningrad OKMO, the Number 2 plant of the All-Soviet Automotive Union (VATO), which was already producing armored vehicles for the Red Army, was relegated to the development and production of amphibious armored vehicles. As a result, at the 2nd VATO plant, under the supervision of N. N. Kozyrev, the T-41 amphibious tank was produced, weighing 3.5 tons and using the GAZ-AA engine, (Note: before the engines could be produced at GAZ plants, they had to be salvaged from imported Ford Model AA) which was based on the T-27 power plant. The transmission was nearly identical to that of the T-27, and to the power take-off for the propeller, they added a rigid gear clutch. Its construction for turning off the propeller demanded stopping the tank and turning off the engine. The chassis was, in part, borrowed from the T-33, and the caterpillar tracks were entirely from the T-27. Leningrad builders likewise continued the development of a more suitable amphibious tank, and they designated their latest model as the “T-37”. It had the same GAZ AA engine as the T-41, the same transmission, wide use of automotive parts, and the Krupp chassis, which Soviet engineers first encountered as a result of a technological partnership with Weimar Germany. Although the T-41 was actually produced for the military in small numbers, after testing and battlefield trials the T-37 was denied production due to various minor faults and an incomplete development process.

=== Deals with Vickers ===
Meanwhile, an opportunity to fully analyze the British prototype itself appeared. The British Army declined to put the Vickers prototype into service (although they were used as trials vehicles), and so the company decided to look for foreign buyers. Already interested since the April 1931 demonstration, the USSR, on February 5, 1932, made an offer, through Arcos representative Y. Skvirskiy, for the purchase of eight vehicles. Talks about filling the order did not drag on, and by June 1932, Vickers had already produced and shipped two of the first tanks for the Soviets.

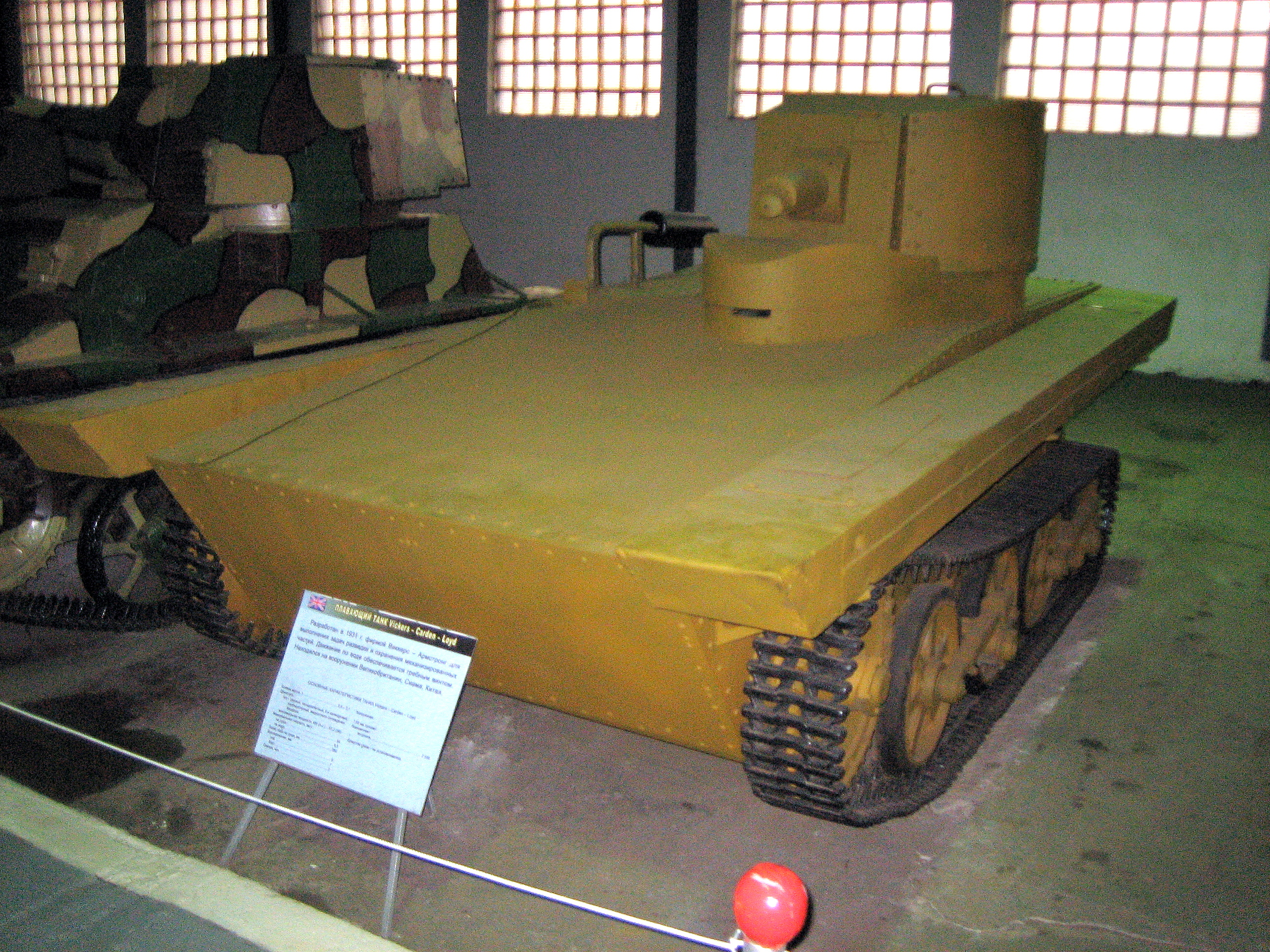
The Vickers-Carden-Loyd floating tank.

It is widely thought that the T-37A was a copy of the Vickers floating tank, (Note: For example, статья М. Барятинского, where it is stated that the T-37 was a development of the T-33, which, in turn, "differs little from the English prototype". However, the T-33 was created before the purchase of the British tanks, and has an entirely different power system, and the general layout of the chassis and transmission of the British and Soviet tanks have several significant differences.) with the Soviet purchase of such tanks in mind. However, closer examination of the turn of events leads to the discrediting of such a theory, but it is true that the Soviet T-37A prototypes were heavily influenced by the British models. Nikolai Astrov, a Soviet engineer, having worked hard on the T-37A prototypes, wrote in his memoirs that "peace be unto the T-37A, born “Vickers-Carden-Loyd."

== Serial production ==
Even before the end of 1932, the high command of the Red Army was planning to order 30 T-37A’s. In order to facilitate faster production, Factory No. 37 (that is what the No. 2 VATO plant was renamed) was handed over all OKMO production related to the T-37, as well as one British Vickers tank. In 1933, the No. 37 plant was given an order of 1200 T-37A’s. However, the events that followed showed the excessive optimism shown by the leadership of the trust responsible for the factory. The trust itself was formed as a governing organ for coordinating large-scale efforts to develop new models of armored vehicles in a number of plants across the country, and subsequently played a significant role in the successful carrying out of this task, but at the beginning of 1933 it couldn’t overcome the “antediluvian” state of equipment at the No. 37 plant, as assessed by M. N. Svirin, purely with organizational measures.

=== Problems with production ===
By its technological design, the T-37A was much more complicated than the T-27 tankette, which immediately caused complications not only at Factory No. 37, but to its subcontractor – the Podolsk Electric Locomotive Plant, which was producing the hulls of the new T-37A’s. In addition, in 1933 the T-27 tankette was still being produced, which stressed the lack of adequate resources needed to produce both vehicles simultaneously. This only worsened the situation and slowed the introduction of the T-37A. The technology for producing stamped cemented armor plates at the Podolsk plant was completely unrefined; the desired result had to be achieved using improvised and primitive methods. In the end, in the first half of 1933 the Factory No. 37 built 30 amphibious tanks (12 of which were T-41’s) instead of the 255 needed to fulfill the established plan. The then replacement People’s Defense Commissioner Mikhail Tukhochevsky wrote in his report “of the progress of completion of the tank program in the first half of 1933”:

Reasons for the unfulfillment [of the]… T-37 tank program:

- Failure of the “Podolsk KrekIng” factory to produce the hulls;
- An unready and unrefined technological manufacturing process;
- Unsatisfactory steel casting quality…

… The Podolsk factory. The program for producing the T-27 hulls was fully completed. The T-37A program has, instead of 250, produced only one workable hull in this half of the year. The main reason for this situation is the transfer [of the hulls] to the stamping and cementation without serious enough preventive and preparative measures. At this time, it can be said that the factory has mastered the stamping process. The further completion of the program depends on the timely shipment of armor plates from the Kulebakskiy factory before May. It cannot produce and ship the armor in June due to a lack of ferroalloys. Currently, the factory has the necessary materials and has started to produce an armor sheet…

The situation didn’t change during the second half of 1933; the leadership of the Army and Spetzmashtrest, the governing trust, demanded large amounts of T-37A’s to be produced at Factory No. 37, expecting to receive no more than 800 tanks. In reality, only 126 T-37A’s had been produced by 1 January 1934, two of which had built-in radios. Some of the tanks participated in a military parade on 7 November 1933 at the Red Square in Moscow. The early T-37A’s did not differ much from the later, series-produced tanks – the earlier ones lacked wave-diffusing shields and floats.

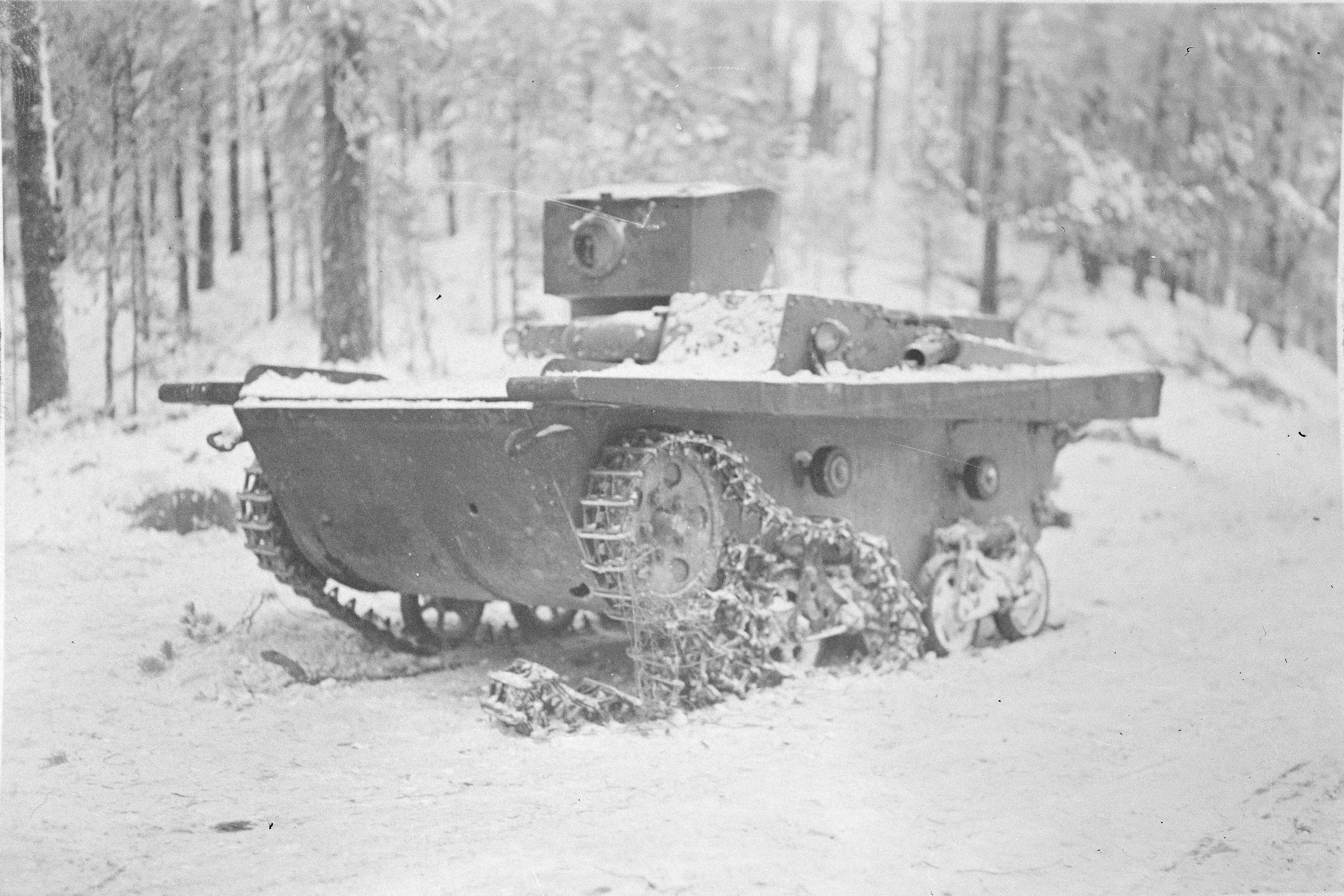
Soviet T-37A destroyed during the Winter War with Finland.

In 1934, the leadership of the Spetzmashtrest lent its attention to improving the conditions in the factories at which the tanks were produced. They purchased foreign equipment for two new wings of the No. 37 Factory, as well as increasing the number of workers and engineering/ technical personnel. These measures, however, did not improve the situation; the number of assembled tanks was significantly lower than planned. The Office of Motorization and Mechanization of the Red Army noted the insufficiency of the technical and general management at the No. 37 plant, and a lack of planning during the production process and "storming through" the operation. As a result, mid 1934 was marked by a change in leadership of the plant, and only towards the end of the year there had been a positive trend in the manufacturing process. Also, in 1934, slight changes were made to the T-37A design: the thickness of the sides and the front were increased to 10 mm, the curved stern piece hulls were replaced with stamped ones, and the over-track floats were rolled back and stuffed with cork, and they have become empty on the inside.

The production of hulls remained as a limiting factor in the following year of 1935. The Podolsk Electric Locomotive Plant consistently failed to fulfill the plans for the production of parts in adequate numbers. To solve the problem, a year prior, it was decided to use the T-37A Izhorsky plant in Leningrad for additional hull production. But this enterprise, although there was considerable capacity, has been directed other orders for armored cars for the needs of Navy of the Soviet Union, as well as the production of hulls for the Leningrad plants producing armored cars and T-26 and T-28 tanks. As a result, most of the hulls of T-37A were sent to the № 37 plant from Podolsk. Hulls from different manufacturers had various methods of production: Izhorsk hulls were welded, and Podolsk hulls riveted. For a permanent solution to the production of hulls for amphibious tanks, engineers restructured them and altered the power plants.

=== Memorial November parade 2011 ===
A detachment of tanks including three T-37s were shown in pass-through on Red Square on November 7, 2011, commemorating 70th anniversary of famous 1941 parade.

== Operators ==
- USSR
- (Nazi Germany) Germany - A small number of captured tanks were used
- Finland - 29 tanks
- Romania - At least 19 tanks
- Hungary - Some captured tanks
- Sweden - One tank gifted by Finland, for brief evaluation only
- Turkey - 1 T-37A [1934-194?].

== Comparable vehicles ==
- Germany: Panzer I
- Italy: L3/33 • L3/35
- Japan: Type 94
- Poland: TK-3 and TKS
- Romania: R-1
- Soviet Union: T-27 • T-38
- Sweden: Strv m/37
- United Kingdom: Light Tank Mk VI

== Notes ==
Notes

Citations
