= Over-the-horizon radar =

Long distance radar technology

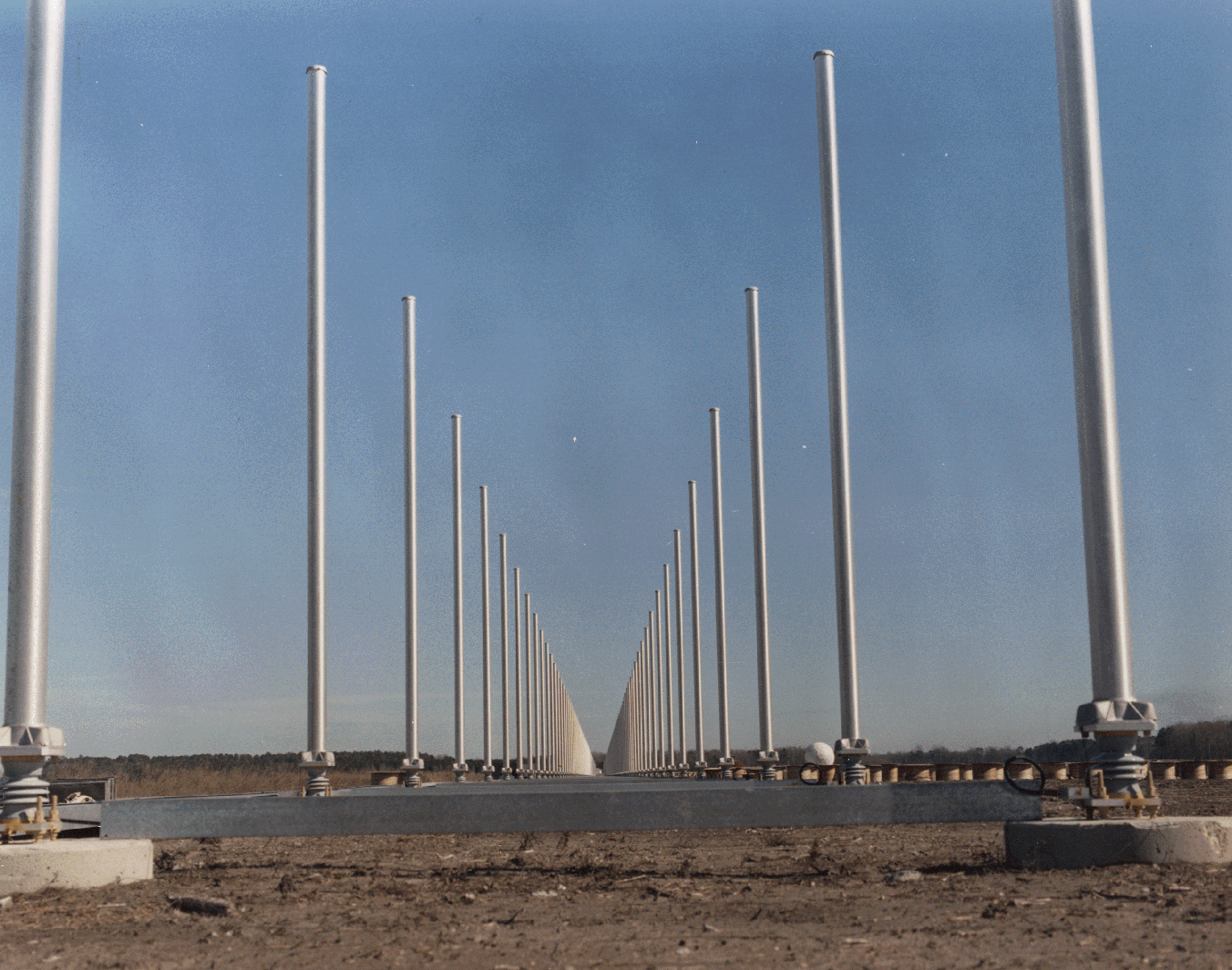
U.S. Navy Relocatable Over-the-Horizon Radar station

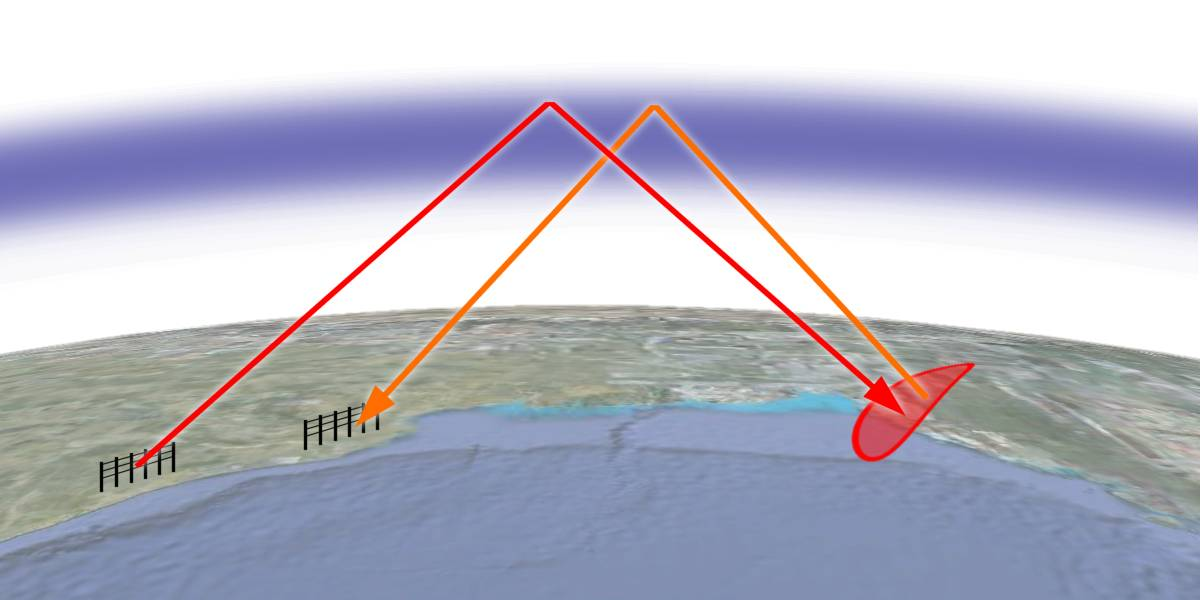
How a skywave OTH radar works: A powerful shortwave signal from a large transmitting antenna (left) reaches a target beyond the horizon by refracting off the ionosphere, and the echo signal from the target (right) returns to the receiving antenna by the same route. In practice, the beams are much closer to the horizon than shown here.

Over-the-horizon radar (OTH), sometimes called beyond the horizon radar (BTH), is a type of radar system with the ability to detect targets at very long ranges, typically hundreds to thousands of kilometres, beyond the radar horizon, which is the distance limit for ordinary radar. Several OTH radar systems were deployed starting in the 1950s and 1960s as part of early-warning radar systems, but airborne early warning systems have generally replaced these. OTH radars have recently been making a comeback, as the need for accurate long-range tracking has become less important since the ending of the Cold War, and less-expensive ground-based radars are once again being considered for roles such as maritime reconnaissance and drug enforcement.

== Technology ==
The frequency of radio waves used by most radars, microwaves, propagate in straight lines. This generally limits the detection range of radar systems to objects on their horizon (generally referred to as "line of sight" since the aircraft must be at least theoretically visible to a person at the location and elevation of the radar transmitter) due to the curvature of the Earth. For example, a radar mounted on top of a 10 m (33 ft) mast has a range to the horizon of about 13 kilometres (8.1 mi), considering atmospheric refraction effects. If the target is above the surface, this range will be increased accordingly, so a target 10 m (33 ft) high can be detected by the same radar at 26 km (16 mi). Siting the antenna on a high mountain can increase the range somewhat; but, in general, it is impractical to build radar systems with line-of-sight ranges beyond a few hundred kilometres.

OTH radars use various techniques to see beyond that limit. Two techniques are most commonly used; shortwave systems that refract their signals off the ionosphere for very long-range detection, and surface wave systems, which use low-frequency radio waves that, due to diffraction, follow the curvature of the Earth to reach beyond the horizon. These systems achieve detection ranges of the order of a hundred kilometres from small, conventional radar installations. They can scan a series of high frequencies using a chirp transmitter.

=== Skywave systems ===
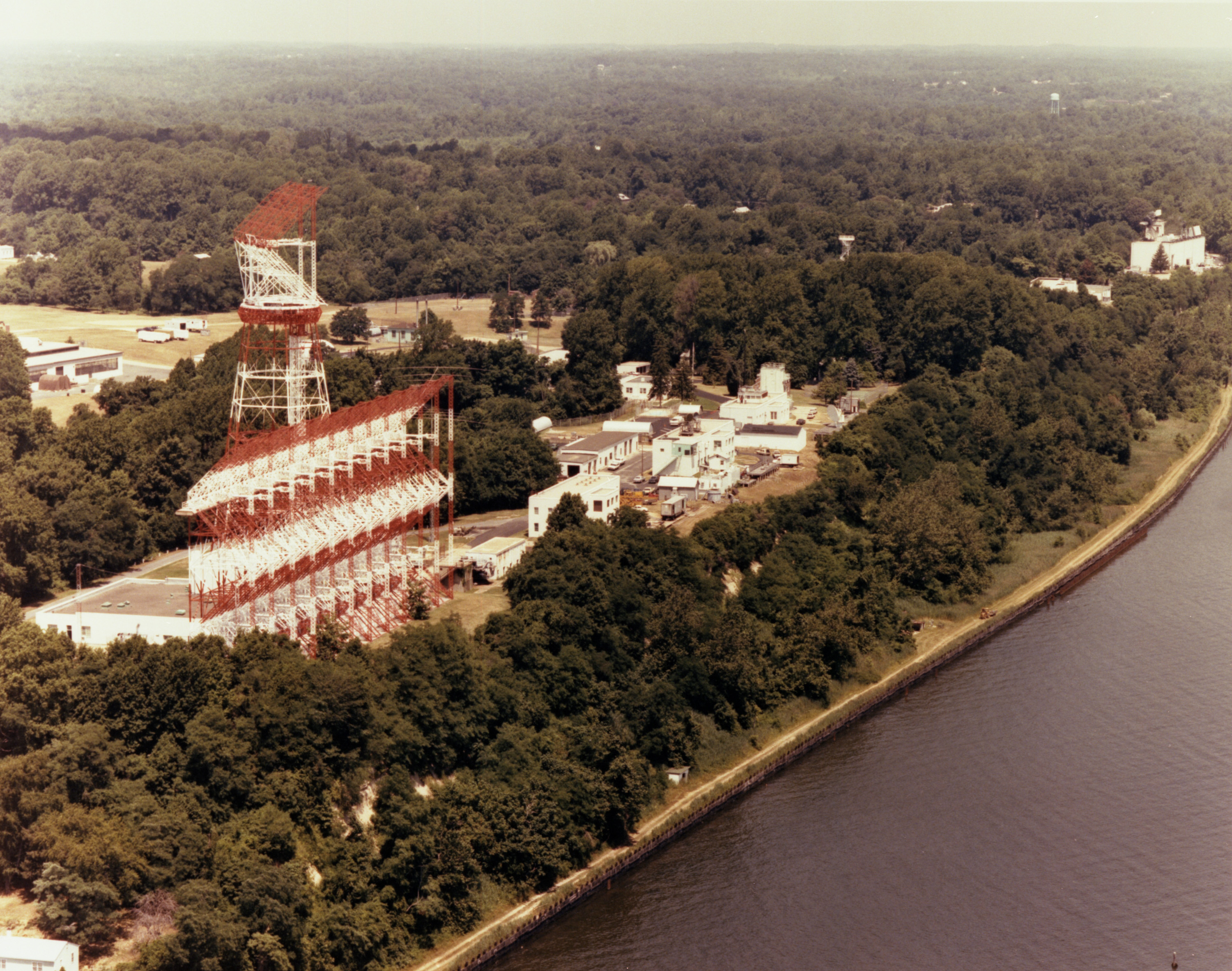
MADRE over-the-horizon radar at the NRL's Chesapeake Bay Detachment

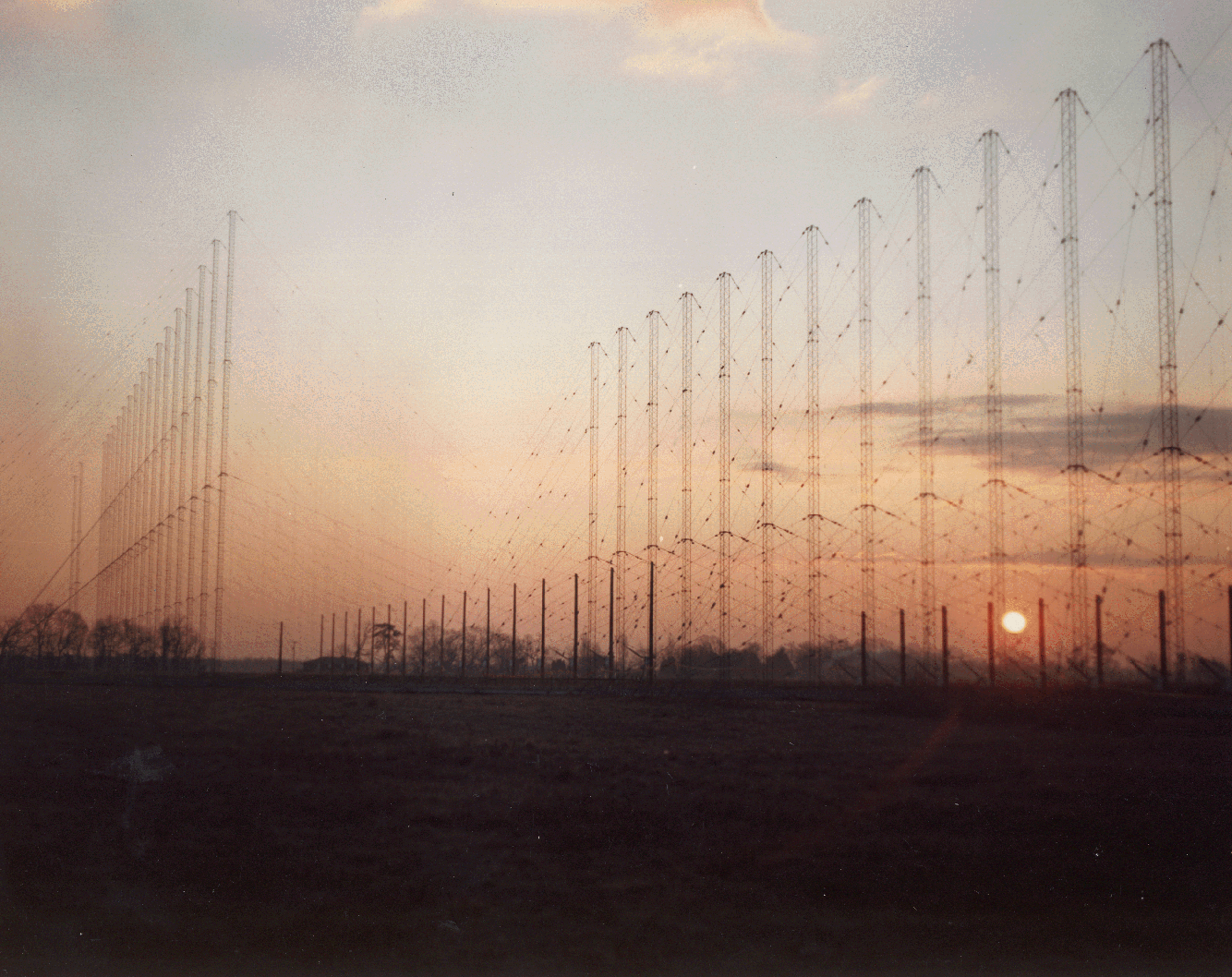
U.S. Navy Relocatable Over-the-Horizon Radar station

The most common type of OTH radar, OTH-B (backscatter), uses skywave or "skip" propagation, in which shortwave radio waves are refracted off an ionized layer in the atmosphere, the ionosphere, and return to Earth some distance away. A small amount of this signal will be scattered off desired targets back towards the sky, refracted off the ionosphere again, and return to the receiving antenna by the same path. Only one range of frequencies regularly exhibits this behaviour: the high frequency (HF) or shortwave part of the spectrum from 3–30 MHz. The best frequency to use depends on the conditions of the atmosphere and the sunspot cycle. For these reasons, systems using skywaves typically employ real-time monitoring of the reception of backscattered signals to continuously adjust the frequency of the transmitted signal.

The resolution of any radar depends on the width of the beam and the range to the target. For example; a radar with 1 degree beam width and a target at 120 km (75 mi) range will show the target as 2 km (1.2 mi) wide. To produce a 1-degree beam at the most common frequencies, an antenna 1.5 kilometres (0.93 miles) wide is required. Due to the physics of the refraction process, actual accuracy is even lower, with range resolution on the order of 20 to 40 kilometres (12–25 miles) and bearing accuracy of 2 to 4 kilometres (1.2–2.5 miles) being suggested. Even a 2 km accuracy is useful only for early warning, not for weapons fire.

Another problem is that the refraction process is highly dependent on the angle between the signal and the ionosphere, and is generally limited to about 2–4 degrees off the local horizon. Making a beam at this angle generally requires enormous antenna arrays and highly reflective ground along the path the signal is being sent, often enhanced by the installation of wire mesh mats extending as much as 3 kilometres (1.9 miles) in front of the antenna. OTH systems are thus very expensive to build, and essentially immobile.

Given the losses at each refraction, this "backscatter" signal is extremely small, which is one reason why OTH radars were not practical until the 1960s, when extremely low-noise amplifiers were first being designed. Since the signal refracted from the ground, or sea, will be very large compared to the signal refracted from a "target", some system needs to be used to distinguish the targets from the background noise. The easiest way to do this is to use the Doppler effect, which uses frequency shift created by moving objects to measure their velocity. By filtering out all the backscatter signal close to the original transmitted frequency, moving targets become visible. Even a small amount of movement can be seen using this process, speeds as low as 1.5 knots (2.8 km/h).

This basic concept is used in almost all modern radars, but in the case of OTH systems it becomes considerably more complex due to similar effects introduced by movement of the ionosphere. Most systems used a second transmitter broadcasting directly up at the ionosphere to measure its movement and adjust the returns of the main radar in real-time. Doing so required the use of computers, another reason OTH systems did not become truly practical until the 1960s, with the introduction of solid-state high-performance systems.

=== Ground wave systems ===
A second type of OTH radar, known as OTH-SW (surface wave), uses much lower frequencies, in the longwave bands. Radio waves at these frequencies can diffract around obstacles and follow the curving contour of the earth, traveling beyond the horizon. Echos reflected off the target return to the transmitter location by the same path. These ground waves have the longest range over the sea. Like the ionospheric high-frequency systems, the received signal from these ground wave systems is very low, and demands extremely sensitive electronics. Because these signals travel close to the surface, and lower frequencies produce lower resolutions, low-frequency systems are generally used for tracking ships, rather than aircraft. However, the use of bistatic techniques and computer processing can produce higher resolutions, and has been used beginning in the 1990s.

=== Limitations ===
Radar clutter can degrade the ability of OTH to detect targets. Such clutter can be caused by atmospheric phenomena such as disturbances in the ionosphere caused by geomagnetic storms or other space weather events. This phenomenon is especially apparent near the geomagnetic poles, where the action of the solar wind on the earth’s magnetosphere produces convection patterns in the ionospheric plasma.

== History ==
Engineers in the Soviet Union are known to have developed what appears to be the first operational OTH system in 1949, called "Veyer". However, little information on this system is available in Western sources, and no details of its operation are known. It is known that no further research was carried out by Soviet teams until the 1960s and 70s.

Much of the early research into effective OTH systems was carried out under the direction of Dr. William J. Thaler at the United States Naval Research Laboratory (NRL). The work was dubbed "Project Teepee" (for "Thaler's Project"). Their first experimental system, MUSIC (Multiple Storage, Integration, and Correlation), became operational in 1955 and was able to detect rocket launches 600 miles (970 km) away at Cape Canaveral, and nuclear explosions in Nevada at 1,700 miles (2,700 km). A greatly improved system, a testbed for an operational radar, was built in 1961 as MADRE (Magnetic-Drum Radar Equipment) at Chesapeake Bay. It detected aircraft as far as 3,000 kilometres (1,900 miles) using as little as 50 kW of broadcast energy. (Note: Laurie states two ranges for MADRE against aircraft, 3,000 and 4,000 kilometres (1,900 and 2,500 mi), on the same page. The former appears to be correct from a comparison with other sources. To add to the confusion, Signals describes MADRE as having an average power of 100 kW and a peak of 5 MW, much more powerful than suggested by Laurie. See Signals, Vol 31, Issue 1, p. 7.)

As the names imply, both of the NRL systems relied on the comparison of returned signals stored on magnetic drums. In an attempt to remove clutter from radar displays, many late-war and post-war radar systems added an acoustic delay line that stored the received signal for exactly the amount of time needed for the next signal pulse to arrive. By adding the newly arrived signal to an inverted version of the signals stored in the delay line, the output signal included just the changes from one pulse to the next. This removed any static reflections, like nearby hills or other objects, leaving only the moving objects, such as aircraft. This basic concept would work for a long-range radar as well but had the problem that a delay line has to be mechanically sized to the pulse-repetition frequency of the radar, or PRF. For long-range use, the PRF was very long to start, and deliberately changed to make different ranges come into view. For this role, the delay line was not usable, and the magnetic drum, recently introduced, provided a convenient and easily controlled variable-delay system.

Another early shortwave OTH system was built in Australia in the early 1960s. This consisted of several antennas positioned four wavelengths apart, allowing the system to use phase-shift beamforming to steer the direction of sensitivity and adjust it to cover Singapore, Calcutta, and the UK. This system consumed 25 miles (40 km) of electrical cable in the antenna array.

== Systems ==
=== Australia ===
Official coverage of the Australian Jindalee Operational Radar Network

A more recent addition is the Jindalee Operational Radar Network developed by the Australian Department of Defence in 1998 and completed in 2000. It is operated by No. 1 Radar Surveillance Unit of the Royal Australian Air Force. Jindalee is a multistatic radar (multiple-receiver) system using OTH-B, allowing it to have both long range as well as anti-stealth capabilities. It has an official range of 3,000 kilometres (1,900 mi), but in 1997 the prototype was able to detect missile launches by China over 5,500 kilometres (3,400 mi) distant.

Jindalee uses 560 kW compared to the United States' OTH-B's 1 MW, yet offers far better range than the U.S. 1980s system, due to the considerably improved electronics and signal processing.

=== Brazil ===
The OTH 0100 Radar is capable of monitoring vessels beyond 200 nautical miles (370 km; 230 mi) away from shore, exceeding the direct line of sight of conventional radars.

=== Canada ===
Canada has been investigating the use of high frequency surface wave radar (HFSWR) for surveillance of the 200 nautical mile exclusive economic zone (EEZ) for more than 30 years. Research was initiated in 1984 with the re-purposing of a decommissioned LORAN-A navigation beacon for undertaking experimentation in aircraft, vessel and iceberg tracking. Research continued for the next decade and in 1999, Canada installed two SWR-503 High-Frequency Surface-Wave Radar systems at Cape Race and Cape Bonavista, Newfoundland. The sites underwent a technology evaluation in 2000 and were subsequently upgraded and operationally evaluated in 2002. The following is a quote from the October 2002 Operational Evaluation (OPEVAL) performed by Canadian Department of National Defence: "HFSWR is a beneficial addition to the Recognized Maritime Picture (RMP). Of all the data sources evaluated, it was the only sensor offering near real-time information updates. It provided frequent reporting and generally demonstrated reliable tracking of surface targets in its area of coverage. When the HFSWR system was combined with other data sources, there was a synergistic effect that improved the overall quality of the RMP. Furthermore, from the analysis of the potential contribution to the surveillance-related Force Planning Scenarios, it was evident that the RMP would benefit from the addition of the HFSWR as a new data source."

International sales of the SWR503 radar followed with operational systems installed in Asia (2008) and Europe (2009). In 2007 operation of the Canadian systems was halted due to concerns over the potential for harmful interference with primary spectrum users. In 2010 the unique capability of HFSWR to provide low cost surveillance of the EEZ resulted in a re-evaluation of the technology and subsequent development of a 3rd generation, (3rd gen) HFSWR system based on the principle of sense-and-adapt technology that enabled operation on a non-allocated, non-interference basis through the use of dynamic spectrum management. Additional developments included improved range performance, better positional accuracy and reduction of false tracks and earlier track initiation. In June 2019, MAEROSPACE was granted a global license to design, manufacture, and internationally market the Canadian HFSWR system and its derivatives.

On 18 March 2025, Canadian prime minister Mark Carney announced that Canada would purchase JORN radar technology from Australia, for deployment over the Arctic.

=== China ===
A number of OTH-B and OTH-SW radars are reportedly in operation in China. However, transmission from these radars causes much interference to other international licensed users，

An OTH-B set was added in Inner Mongolia following the deployment of THAAD to South Korea.

=== France ===
France developed an OTH radar called NOSTRADAMUS during the 1990s (NOSTRADAMUS stands for New Transhorizon Decametric System Applying Studio Methods (French: nouveau système transhorizon décamétrique appliquant les méthodes utilisées en studio).) In March 1999, the OTH radar NOSTRADAMUS was said to have detected two Northrop B-2 Spirits flying to Kosovo. It entered service for the French army in 2005 and is still in development. It is based on a star-shaped antenna field, used for emission and reception (monostatic), and can detect aircraft at a range of more than 3,000 kilometres (1,900 mi), in a 360-degree arc. The frequency range used is from 6 to 30 MHz.

Launched officially in 2009, the French developed a new over-the-horizon radar (High Frequency Surface Wave Radar – HFSWR) capable of monitoring maritime traffic up to 200 nautical miles (370 km; 230 mi) offshore. A demonstration site is operational since January 2015 on the French Mediterranean coast to showcase the 24/7 capabilities of the system that is now offered for sale by DIGINEXT.

=== India ===
India has developed a variety of long and short range radars. Although it doesn't have an operational over the horizon radar at present, India's Swordfish Long Range Tracking Radar, a part of India's missile defence system has a maximum range of 800 kilometres (500 mi) currently being upgraded for 1,500 kilometres (930 mi).

DRDO's LRDE is working on a prototype OTH radar. The design work of system is already complete and a prototype OTH is expected to realised by late 2021. The prototype will have two different types of arrays and itself will determine best frequency to use to track objects. After successful trials of existing system, India is expected to develop a large OTH radar based on same design.

=== Iran ===
Iran is working on an OTH radar called Sepehr, with a reported range of 3,000 kilometres (1,900 mi). It is currently operational.

=== Soviet Union / Ukraine / Russia ===
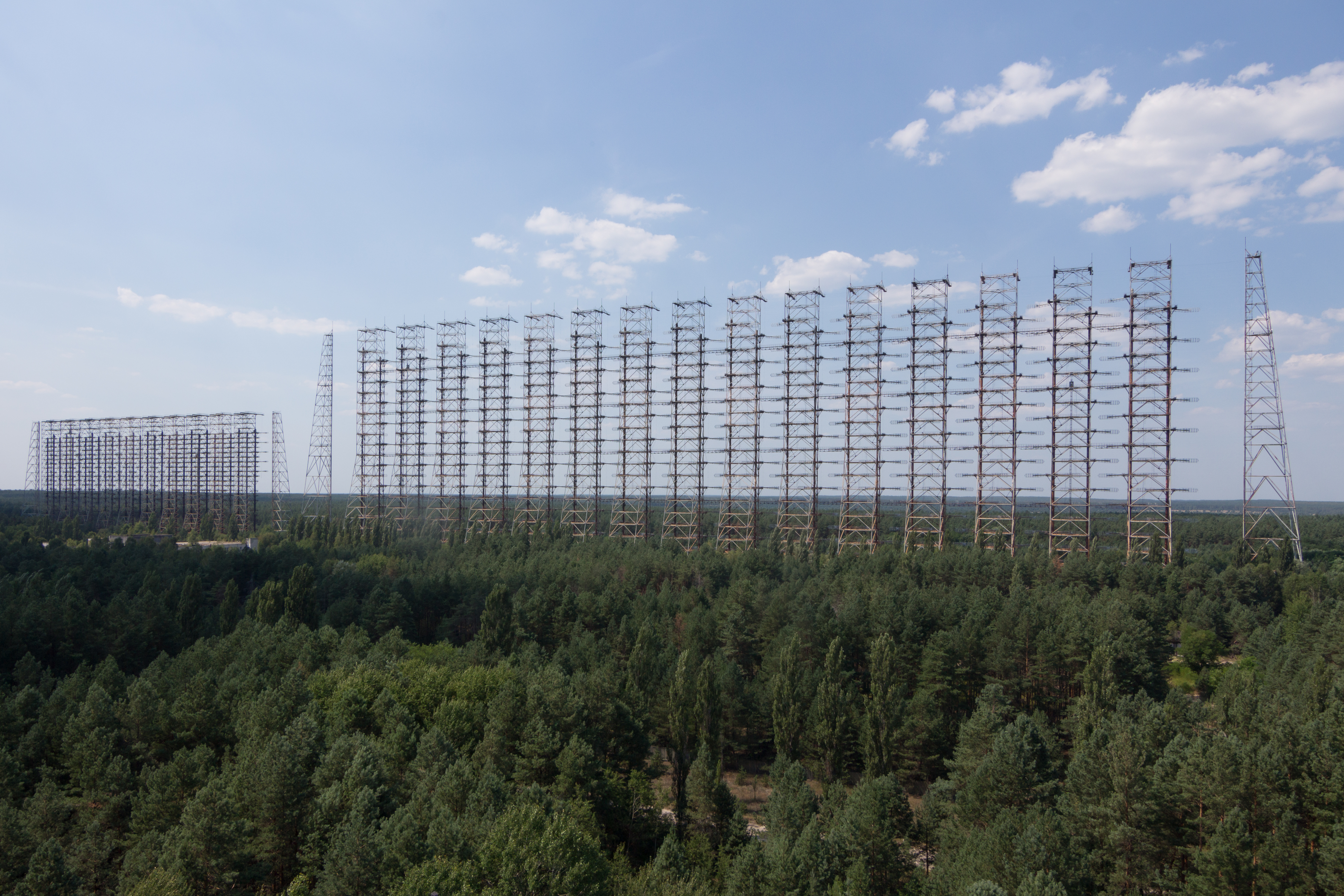
Duga radar array, near Chernobyl

Beginning as early as the 1950s, the Soviet Union had also studied OTH systems. The first experimental model appears to be the Veyer (Hand Fan), which was built in 1949. The next serious Soviet project was Duga, built outside Mykolaiv on the Black Sea coast near Odessa in Ukraine. Aimed eastward, Duga first ran on 7 November 1971, and was successfully used to track missile launches from the far east and Pacific Ocean to the testing ground on Novaya Zemlya.

This was followed by the first operational system Duga-1, known in the west as Steel Yard, which first broadcast in 1976. Built outside Gomel, near Chernobyl, it was aimed northward and covered the continental United States. Its loud and repetitive pulses in the middle of the shortwave radio bands led to its being known as the "Russian Woodpecker" by amateur radio (ham) operators. The Soviet Union eventually shifted the frequencies they used, without admitting they were even the source, largely due to its interference with certain long-range air-to-ground communications used by commercial airliners. A second system was set up near Komsomolsk-on-Amur in the Russian Far East, also covering the continental United States and Alaska.

In early 2014, Russia announced a new system, called Container, that was to see over 3000 km.

Another recent Russian OTH radar system is Podsolnukh (Sunflower), a coast-horizon shortwave station short-range radar. "Sunflower" is designed to detect surface and air targets at a distance of 450 kilometres (280 mi), and meant for use in coastal surface and air control systems within the 200-mile (320 km) economic zone. The system allows operators to automatically and simultaneously detect, track and classify up to 300 offshore and 100 air objects beyond the radio horizon, and provide their coordinates to the targeting systems and armaments of ships and air defense systems. The radar passed state tests in 2008. Three stations are on duty, in the Sea of Okhotsk, the Sea of Japan, and the Caspian Sea.

=== USA and UK ===
British PLUTO II OTH Radio broadcasting from Cyprus on frequency 15300 AM, recorded on 16 August 2022

==== UK/US Cobra Mist ====
The first truly operational development was an Anglo-American system known as Cobra Mist, which began construction in the late 1960s. Cobra Mist used an enormous 10 MW transmitter and could detect aircraft over the western Soviet Union from its location in Suffolk. When system testing started in 1972, however, an unexpected source of noise rendered it largely unusable. The source of the noise was never identified and the site was abandoned in 1973.

Other early UK/US systems from the same era include:

- an installation at RAF Akrotiri on Cyprus and Okinawa. Cobra Shoe was a reported Over The Horizon (Backscatter) (OTH-B) radar designed by RCA Corporation, designed to monitor ballistic missile tests in the interior of the Soviet Union, installed in the Western Sovereign Base Area (Akrotiri), Cyprus. Source is "U.S. declassified documents". Installed since around 1964; no details on when/whether it left service.
- the Sugar Tree radar system.

==== U.S. Air Force ====
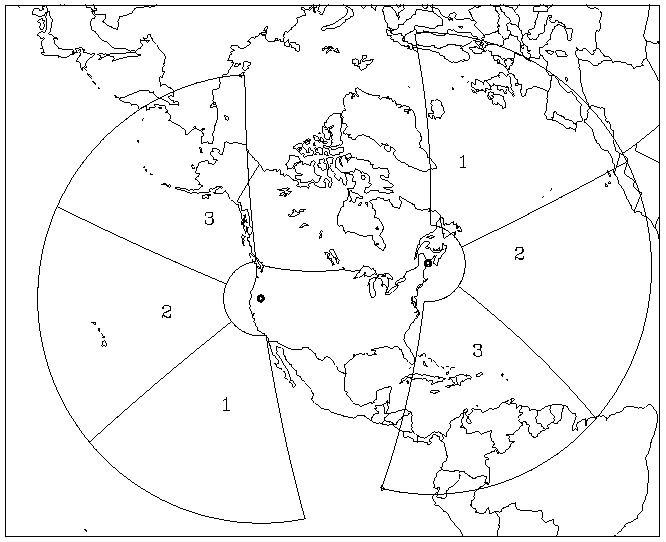
OTH-B coverage from stations in Maine and Oregon

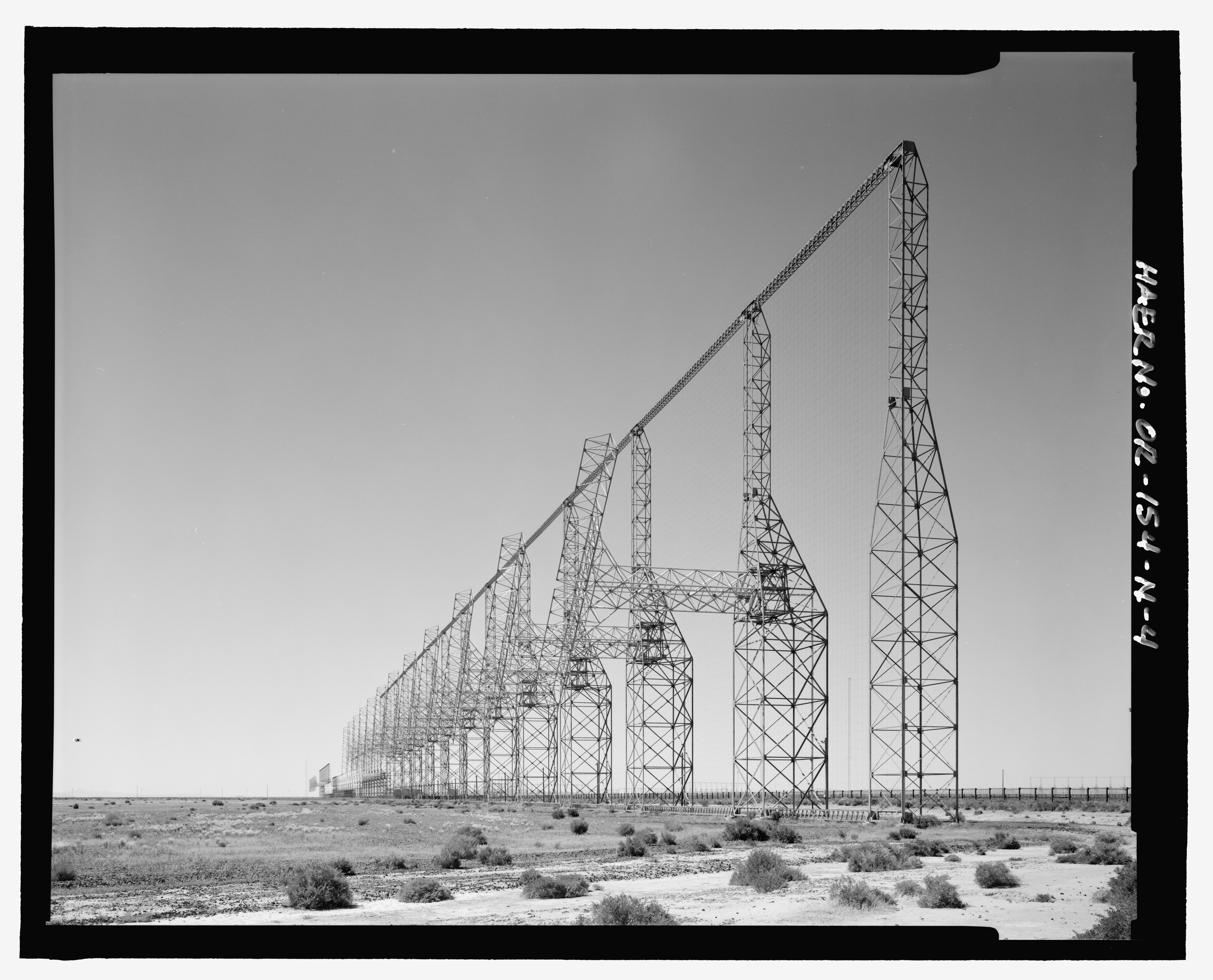
Transmitter array, Sector 6, Christmas Valley, Oregon

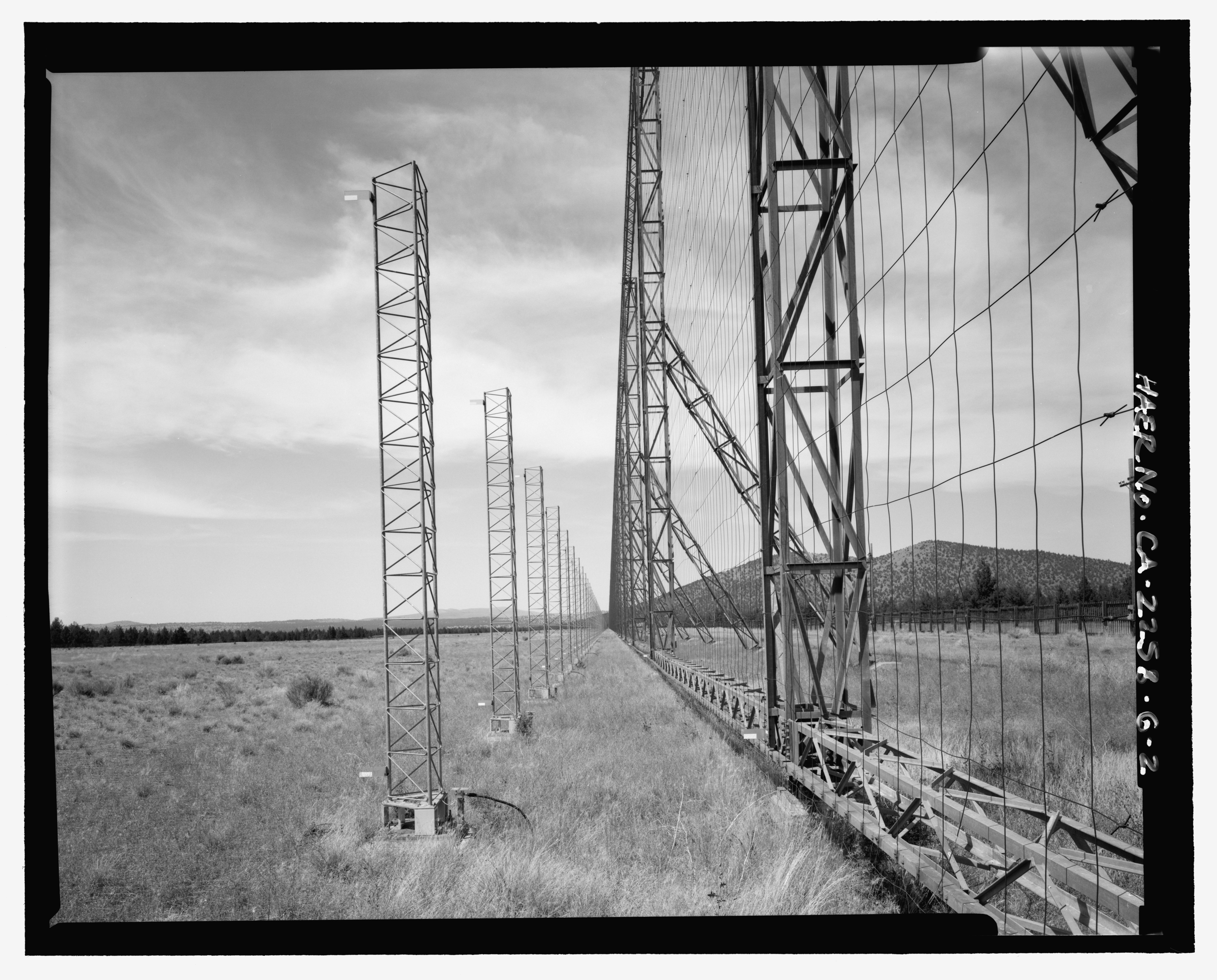
Receiver array, Sector 5, Tule Lake, California

Obsolete US Air Force OTH-B (AN/FPS-118) radar

The United States Air Force Rome Laboratory had the first complete success with their AN/FPS-118 OTH-B. A prototype with a 1 MW transmitter and a separate receiver was installed in Maine, offering coverage over a 60-degree arc between 900 and 3,300 kilometres (560 and 2,050 mi). A permanent transmitting facility was then built at Moscow AFS, a receiving facility at Columbia Falls Air Force Station, and an operational center between them in Bangor, Maine. The coverage could be extended with additional receivers, providing for complete coverage over a 180-degree arc (each 60 degree portion known as a "sector").

GE Aerospace was awarded the development contract, expanding the existing east coast system with two additional sectors, while building another three-sector system on the west coast, a two-sector system in Alaska, and a one-sector system facing south. In 1992, the Air Force contracted to extend the coverage 15 degrees clockwise on the southern of the three east coast sectors to be able to cover the southeast U.S. border. Additionally, the range was extended to 3,000 miles (4,800 km), crossing the equator. This was operated 40 hours a week at random times. Radar data were fed to the U.S. Customs/Coast Guard C3I Center, Miami; Joint Task Force 4 Operations Center, Key West; U.S. Southern Command Operations Center, Key West; and U.S. Southern Command Operations Center, Panama.

Central Over-the-Horizon Backscatter Radar System

While the four planned OTH-B systems would establish a surveillance zone around the east, west, and south perimeters of North America. The Central Radar System (CRS) was needed to complete the perimeter coverage of the southern approaches to North America. It was also needed to cover the near-shore ocean areas not covered by the East Coast and West Coast OTH-B systems.

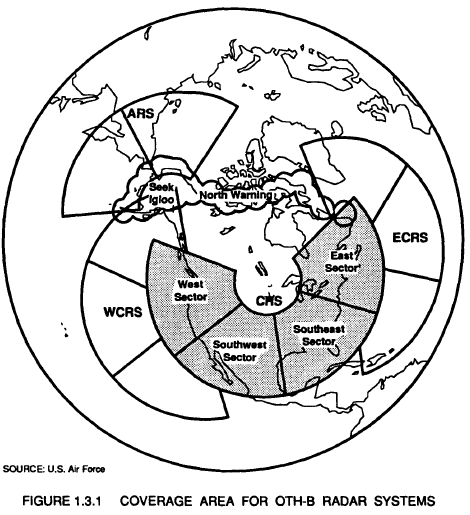
Coverage areas added to East and West Coast OTH-B coverage by a Central Radar System

The CRS would consist of four sectors, each covering a 60-degree arc, for a total coverage arc of 240 degrees over the western, southwestern, southeastern, and eastern approaches to North America, including the Gulf of Mexico, the land area of Mexico, and the Pacific Ocean west and south of Mexico. The CRS would also cover near-shore areas along both the eastern and western coasts of North America that are not covered by the ECRS and WCRS because the OTH-B system functions only at a distance greater than 500 nmi from the receive antennas. Thus, CRS would complete coverage of those areas, overlapping the surveillance areas of the ECRS and WCRS.

With the end of the Cold War, the influence of the two senators from Maine was not enough to save the operation and the Alaska and southern-facing sites were canceled, the two so-far completed western sectors and the eastern ones were turned off and placed in "warm storage," allowing them to be used again if needed. By 2002, the west coast facilities were downgraded to "cold storage" status, meaning that only minimal maintenance was performed by a caretaker.

Research was begun into the feasibility of removing the facilities. After a period of public input and environmental studies, in July 2005 the U.S. Air Force Air Combat Command published a "Final Environmental Assessment for Equipment Removal at Over-the-Horizon Backscatter Radar - West Coast Facilities". A final decision was made to remove all radar equipment at the west coast sector's transmitter site at Christmas Valley Air Force Station outside Christmas Valley, Oregon and its receiver site near Tulelake, California. This work was completed by July 2007 with the demolition and removal of the antenna arrays, leaving the buildings, fences and utility infrastructure at each site intact.

In 2018, development started on the high-frequency Tactical Multi-Mission Over the Horizon Radar (TACMOR), a technology prototype to expand air and maritime awareness over the Western Pacific. In 2022 construction of a TACMOR radar station in Palau was agreed, expected to be operational in 2026.

==== U.S. Navy ====
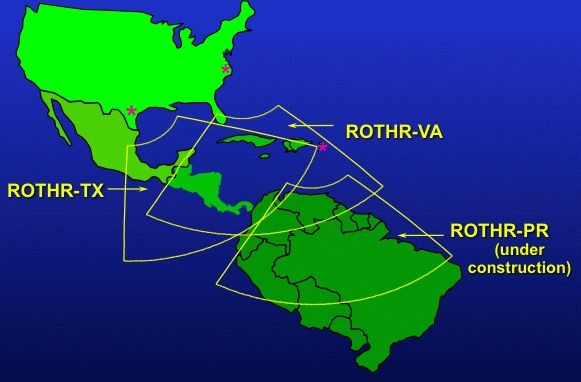
Coverage of the three U.S. Navy ROTHR stations in Texas, Virginia, and Puerto Rico

The United States Navy created their own system, the AN/TPS-71 ROTHR (Relocatable Over-the-Horizon Radar), which covers a 64-degree wedge-shaped area at ranges from 500 to 1,600 nautical miles (925 to 3,000 km). ROTHR was originally intended to monitor ship and aircraft movement over the Pacific, and thus allow coordinated fleet movements well in advance of an engagement. In 1991, a prototype ROTHR system was installed on the isolated Aleutian Island of Amchitka, Alaska, monitoring the eastern coast of Russia. It remained in use until 1993, and the equipment was later removed into storage. The first production systems were installed in the test site in Virginia for acceptance testing, but were then transitioned to counter the illegal drug trade, covering Central America and the Caribbean. The second production ROTHR was later set up in Texas, covering many of the same areas in the Caribbean, but also providing coverage over the Pacific as far south as Colombia. It also operates in the anti-drug trafficking role. The third, and final, production system was installed in Puerto Rico, extending anti-drug surveillance past the equator, deep into South America.

== Alternative approaches to over the horizon radar ==
Another common application of over-horizon radar uses surface waves, also known as groundwaves. Groundwaves provide the method of propagation for medium-wave AM broadcasting below 1.6 MHz and other transmissions at lower frequencies. Groundwave propagation gives a rapidly decaying signal at increasing distances over ground and many such broadcast stations have limited range. However, seawater, with its high conductivity, supports groundwaves to distances of 100 kilometres (62 mi) or more. This type of radar, surface-wave OTH, is used for surveillance, and operates most commonly between 4 and 20 MHz. Lower frequencies enjoy better propagation but poorer radar reflection from small targets, so there is usually an optimum frequency that depends on the type of target.

A different approach to over-the-horizon radar is to use creeping waves or electromagnetic surface waves at much lower frequencies. Creeping waves are the scattering into the rear of an object due to diffraction, which is the reason both ears can hear a sound on one side of the head, for instance, and was how early communication and broadcast radio was accomplished. In the radar role, the creeping waves in question are diffracting around the Earth, although processing the returned signal is difficult. Development of such systems became practical in the late 1980s due to the rapidly increasing processing power available. Such systems are known as OTH-SW, for surface wave.

The first OTH-SW system deployed appears to be a Soviet system positioned to watch traffic in the Sea of Japan. A newer system has recently been used for coastal surveillance in Canada, and is now offered for sale by Maerospace, Australia has also deployed a high frequency surface wave radar.
