= Duga radar =

Soviet over-the-horizon early-warning radar system

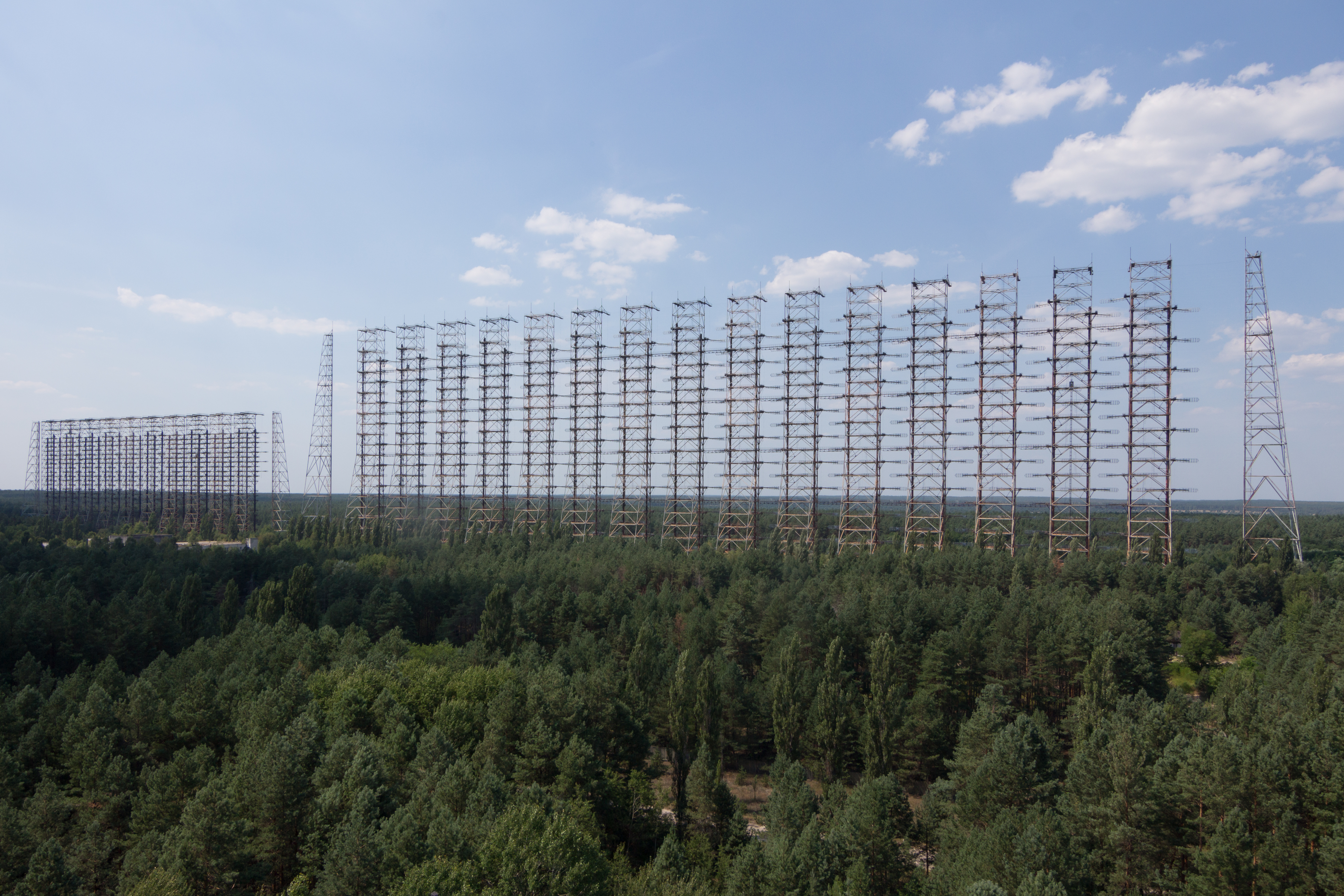
- The array at Chernobyl, Ukraine, viewed from a distance in 2014

Immovable Monument of National Significance of Ukraine
- Official name: Заобрійна (загоризонтна) радіолокаційна станція "Дуга" (Over-the-horizon radar station "Duga")
- Type: Science and Technology
- Reference no.: 100030-Н

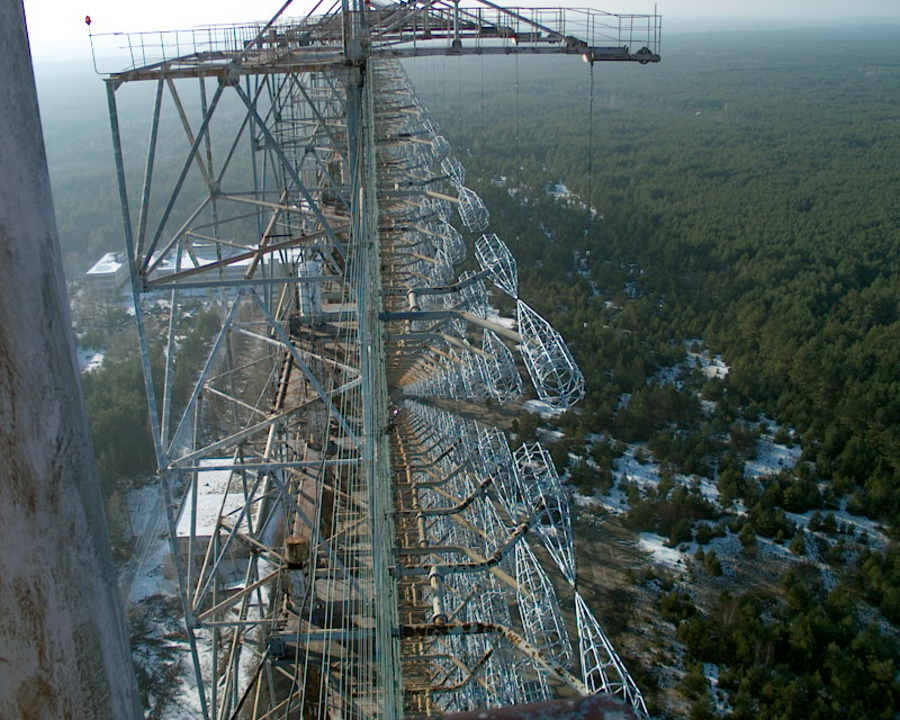
Duga-1 array within the Chernobyl Exclusion Zone. The array of pairs of cylindrical/conical cages on the right are the active elements, fed at the facing points with a form of ladder line suspended from stand-off platforms at top right. A backplane axial reflector of small wires is visible left of centre, most clearly at the bottom of the image. The elements appear to be a modified type of cage or bi-conical dipole providing wide operating bandwidth.

Duga (Russian: Дуга, lit. 'arc' or 'curve') was an over-the-horizon radar (OTH) system used in the Soviet Union as part of its early-warning radar network for missile defence. It operated from July 1976 to December 1989. Two operational Duga radars were deployed, with one near Chernobyl and Liubech in the Ukrainian SSR, and the other in eastern Siberia.

The Duga system was extremely powerful, reaching over 10 MW, and emitted in the shortwave radio bands. It was given the nickname Russian Woodpecker by shortwave listeners for its emissions randomly appearing and sounding like sharp, repetitive tapping noises at a frequency of 10 Hz. The random frequency hops often disrupted legitimate broadcasts, amateur radio operations, oceanic, commercial, aviation communications, and utility transmissions, resulting in thousands of complaints from many countries worldwide. The signal became such a nuisance that some communications receivers began including Woodpecker Blankers in their circuit designs.

The unclaimed signal used to be a source of speculation, giving rise to theories such as Soviet brainwashing and weather modification experiments. However, because of its distinctive transmission pattern, many experts and amateur radio hobbyists realized it was an over-the-horizon radar system. NATO military intelligence had already given it the reporting name STEEL WORK or STEEL YARD, based on the massive size of the antenna, which spanned 700 metres (2,300 ft; 0.43 mi) in length and 150 metres (490 ft) in height.

== History ==
=== Genesis ===
The Soviets had been working on early-warning radar for their anti-ballistic missile systems through the 1960s, but most of these had been line-of-sight systems that were useful for rapid analysis and interception only. None of these systems had the capability to provide early warning of a launch, within seconds or minutes of a launch, which would give the defences time to study the attack and plan a response. At the time, the Soviet early warning satellite network was not well developed. An over-the-horizon radar sited in the USSR would help solve this problem, and work on such a system for this associated role started in the late 1960s.

The first experimental system, Duga, was built outside Mykolaiv in Ukraine, successfully detecting rocket launches from Baikonur Cosmodrome at 2,500 kilometres (1,600 mi). This was followed by the prototype Duga, built on the same site, which was able to track launches from the far east and submarines in the Pacific Ocean as the missiles flew towards Novaya Zemlya. Both of these radar systems were aimed east and were fairly low power, but with the concept proven, work began on an operational system. The new Duga-1 systems, built in 1972, used a transmitter and receiver separated by about 60 kilometres (37 mi).

Woodpecker
Woodpecker on shortwave radio interfering with WWVH, 2 November 1984. Near the midpoint, a voice can be heard giving the time 1:27 UTC.

Locations of Duga and Duga-1 systems in Ukraine

=== "Russian Woodpecker" ===
At some point in 1976, a new and powerful radio signal was detected simultaneously worldwide, and quickly dubbed 'the Woodpecker' by amateur radio operators. Transmission power on some Woodpecker transmitters was estimated to be as high as 10 MW equivalent isotropically radiated power. Even prior to 1976, a similar woodpecker-style interference is remembered by radio amateurs occurring in the high-frequency band. As early as 1963, or before, radio amateurs were calling this "the Russian Woodpecker". Little is known about the power levels or Russian designation but it was probably a forerunner of the Duga radar systems. It was also speculated at that time, at least among radio amateurs, that this was an over-the-horizon radar.

Triangulation by amateur radio hobbyists and NATO showed the signals came from a location in present-day Ukraine, at the time called the Ukrainian Soviet Socialist Republic (part of the USSR). Confusion due to small differences in the reports being made from various sources led to the site being variously located near Kyiv, Minsk, Chernobyl, Gomel or Chernihiv. All of these reports were describing the same deployment, with the transmitter only a few kilometres southwest of Chernobyl (south of Minsk, northwest of Kyiv) and the receiver about 50 kilometres (31 mi) northeast of Chernobyl (just west of Chernihiv, south of Gomel). At one time there was speculation that several transmitters were in use.

The radar system was given the code 5Н32-West by the Soviets, and was set up in two closed towns. Liubech-1 held the two transmitters and Chernobyl-2 the receivers.

=== NATO reporting name ===
The NATO reporting name for the Duga-1 is often quoted as STEEL YARD. Many online and several print references use this name. However, some sources also use the term STEEL WORK (or STEEL WORKS). As any "official" sources using NATO reporting names are likely to be classified, establishing the true name is difficult. The earliest found open source mention of a NATO reporting name for this system, a reference publication in print while the system was still active, unambiguously uses the term STEEL WORK. Jane's Information Group is an often quoted open source reference for information across several military fields and subjects. Several editions of "Jane's Radar and Electronic Warfare Systems" over a number of years use the term "Steel Works".

=== Civilian identification ===
Even from the earliest reports it was suspected that the signals were tests of an over-the-horizon radar, and this remained the most popular hypothesis during the Cold War. Several other theories were floated as well, including everything from jamming western broadcasts to submarine communications. The broadcast jamming theory was discarded early on when a monitoring survey showed that Radio Moscow and other pro-Soviet stations were just as badly affected by woodpecker interference as Western stations.

As more information about the signal became available, its purpose as a radar signal became increasingly obvious. In particular, its signal contained a clearly recognizable structure in each BPSK modulated pulse, which was eventually identified as a 31-bit pseudo-random binary sequence with properties much like Barker codes, with a bit-width of 100 μs resulting in a 3.1 ms pulse. The auto-correlation of this pulse/sequence results in a single 100 μs pulse 31 times the amplitude of the received sequence, giving a resolution of 15 kilometres (9.3 mi) (the distance light travels in 50 μs) and process gain of almost 30 dB. This system took advantage of pulse compression to increase the power of the received echoes thereby increasing the sensitivity and effective range. When a second Woodpecker appeared, located in eastern Russia, but also pointed toward the US and covering blank spots in the first system's pattern, this conclusion became inescapable. These further installations allowed for more precise pin-pointing of potential targets or missiles in multiple dimensions thanks in part to the properties of the Barker codes that allow for multiple radars operating on the same frequencies without significant interference.

In 1988, the US Federal Communications Commission (FCC) conducted a study on the Woodpecker signal. Data analysis showed a pulse repetition interval (PRI) of about 90 ms, a frequency range of 7 to 19 MHz, a bandwidth of 0.02 to 0.8 MHz, and typical transmission time of seven minutes.

The pulses transmitted by the Woodpecker had a wide bandwidth, typically 40 kHz. Their repetition frequencies were 10, 16 and 20 Hz with the most common frequency of 10 Hz, while the 16 and 20 Hz modes were rarely used.

=== Jamming attempts and disappearance ===
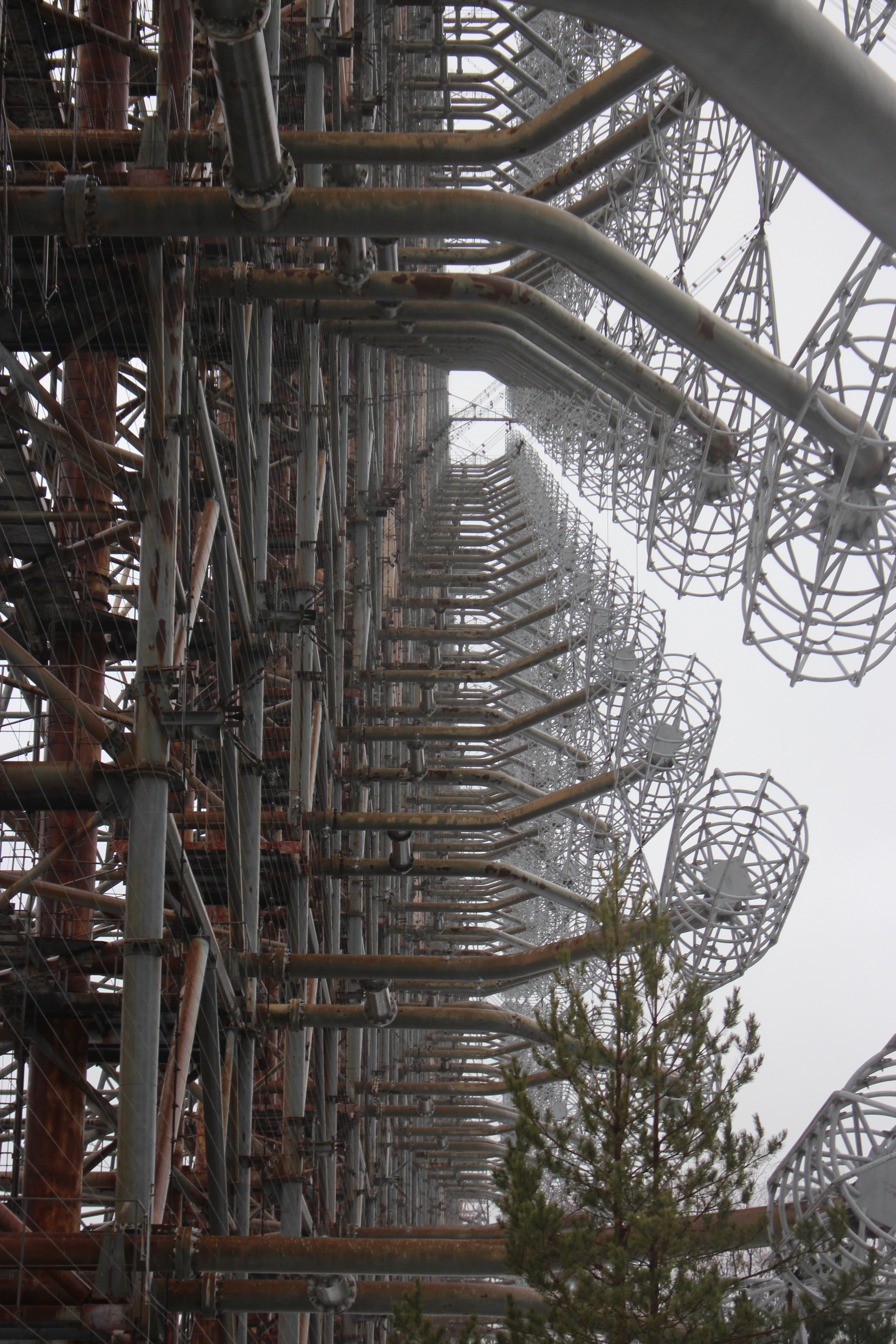
Steel structure of Duga-1 from below

To combat this interference, amateur radio operators attempted to jam the signal by transmitting synchronized unmodulated continuous wave signals at the same pulse rate as the offending signal. They formed a club called The Russian Woodpecker Hunting Club.

The Woodpecker signals eventually stopped in 1989. It is suspected that the end of the Cold War led to the shutdown of the Duga systems.

== Locations ==
Location of Duga-2 in Khabarovsk Krai

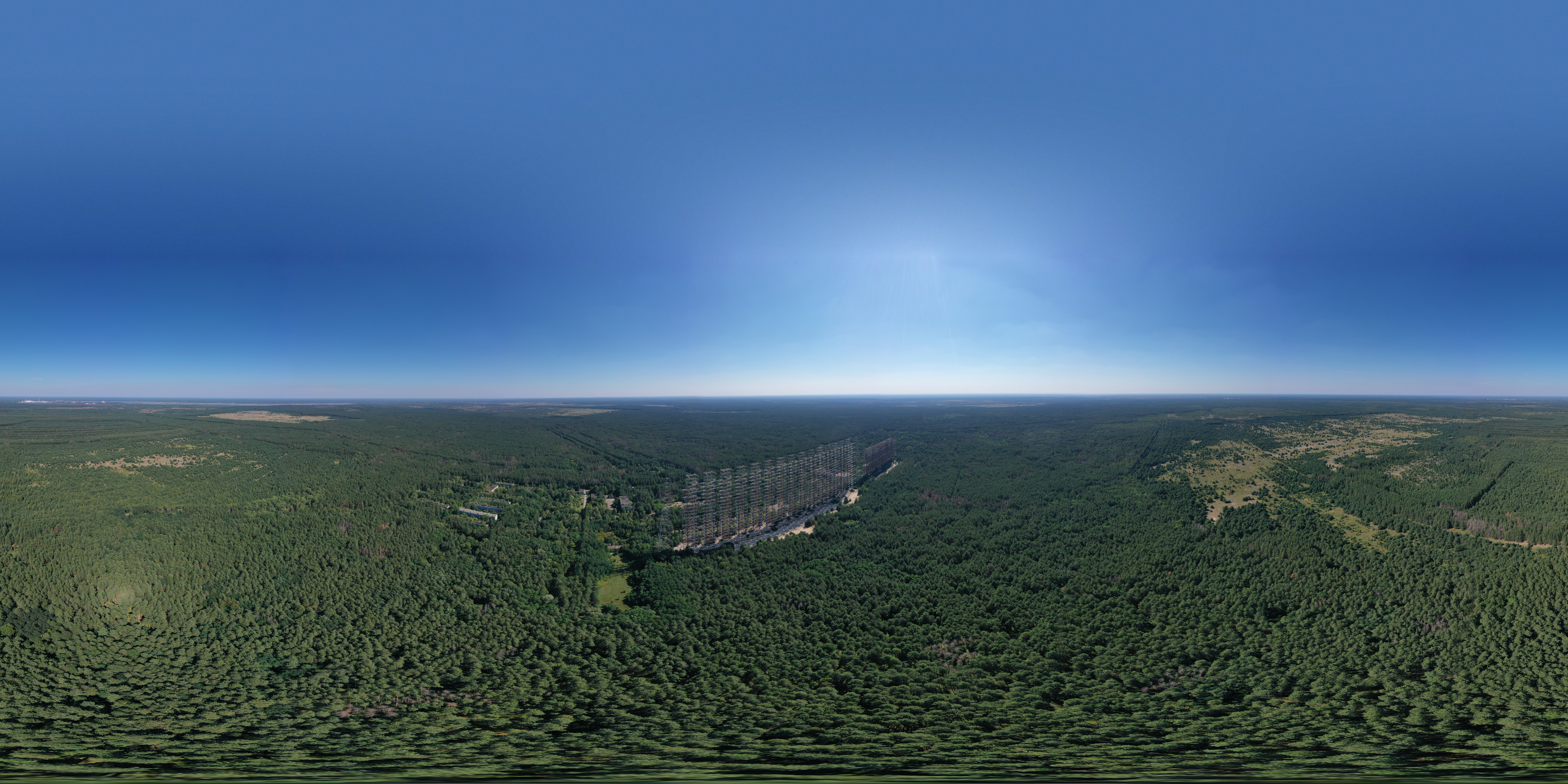
Panoramic view of the landscape surrounding Duga-1. The Chernobyl Nuclear Power Plant is visible in the far left, close to the horizon. (view as a 360° interactive panorama)

The original Duga was the first experimental system. It was built outside the Black Sea port of Mykolaiv in southern Ukraine, and successfully detected rocket launches from Baikonur Cosmodrome about 2,500 kilometres (1,600 mi) away. Duga is able to track launches from the Far East and from submarines in the Pacific Ocean, as the missiles fly towards Novaya Zemlya in the Arctic Ocean. This huge radar complex was restored in 2002 after a fire seriously damaged it. The transmitter was located at 46°48′26″N 32°13′12″E and the receiver at 47°02′28.33″N 32°11′57.29″E.

The original Duga was supplanted by a pair of installations: western, Duga-1, and eastern, Duga-2. Duga-1 was built in northern Ukraine, between Liubech and Chernobyl-2. The receiver is located at 51°18′19.06″N 30°03′57.35″E, 12 kilometres west-north-west of Chernobyl; the transmitter is located at 51°38′15.98″N 30°42′10.41″E about 50 kilometres (31 mi) northeast of Chernobyl. Duga-2 is located near Komsomolsk-on-Amur in Khabarovsk Krai, with the receiver at 50°23′07.98″N 137°19′41.87″E, some 30 kilometres (19 mi) southeast of the city, and the transmitter at 50°53′34.66″N 136°50′12.38″E, 45 kilometres (28 mi) north of the city.

== Notable media appearances ==
=== Video games ===
- The Duga radar is featured in the drone racing simulator Liftoff, as "The Russian Woodpecker".
- The Duga radar is heavily featured in the virtual reality game Proze: Enlightenment, a suspense/puzzle game with the theory that the radar is being used by mind controlling experiments during the 1950-60s. The game actually starts with the player ascending one of the pylons on a maintenance lift.
- A Duga radar is featured in the 2021 video game Chernobylite.
- A Duga array is a playable location in the Ukrainian developed S.T.A.L.K.E.R. 2: Heart of Chornobyl.

=== In print ===
- Markiyan Kamysh's book Stalking the Atomic City: Life Among the Decadent and the Depraved of Chornobyl depicts illegal trips to the Chernobyl Exclusion Zone, including to the Duga, and was praised by reviewers. La Repubblica listed it among their "books of the year" for 2019, in the "Constellations of the ten books that best reflect the spirit of the times". The Guardian called it a "remarkable book".

=== In film and television ===
- The Duga at Chernobyl was the focus of the 2015 documentary film, The Russian Woodpecker, by Chad Gracia. The film includes interviews with the commander of the duga, Vladimir Musiets, as well as the Vice-Commander, the Head of the Data Center, and others involved in building and operating the radar. The film also promotes a conspiracy theory that the Chernobyl disaster was engineered to cover up failures in the radar's design.
- The Chernobyl Duga site is featured in the Science Channel series "Mysteries of the Abandoned" (season 1, episode 1).

== See also ==
- Cobra Mist – Anglo-American experimental over-the-horizon radar station
- Container radar – a new Russian OTH radar with similar radio interference to the Duga
- High-frequency Active Auroral Research Program (HAARP) – Project to analyze the ionosphere
- Jindalee Operational Radar Network – a similar Australian system
- Numbers station – Shortwave radio stations broadcasting only numbers
- UVB-76 – a Russian radio transmitter, nicknamed "The Buzzer"
