= T-26 variants =

Vehicles based on the Soviet T-26 light tank

More than 50 different modifications and experimental vehicles based on the T-26 light infantry tank chassis were developed in the USSR in the 1930s, with 23 modifications going into series production. The majority were armoured combat vehicles: flame tanks, artillery tractors, radio-controlled tanks (teletanks), military engineering vehicles, self-propelled guns and armoured personnel carriers. They were developed at the Leningrad Factory of Experimental Mechanical Engineering (from 1935 known as the Factory No. 185 named after S.M. Kirov) by talented Soviet engineers P.N. Syachentov, S.A. Ginzburg, L.S. Troyanov, N.V. Tseits, B.A. Andryhevich, M.P. Zigel and others. Many Soviet tank engineers were declared "enemies of the nation" and repressed during Stalin's Great Purge from the middle of the 1930s. As a result, work on self-propelled guns and armoured carriers ceased in the USSR during that time. T-26 light tanks were also modified into armoured combat vehicles in the field during wartime.

== Flame-throwing (chemical) tanks ==
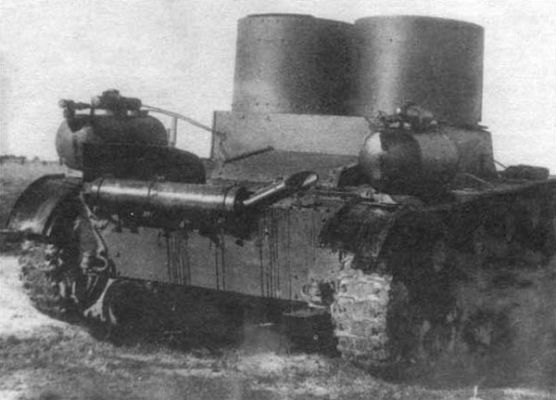
T-26 mod. 1931 with TKhP-3 tank chemical equipment.

Flame-throwing tanks formed around 12 per cent of the series production of T-26 light tanks. It should be mentioned that the abbreviation "OT" (Ognemetniy Tank which stands for Flame-throwing Tank) appeared only in post-war literature; these tanks were originally called "KhT" (Khimicheskiy Tank which stands for Chemical Tank), or BKhM (Boevaya Khimicheskaya Mashina; Fighting Chemical Vehicle) in the documents of the 1930s. All chemical (flame-throwing) tanks based on the T-26 chassis (KhT-26, KhT-130, KhT-133) were designated BKhM-3. The vehicles were intended for area chemical contamination, smoke screens and for flame-throwing. The TKhP-3 chemical equipment for smoke screens and chemical contamination was developed in 1932. This equipment could be easily installed on any T-26 light tank and was produced by the "Compressor" Factory, (introduced for smoke screening as the TDP-3 from summer 1934; 1,503 such sets were produced to the end of 1936).

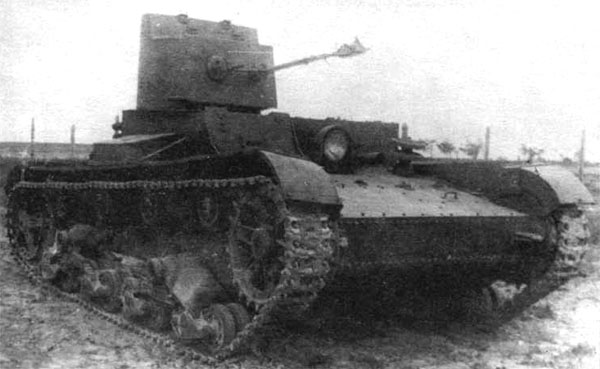
KhT-26 flame-throwing tank. This vehicle was produced in 1935 and partially modernized between 1938 and 1940, when new road wheels with removable bands and an armoured headlight were installed. Kubinka proving ground, 1940.

- KhT-26 (OT-26) — Flamethrower variant developed in 1933. Based on the twin-turreted T-26 mod. 1931 tank but using a single turret armed with a flamethrower, the second turret was removed.
- KhT-130 (OT-130) — Flamethrower variant of model 1933, using a larger 45 mm gun turret (main gun was replaced with a flamethrower).

KhT-130 (OT-130)

- KhT-133 (OT-133) — Flamethrower variant of model 1939 (main gun was replaced with a flamethrower).

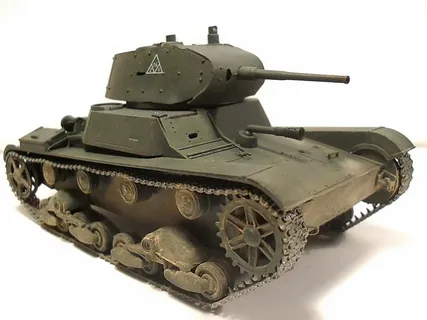
KhT-134 (OT-134)

- KhT-134 (OT-134) — Flamethrower variant of model 1939, with 45 mm gun intact and hull-mounted flamethrower. Prototype only.

== Combat engineer vehicles ==
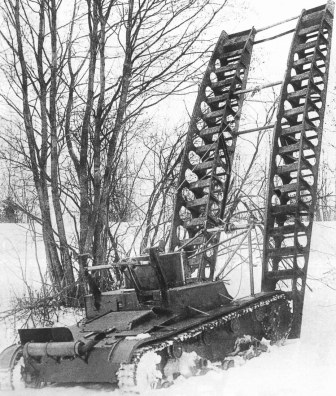
ST-26 engineer tank with a cable system of bridge laying during tests. March 1933.

- ST-26 (ST stands for saperniy tank or "engineer tank") — engineer tank; a bridge-laying tank based on the twin-turreted T-26 mod. 1931 chassis. According to the "System of armoured engineering armament of the Red Army", the ST-26 was developed by designers from the Academy of Military Engineering (chief engineer of the project - Gutman) in the beginning of 1932. The ST-26 had only one shortened turret in the middle of the hull armed with a DT tank machine gun with 1,008 rounds; arc of fire was 211°. Special equipment consisted of a metal tracked bridge 7.35 m (24.1 ft) long and weighing 1,100 kg (2,400 lb), supports for the bridge (a front frame with two forks and two guiding rollers, lower forks with a hoisting mechanism and a roller, a rear frame with mounts and two rollers) and a cable winch (driven by the tank engine with the use of the reversing gear) inside the vehicle. The ST-26 was intended to provide for crossing of trenches and streams 6–6.5 m (20–21 ft) wide and barriers up to 2 m (6.6 ft) high by T-27, T-26 and BT light tanks: the bridge had a maximum load rating of 14 tonnes (15 short tons). The bridge could be laid with the help of the cable winch in 25–40 seconds without crew exit; the raising operation took 2-3 min and a commander needed to come out from the vehicle in order to control the process. The ST-26 with its cable system for bridge laying was tested in the summer of 1932.

Additional variants of the ST-26 (with a sliding system of bridge laying and with a tipping system of bridge laying) were also tested from 1932. The first had a massive guide frame and a special boom (the bridge could be laid in 3 min 20 sec, the raise operation took 6-7 min), while the second was equipped with a special swinging-boom with a rack-and-pinion drive. All three variants of the ST-26 participated in military maneuvers of the Leningrad Military District in the summer of 1933; subsequently series production of the ST-26 with a cable system of bridge laying was begun as it proved to be more reliable and less complicated to maintain. The Defence Committee of the USSR ordered the production of 100 ST-26 to the end of 1933, but only 44 vehicles were assembled by the Factory No. 174 by 1934, and 20 in 1935. The delay was attributed to the manufacture of the metal bridges, carried out by the Gipstalmost Factory and several workshops using semi-handicraft techniques.

Specifications: weight - 9.5–10 tonnes (10.5–11.0 short tons); crew - 2 men (commander and driver); speed - 28 km/h (17 mph); range - 120 km (75 mi).

The Armoured Engineering Section of the Red Army's Research Institute of Engineer Equipment (NIIIT RKKA) in co-operation with the Gipstalmost Factory developed an improved engineer tank at the end of 1936, with a lever hydraulic system of bridge laying (similar to the UST-26, see below) and a small turret of new design. The bridge could be laid in 45 sec and the raise operation took 1.5 min (both processes did not require crew exit). The vehicle was assembled by the Podolsk Machine Factory named after S. Ordzhonikidze in July 1937, and was successfully tested at the NIIIT Proving Ground (85 bridge layings were performed and 70 light tanks passed over the bridge). This ST-26 prototype was also tested at the Kubinka Tank Proving Ground, and participated in military exercises of the Leningrad Military District in 1938. A decision was made in 1939 to produce a batch of engineer tanks with the lever hydraulic system, but the Podolsk Machine Factory could assemble only one. The Stalingrad Tractor Factory probably also produced two such vehicles the same year.

An experimental multispan bridge was developed in 1934 which allowed for the coupling together of three or more ST-26 bridges, using special automatic grips in the end of each bridge section. The multispan bridge employed 250 kg metal columns 2.5 m (8.2 ft) high and was intended for crossings by T-26 and BT light tanks of water obstacles up to 20–50 m (66–164 ft) wide and 3 m (9.8 ft) deep. The launching of each bridge section took 20-30 min. The bridge had no development after testing.

Engineer Alexandrov from the Research and Technology Division of the Red Army's Engineer Directorate (NTO UNI RKKA) developed a wooden tracked bridge 6.5 m (21 ft) long. The bridge was mounted on standard T-26 light tanks as well as on ST-26 engineer tanks and could be laid in 30-60 sec without crew exit. Trials carried out in July–August 1934 were successful and 20 such bridges were issued to the armed forces.

Seventy-one ST-26 engineer tanks were produced in 1932–1939, including experimental vehicles: 65 ST-26 with a cable-laid bridge system, 1 ST-26 with a sliding bridge, 1 ST-26 with a tipping bridge, 2 UST-26 and 2 ST-26 with a levered bridge-laying system.

Ten ST-26 engineer tanks were used on the Karelian Isthmus during the Winter War (9 with a cable system and 1 with a lever system); they were included in engineer groups for obstacle clearing that were established in each tank brigade during the war. Three ST-26 tanks of the 35th Light Tank Brigade had the most success (in particular they launched two bridges over a trench and then an antitank ditch for a tank battalion during an assault on the fortified High Point 65.5 (Hottinen area) of the Mannerheim Line on February 18, 1940). The ST-26 with the lever system of bridge laying demonstrated good results and that vehicle was used quite actively during the Winter War, while tanks with the cable system were less reliable and had limited use. There were no losses of ST-26 engineer tanks during the Winter War.

Tank units of the Red Army had 57 ST-26 engineer tanks on June 1, 1941: 9 in the Far Eastern Front, 26 in the Moscow Military District, 2 in the Leningrad Military District, 2 in the Kiev Special Military District, 8 in the Western Special Military District, 1 in the Volga Military District, and 9 vehicles were in military supply depots. From those ST-26 engineer tanks only 12 were in good order, the others required repair.

- UST-26 (UST stands for usovershenstvovanniy saperniy tank or "improved engineer tank") - mod. 1936 was an improved version of the ST-26. Operation of the ST-26 engineer tanks had demonstrated their low reliability (frequent breaking of wire cables and bending of bridge supporting mounts), so the improved UST-26 was developed in 1936. The vehicle designers were the Red Army's Research Institute of Engineer Equipment (NIIIT RKKA) and the Gipstalmost Factory (engineers Vayson, Nemets and Markov). The UST-26 used a lever system of bridge laying with two levers and a hydraulic cylinder. The Factory No. 174 in co-operation with the Podolsk Machine Factory assembled two UST-26 in 1936. Trials performed in March 1936 showed the UST-26 was an improvement on the series-produced ST-26 (for example, the bridge raise operation did not require crew exit). Nevertheless, the UST-26 had its own disadvantages.

== Remotely controlled tanks ==
TT-26 teletank with a flame-thrower at Kubinka Tank Museum

- TT-26 — Teletank

== Self-propelled guns ==
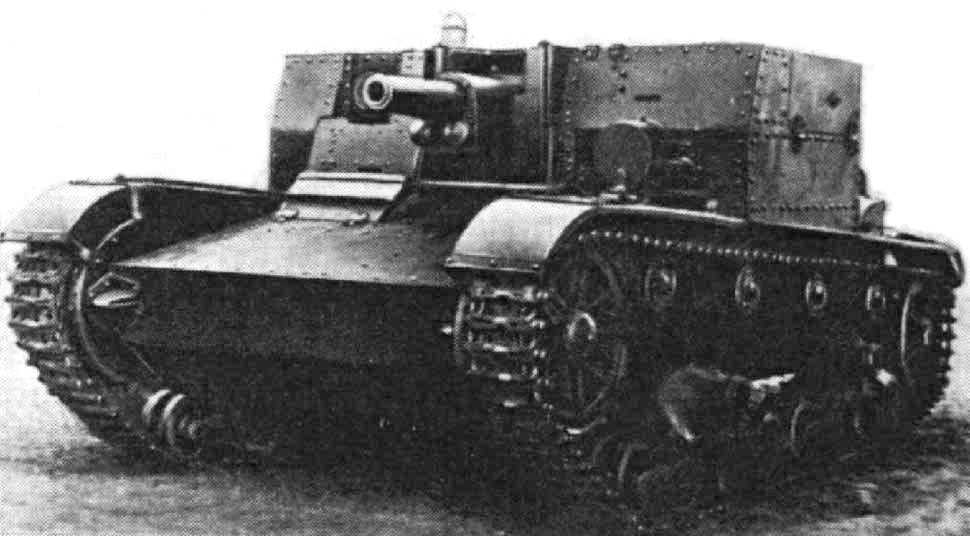
Artillery tank AT-1 armed with 76.2mm PS-3 tank gun

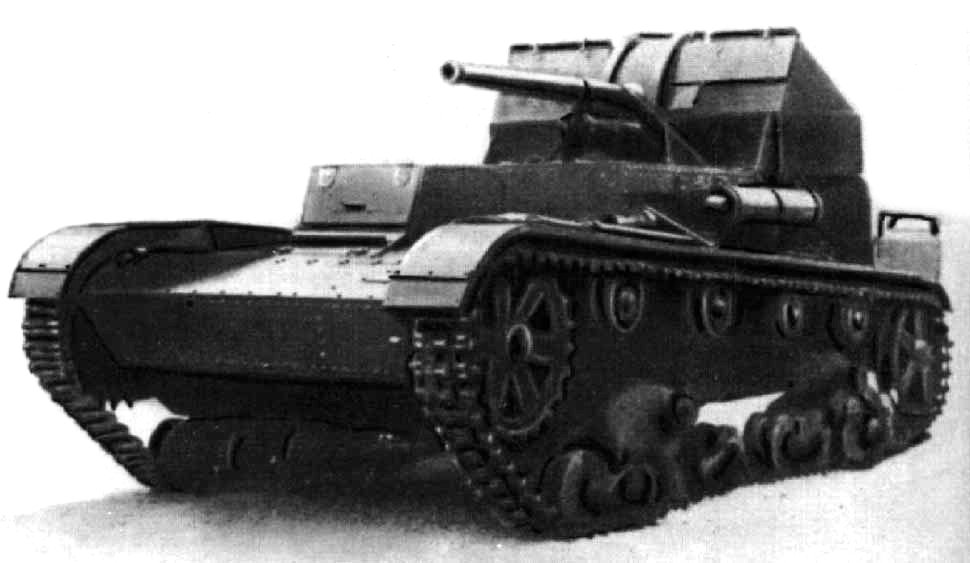
Self-propelled gun SU-5-1 armed with 76.2mm divisional gun mod. 1902/30

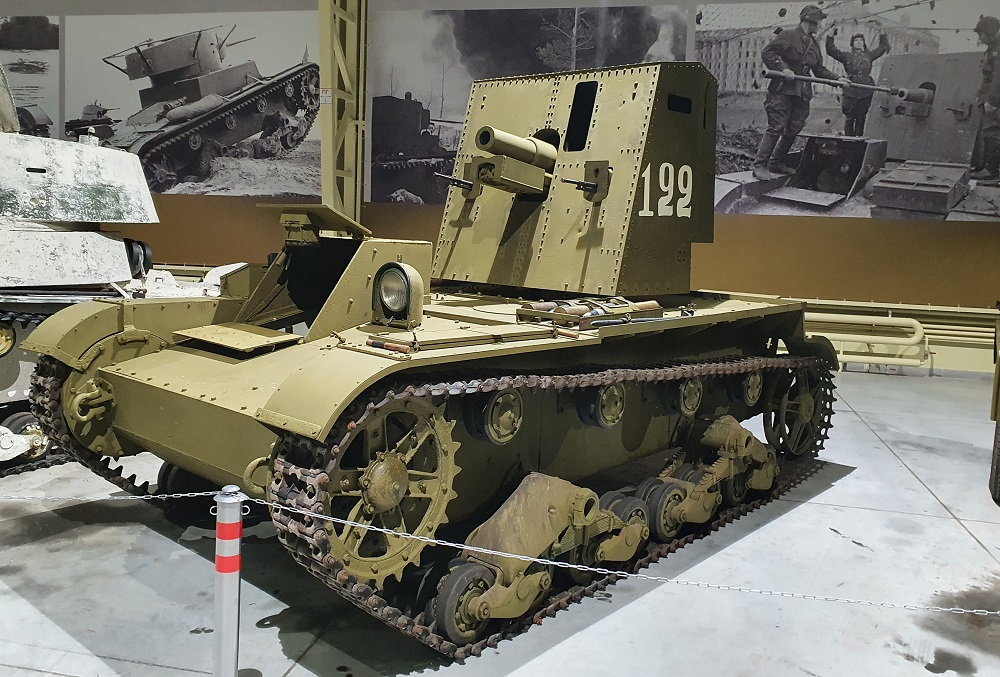
SU-26 in the Museum of Russian Military History.

- SU-1 — Self-propelled gun armed with 76.2 mm regimental gun mod. 1927. The single fully armoured vehicle was built and tested in 1931.
- AT-1 — Artillery tank (tank of artillery support) armed with 76.2 mm PS-3 or L-7 tank gun. Two fully armoured vehicles were built and tested in 1935, 10 AT-1 artillery tanks were planned to be built in 1936 but were cancelled (Izhora Works produced 8 armoured hulls for the program).
- SU-5-1 — Self-propelled gun armed with the 76 mm divisional gun M1902/30 (open-top type, the single vehicle was built in 1934).
- SU-5-2 — Self-propelled gun armed with 122 mm howitzer M1910/30 (open-top type; a single vehicle was built in 1934 and a further 30 vehicles in 1936).
- SU-5-3 — Self-propelled gun armed with 152.4 mm divisional mortar mod. 1931 (open-top type, a single vehicle was built in 1934).
- SU-6 — Self-propelled gun armed with 76.2 mm 3K anti-aircraft gun (open-top type, a single vehicle was built in 1935 and 4 more vehicles armed with 37 mm anti-aircraft automatic gun were planned to be produced in 1936).
- SU-T-26 (SU-26, later SU-76P) — Self-propelled gun of an open-top design armed with a 37 mm gun or a 76.2mm regimental gun mod. 1927. The Factory of Hoisting-and-Conveying Machinery named after S.M. Kirov (in Leningrad) built 14 vehicles in 1941: probably 2 with a 37 mm gun and 12 with a 76 mm gun.

== Armoured transport vehicles ==
- TR-4 — Armoured personnel carrier
- TR-26 — Armoured personnel carrier
- TR4-1 — Ammunition transportation vehicle
- TB-26 — Ammunition transportation vehicle
- T-26Ts — Fuel transportation vehicle
- TTs-26 — Fuel transportation vehicle

== Reconnaissance vehicles ==
- TN (TN stands for tank nablyudeniya or "observation tank")

an experimental observation version based on the T-26T artillery tractor chassis and intended for reconnaissance of front lines and enemy firing-points; also for correction of artillery fire. Developed by the Design Office of the Military Supply Depot No. 37 in Moscow in September 1934. The single vehicle was built by the Factory No. 185 named after S.M. Kirov in Leningrad and tested with some success in 1935 (nevertheless, the further work was stopped). The TN had an armoured cabin instead of a tank turret, armed with a bow DT tank machine gun (4,980 rds.). Equipment consisted of a 71-TK-1 radio station with a hand-rail antenna around the cabin, a Zeiss optical rangefinder (with a 500 mm base length), a PTK tank commander panoramic sight, gyrocompass, course plotter, field dead-reckoning analyzer, predictor, map-board, SPVO signalling lamp and two UNAF telephones with a cable spool.

Specifications: weight - 8.1 tonnes (8.9 short tons); crew - 3 men; armour - 6–15 mm (0.24–0.59 in); speed - 28 km/h (17 mph); range - 130 km (81 mi).

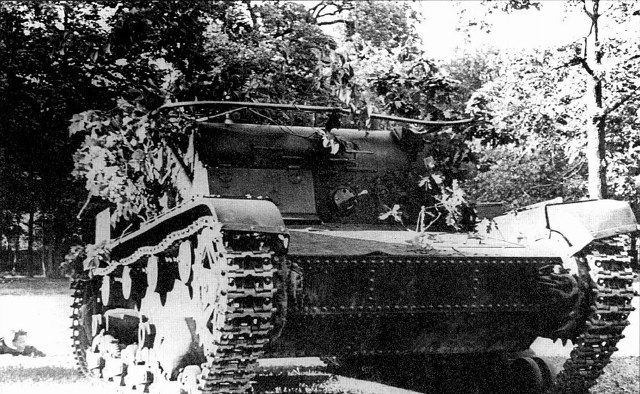
BSNP reconnaissance vehicle. Note the hand-rail radio antenna and two windows for an optical rangefinder on the front side of the armoured cabin. Anti-tank training of soldiers of People's Militia rifle divisions, Leningrad area. July 1941.

- BSNP

The TN, stored at the Factory No. 185, was subsequently rebuilt as the BSNP (bronirovanniy samokhodniy nablyudatel'niy punkt - "armoured self-propelled observation post"), developed by the Artillery Advanced Courses for Command Staff and the Research Institute No. 22 in 1939. The BSNP was equipped with a 71-TK radio station, an Invert optical rangefinder (with 700 mm base length), PTK tank commander panoramic sight, tank magnetic compass, PDN retractable periscope of long-range observation (with 10x optical magnification and 5° angle), two field telephones with two cable spools and a real-time course plotter developed by the Research Institute No. 22. The vehicle was tested in summer 1939 at the Luga Artillery Proving Ground. The inspection commission came to the conclusion that the BSNP was a very useful vehicle for artillery general-purpose reconnaissance and for co-ordination of artillery with tank and infantry units on the battlefield, but that the quality of equipment and its installation was not a successful use of the vehicle. It was recommended to improve the vehicle but all further work was stopped.

- T-26FT (FT stands for foto tank or "photo tank")

An experimental reconnaissance vehicle based on the T-26 mod. 1933 tank chassis, the T-26FT was intended for filming and photography of enemy defensive positions (both at a halt and while on the move). The T-26FT had the usual cylindrical tank turret with a hand-rail antenna, but the 45 mm gun was removed (replaced with a dummy wooden gun); armament consisted of the DT tank machine gun (441 rds.) only. On the left side of the turret two small holes (80 mm in diameter) with electrically driven armoured lids were fitted for camera lenses. There were two special compartments inside the vehicle: one for filming and photography (equipped with a Kinamo heavy semi-automatic photographic camera, a motion-picture camera, a periscope synchronized with both cameras and a radio station), and one for photographic development (equipped with an Anschütz gyrocompass navigation device, magnifier and developing apparatus). The crew consisted of 3 men (a driver and two camera operators). The single vehicle was built by the Military Supply Depot No. 37 in Moscow in 1937 and tested at the Kubinka Tank Proving Ground in January–February 1938. The vehicle had no further development.

== Artillery tractors ==
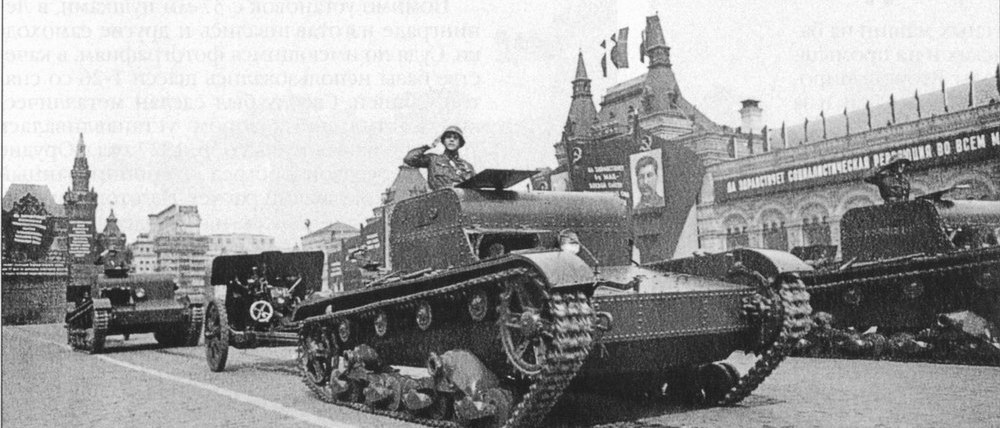
T-26T artillery tractors (with an armoured cabin) towed 76.2 mm divisional guns F-22 mod. 1936. Military parade on Red Square, Moscow. May 1, 1937.

- T-26T (T stands for tyagach or "prime mover", "tractor") — armoured artillery tractor based on the T-26 chassis. Two unarmed variants were developed in 1932 according to the "Program of tank, tractor and armoured car armament of the RKKA": one with a canvas cover designed by the Artillery Design Office of the Bolshevik Factory (some sources mention this vehicle as the T-26T2) and one with an armoured cabin designed by the Artillery Academy. The canvas cover had celluloid windows along the perimeter. The armoured cabin had a double-wing driver hatch in the front, two hatches on the roof and lookout hatches on the sides and rear (some vehicles did not have the rear hatches). T-26T artillery tractors had riveted or welded hulls (late models). The vehicle was equipped with a special towing device for towing 76.2 mm divisional guns, 122–152 mm howitzers and trailers up to 7 tonnes (7.7 short tons) weight.

Specifications: weight - 7.77–8.1 tonnes (8.56–8.93 short tons); crew - 1 (driver) + 4-5 (gun crew or landing party); armour - 6–15 mm (0.24–0.59 in); speed - 28 km/h (17 mph), 15 km/h (9.3 mph) with a 5-t trailer; range - 120 km (75 mi) with a 5-t trailer.

One hundred and eighty three T-26T were produced in 1933. Fourteen more with a high-powered engine and improved towing device were produced in 1936 (including 10 with an armoured cabin). The manufacturer was the Factory No. 174 named after K.E. Voroshilov in Leningrad (a plan to produce 200 T-26T with a canvas cover and 150 T-26T with an armoured cabin annually was not carried out due to increases in tank production). Tests and army service showed that T-26T artillery tractors were underpowered for cross-country towing of trailers weighing more than 5 tonnes (5.5 short tons), so these vehicles had no further development. Also around 20 T-26 light tanks of early models were converted into artillery tractors by army units in 1937–1939. A transfer of overhauled old twin-turreted T-26 tanks (without turrets and armament) from some tank units of western military districts for use as artillery tractors for anti-tank and regimental guns in mechanized corps began in May 1941.

Tank and mechanized infantry units of the Red Army had 211 artillery tractors based on the T-26 chassis on June 1, 1941. Almost all T-26T artillery tractors of border and some inner military districts were lost during the first weeks of the Great Patriotic War. A few remained in front-line service until 1942 at least (for example, the 150th Tank Brigade of the Bryansk Front had a T-26T with an armoured cabin on May 15, 1942, which was used as a command vehicle).

No less than 50 old twin-turreted T-26 tanks of the Transbaikal Military District were converted into artillery tractors from 1941; these vehicles participated in combat with the Japanese Kwantung Army in August 1945.

== Armoured carriers ==
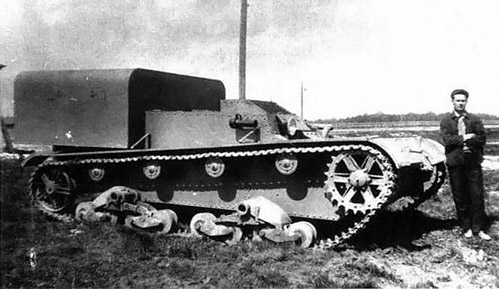
TR-1 armoured carrier

- TR-1. In early 1933, a prototype of armoured personnel carrier for mechanized units based on the T-26 chassis was manufactured according to the "Program of tank, tractor and armoured car armament of the RKKA". The TR-1 armoured personnel carrier was developed by students of the Military Academy of Mechanization and Motorization named after I. Stalin, and produced at the Leningrad Factory of Experimental Mechanical Engineering. An engine (90 hp (67 kW) Hercules) and transmission were located at the front of the vehicle, and an armoured cabin for infantrymen, equipped with a rear door and six portholes in side walls, was located in the rear. The TR-1 was an unarmed vehicle. In August–October 1933 this armoured personnel carrier has passed extensive tests at Kubinka proving ground.

Specifications: full weight - 9.445 tonnes (10.411 short tons); crew - 2 (driver and commander) + 14 men (landing party); armour - 4–10 mm (0.16–0.39 in).

== Series production ==
Around 1,701 armoured combat vehicles based on the T-26 chassis were produced in the USSR from 1932 till 1941.

	1932	1933	1934	1935	1936	1937	1938	1939	1940	1941	Total
KhT-26	9^{1}	106	430	7	-	-	-	-	-	-	552
KhT-130	-	-	-	-	10	-	290	101	-	-	401
KhT-133	-	-	-	-	-	-	-	4^{2}	265	-	269
KhT-134	-	-	-	-	-	-	-	-	2	-	2
ST-26	3	-	44	20	2	1	-	1	-	-	71
TT-26 and TU-26^{3}	-	33	-	-	74	-	55	-	-	-	162
SU-5	-	-	-	3^{4}	30	-	-	-	-	-	33
T-26T	-	183	-	-	14	-	-	-	-	-	197
SU-26	-	-	-	-	-	-	-	-	-	14^{5}	14

- ^{1}Delivered to customer in 1933
- ^{2}Prototypes
- ^{3}Teletanks and control tanks of all types
- ^{4}Prototypes of SU-5-1, SU-5-2, SU-5-3
- ^{5}Produced in Leningrad at the "Factory of Carrying-and-conveying Machines named after S. Kirov"

== Vehicle-mounted engineer equipment ==
Many different attached implements for the T-26 light tank were developed in the USSR in the 1930s. Among these were mine sweeps, equipment for swimming, snorkels for deep fording, wooden and brushwood fascines for trench crossing, special extra-wide swamp tracks and mats, wire cutters, dozer blades and many others. All of them were tested but despite often excellent test results none (except some mine sweeps) passed into army service.

- Tank mine sweeps. Several mine sweeps of different designs for the T-26 and ST-26 (minus its bridge) tanks were developed in the USSR, but none of them were passed into army service. Three models of mine plows (suspended from a front frame, operated with a hand cable winch and with special blades) were tested in 1932–1934. Trials showed very poor performance of such types of mine-sweep on compacted soil or scrubby land. The much more successful KMT-26 mine roller (weight 1.55 t, mine-sweeping speed 6–8 km/h, able to absorb up to 3 anti-tank mine explosions) was developed and tested in July 1934; three such mine-exploding rollers were produced. An experimental mine flail was tested in August–September 1939 also. Mine sweeps could be mounted on T-26 or ST-26 tanks in 1.5 hours and jettisoned without crew exit if necessary.

Design work started again when the Winter War began: Leningrad factories Kirov Factory, Factory No. 185 and Factory No. 174 developed new models of mine sweeps for the T-26 and T-28 tanks in December 1939. Kirov Factory produced 93 new mine sweeps and Factory No. 174 produced an additional 49. These disc mine sweeps (metal discs 700–900 mm in diameter with a thickness of 10–25 mm on a common axis; the weight of the whole construction was 1,800-3,000 kg) were issued to army field forces in February and March 1940. Despite low explosion resistance (the discs would bend after the first mine explosion), these mine sweeps were used successfully by the 35th tank brigade and tank battalions of the 8th Army during the Winter War.

- Fascines. Three types of remotely released large fascines (brushwood, wooden and a canvas bag stuffed with straw) for trench crossing were developed for the T-26 and the ST-26 in 1937–1939. These fascines made possible the crossing of trenches and antitank ditches 3.5 m wide and 1.2 m deep. Only ten sets of wooden fascines were produced. The fascines somewhat restricted the field of fire of the main gun.
- Wire cutters. Factory No. 174 developed special wire cutters for T-26 tanks in 1940. The automatically operated TN-3 tank wire cutters were intended for breaching enemy wire obstacles. They were located on the rear of the vehicle over the tank tracks, cutting off wire caught in the tracks. Trials performed in October 1940 in Kubinka proving ground demonstrated that the design needed improvement.
- Snowplow. The ST-26 engineer tank with a mounted snowplow from the Ya-5 truck was tested in Kubinka proving ground in 1933. In 1935 a special tank snowplow for the ST-26 was developed for clearing roads of 3 m width, in snow up to 1.2 m deep. The snowplow could be mounted on the ST-26 in 15 min. It was officially passed into army service but follow-up trials indicated that it could not clear even 0.6-0.8 m deep snow.
- Other equipment. Between 1934 and 1940 the following equipment for the T-26 tank was developed and tested: brushwood mats and wooden planks for swamp crossing, special water/bog tracks (of 520 mm width), automatic coupling equipment for two tanks intended for crossing trenches of 3.8-4.2 m width, an implement for destroying antitank teeth and road-blocks, a magnetic mine detector, different track grousers.
