= T-26 =

Soviet light infantry tank

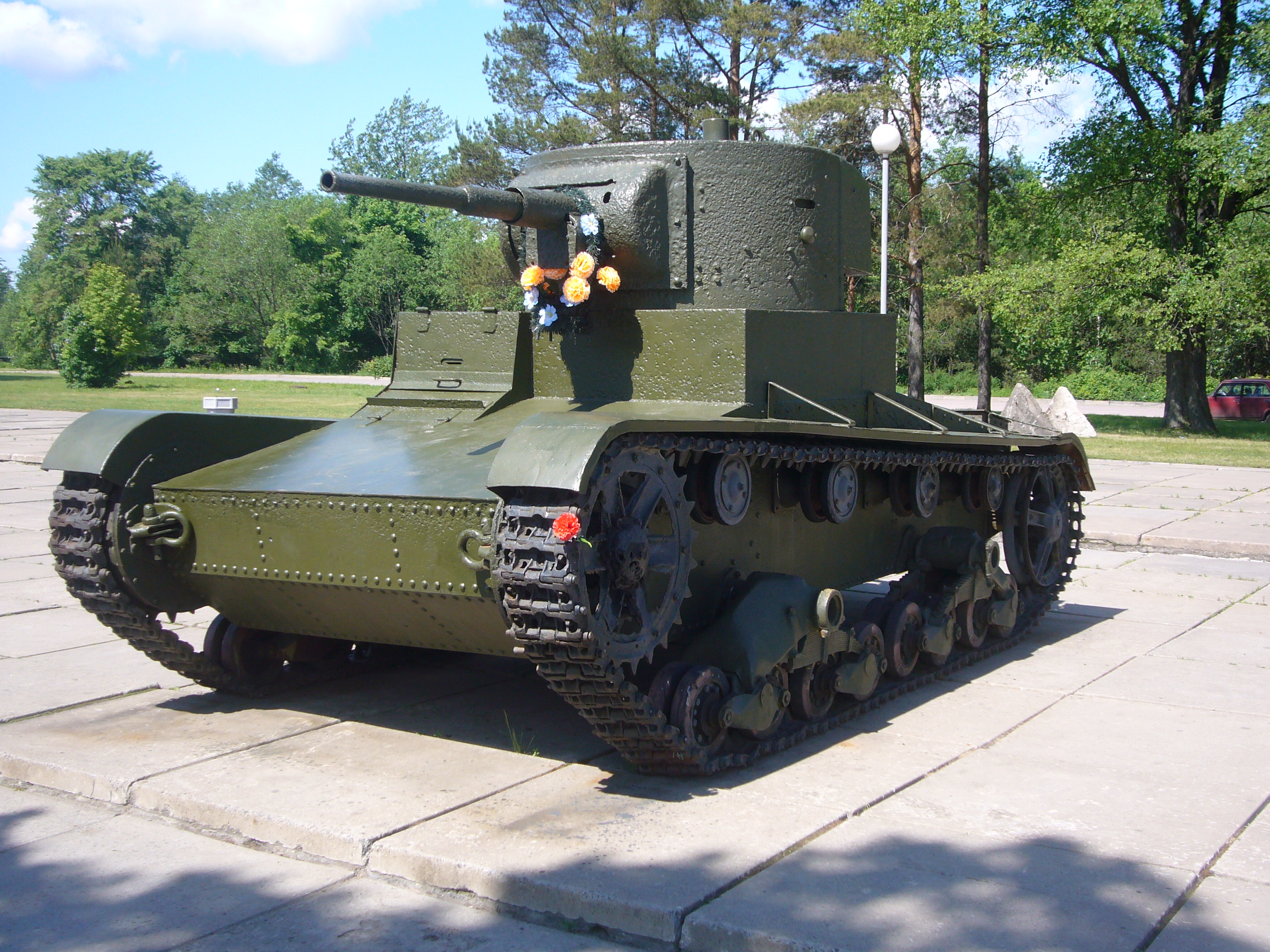
- T-26 mod. 1933 at the "Breaching of the Leningrad Blockade" museum near Kirovsk, Leningrad Oblast. This tank was raised from the river bottom at Nevsky Pyatachok in May 2003.
- Type: Light tank
- Place of origin: Soviet Union

Service history
- In service: 1931–45 in the USSR; 1936–53 in Spain; 1940–61 in Finland; 1938–49 in China
- Used by: See Operators
- Wars: Spanish Civil War; Second Sino-Japanese War; Soviet–Japanese border conflicts; Soviet invasion of Poland; Anglo-Soviet invasion of Iran; World War II; Winter War; Chinese Civil War

Production history
- Designer: Vickers-Armstrongs, OKMO of Bolshevik Plant in Leningrad
- Designed: 1928–31
- Manufacturer: K.E. Voroshilov factory No. 174, Leningrad, Stalingrad Tractor Factory
- Produced: 1931–41
- No. built: 10,300 tanks and 1,701 other vehicles

Specifications (T-26 mod. 1933)
- Mass: 9.6 tonnes (10.6 short tons)
- Length: 4.65 m (15 ft 3 in)
- Width: 2.44 m (8.0 ft)
- Height: 2.24 m (7 ft 4 in)
- Crew: 3 (commander, gunner, driver)
- Main armament: 45 mm 20K mod. 1932–34 tank gun (122 rounds)
- Secondary armament: 7.62 mm DT machine gun (2,961 rounds)
- Engine: Straight 4-cylinder petrol air-cooled 6.6-litre T-26 (Armstrong Siddeley type); 90 hp (67 kW) at 2,100 rpm
- Power/weight: 9.38 hp/t
- Transmission: gearbox with five gears
- Suspension: quarter-elliptic leaf springs
- Ground clearance: 380 mm (15 in)
- Fuel capacity: 290 L (64 imp gal; 77 U.S. gal) with additional 110 L (24 imp gal; 29 US gal) fuel tank
- Operational range: Road: 220–240 km (140–150 mi); Off-road: 130–140 km (81–87 mi)
- Maximum speed: Paved: 31.1 km/h (19.3 mph); Gravel: 22 km/h (14 mph); Off-road: 16 km/h (9.9 mph)

The T-26 tank was a Soviet light tank used during many conflicts of the Interwar period and in World War II. It was a development of the British Vickers 6-Ton tank and was one of the most successful tank designs of the 1930s until its light armour became vulnerable to newer anti-tank guns. It was produced in greater numbers than any other tank of the period, with more than 11,000 units manufactured, giving it the title of the most produced tank during the interwar period. During the 1930s, the USSR developed 53 variants of the T-26, including flame-throwing tanks, combat engineer vehicles, remotely controlled tanks, self-propelled guns, artillery tractors, and armoured carriers. Twenty-three of these were series-produced; others were experimental models.

The T-26 and BT were the main tanks of the Red Army's armoured forces during the interwar period. The T-26 was the most important tank of the Spanish Civil War and played a significant role during the Battle of Lake Khasan in 1938, as well as in the Winter War in 1939–40. Though nearly obsolete by the beginning of World War II, the T-26 was the most numerous tank in the Red Army's armoured force during the German invasion of the Soviet Union in June 1941. The T-26 fought the Germans and their allies during the Battle of Moscow in 1941–42, the Battle of Stalingrad and the Battle of the Caucasus in 1942–1943; some tank units of the Leningrad Front used their T-26s until 1944. Soviet T-26 light tanks last saw use in August 1945, during the defeat of the Japanese Kwantung Army in Manchuria.

The T-26 was exported and used extensively by Spain, China and Turkey. Captured T-26s were used by the Finnish, German, Romanian and Hungarian armies. The tank was reliable and simple to maintain, and its design was continually modernised between 1931 and 1941. No new models of the T-26 were developed after 1940.

== British origin ==
The T-26 (along with the Polish 7TP) was a development of the British Vickers 6-Ton (Vickers Mk.E variant) tank, which was designed by the Vickers-Armstrongs company in 1928–29. The simple and easy-to-maintain Vickers 6-Ton was intended for export to less technically advanced countries: the Soviet Union, Poland, Brazil, Argentina, Japan, Thailand, China, and many others. Vickers advertised the tank in military publications, and both the Soviet Union and Poland expressed interest in the Vickers design.

In early 1930, the Soviet buying committee, under the direction of Semyon Ginzburg, arrived in the UK to select tanks, tractors, and cars for use in the Red Army. The Vickers 6-Ton was among four tank models selected by Soviet representatives during their visit to Vickers-Armstrongs. Under the contract signed on 28 May 1930, the company delivered to the USSR 15 twin-turreted Vickers Mk.E (Type A, armed with two .303 in (7.71 mm) water-cooled Vickers machine guns) tanks together with full technical documentation to enable series production of the tank in the USSR. The ability of the two turrets of the Type A to turn independently made it possible to fire to both the left and right at once, which was considered advantageous for breakthroughs of field entrenchments. Several Soviet engineers participated in assembly of the tanks at the Vickers factory in 1930.

The first four Vickers 6-Ton tanks arrived in the USSR at the end of 1930. The last tanks arrived in 1932, when series production of the T-26 was already in progress. The British tanks were sent to Soviet factories for study in preparation for series production and to military educational institutions and training units. Later, some tanks were given to military supply depots and proving grounds. The Vickers-built 6-Ton tanks were called V-26 in the USSR. Three British tanks were tested for cross-country ability at the small proving ground near Moscow on Poklonnaya Hill in January 1931. Kliment Voroshilov ordered the creation of the "Special Commission for the Red Army (RKKA) new tanks" under the direction of S. Ginzburg to define the tank type suitable for the Red Army. The T-19 8-ton light infantry tank, developed by S. Ginzburg under that programme at the Bolshevik Plant in Leningrad, was a competitor to the British Vickers 6-Ton. The first prototype of the complex and expensive T-19 was finished in August 1931. Because both tanks had advantages and disadvantages, S. Ginzburg suggested developing a more powerful, hybrid tank (the so-called "improved" T-19) with the hull, home-developed engine and armament from the native T-19, and the transmission and chassis from the British Vickers 6-Ton.

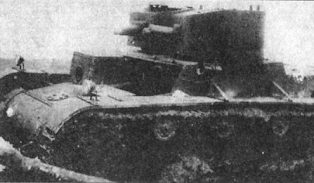
The prototype of the TMM-1 light infantry tank during tests in early 1932

On 26 January 1931, I. Khalepsky, Head of the Department of Mechanisation and Motorisation of the RKKA, wrote a letter to S. Ginzburg with information obtained via the intelligence service that the Polish government had decided to purchase Vickers 6-Ton light infantry tanks as well as Christie M1931 cavalry tanks and to mass-produce them with the assistance of both the British and French. Because Poland was then considered, in Soviet military doctrine, to be the USSR's main enemy, the Soviet Revolutionary Military Council decided to pass the foreign tanks into Red Army service, starting their production immediately without waiting for the completion of development works, in order to counter possible aggression. At that time, the RKKA had only several dozen outdated Mark V heavy tanks and Medium Mk.A and Renault FT tanks, captured during the Russian Civil War, together with various armoured cars and obsolescent domestic MS-1 (T-18) light infantry tanks. On 13 February 1931, the Vickers 6-Ton light infantry tank, under the designator T-26, officially entered service in the Red Army as the "main tank for close support of combined arms units and tank units of High Command Reserve".

One of the Vickers 6-Ton tanks (equipped with Soviet-made turrets for the pilot batch of T-26 tanks) was tested for gunfire resistance in August 1931. The hull was subjected to rifle and Maxim machine gun fire with the use of normal and armour-piercing bullets at a range of 50 m (160 ft). It was found that the armour withstood gunfire with minimal damage (only some rivets were damaged). Chemical analysis showed that the front armour plates were made from high-quality cemented armour ("S.t.a Plat" according to Vickers-Armstrongs classification), whereas the homogenous roof and bottom armour plates were made from mediocre steel. Even so, the British armour was better than armour produced by Izhora Factory for the first T-26s because of a shortage of modern metallurgical equipment in the USSR at that time.

At the same time, the Faculty of Mechanisation and Motorisation of the Military Technical Academy named after F.E. Dzerzhinsky developed two tank models (TMM-1 and TMM-2) based on the Vickers 6-Ton tank design but with an American Hercules 95 hp (71 kW) six-cylinder water-cooled engine, improved front armour (to 15–20 mm), and a driver's position on the left side. TMM stands for tank maloy moshchnosti or "tank of low power". The TMM-1 was equipped with transmission details from the native Ya-5 truck and a ball mount for the DT tank machine gun in front of the hull, whereas the TMM-2 was equipped with an improved gearbox, a clutchless steering device and a 37 mm Hotchkiss gun in the right turret. Representatives from the main Soviet tank manufacturers together with officials from the RKKA Mobilization Department considered the Hercules engine to be too difficult to produce, and the engine tended to overheat inside the engine compartment. Tests of TMM-1 and TMM-2 prototypes performed in the beginning of 1932 demonstrated no advantage over the Vickers 6-Ton and the T-26 (the TMM-2's maneuverability was found to be even worse).

== Design ==
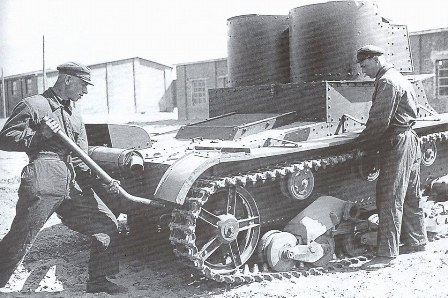
Maintenance of the T-26 mod. 1931 (with riveted hull and turrets). This tank was produced in the first half of 1932—the exhaust silencer is mounted with two clamps and the cover over the air outlet window. The Moscow Military District. Mid-1934.

The Soviets did not simply replicate the Vickers 6-Ton. However, like its British counterpart, the T-26 mod. 1931 had a twin-turreted configuration and was designed to carry two machine guns, mounting one in each turret. A major difference was that the Soviet T-26 mod. 1931 had higher turrets (with an observation slit) than the British 6-Ton. Soviet turrets had a round firing port for the Degtyarev light machine gun, as opposed to the rectangular ports used by the original British design for the Vickers machine gun. The front part of the hull was also slightly modified.

Hulls of twin-turreted T-26s were assembled using armoured plates riveted to a frame from metal angles. Some tanks, produced in 1931, had sealing zinc shims at the hull bottom between armoured plates for fording water obstacles. After problems with rain entering the engine compartment, a special cover was installed over an air outlet window after March 1932. Some T-26s produced at the end of 1932–1933 had a riveted and welded hull. The T-26 mod. 1931 had two cylindrical turrets mounted on ball bearings; each turret turned independently through 240°. Both turrets could provide common fire in front and rear arcs of fire (100° each). The disadvantage of such a configuration was that not all of the tank's firepower could be used at once on the same side. Four turret modifications existed, and they were mounted on tanks in different combinations (for instance, a tank with a riveted hull could have riveted and welded turrets).

The hull and turrets of the T-26 mod. 1931 had a maximum armour thickness of 13–15 mm (until 1938, see below), which was sufficient to withstand light machine gun fire. Many twin-turreted tanks of the first series had 10 mm armour plates of low quality, which could be penetrated by 7.62 mm armour-piercing bullets from 150 m (490 ft)

In 1933, the Soviets unveiled the T-26 mod. 1933. This model, which had a new single cylindrical turret carrying one 45-mm cannon L/46 (length in calibers, which meant quite high initial velocity, over 700–800 m/s depending on ammunition) and one 7.62 mm machine gun, became the most common T-26 variant. The 45 mm 20K tank gun was based on the Soviet 45 mm anti-tank gun M1932 (19-K) and it was one of the most powerful anti-tank guns of its time. The T-26 could carry up to three secondary DT 7.62 mm machine guns in coaxial, rear, and anti-aircraft mounts. This increased firepower was intended to aid crews in defeating dedicated anti-tank teams, as the original machine gun armament had been found insufficient. The turret rear ball mounting for the additional DT tank machine gun was installed on the T-26 tanks from the end of 1935 until 1939.

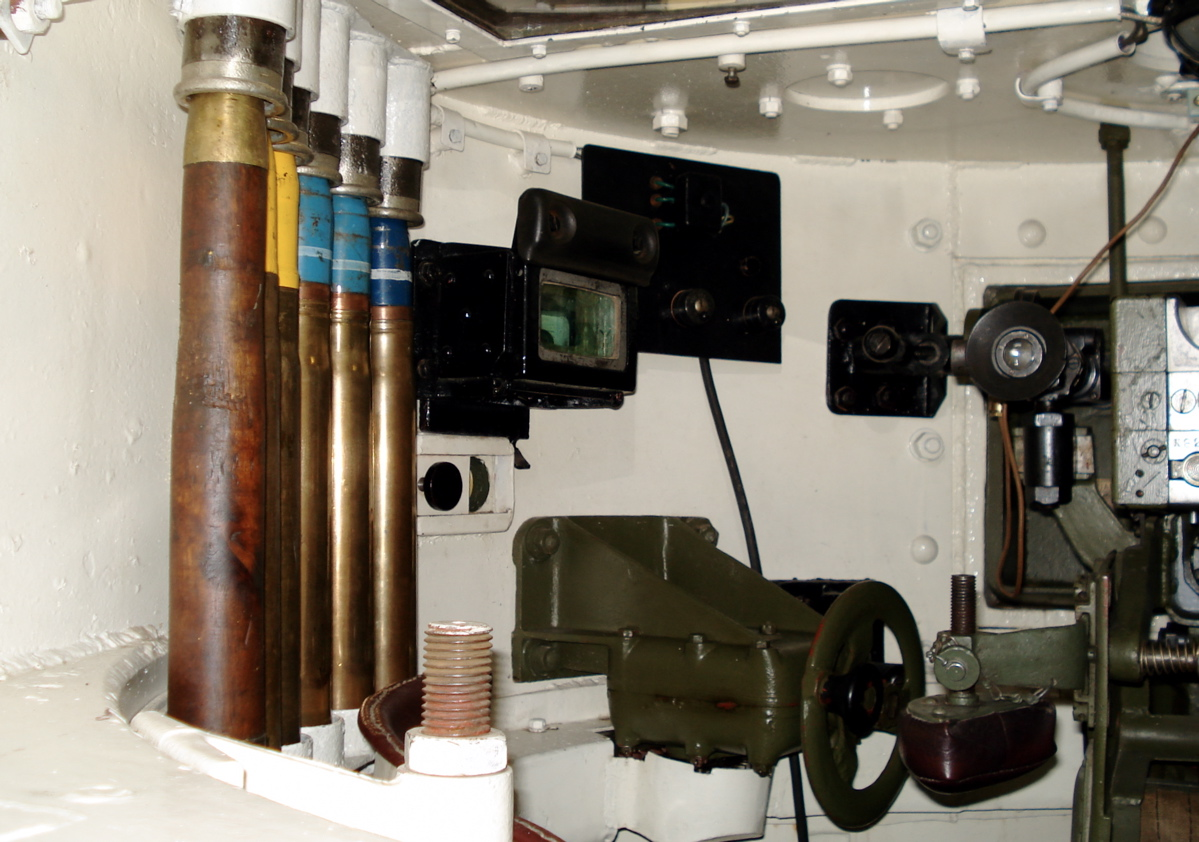
Interior of T-26 mod. 1933 turret. Ammunition stowage is on the left side. The side observation device is visible, as is the revolver firing port, which is closed with a plug. Parola Tank Museum in Finland.

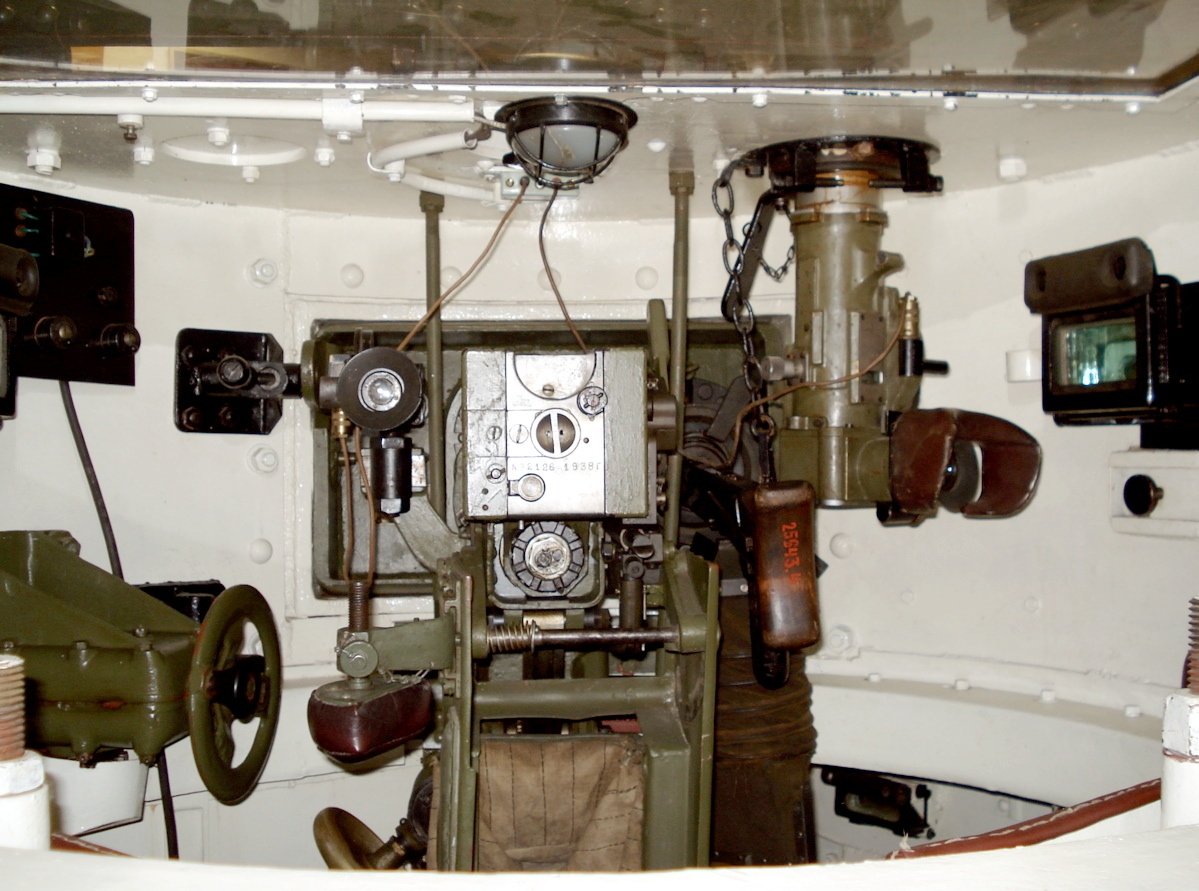
Interior of T-26 mod. 1933 turret, looking forward at the 45 mm 20K tank gun breech. The TOP-1 telescopic sight is to the left, and the coaxial DT tank machine gun and PT-K commander panoramic sight is to the right. Parola Tank Museum in Finland.

The T-26 Model 1933 carried 122 rounds of 45 mm ammunition, firing armour-piercing 45 mm rounds with a muzzle velocity of 820 m/s (2,700 ft/s), or lower-velocity high-explosive munitions. Tanks intended for company commanders were equipped with a radio set and a hand-rail radio antenna on the turret (so called "radio tanks"). Later the hand-rail antenna was replaced with a whip antenna, because experience in the Spanish Civil War and Battle of Lake Khasan showed that the hand-rail antenna drew fire onto commander tanks.

The tank was powered by a GAZ T-26 90 hp (67 kW) straight 4-cylinder air-cooled petrol engine, which was a complete Soviet copy of the Armstrong Siddeley engine used in the Vickers 6-Ton. The engine was located in the rear part of the hull. Early Soviet-made tank engines were of bad quality but they became better beginning in 1934. The engine did not have an over-speed limiter, which often resulted in overheating and engine valve breakage, especially in summer. A fuel tank for 182 L (40 imp gal; 48 U.S. gal) and an oil box for 27 L (5.9 imp gal; 7.1 U.S. gal) were placed alongside the engine. The engine required top-grade petrol; the use of second-rate petrol could cause damage to the valve units because of engine detonation. From mid-1932, a more capacious fuel tank – 290 L (64 imp gal; 77 U.S. gal) instead of 182 L (40 imp gal; 48 U.S. gal) – and a simplified oil box were introduced. An engine cooling fan was mounted over the engine in a special shroud. From early 1932, the exhaust silencer was affixed by three clamps instead of two.

The transmission of the T-26 consisted of single-disc main dry clutch connected to a gearbox, with five gears, in the front part of the vehicle by drive shaft passing through the vehicle. Steering was through steering clutches and band brakes. The gear change lever was mounted directly on the gearbox.

Suspension (for each side) consisted of two bogies, four rubber-covered return rollers, a track driving wheel and a track idler. Each bogie consisted of a cast box with four twin rubber-covered road wheels connected by balancing levers and two one-quarter elliptic leaf springs. The cast track driving wheel with removable sprocket ring was located in front, and the track idler with a crank lever tightener was located at the rear of the vehicle. The track was made from chrome-nickel steel 260 mm (10 in) wide and consisted of 108–109 links.

The T-26 mod. 1931 did not have a radio set. The tank commander communicated with the driver by speaking tube, which was replaced with a signalling lamp in 1932. The T-26 was equipped with a fire extinguisher, a kit of spare parts tools and accessories (including a tank jack), canvas stowage, and a tow chain fixed on the rear of the hull.

The T-26 could cross 0.75-metre (2.5 ft)-high vertical obstacles and 2.1-metre (6.9 ft)-wide trenches, ford 0.8-metre (2.6 ft)-deep water, cut 33-centimetre (13 in)-thick trees, and climb 40° gradients. Needless to say, it was easy to drive.

Beginning in 1937, there was an effort to equip many tanks with a second machine gun in the rear of the turret and an anti-aircraft machine gun on top of it, as well as the addition of two searchlights above the gun for night gunnery, a new VKU-3 command system, and a TPU-3 intercom. Some tanks had a vertically stabilised TOP-1 gun telescopic sight. Ammunition stowage for the main gun was increased from 122 rounds to 147. In 1938, the cylindrical turret was replaced with a conical turret, with the same 45 mm model 1934 gun. Some T-26s mod. 1938/1939, equipped with radio set, had a PTK commander's panoramic sight.

In 1938, the T-26 was upgraded to the model 1938 version, which had a new conical turret with better anti-bullet resistance but the same welded hull as the T-26 mod. 1933 produced in 1935–1936. This proved insufficient in the Battle of Lake Khasan in 1938, so the tank was upgraded once more in February 1939 to have an underturret box with sloped (23°) 20 mm side armoured plates. The turret featured an increase to 20 mm at 18 degrees sloping. This time it was designated T-26-1 (known as the T-26 mod. 1939 in modern sources). There were subsequent attempts to thicken the front plate, but T-26 production soon ended in favour of other designs, such as the T-34.

== Series production ==
=== The beginning ===
In 1931, the only Soviet factory suitable for T-26 production was the Bolshevik Factory in Leningrad, which had had experience of manufacturing the MS-1 (T-18) light tanks since 1927. It was also planned to use the Stalingrad Tractor Factory, which was under construction at that time. But the production of the T-26 proved to be much more complicated than the semi-handicraft assembly of the MS-1, so the planned production of 500 T-26s in 1931 proved to be impossible. The Bolshevik Factory needed to convert all tank drawings from imperial units into metric, in order to develop a production technology, special tools, and equipment. The first 10 T-26s were assembled in July 1931 – they were identical to British Vickers 6-Ton tanks except for their armament. Soviet tanks were armed with the 37 mm Hotchkiss (PS-1) gun in the right turret and the 7.62 mm DT tank machine gun in the left turret. These T-26s from the development batch were of low quality and made from mild steel, but it was an important test of the new tank production technology.

The series production of the T-26, equipped with new higher turrets with observation window, began in August 1931. Such turrets proved to be more suitable for mass production. The production of the T-26 encountered many problems: a lot of armoured hulls and turrets supplied by the Izhora Factory were of low quality (with cracks) and were 10 mm thick instead of the planned 13 mm. Poor production standards were the reason behind the frequent failures of tank engines, gear boxes, springs in suspension, tracks and rubber-covered road wheels of early T-26s. Thirty-five of the 100 T-26s produced by the Bolshevik Factory in 1931 had hulls and turrets made from mild steel. Later, it was planned to replace these hulls with ones built of armour plate as well as to mount engines of better quality. The business plan for 1932 called for 3,000 T-26s. For this, the tank workshop of the Bolshevik Factory was reorganised into the Factory No. 174 named after K.E. Voroshilov in February 1932. The director of the tank factory became K. Sirken and the chief engineer was S. Ginzburg. The problems with organizing the complicated new technological processes, poor production planning of parts suppliers, a great shortage of qualified engineers and technicians as well as of necessary equipment still resulted in many of the tanks being flawed, and they were not accepted by army representatives. On 26 October 1932, the Trust of Special Machine Industry, consisting of four factories, was established to solve the problem of tank production in the USSR. The planned production of T-26s for 1932 was decreased significantly and special attention was given to increasing the quality of the tanks. A production run of the new model single-turreted T-26 armed with the 45 mm gun was launched in mid-1933.

Factory No. 174 also manufactured a few T-26s for military educational institutions. These were dissected tanks to demonstrate the relative position and function of tank components during tank crew training.

Production of T-26 tanks at the Factory No. 174 named after K.E. Voroshilov (Note: Excludes vehicles based on T-26 chassis (see T-26 variants))
	1931	1932	1933	1934	1935	1936	1937	1938	1939	1940	1941	Total
T-26 twin-turreted	100	1361	576	1	—	—	—	—	—	—	—	2,038
T-26 with a single turret	—	—	693	489 (Note: The Voroshilov factory also produced six dismantled sets of T-26 tanks, which were sent to the Stalingrad Tractor Factory.)	553	447	—	—	945	1,018	47 (Note: According to the RKKA data, 116 T-26 tanks were accepted from the factory in mid-1941, but such data includes tanks after overhaul with possible mounting of turrets from KhT-133 flame-throwing tanks with 45 mm guns.)	4,192
T-26 with a single turret (and a radio)	—	—	20	457	650	826	550	716	350 (Note: Including 267 tanks with anti-aircraft machine guns.)	318 (Note: Including 204 tanks with anti-aircraft machine guns.)	—	3,887
Total	100	1,361	1,289	947	1,203	1,273	550	716	1,295	1,336	47	10,117

=== Production in Stalingrad ===
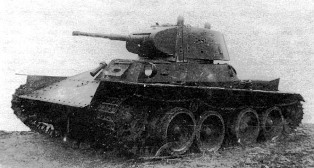
The prototype of STZ-25 (T-25) wheeled-tracked light tank during tests at the Kubinka Tank Proving Ground. September 1939.

The Stalingrad Tractor Factory (STZ) was considered as one of the factories for production of the T-26 from 1932, but production in Stalingrad did not start until August 1933. This process went very slowly, with great difficulties because of delays with deliveries of machining equipment and press tools for the newly built factory. In 1936–1939 the Design Office of the STZ developed several experimental tanks (6 TK, 4 TG, STZ-25, STZ-35) based on the T-26 tank and the STZ-5 transport tractor. For instance, the STZ-25 (T-25) had the turret, rear part of the hull, engine and some transmission details from the T-26 mod. 1938, but the STZ-25 wheeled-tracked tank weighed 11.7 tonnes (12.9 short tons) and had 16–24 mm sloped armour. Factory managers tried to promote tanks of their own design rather than producing T-26s. As a result, the STZ failed to organise the series production of the T-26, but this experience helped to bring the T-34 into production in Stalingrad in 1941. The T-26s produced by STZ had no visual differences from other T-26s, but Stalingrad tanks were less reliable and more expensive.

Production of T-26 tanks at the Stalingrad Tractor Factory
	1933	1934	1935	1936	1937	1938	1939	1940
T-26	5	23	115	?	—	30 (Note: 15 with a cylindrical turret and a radio, 5 with a conical turret and a radio, and 10 with a conical turret.)	?	10

=== Modernization and repair ===
Some early T-26 tanks were repaired in tank units or factories with the use of later production parts. This meant replacing the all-rubber road wheels (except the front wheels) and track idlers with new strengthened ones. Armour was added for the headlight, the armour thickness of the driver's hatch lower door of the twin-turreted tanks was increased from 6 to 10 mm and armoured PT-1 or PTK observation devices were installed. A common hatch above the engine, oil tank, and fuel tank was mounted starting in May 1940. In 1940, 255 T-26s were modernised in this way and in the first half of 1941 another 85 tanks were improved. A central factory responsible for the T-26's repair and modernisation was the Factory of Carrying-and-Conveying Machines named after S. Kirov in Leningrad, and Factory No. 105 named after L. Kaganovich in Khabarovsk from the beginning of the Great Patriotic War until 1945.

=== Production in 1941 ===
Factory No. 174 produced its last T-26 tanks in February 1941. After that, the factory began retooling to produce the new and much more complex T-50 light tank. This work was slowed by delays in the delivery of new equipment and series production of the T-50 did not begin on schedule (planned for 1 June 1941). As a result, factory management decided to resume the production of the T-26, using T-26 hulls, turrets, and other parts already in stock. About 47 T-26 tanks were assembled and 77 were repaired in July–August 1941 before the factory was relocated from Leningrad to Chelyabinsk in the end of August 1941, and then to Chkalov in September 1941. Factory No. 174 produced engines and spare parts for the T-26, installed additional armour plates on some T-26s, replaced flame-throwers with 45 mm tank guns in turrets of 130 KhT-133 flame-throwing tanks, repaired tanks in army units (846 T-26s since the beginning of 1941) and mounted about 75 turrets from the T-26 and the T-50 as bunkers for the defence of Leningrad.

== Combat history ==
The T-26 entered active service for the Red Army (RKKA) in 1932; it was used in many conflicts of the 1930s as well as during World War II. The T-26 together with the BT was the main tank of the RKKA armoured forces during the interwar period.

In the 1930s, T-26 light tanks were delivered to Spain (281 mod. 1933), China (82) and Turkey (60 mod. 1933 and 4 mod. 1931).

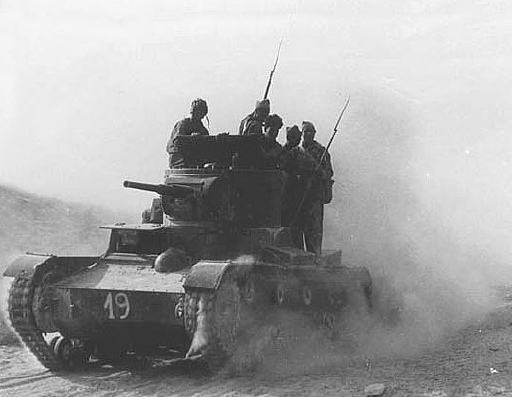
A T-26 operated by Republican forces during the Battle of Belchite in 1937.

The T-26 first saw action in the Spanish Civil War. T-26s were used in almost all Spanish Civil War military operations against the Nationalists from 1936 to 1939 and demonstrated superiority over the German Panzer I light tanks and the Italian CV-33 tankettes, both of which were armed only with machine guns. During the battle of Guadalajara, T-26s outclassed the Italian tankettes, inspiring the design of the first Italian medium tank, the Fiat M13/40. During the war, Nationalist forces would attack the tanks with petrol bombs, the first time such weapons were used in war.

They were used in the Second Sino-Japanese War by the Chinese from 1938 to 1944, especially in the Battle of Kunlun Pass.

The next military operation the T-26 light tank participated in was the Soviet-Japanese border conflict, commencing with the Battle of Lake Khasan, in July 1938. The 2nd Mechanised Brigade together with the 32nd and the 40th Independent Tank Battalions had 257 T-26s, from which 76 tanks were damaged and 9 burnt towards the end of battle action. A small number of T-26 tanks, as well as some flame-throwing tanks based on the T-26 chassis, participated in the Battle of Khalkhin Gol against Japanese forces in 1939. The T-26 was vulnerable to Japanese tank-killing teams armed with Molotov cocktails; poor quality welds left gaps in the armour plate, and flaming petrol easily seeped into the fighting compartment and engine compartment. The 37 mm gun on the Japanese Type 95 light tank, despite its mediocre performance, was also effective against the T-26. Portions of the armour plating on earlier models of the T-26 used riveted construction and were very vulnerable to both types of attacks. The use of riveted armour on some older T-26 models led to "spalling", when the impact of enemy shells, even if they failed to disable the tank or kill the crew on their own, caused the rivets to break off and become projectiles inside the tank.

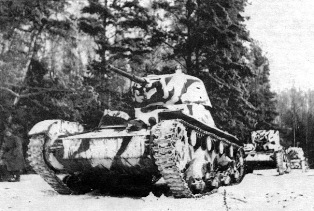
A column of T-26 mod. 1939 and T-26 mod. 1933 light tanks from the 20th Tank Brigade move towards a front line. The Western Front, Battle of Moscow. December 1941.

On the eve of World War II, T-26s served mainly in separate light tank brigades (each brigade had 256–267 T-26s) and in separate tank battalions of the rifle divisions (one company of T-26s consisted of 10–15 tanks). These were the type of tank units that participated in the Soviet invasion of Poland in September 1939 and in the Winter War from December 1939 – March 1940. The Winter War proved that the T-26 was obsolete and its design reserve was totally depleted. Finnish 37 mm antitank guns and even 20 mm antitank rifles easily penetrated the T-26's thin anti-bullet armour and tank units equipped with the T-26 suffered significant losses during the breakthrough of the Mannerheim Line, in which the flame-throwing tanks based on the T-26 chassis played a significant role.

By mid-1941, most of the Red Army's vast numbers of tanks were suffering from serious wear and tear. Poor quality roads, the vulnerabilities of track design in the early 1930s and inadequate maintenance, recovery and repair services all took their toll. In some of the front line armoured units, up to half of the T-26, T-28 and BT tanks had major drive train components (engine, drive train or suspension) that were broken down or worn out and these disabled tanks were parked and cannibalised for spare parts to keep the rest running. Tanks damaged during the 1939 Winter War with Finland were also cannibalised for parts.

On 1 June 1941, the Red Army had 10,268 T-26 light tanks of all models on their inventories, including armoured combat vehicles based on the T-26 chassis. T-26s composed the majority of the fighting vehicles in the Soviet mechanised corps of the border military districts. For instance, the Western Special Military District had 1,136 T-26 tanks on 22 June 1941 (52 percent of all tanks in the district). The T-26 (mod. 1938/39, especially) could withstand most German tanks in 1941 but were inferior to the Panzer III and Panzer IV participating in Operation Barbarossa in June 1941 and all of the Red Army's tank models suffered severe losses due to the air supremacy of the German Luftwaffe. The majority of the Red Army's T-26s were lost in the first months of the German-Soviet War, mainly to enemy artillery and air attacks. Many tanks broke down for technical reasons and lack of spare parts.

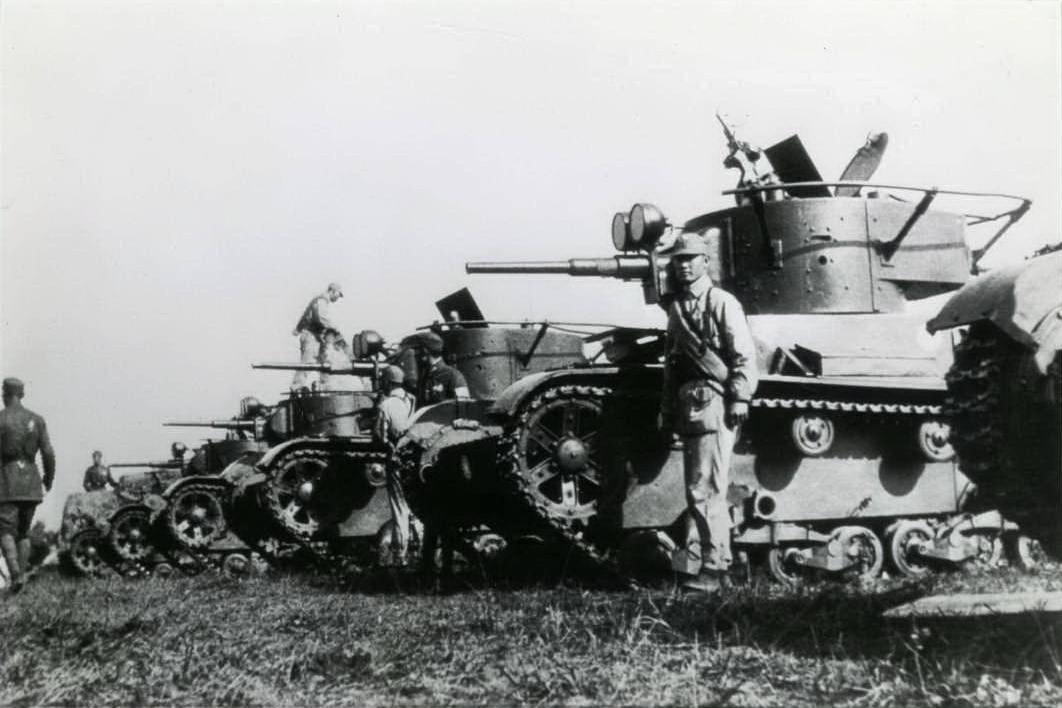
T-26 tanks of Chinese Nationalist Army during WW2

As the war progressed and Germany's lighter tanks were replaced by the Panzer III, Panzer IV and heavier tanks, such as the Panther, the T-26 was gradually replaced through attrition by the vastly superior T-34 (not to be confused with the American heavy T-34 tank). The remaining T-26s participated in battles with the Germans and their allies during the Battle of Moscow from 1941 to 1942, the Battle of Stalingrad and the Battle of the Caucasus from 1942 to 1943. Some tank units of the Leningrad Front used their T-26 tanks until 1944.

The defeat of the Japanese Kwantung Army in Manchuria in August 1945 was the last military operation in which Soviet T-26s were used.

The Finnish Army used captured T-26s of different models during the Continuation War and some tanks served in Finland for various non-combat purposes until 1961. Captured T-26s were also used by the German, Romanian and Hungarian armies. The Romanian-captured vehicles saw some modifications (see below).

== Variants ==
Specifications of the T-26 of different models (according to Factory No. 174 data)
	Weight t	Armour mm				Armament	Ammunition (gun rds. /MG rds.)	Engine power hp	Range (high-road /off-road) km
	Weight t	Front	Side and rear	Roof	Turret	Armament	Ammunition (gun rds. /MG rds.)	Engine power hp	Range (high-road /off-road) km
Twin-turret T-26, 1931	8.2	13–15	13–15	6	13–15	2 × 7.62mm DT	—/ 6615	90	130–140 /70–80
Twin-turret T-26, gun + machine gun, 1932	8.7	13–15	13–15	6	13–15	1 × 37mm + 1 × 7.62mm DT	222/3528	90	130–140 /70–80
T-26 cyl. turret and radio, 1933–1934	9.4	15	15	6–10	15	1 × 45mm + 1 × 7.62mm DT	124 (84) /2961	90	130–140 /70–80
T-26 cyl. turret, extra fuel tank, radio, 1935–1936	9.6	15	15	6–10	15	1 × 45mm + 1 × 7.62mm DT	122 (82) /2961	90	220–240 /130–140
T-26 cyl. turret, rear MG, 1935–1936	9.65	15	15	6–10	15	1 × 45mm + 2 × 7.62mm DT	102/2961	90	220–240 /130–140
T-26 cyl. turret, radio, P-40 AA MG, 1937	9.75	15	15	6–10	15	1 × 45mm + 2 × 7.62mm DT	111 (107) /2772 (3024)	93	220–240 /130–140
T-26 con. turret, rear MG, radio, straight sides of underturret box, 1938	9.8	15	15	6–10	15	1 × 45mm + 2 × 7.62mm DT	107/2772	95	220–240 /130–140
T-26 con. turret, rear MG, sloped sides of underturret box, 1939	10.25	15–20	15	6–10	15–20	1 × 45mm + 2 × 7.62mm DT	185/3528	95	220–240 /130–140

=== Twin-turreted tanks ===
- T-26 model 1931: twin-turreted version armed with two DT tank machine guns. The first series-produced variant of the T-26 that was equipped with turrets differing from the initial Vickers design (Soviet turrets were higher and had an observation window). Tanks produced from 1931 to March 1932 had a riveted hull and turrets, a silencer affixed with two clamps, and lacked any cover over the air outlet window. About 1,177 T-26 mod. 1931 tanks armed with machine guns were accepted by the Red Army, which had 1,015 such twin-turreted tanks on 1 April 1933.

- T-26 model 1931 with gun plus machine gun armament: twin-turreted version with a 37 mm gun in the right turret (some modern sources mention this tank as T-26 model 1932). There were two models of 37 mm guns in the USSR suitable for mounting in light tanks at that time—the Hotchkiss gun (or its Soviet improved variant PS-1), and the more powerful PS-2 gun developed by P. Syachentov. The latter was superior, but only experimental models existed. Therefore, the first 10 pre-production T-26s, which had a design identical to the Vickers 6-Ton, were equipped with a Hotchkiss gun in the right turret to increase firepower compared to the machine gun armed Vickers tank. The experimental PS-2 gun was mounted on only three T-26 tanks, the right turrets of which were replaced with small gun turrets from the T-35-1 (prototype of the T-35 heavy tank).

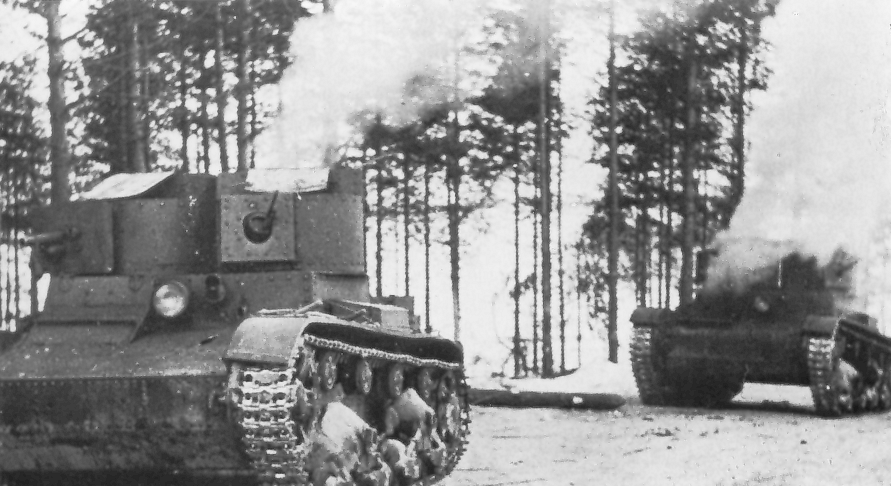
Twin-turreted T-26 mod. 1931 with riveted hull and turrets, armed with the 37 mm Hotchkiss gun (PS-1) in the right turret. Battle of Tolvajärvi. December 1939.

As the series production of the PS-2 gun was delayed, the Main Artillery Agency of the RKKA gave preference to a new gun. It was developed by the Artillery Design Office of the Bolshevik Factory, constructed from parts taken from the previously purchased German 37 mm anti-tank gun developed by Rheinmetall and the PS-2 gun. This system was successfully tested and the Artillery Factory No. 8 named after M. Kalinin started its series production under the designator B-3 (5K). The B-3 gun had less recoil and a smaller breech compared to the PS-2, so it could be easily mounted in the normal machine gun turret of the T-26. The first twin-turreted T-26 was armed with a B-3 gun in the right turret in late 1931. Unfortunately, series production of the B-3 gun proceeded slowly due to poor production standards (none of 225 guns produced in 1931 were accepted by army representatives; it took until 1933 to complete the original order for 300 guns placed in August 1931). Completed B-3 guns were mounted on BT-2 light tanks after mid-1932. This meant that twin-turreted T-26 tanks continued to be equipped with old 37 mm Hotchkiss (PS-1) guns. As production of the PS-1 gun had ended, some guns were taken from military supply depots and scrapped MS-1(T-18) tanks.

The initial plan was to arm every fifth T-26 with the 37 mm gun in the right turret, but the final proportion was somewhat higher. About 450 twin-turreted T-26 mod. 1931 tanks mounting the 37 mm gun in the right turret were produced in 1931–1933 (including only 20–30 tanks with the B-3 gun). There were 392 T-26 mod. 1931 tanks with gun plus machine gun armament in the Red Army on 1 April 1933.

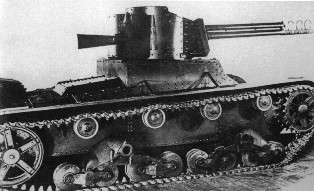
Twin-turreted T-26 armed with the 76.2 mm recoilless gun designed by L.V. Kurchevsky in the right turret. 1934.

- T-26 (BPK) (BPK stands for batal'onnaya pushka Kurchevskogo or "battalion gun by Kurchevsky"): twin-turreted version with a 76.2 mm recoilless gun (or "dynamic reaction gun", as it was called at the time) in the right turret. At the end of 1933 M. Tukhachevsky suggested equipping some T-26 mod. 1931 tanks with the 76.2 mm BPK recoilless gun designed by L.V. Kurchevsky in a right turret to increase firepower. One prototype tank was built in 1934. BPK had a muzzle velocity of 500 m/s (1,640 ft/s) and a range of 4 km (2.5 mi). The tank was able to carry 62 4-kg rounds. The test performed on 9 March 1934 demonstrated a significant increase in firepower, but the recoilless gun proved difficult to reload on the move, and the powerful blast projected behind the weapon when fired was dangerous to infantrymen behind the tank. Shortcomings were also observed in the design of the gun itself, and so the planned rearmament of twin-turreted T-26 tanks with recoilless guns did not take place.

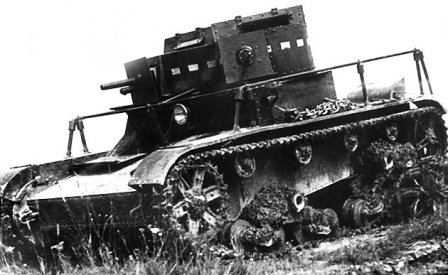
Twin-turreted T-26 (with the 37 mm Hotchkiss gun (PS-1) in the right turret), equipped with the radio station No. 7N and the hand-rail frame antenna on the hull. Military exercises. 1934.

- T-26TU (TU stands for tank upravleniya or "command tank"): twin-turreted version with a simplex radio station No. 7N (communication range: 10 km) and a hand-rail frame antenna on the hull. The antenna lead was located in the front part of the underturret box roof between the turrets. The vehicle was intended for platoon (and higher) commanders. Three such tanks were successfully tested in September 1932 and seven more radio stations were delivered to the Factory No. 174, but it is unknown whether they were ever mounted on twin-turreted T-26 tanks. Series production of twin-turreted command radio tanks was scheduled to begin on 1 January 1933, but this did not occur because radio stations No. 7N were in short supply and because of the introduction of single-turreted T-26s with series-produced 71-TK-1 radio stations.

One twin-turreted T-26 was given to the Research Institute of Communication in March 1932 to develop special tank communication devices. The plan was to equip each tank with a keyphone, while a platoon commander's tank would be equipped with a telephone switch for 6 subscribers (four for the tanks in the platoon, one for communication with infantry and one for contacting headquarters). A special terminal block was mounted on the rear of the tank so that communication wires could be connected. The work remained experimental.

=== Single-turreted tanks ===
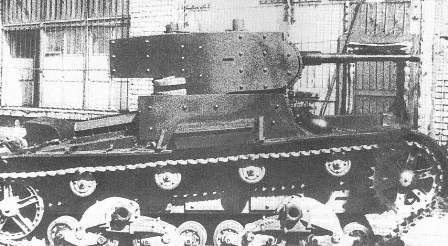
T-26 mod. 1933 with appliqué armour after running trials in early 1940

- T-26 model 1933: single turret version armed with 45 mm 20K tank gun and DT tank machine gun. This version had a new cylindrical turret with a large rear niche. Some tanks were equipped with a 71-TK-1 radio station with a hand-rail antenna around the turret (so-called radio tanks). They were upgraded in 1935 with a welded hull and turret, and again in 1936 with a rear DT tank machine gun in the turret. In 1937, some tanks were equipped with an anti-aircraft machine gun and a searchlight. The model 1933 was the most numerous variant.
- T-26 model 1938: new conical turret, small changes in hull parts, increased volume of fuel tanks. Tank gun mod. 1937 and mod. 1938 were equipped with an electric breechblock and a vertically stabilized TOP-1 telescopic sight (or a TOS telescopic sight on the 1938 model).
- T-26 model 1939 (T-26-1): underturret box with sloped armoured plates, rear machine gun removed on some tanks, 97 hp engine. Tanks built after 1940 were equipped with an underturret box made from 20 mm homogeneous armour, a unified observation device, and a new turret ring. Some tanks were equipped with armoured screens. About 1,975 T-26 tanks with a conical turret (T-26 mod. 1938, T-26 mod. 1939) were produced.
- T-26 screened: tank with additional armour plating (appliqué armour). Some modern sources mention this tank as T-26E (E stands for ekranirovanny or "screened"). The Factory No. 174 developed the design of 30–40 mm appliqué armour for all types of single-turreted T-26s during the Winter War. On 30 December 1939, factory tests proved that the T-26 with appliqué armour successfully resisted fire from a 45 mm anti-tank gun at a range from 400 to 500 m. Side and front armoured plates were mounted with the use of blunt bolts and electric welding. Toward the middle of February 1940, the RKKA received 27 screened T-26 mod. 1939 tanks and 27 KhT-133 flame-throwing tanks; an additional 15 T-26 mod. 1939 tanks were armoured by workshops of the 8th Army in Suoyarvi in the beginning of March 1940. All in all, 69 T-26s with appliqué armour were used during the Winter War and 20 more were delivered to tank units after the end of the war. Combat use proved that Finnish light anti-tank guns could not penetrate the armour of these tanks.

The T-26 mod. 1939 with appliqué armour weighed 12 tonnes (13 short tons), which caused an overload of the chassis, transmission, and engine of the light tank. Drivers were advised to use low gears only.

During World War II, a mounting of 15–40 mm appliqué armour on about a hundred different T-26s was performed by local factories in Leningrad in 1941–1942, during the Siege of Odessa (1941), the Battle for Moscow and the Siege of Sevastopol (1941–1942). A cutting of armoured plates was more rough than developed during the Winter War; the majority of these modified tanks did not have a moving armoured gun mask as seen in Factory No. 174's original design, and some tanks had front appliqué armour only.

==== Artillery tanks ====
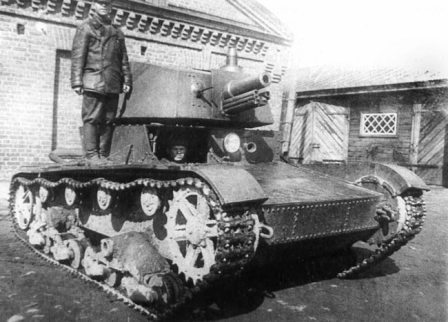
T-26 mod. 1931 with the A-43 welded turret developed by N. Dyrenkov. The ball mount for the DT tank machine gun is visible. Leningrad, 1933.

- T-26 with the A-43 turret: artillery T-26 or "tank of fire support" with a turret developed by self-taught inventor N. Dyrenkov at the Experimental Design Office of the Department of Mechanization and Motorization of the RKKA (UMM RKKA). Two types of turrets, armed with the 76 mm regimental gun mod. 1927 and DT tank machine gun in a ball mount, were assembled by the Izhora Factory. They were partially pressed and welded. The first variety was installed on the T-26 mod. 1931 in February 1932 and the second type was used in November 1932 (in the last case, the rear armoured plate of underturret box was made sloping).

It was found that the A-43 turret was very tight for two crewmembers; it had insufficient observation field; there was no turret ventilation, which made continuous gunfire difficult; and it was hard to rotate the turret manually. At the beginning of 1933, a new 76 mm KT tank gun mod. 1927/32 with reduced (from 900 mm to 500 mm) recoil length was installed into the A-43 turret. The turret was still a very tight place for crew members. The ammunition stowage for 54 rounds was unsuccessful, and the military refused the A-43 turret.

- T-26-4: artillery tank with enlarged turret armed with the 76.2 mm KT tank gun mod. 1927/32 (some modern sources mention this tank as T-26A, A stands for artilleriysky or "artillery"). The turret was developed by the Bolshevik Factory (since February 1932—by the Design Office of the established Factory No. 174) in 1931–1932; it was installed on the T-26 mod. 1931 in November 1932. Unlike the A-43 turret, the turret by Factory No. 174 was much more convenient for the crew. The turret of the T-26-4 was quite similar to main turret of the T-28 medium tank.

The T-26-4 with the KT tank gun passed tests successfully and five vehicles were built in 1933–1934 as pilot batch. Initially it was planned to arm three of these T-26-4 with the 76.2 mm KT tank gun mod. 1927/32 and the other two tanks with the 76.2 mm PS-3 tank gun. The PS-3 tank gun was developed at the Experimental Engineering-Mechanical Department (OKMO) of the Factory No. 174 by engineer P. Syachentov. The PS-3 had better specifications in comparison with the series-produced KT tank gun and also had several technical innovations (foot firing switch, original training gear, travelling position fixing, binocular optical sight). The T-26-4 armed with the PS-3 tank gun was tested in October 1933 but it was found that the PS-3 was too powerful for the T-26 light tank—turret's race ring and hull roof were deformed during gun fire, and the suspension springs were damaged. It was decided to arm the T-26-4 with the 76.2 mm KT tank gun only. All five experimental T-26-4 artillery tanks were tested during military exercises near Leningrad in September 1934 before scheduled series production of 50 such vehicles in 1935. But on 19 September 1934 an incident with a T-26-4 took place: a blow-back because of shell case destruction during gun fire. Despite the fact that this defect was unrelated to turret design, the military representatives cancelled the order to produce the T-26-4. Also the work to design turretless AT-1 artillery tanks armed with the powerful 76.2 mm PS-3 tank gun started at that time. The T-26-4's turret construction was the design used in the series-produced BT-7 (Artillery) tank.

In 1939, the Armoured Directorate of the Red Army (ABTU RKKA) ordered the development of a new conical turret for the T-26 similar to the BT-7's turret and to arm it with the 76.2 mm L-10 tank gun. Engineers of the Factory No. 174 felt it was impossible to implement this project because it would lead to a significant overload of T-26's chassis.

=== Armoured combat vehicles ===
A large variety of different armoured combat vehicles were developed on the T-26 chassis in the 1930s. Among them were KhT-26, KhT-130 and KhT-133 flame-throwing (chemical) tanks (552, 401 and 269 vehicles were produced, respectively); T-26T artillery tractors (197 were produced); TT-26 and TU-26 remotely controlled tanks (162 teletanks of all models were produced); ST-26 bridge-laying tanks (71 were produced); SU-5 self-propelled guns (33 were produced); experimental armoured cargo/personnel carriers, reconnaissance vehicles, and many others. The majority of these vehicles were developed at the Leningrad Factory of Experimental Mechanical Engineering (from 1935 known as the Factory No. 185 named after S.M. Kirov) by talented Soviet engineers P.N. Syachentov, S.A. Ginzburg, L.S. Troyanov, N.V. Tseits, B.A. Andryhevich, M.P. Zigel and others. Various vehicle-mounted equipment was developed for the T-26, including mine-clearing attachments, inflatable pontoons and a snorkel system for fording water obstacles, devices for overcoming obstacles and many others. T-26 light tanks were also modified into different armoured combat vehicles in the field during wartime.

=== Foreign variants ===
- Nazi Germany

- 7.5 cm Pak 97/38(f) auf Pz.740(r): Ten Pak 97/38 anti-tank guns with shields were experimentally mounted on captured Soviet T-26 light tank chassis, resulting in vehicles designated 7.5 cm Pak 97/38(f) auf Pz.740(r). These self-propelled guns served with the 3rd Company of the 563rd Anti-Tank Battalion before being replaced by Marder III on 1 March 1944.

- Finland

- T-26K K=Koulutus (Instruction): Finnish variant used for driver training. Similar to the T-26T artillery tractor, but with more boxy superstructure. 5 built from captured T-26s from 1947 to 1952.
- T-26V V=Vetäjä (Towing): Finnish variant proposed for towing anti-tank guns. Similar to the T-26T artillery tractor. 3 prototypes converted from captured T-26s in 1944.
- T-26Sh: Finnish rearmament of captured KhT-133 and KhT-130 Flamethrower Tanks with the 45mm 20-K gun and an additional DT machine gun mounted in the hull. At least one tank of this type is preserved (based on a Kht-133).

- (Kingdom of Romania) Romania

- T-26/37: Romanian proposal to rearm captured T-26s with 37 mm Škoda guns and 7.92 mm ZB machine guns.
- Vânătorul de care R35: Romanian tank destroyer based on the Renault R35, using the T-26's 45 mm 20-K gun. The first prototype even used the turret of a captured T-26.

== Survivors ==
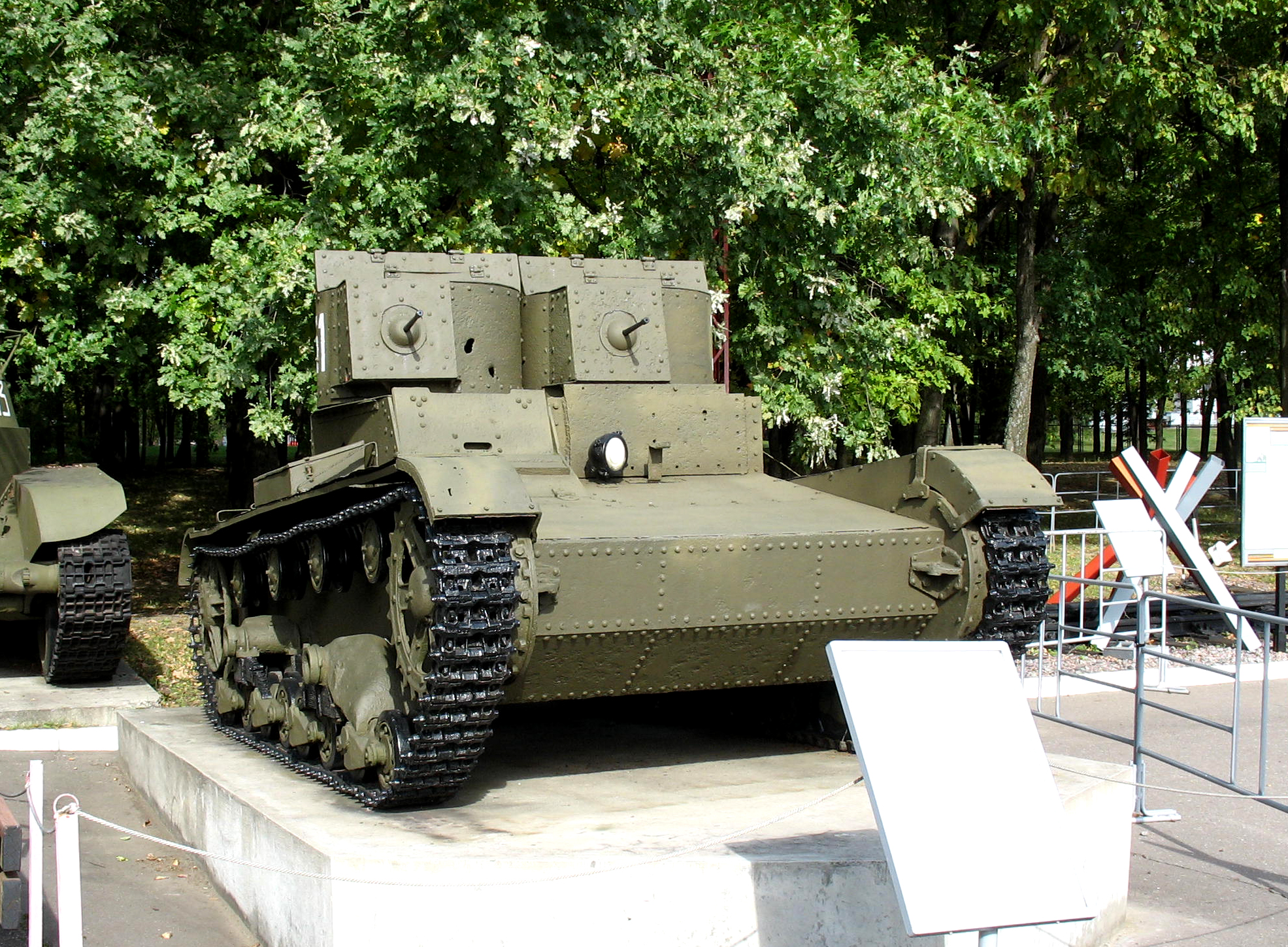
T-26 mod. 1931 with riveted hull and turrets. Central Museum of the Great Patriotic War in Moscow, Russia. 2008.

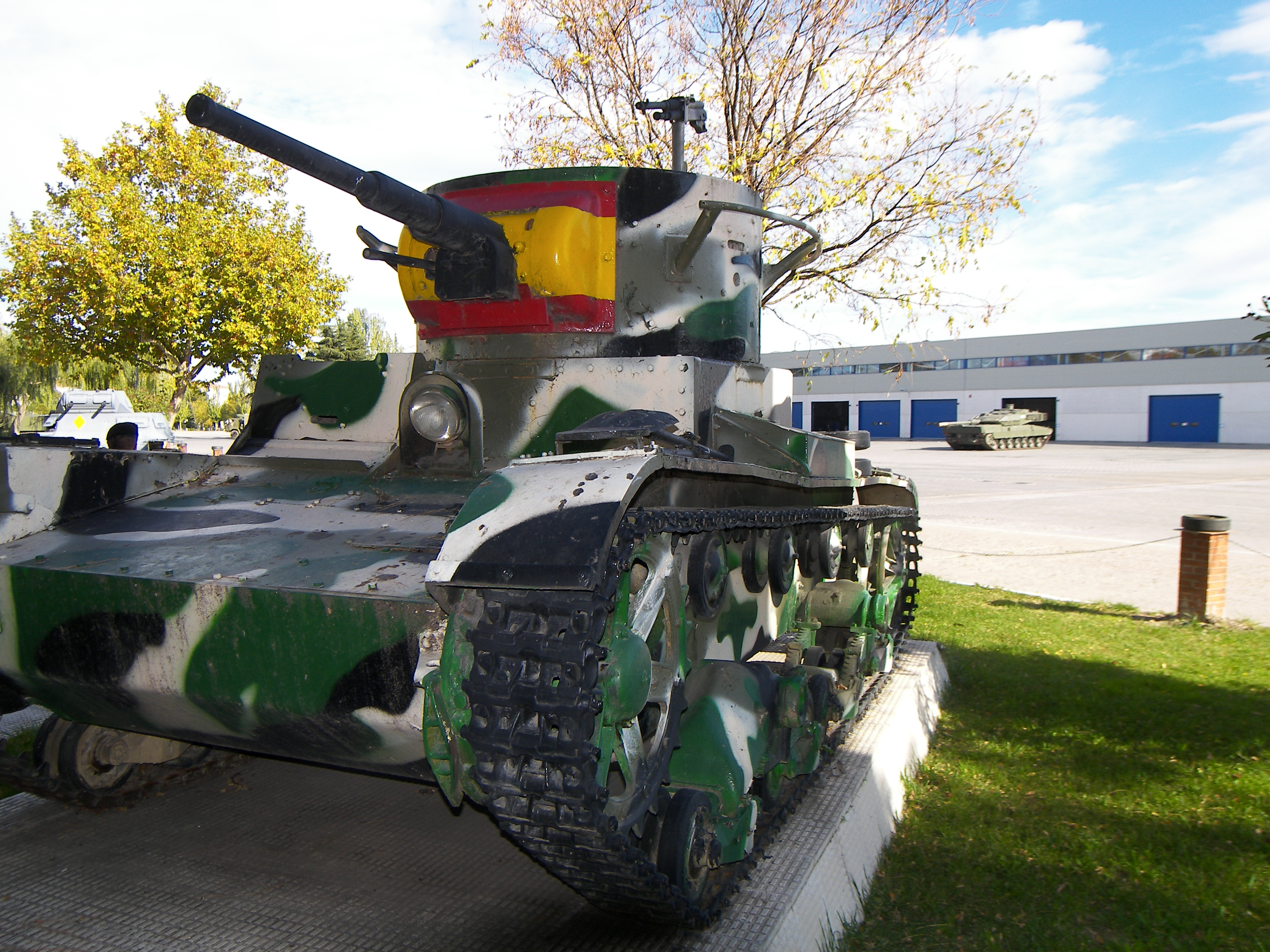
T-26 mod. 1933. El Goloso Museum in Madrid, Spain. 2007.

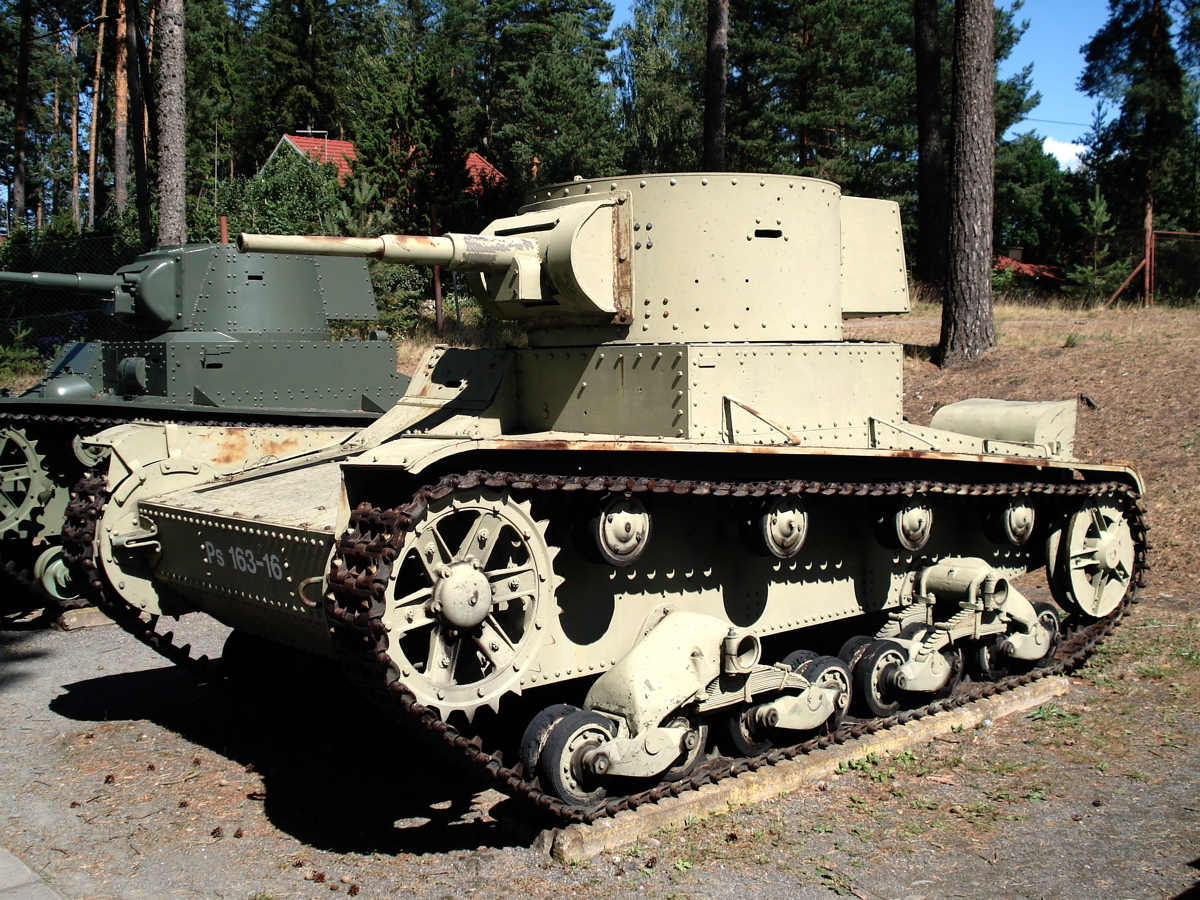
Modified KhT-26 with early BT-5 turret, often incorrectly labeled as "T-26 mod. 1933". Parola Tank Museum, Finland. 2006.

There are about 45 T-26 tanks of various models preserved in different museums and military schools (mainly Russian, Spanish, Turkish and Finnish). The most notable of them are:

- Twin-turreted T-26 mod. 1931 in the Central Museum of the Great Patriotic War in Moscow (Russia): this tank from the 115th Rifle Division with shell holes was raised from a river bottom on the site of river crossing at Nevsky Pyatachok in July 1989 by Katran diving club. The vehicle was restored at the Pärnu Training Tank Regiment of the Leningrad Military District. It was donated to the museum in February 1998. Only two such vehicles are preserved at the present time.
- Twin-turreted T-26 mod. 1931 with gun plus machine gun armament and riveted hull in the Kubinka Tank Museum in Moscow Oblast (Russia). The single surviving twin-turreted T-26 armed with the 37 mm gun.
- T-26 mod. 1933 in the Central Armed Forces Museum in Moscow (Russia): this late production variant was transferred from Kubinka Tank Museum in the 1980s.
- T-26 mod. 1933 in the museum-diorama "Breaching of the Leningrad Blockade" in Mar'ino village near Kirovsk, Leningrad Oblast (Russia): this tank was raised from a river bottom at Nevsky Pyatachok in May 2003, without its turret and with a large shell hole on the right side of the hull. It is now displayed with a turret, but the shell hole in the hull is still present.
- T-26 mod. 1933 in the Museum of the Northwestern Front in Staraya Russa, Novgorod Oblast (Russia): this tank was raised from the Lovat River in 1981 and became a monument to Soviet tankers in Korovitchino village (Novgorod Oblast). The vehicle was given to the museum in May 2004. The tank has inauthentic tracks.
- T-26 mod. 1933 in the El Goloso Barracks Museum in Madrid (Spain): the tank (Spanish tactical number 135) with Nationalist Spanish markings with pressed gun mask is armed with a Hotchkiss machine gun instead of a DT tank machine gun. Produced in 1936. The anti-aircraft machine gun and the hand-rail radio antenna are late dummies.
- T-26 mod. 1933 in the Museo Histórico Militar de Cartagena, Spain with Nationalist Spanish markings, in drivable condition.
- T-26 mod. 1933 in the Parola Tank Museum (Finland): Finnish tactical number Ps 163–33, in drivable condition.
- T-26 mod. 1933 in the Parola Tank Museum (Finland): this tank is described in many sources as early version of the T-26 mod. 1933. But in reality this is the Finnish war-time modernization (Finnish tactical number Ps 163–16) of a hull from KhT-26 flame-throwing tank (which can be identified by rivets for mounting of a burning mixture tank, rivets for hinges of a filling hatch on the left side and a welded drain port on the right side behind a front track bogie) with a mounted riveted turret with a small rear niche from the early BT-5 light tank.
- T-26 mod. 1933 in the Parola Tank Museum (Finland): the Finnish wartime modernization (Finnish tactical number Ps 163–28) of a hull from KhT-26 flame-throwing tank with a mounted turret from the BT-7 light tank.
- T-26 mod. 1933 in front of the Istanbul Military Museum (Turkey). One of the 64 T-26 Tanks that were purchased from Russia in 1934. The T-26 remained in service with the Turkish army until 1943.
- T-26 mod. 1939 in the Kubinka Tank Museum, Moscow Oblast (Russia): this tank with pressed turret front armoured plate is in drivable condition (the GAZ-41 engine from the BRDM-2 was installed in 2005). The tank has combat damage taken during the Great Patriotic War (many marks from armour-piercing bullets and a welded hole on the right side of the turret from a 50 mm shell).
- T-26 mod. 1939 in the Parola Tank Museum, (Finland): the Finnish war-time modernization (Finnish tactical number Ps 164–7); a hull from a KhT-133 flame-throwing tank with a mounted turret from the T-26 mod. 1938/1939 and a ball mount for the DT tank machine gun in a hull front armoured plate.
- KhT-130 flame-throwing tank in the Kubinka Tank Museum, Moscow Oblast (Russia): in reality this is the TU-26 teletank control vehicle with a dummy flame-thrower.
- KhT-130 flame-throwing tank in the Military Unit No. 05776 in Borzya, Chita Oblast (Russia): monument (since 1995) with an incomplete chassis (one track bogie is missing; tracks and driving wheels were taken from the M3 Stuart American light tank). Before 1990 the vehicle stood in the territory of one of military units of the Soviet 39th Army (located in Mongolia) of the Transbaikal Military District. The single preserved KhT-130 at the present time.
- T-26 Model 1933 in the Bovington tank museum, UK. T-26A vehicle. Recovered, converted into a T-26B and used by Finnish forces.

== Operators ==
- Nationalist China − Operated by the 200th Division
- Finland − Captured during the Winter War
- Nazi Germany − Captured Soviet vehicles
- Kingdom of Hungary − Captured Soviet vehicles
- Kingdom of Romania − Captured Soviet vehicles
- Soviet Union − Operated T-26s as late as August 1945
- Spanish Republic − approximately 300 tanks were supplied by the Soviet Union and used in the Spanish civil war
  - Spanish Nationalists − Limited use of captured Republican tanks in the Spanish civil war
- Turkey − 64 T-26 Mod. 1933s [1934-1943] (Two T-26 Mod. 1931s and T-27s were received in 1932).

== See also ==
- Combat history of the T-26
