= Nevsky Pyatachok =

Bridgehead for Soviet troops in the battle to lift the blockade of Leningrad

Coordinates: 59°50′37″N 30°57′12″E

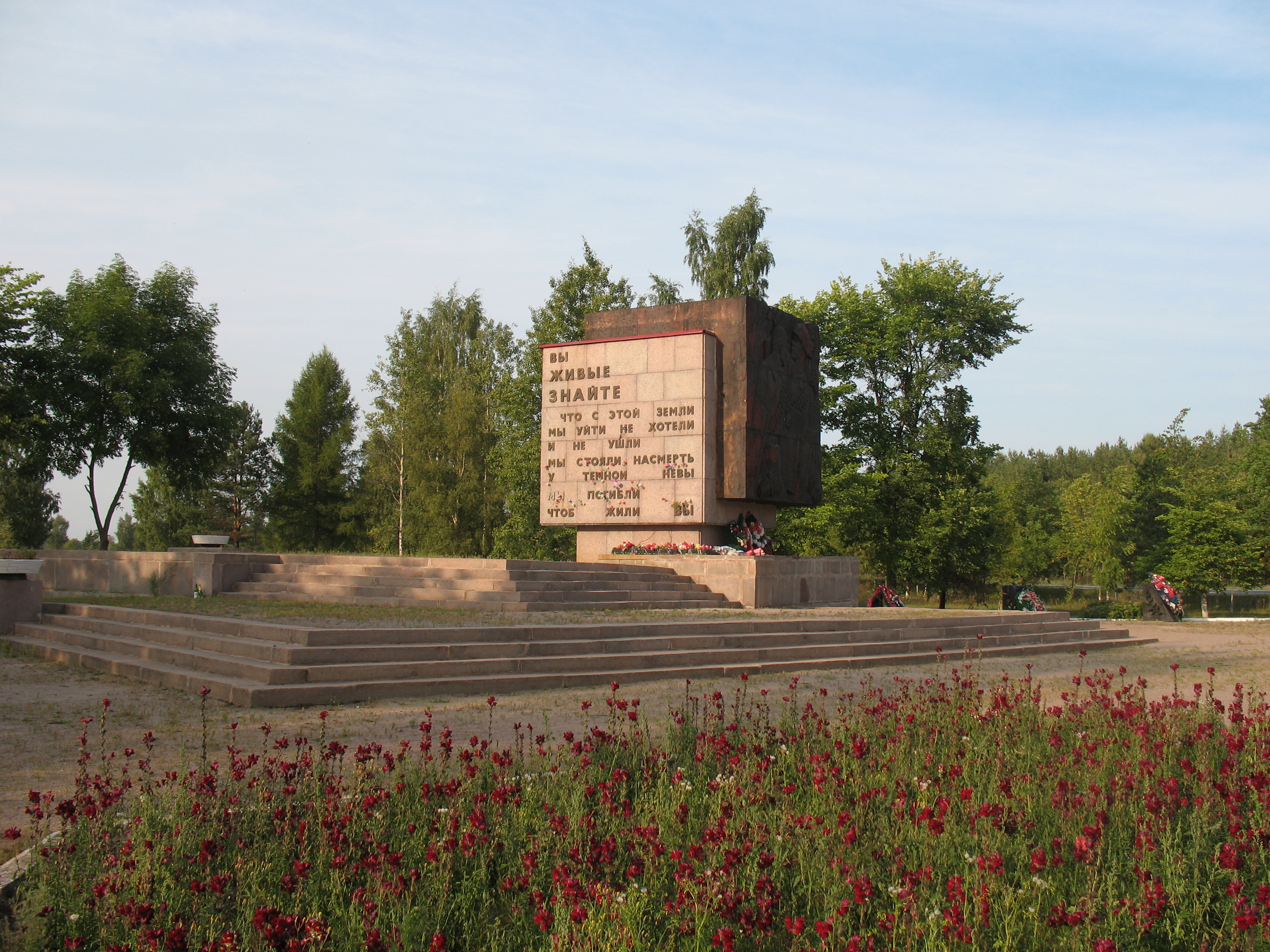
Memorial at the battlefield of Nevsky Pyatachok

Nevsky Pyatachok (Russian: Не́вский пятачо́к) is the name of the Neva Bridgehead 50 km east south-east of Leningrad and 15 km south of Shlisselburg. It was the site of one of the most critical and costly campaigns during the Siege of Leningrad from September 1941 until May 1943 to reopen land communications with the city during the German siege.

The Russian word pyatachok means a five-kopeck coin, or (by way of a metaphor) a very small area.

== Campaign for the land communications ==
The area between Shlisselburg and the bend of the Neva to the south represented the land link between the Soviet-controlled territory and the city defence perimeter. The Red Army objective was to retain this narrow stretch of the shore and prevent German forces from completing the blockade, thus allowing transports to reach the population in besieged Leningrad with food, medication and other supplies.

The area was first defended by the Red Army's Krasnogvardeisk Fortified Region, the 55th and the 48th Armies which included the 45th Guards, 115th, 86th, 168th, 10th Rifle Divisions, 1st NKVD Rifle Division and 4th Separate Naval Infantry Brigade. On 7 September 1941, the German 20th Motorised Division was able to force the elements of the 48th Army out of Shlisselburg, setting the stage for a more than two-year struggle by the Red Army to reopen land communications with Leningrad.

Initially, the Germans secured the area. On 20 September 1941 a small group of Soviet soldiers under Captain Vasily Dubik managed to cross the river using fishing boats and homemade rafts and establish the bridgehead, but they failed to enlarge it. The Germans managed to eliminate the bridgehead by 29 April 1942 but it was re-established on 26 September 1942.

In October 1942 the Soviet 67th Army began attempting to dislodge the German XXVIII Army Corps. Fighting was heavy.

Eventually, Leonid Govorov proposed two operations to the Stavka, called the Shlisselburg Operation and the Uritsk Operation, which became the basis of the planning for Operation Iskra. The 2nd Shock Army of the Volkhov Front and the 67th Army of the Leningrad Front were to destroy the German troops in the Shlisselburg – Siniavino sector, thereby restoring land communications and raising the siege. They were supported in this by the 13th Air Army and some units of the Long Range Aviation.

Although the south-eastern perimeter of the siege was temporarily penetrated, Soviet forces only managed to open a 10–12 km wide corridor, meaning all traffic passed under the fire of German guns. German casualties for the duration of the struggle for the bridgehead, estimated to be 1 km by 1.5 km in area, were some 160,000 (combat and combat-related).

These, and other operations conducted until 10 May 1943, resulted in Red Army casualties estimated at 260,000 in this sector of the front.

== After World War II ==
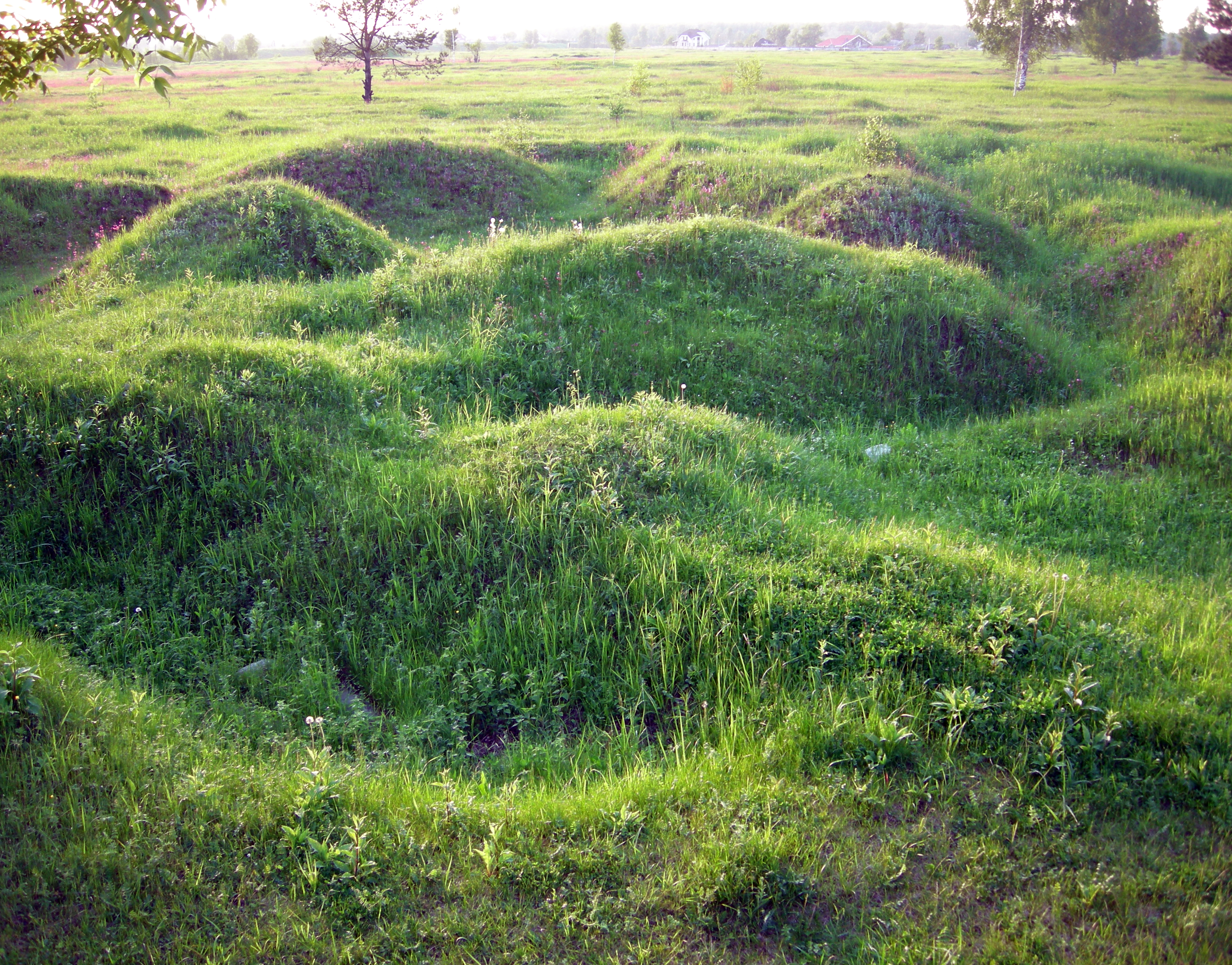
Remnants of World War II Soviet trenches in the Nevsky Pyatachok.

After the war, a tradition began in which the children of Leningrad schools took summer trips to the area to search for the remains of the many who died there. Official burial ceremonies were then held commemorating the dead whose remains were recovered. The terrain still contains unidentifiable skeletal remains.

== National memorial ==
Today, the battlefield of Nevsky Pyatachok is a well-known national and historic landmark in Russia. A memorial was built as part of the "Green Belt of Glory" commemorating the heroic resistance during the siege of Leningrad.

The words on the memorial belong to Robert Rozhdestvensky and can be literally translated as:

"You,

Those who are alive,

Should know

That this land

We didn't want to leave

And never left.

We were fighting to the bitter end

By the dark Neva.

We have perished

For you to live."

== Sources ==
- The siege of Leningrad. By Alan Wykes. Ballantines Illustrated History of WWII, 3rd edition, 1972.
- Military-Topographic Directorate, maps No. 194, 196, Officer's Atlas. General Staff USSR. 1947. Атлас Офицера. Генеральный штаб вооруженных сил ССР. М., Военно-топографическоее управление,- 1947. Листы 194, 196
- Glantz, David (2001). Leningrad, city under siege 1941–1944. Kent: Grange Books.
