= Teletank =

Series of Soviet remote-controlled tanks

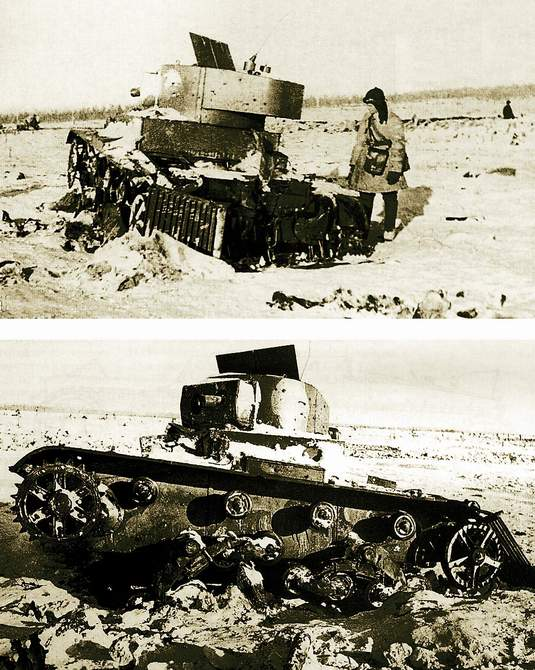
Shot-up TT-26, a remotely controlled T-26 light tank with TOZ-IV telematics, of 217th independent tank battalion of 30th Tank Brigade. Two antenna leads on the turret roof and two-colour camouflage of the vehicle are visible. Karelian Isthmus, February 1940.

Teletanks were a series of experimental wireless remotely controlled unmanned tanks produced in the Soviet Union in the 1930s and early 1940s so as to reduce combat risk to soldiers. A teletank is controlled by radio from a control tank at a distance of 500–1,500 metres (0.31–0.93 mi), the two constituting a telemechanical group.

While never in common use, the teletanks were used by the Soviet Red Army in the Winter War against Finland, with at least two teletank battalions at the beginning of the Eastern Front campaign in the Second World War.

== Design ==
Teletanks were equipped with DT machine guns, flamethrowers, smoke canisters, and sometimes a special 200–700 kg time bomb in an armoured box, dropped by the tank near the enemy's fortifications and used to destroy bunkers up to four levels below ground. Teletanks were also designed to be capable of using chemical weapons, although they were not used in combat. Each teletank, depending on model, was able to recognize sixteen to twenty-four different commands sent via radio on two possible frequencies to avoid interference and jamming. Teletanks were built based on T-18, T-26, T-38, BT-5 and BT-7 light tanks.

Standard tactics were for the TU control tank (with radio transmitter and operator) to stay back as far as practicable while the teletank (TT) approached the enemy. The control tank would provide fire support as well as protection for the radio control operator. If the enemy was successful at seizing the teletank, the control tank crew was instructed to destroy it with its main gun. When not in combat, the teletank was driven manually.

In addition to teletanks, there were also remotely controlled telecutters and teleplanes in the Red Army.

== See also ==
- Telerobotics
- Teleoperation
- Goliath tracked mine
- List of Russian inventions
