= T-50 tank =

Soviet light tank of World War II

T-50 light infantry tank
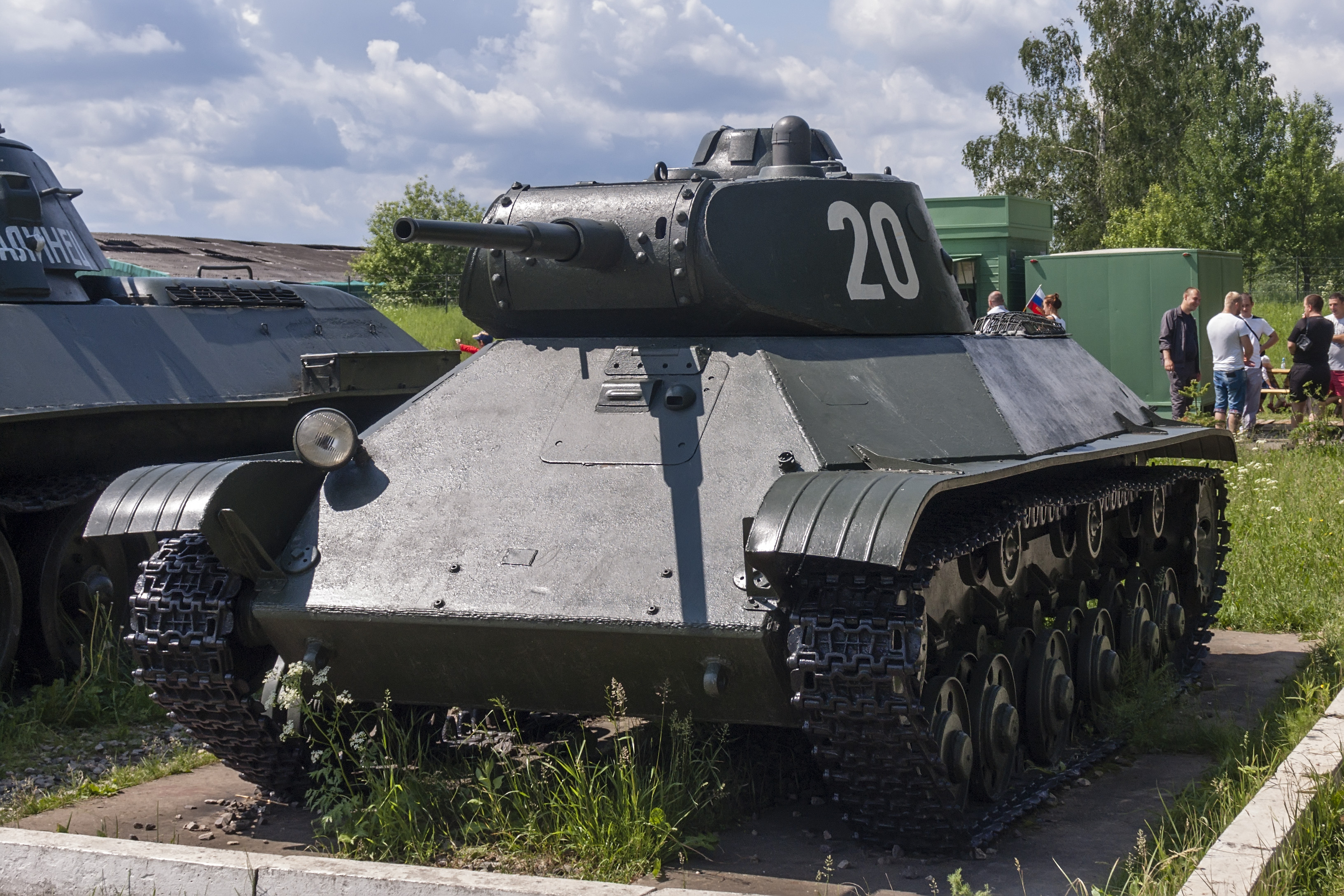
- T-50 "20" at the Kubinka Tank Museum
- Type: Light infantry tank
- Place of origin: Soviet Union

Service history
- In service: 1941-1945
- Used by: Soviet Union; Finland
- Wars: World War II

Production history
- Designer: S. Ginzburg, L. Troyanov, OKMO
- Designed: 1939–41
- Manufacturer: Factory 174, Leningrad/Chkalov
- Produced: 1941–42
- No. built: 69

Specifications
- Mass: 14 tonnes (14 long tons; 15 short tons)
- Length: 5.20 m (17 ft 1 in)
- Width: 2.47 m (8 ft 1 in)
- Height: 2.16 m (7 ft 1 in)
- Crew: 4
- Armor: 12–37 mm (0.47–1.46 in)
- Main armament: 45 mm Model 1932/38 20-K gun (150 rds.)
- Secondary armament: 7.62 mm DT machine gun
- Engine: diesel inline-six engine 300 hp (220 kW)
- Power/weight: 21 hp/tonne (16 kW/tonne)
- Suspension: torsion bar
- Fuel capacity: 350 L (77 imp gal; 92 US gal)
- Operational range: 220 km (140 mi)
- Maximum speed: 60 km/h (37 mph)

The T-50 was a light infantry tank built by the Soviet Union at the beginning of World War II. The design for this vehicle had some advanced features, but was complicated and expensive, and only a short production run of 69 tanks was completed.

== Production history ==
The T-50 was a light tank developed on the eve of World War II for the Red Army. The experience of the Spanish Civil War led to an effort to upgrade or replace the large Soviet tank fleet. Prior to 1939, most tanks in Red Army service were improved versions of foreign designs. For example, the most numerous tank, the T-26 light infantry tank, was a copy of the British Vickers 6-Ton tank with a Soviet-designed turret and 45 mm gun. However, just prior to and during the war, the USSR developed new light, medium and heavy tanks of wholly indigenous design. The T-50 light tank was intended to replace the T-26 infantry tank; in prewar planning, the T-50 was intended to become the most numerous Soviet tank, operating alongside the BT fast tank.

Development of the T-50 started as the SP project (Soprovzhdeniya Pekhoty, 'Infantry Support') in 1939 at the OKMO design bureau in the S.M. Kirov Factory Number 185 in Leningrad, under the direction of, and headed by, L. Troyanov and I. Bushnevov, to create a light tank replacement for the T-26 and BT tanks. Initial prototypes, called T-126 and T-127, were not much improved over the T-46-5 project which had been abandoned earlier that year, but the heavier T-126 was selected for further development. The design bureau was gutted during the Great Purge, and was unable to continue the project, so it was transferred to the K.E. Voroshilov Factory Number 174 in Leningrad, May 1940, where two prototypes from the Voroshilovsky and Kirovsky factories were tested. The first 2 vehicles were finished at Factory No. 174 in Leningrad in late 1940. Troyanov completed the T-50 design in January 1941. After a few modifications it was ready for delivery in April 1941. Production was then authorized, but due to technical problems, it was unable to proceed. The chassis was supposed to be based on the T-40, however, the suspension operated differently.

In the meantime, a replacement for the BT fast tanks was developed and built at the Malyshev Factory (KhPZ) in Ukraine, which exceeded its original programme. The result was the very capable and economical T-34 medium tank.

After the German invasion, Operation Barbarossa in June, tank factories were ordered to be transferred to the Urals. Part of OKMO was moved to Chkalov after September. The T-50 was of an excellent design, but still suffered from technical problems, and at that time was found to be as expensive to produce as the more capable T-34. Much simpler T-60 light tanks were already being mass-produced. A total of 69 T-50 tanks were built (only 48 of them armed), before production ended in January 1942.

Some further infantry tank design work on a prototype, called the T-45, continued at Factory Number 174 and the Kirovskiy Factory Number 100. But faced with the need to accelerate T-34 production, and due to a lack of interest from troops in the field, the Soviet infantry tank concept was abandoned.

=== Description ===
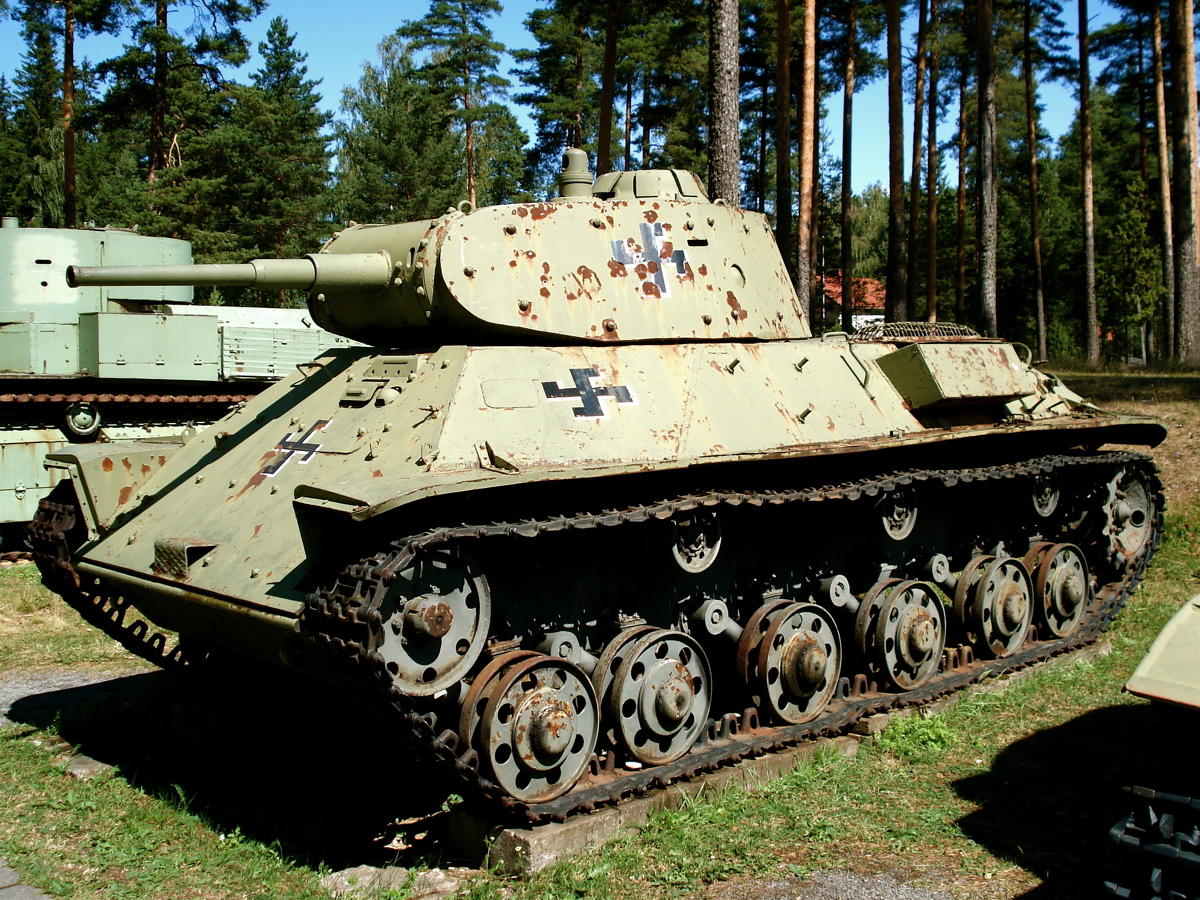
T-50 with Finnish markings

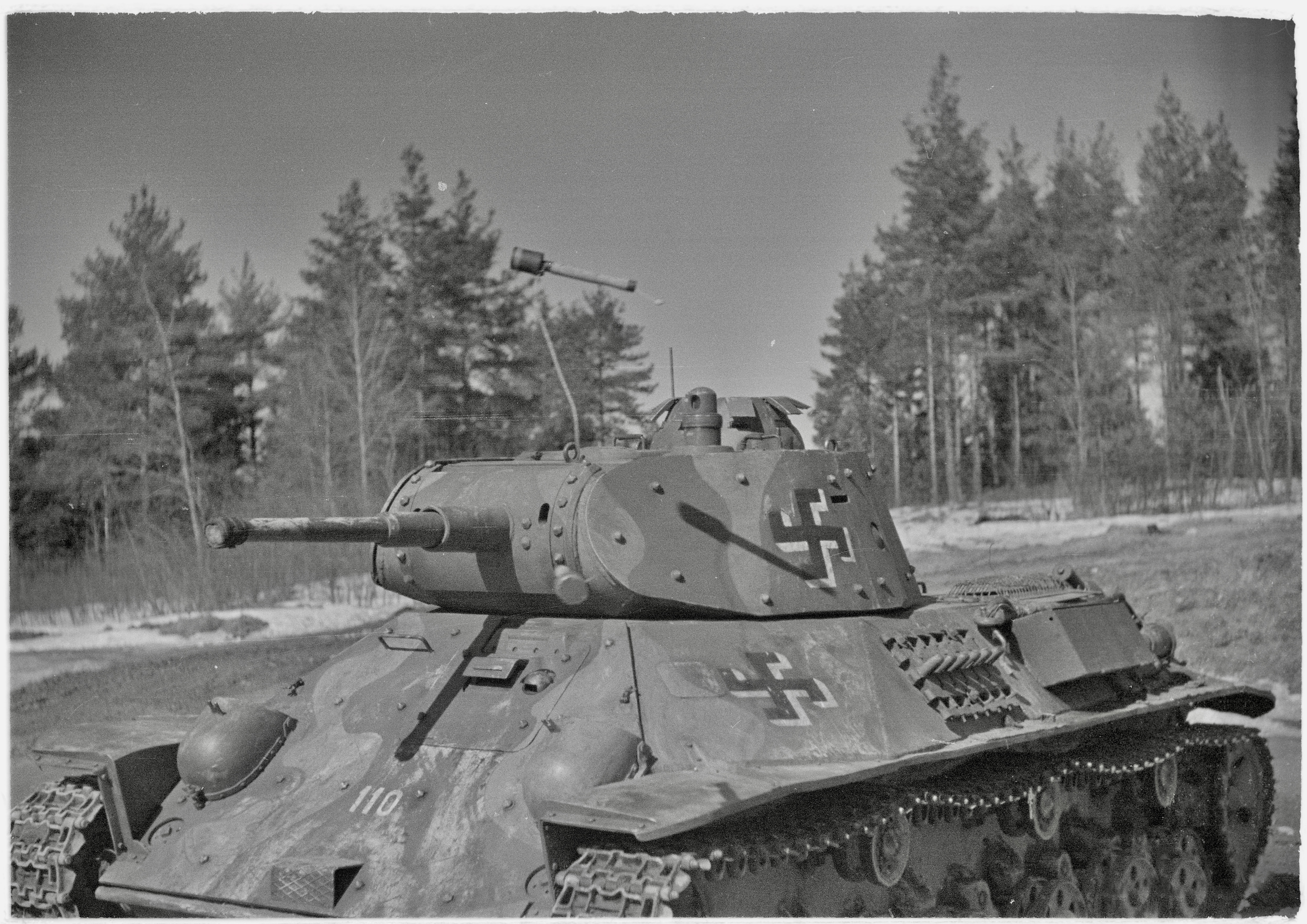
T-50 in Finnish service, 1944

The T-50 was an advanced design for its time, with torsion-bar suspension, diesel engine (in common with all the new Soviet tanks) and well-sloped, all-welded armor. A notable feature was the commander's cupola. This would not appear on other Soviet tanks until 1942, which instead relied on panoramic periscopes. A break from previous Soviet light tanks, it featured a three-man turret as was the case on medium and heavy tanks such as the T-28, T-35 and KV-1. Additionally, all T-50s had radios, a feature only found on the commander's vehicle of earlier light tanks.

However, the T-50 had problems with its power-plant the new inline-six diesel engine developed specifically for this tank, unlike other Soviet light AFVs, which used standard truck engines. The T-60 and T-70 light tanks and the SU-76 self-propelled gun used standard GAZ truck engines. Specialized tank engines, being more expensive to produce, were reserved for higher-performance vehicles. The very mobile BT-7 fast tank, the T-34 medium tank, KV-1 Kliment Voroshilov tanks, the IS-2 heavy tanks, and their derivatives all used variants of the same standard 12-cylinder model V-2 diesel engine. The V-4 engine was extremely unreliable, and the design flaws could not be worked out. The engine's low reliability and high cost contributed to the demise of the T-50.

=== Variants ===
There were two variants; a basic model and an up-armored model. Just prior to the German invasion of the USSR, many Soviet tanks had their armor reinforced with welded or bolted add-on plates. Some Kliment Voroshilov heavy tanks, T-28 medium tanks and T-26 light tanks received add-on armor fittings. A few T-50s also received these add-ons. This up-armored variant is recognizable by the bolt heads that hold the armor added to the turret sides and hull front. The normal T-50 is a very 'clean' looking vehicle by comparison. The uparmored T-50 had 57 mm of armor at its thickest points.

== Combat history ==
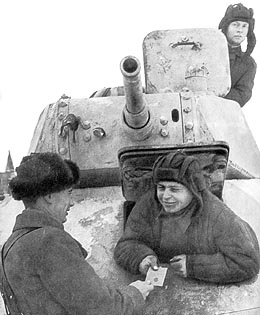
Soviet tankmen with their T-50

The few T-50s available were deployed on the Leningrad front. Few in-service photos survived and not much is known of their combat record. One uparmored T-50 was captured by Finnish forces and was used by them in 1944. This unit survived the war and is now on display at the Parola tank museum.

Most light tank production in 1941–43 consisted of the less advanced T-60 and T-70 light tanks. By 1943, the infantry tank role was considered obsolete, and cheaper SU-76 self-propelled guns took over the light infantry support role. Light tanks in tank regiments were being replaced by T-34 medium tanks. The liaison and reconnaissance roles of light tanks were assumed by cheaper armoured cars.

27 T-50 tanks, both from Leningrad and Chkalovsky factories, were included in the 488th separate tank battalion deployed to the Transcaucasian Front. In October 1942 - January 1943, the battalion actively participated in battles in the Northern Caucasus. By February 1, 1943, the battalion did not have any working tanks and soon departed for reorganization.

== Variants ==
- T-50-2 - a prototype of the Kirov plant differed from the model of Factory Plant No. 174 with changed shape of the hull. One tank was built and took part in the battles near Leningrad.
- T-126(SP) - an early version of the T-50 tank with thicker armor. Two vehicles were built with armor thickness of 45 and 37 mm.

== Surviving units ==
Today, at least two T-50s survive. One is at the Finnish tank museum at Parola. This is a later model with bolted-on appliqué armour. Maxim Kolomyets has written in his book on T-50 (T-50. Luchshiy legkiy tank Velikoy Otechestvennoy) that this additional armour was added by Finnish repair workshop.

A standard T-50 is on display at the Kubinka Tank Museum outside Moscow along with the T-126(SP) variant.

== Sources ==
- Zaloga, Steven J.; James Grandsen (1984). Soviet Tanks and Combat Vehicles of World War Two. London: Arms and Armour Press. ISBN 0-85368-606-8.
