= T-80 light tank =

1945 Soviet light tank

T-80
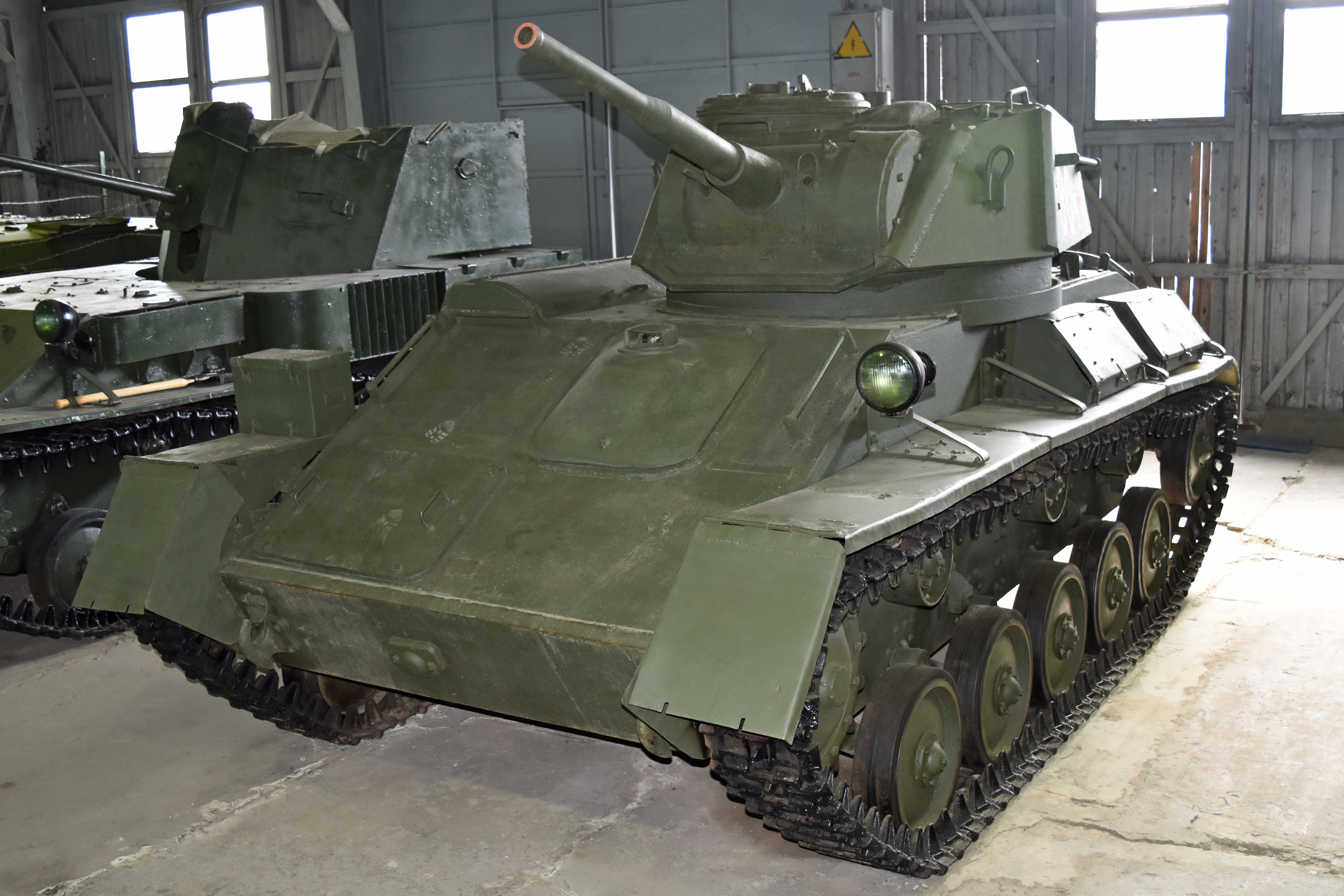
- T-80 light tank displayed at the Kubinka Tank Museum.
- Type: Light tank
- Place of origin: Soviet Union

Service history
- In service: 1945
- Used by: Soviet Union
- Wars: World War II (limited service)

Production history
- Designer: Gorky Automobile Plant (GAZ)
- Designed: 1943–1944
- Produced: 1945
- No. built: ~85

Specifications
- Mass: 14.5 tonnes
- Length: 4.29m(14 ft 1 in)
- Width: 2.42m(7 ft 11 in)
- Height: 2.17m(7 ft 1 in)
- Crew: 3 (commander/gunner, loader, driver)
- Armor: Up to 45 mm
- Main armament: 45 mm 20K mod. 38 gun
- Secondary armament: 7.62 mm DT machine gun
- Engine: 2 × GAZ-203 gasoline engines 170 hp (combined)
- Suspension: Torsion bar
- Operational range: 300 km (186 mi)
- Maximum speed: 45 km/h (28 mph)

The T-80 was a Soviet light tank developed during the final phase of World War II. It was a further development of the T-70 light tank, addressing its main shortcomings, particularly the one-man turret. The T-80 featured a two-man turret, enhanced armor, and other minor improvements. Despite these changes, it entered production too late in the war to see widespread use and was quickly overshadowed by the increasing reliance on medium tanks like the T-34-85.

== Development ==
The T-80 was developed by the Gorky Automobile Plant (GAZ) in 1943–1944. Its design aimed to improve upon the limitations of the T-70, especially its overburdened commander, who also served as the gunner. The T-80 introduced a two-man turret configuration, which allowed one crew member to focus solely on gunnery while the commander could manage battlefield awareness and coordination.

In addition to the improved crew layout, the T-80 was equipped with thicker armor and minor mechanical upgrades. It retained the same 45 mm 20K gun used in the T-70, which was already considered underpowered by 1945 standards.

== Design ==
The T-80 was similar in layout to its predecessor but slightly larger. It had a crew of three: a driver, a commander/gunner, and a loader. The hull and turret were constructed from welded steel plates, offering maximum armor thickness of 45 mm.

== Production and service ==
Only about 85 units of the T-80 were manufactured in 1945. By this time, the Red Army was increasingly prioritizing the production of more heavily armed and armored medium tanks such as the T-34-85. As a result, the T-80 saw little to no combat use, and its production was quickly halted.

The vehicle was briefly used in training and testing roles before being phased out entirely. No known combat deployments were recorded.

== Legacy ==
The T-80 marked the end of the Soviet Union’s light tank development during World War II. While it featured some design improvements, it was functionally obsolete by the time it was fielded. The emphasis on heavier, more versatile medium tanks rendered further light tank production unnecessary for the Red Army's evolving tactics and strategic needs.

The designation was later reused for a main battle tank developed in 1976, although it was a completely different and unrelated design.

== See also ==
- T-60
- T-70
- T-34
- Soviet tanks of World War II
