= National Museum of Military History, Bulgaria =

National Military History Museum
- Национален военноисторически музей
- Established: 1916
- Location: Sofia, Bulgaria
- Coordinates: 42°41′18.23″N 23°21′2.56″E
- Website: militarymuseum.bg/en/

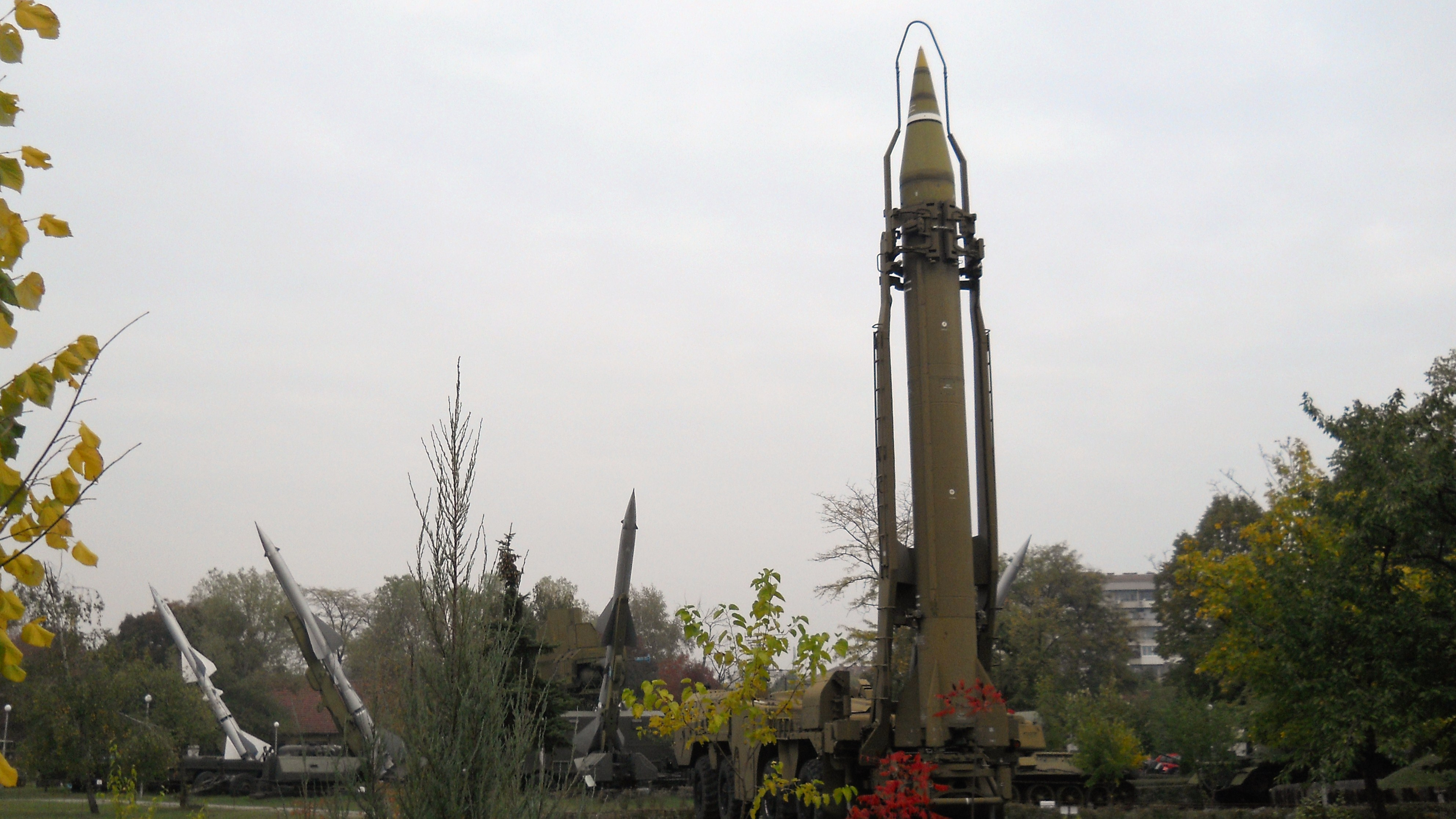
Different types of missiles on display

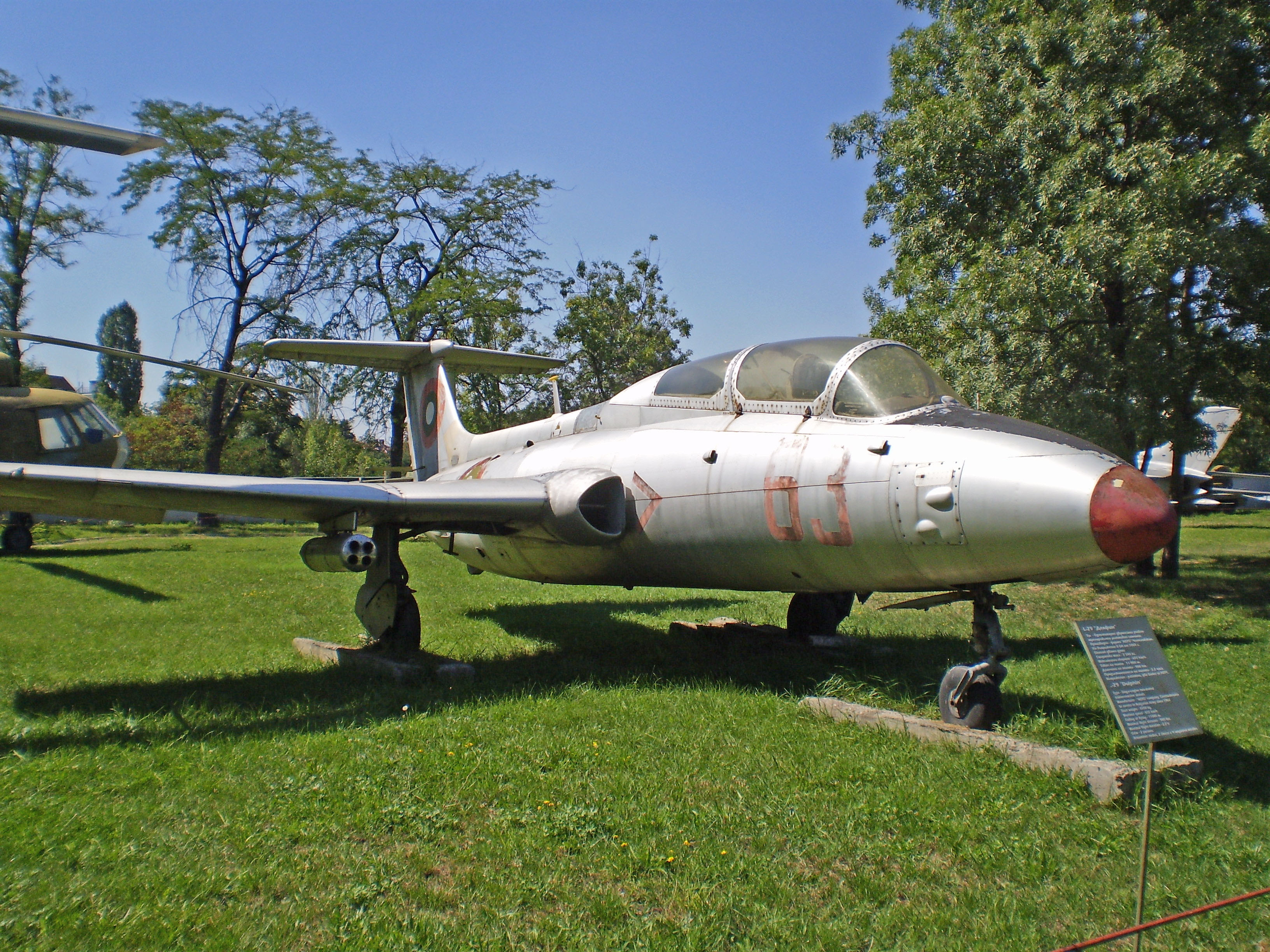
Aero L-29 on display

The National Museum of Military History (Bulgarian: Национален военноисторически музей) is a museum in Sofia, Bulgaria, dedicated to military history. Located just minutes from the city center, it features a vast 2.5-hectare outdoor exhibition park with over 280 units of heavy military equipment, including tanks, aircraft, and missile systems, alongside a rich indoor collection preserving weapons, uniforms, battle flags, rare documents, awards, and unique personal relics dating from Antiquity to the present day.

== History ==
The establishment of the museum began with Decree No. 39 of 1 August 1914 by Tsar Ferdinand I, which created a Military History Agency within the Bulgarian Army Headquarters. Shortly after, its structure was formally defined to include a museum, archives, and a library. On 4 July 1916, Order No. 391 of the Commander-in-Chief of the Active Army officially initiated the systematic collection of artifacts documenting Bulgaria's military history. The Military Museum thus became the third national museum institution in the country, following the split of the National Museum into the Archaeological and Ethnographic Museums in 1906.

The museum's first permanent public exhibition was opened on 12 May 1937 at 15 Moskovska Str. in Sofia, in a building leased from the Sofia Officers' Assembly. In 1949, the institution was renamed the Central People's Army Museum and relocated to 23 Gen. Skobelev Blvd., where a new exhibition opened in 1952.

During the second half of the 20th century, the institution expanded its scope and operations:

In 1956, the Naval Museum in Varna became a branch of the museum, and the first conservation and restoration workshop was established.

Following a 1967 intergovernmental agreement between Bulgaria and Hungary, the museum team created the Museum of the First Bulgarian Army in Hungary—the only Bulgarian military museum on foreign soil.

In 1968, a decree of the Council of Ministers granted the institution national status, officially renaming it the National Museum of Military History (NMMH). The Naval Museum and the Park-Museum of Military Friendship "Vladislav Varnenchik" in Varna were incorporated as its branches.

The museum also developed an academic publishing program, launching the scholarly journal ''Bulletin of the National Museum of Military History'' in 1973, followed by the ''Annual of the Naval Museum'' in 2001.

== Outdoor exhibition ==
An incomplete list of equipment on display.

=== Artillery ===
- (German Empire) 10.5 cm leFH 16
- (German Empire) 7.7 cm FK 96 n.A.
- (German Empire) 10 cm K 14
- (Russian Empire) 6-duim mortar
- (Russian Empire) M1876 8-duim mortar
- (Nazi Germany) 7.5 cm Pak 40
- (Nazi Germany) 10 cm schwere Kanone 18
- (Nazi Germany) 10.5 cm leFH 18
- (Nazi Germany) 15 cm sFH 18
- (Nazi Germany) Jagdpanzer IV
- (Nazi Germany) Sturmgeschütz III
- (Soviet Union) 76 mm divisional gun M1942 (ZiS-3)
- (Soviet Union) 100 mm field gun M1944 (BS-3)
- (Soviet Union) 122 mm gun M1931/37 (A-19)
- (Soviet Union) 152 mm howitzer M1943 (D-1)
- (Soviet Union) Katyusha rocket launcher
- (Soviet Union) SU-76
- (Soviet Union) SU-100
- (Soviet Union) 122 mm howitzer M1938 (M-30)
- (Soviet Union) 37 mm automatic air defense gun M1939 (61-K)
- (Soviet Union) ZU-23-2
- (Soviet Union) KS-19
- (Czechoslovakia) RM-51
- (Soviet Union) BM-21
- (Soviet Union) BM-24
- (Soviet Union) 2S3 Akatsiya
- (Belgium) FN 4RM

=== Missiles ===
- (Soviet Union) 9K52 Luna-M
- (Soviet Union) R-17 Elbrus
- (Soviet Union) OTR-23 Oka
- (Soviet Union) S-75 Dvina
- (Soviet Union) 2K11 Krug

=== Military vehicles ===
- (Soviet Union) AT-S artillery tractor
- (Soviet Union) BTM ditching machine
- (Soviet Union) MTU-12 bridge-layer
- (Soviet Union) TMM bridge-layer
- (Soviet Union) BTR-152
- (Soviet Union) BTR-60
- (Soviet Union) BTR-60PAU
- (Soviet Union) MT-LB
- (Soviet Union) MT-LBu
- (Soviet Union) ZIS-5 truck
- (Bulgaria) BMP-23
- (Bulgaria) BMP-30

=== Tanks ===
- (German Empire) Fahrpanzer
- (Czechoslovakia) LT-35
- (France) Hotchkiss H35
- (Nazi Germany) Panzer IV
- (Soviet Union) T-34-76
- (Soviet Union) T-34-85
- (Soviet Union) T-54/55
- (Soviet Union) T-72

=== Aircraft ===
- (Czechoslovakia) Aero L-29
- (Soviet Union) Mikoyan-Gurevich MiG-15
- (Soviet Union) Mikoyan-Gurevich MiG-17
- (Soviet Union) Mikoyan-Gurevich MiG-19
- (Soviet Union) Mikoyan-Gurevich MiG-21
- (Soviet Union) Mikoyan-Gurevich MiG-23
- (Germany) Panavia Tornado
- (Soviet Union) Mil Mi-2
- (Soviet Union) Mil Mi-8
- (Soviet Union) Mil Mi-24

=== Other ===
- Spasov M1944 Trigun
