= T-70 =

1942 Soviet light tank

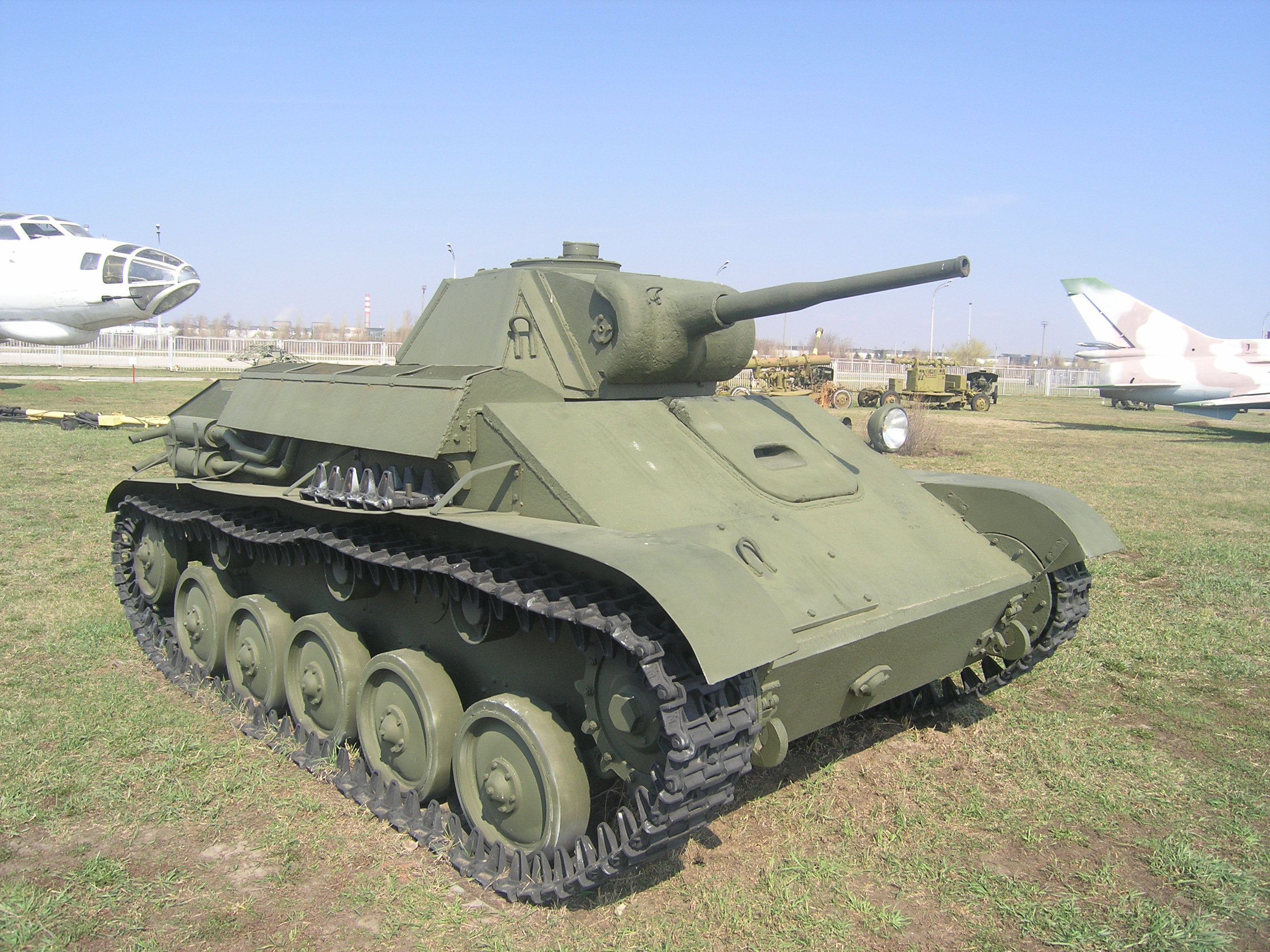
- T-70 at the technical museum in Togliatti
- Type: Light tank
- Place of origin: Soviet Union

Service history
- In service: 1942—1948
- Used by: Soviet Union; Poland; Czechoslovakia
- Wars: World War II

Production history
- Designer: Nicholas Astrov
- Designed: 1941—1942
- Manufacturer: Factory 37, Kirov, GAZ, Gorkiy, Factory 38, Kirov
- Produced: 1942—1943
- No. built: 8,226
- Variants: T-80 light tank

Specifications (T-70 model 1942)
- Mass: 9.2 tonnes
- Length: 4.29 m (14 ft 1 in)
- Width: 2.32 m (7 ft 7 in)
- Height: 2.04 m (6 ft 8 in)
- Crew: 2
- Armour: 10–50 mm
- Main armament: 45 mm 20K mod. 1932–34 tank gun
- Secondary armament: 7.62 mm DT
- Engine: 2 × GAZ-202 (gasoline); 70 + 70 hp (52 + 52 kW)
- Power/weight: 15 hp/tonne
- Suspension: torsion bar
- Fuel capacity: 440 L (120 US gal)
- Operational range: 360 km (220 mi)
- Maximum speed: 45 km/h (28 mph)

The T-70 is a light tank used by the Red Army during World War II, replacing both the T-60 scout tank for reconnaissance and the T-50 light infantry tank for infantry support.

The T-70 was armed with a 45-mm L/46 gun Model 38 with forty-five rounds carried, and a coaxial 7.62-mm DT machine gun. The tank was operated by a driver and a commander who loaded and fired the gun. Armour thickness on the turret front was 50 mm, turret sides and rear: 35 mm, upper glacis: 35 mm, hull sides: 15 mm, roof and bottom: 10 mm.

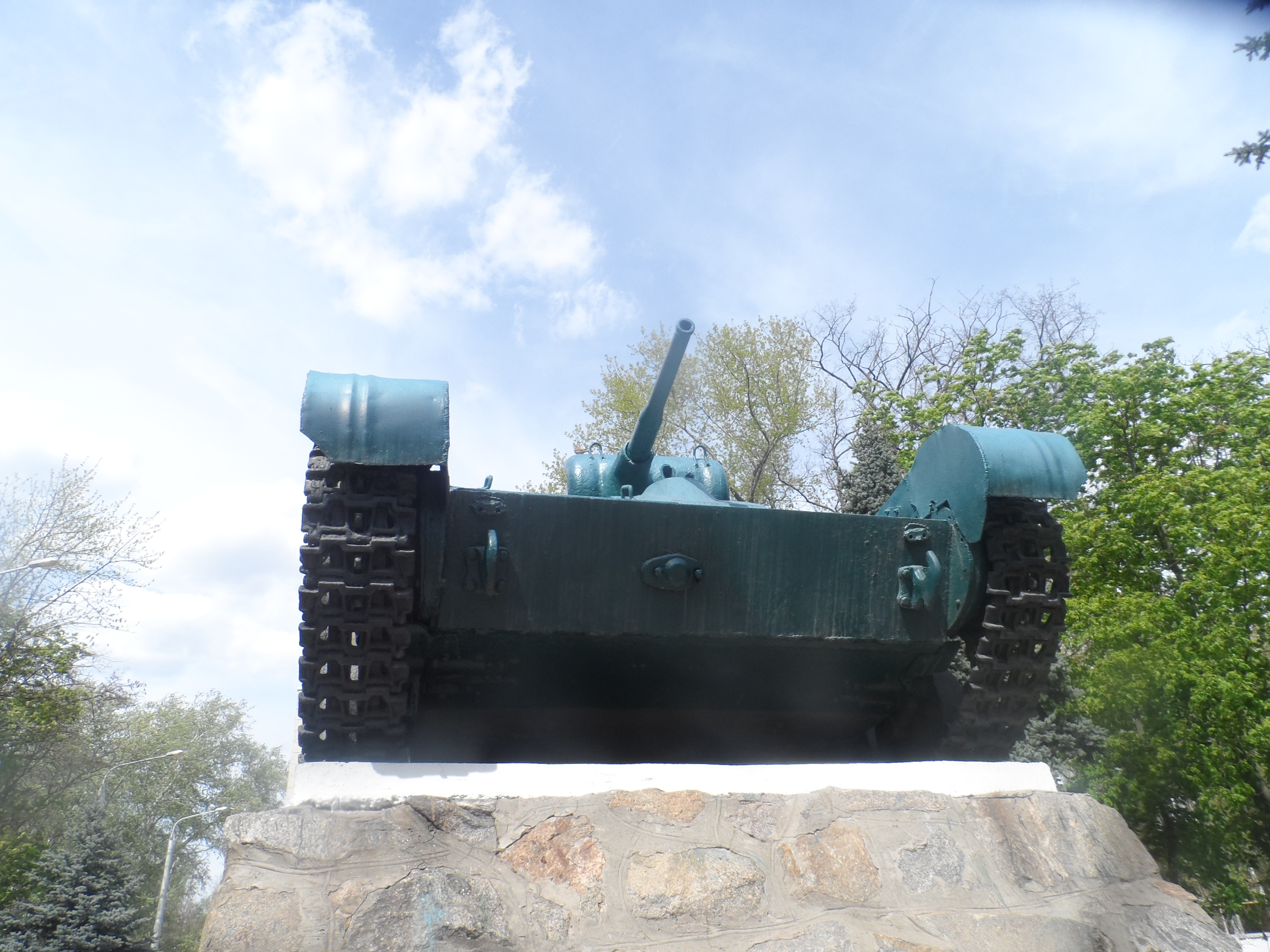

== Production history ==
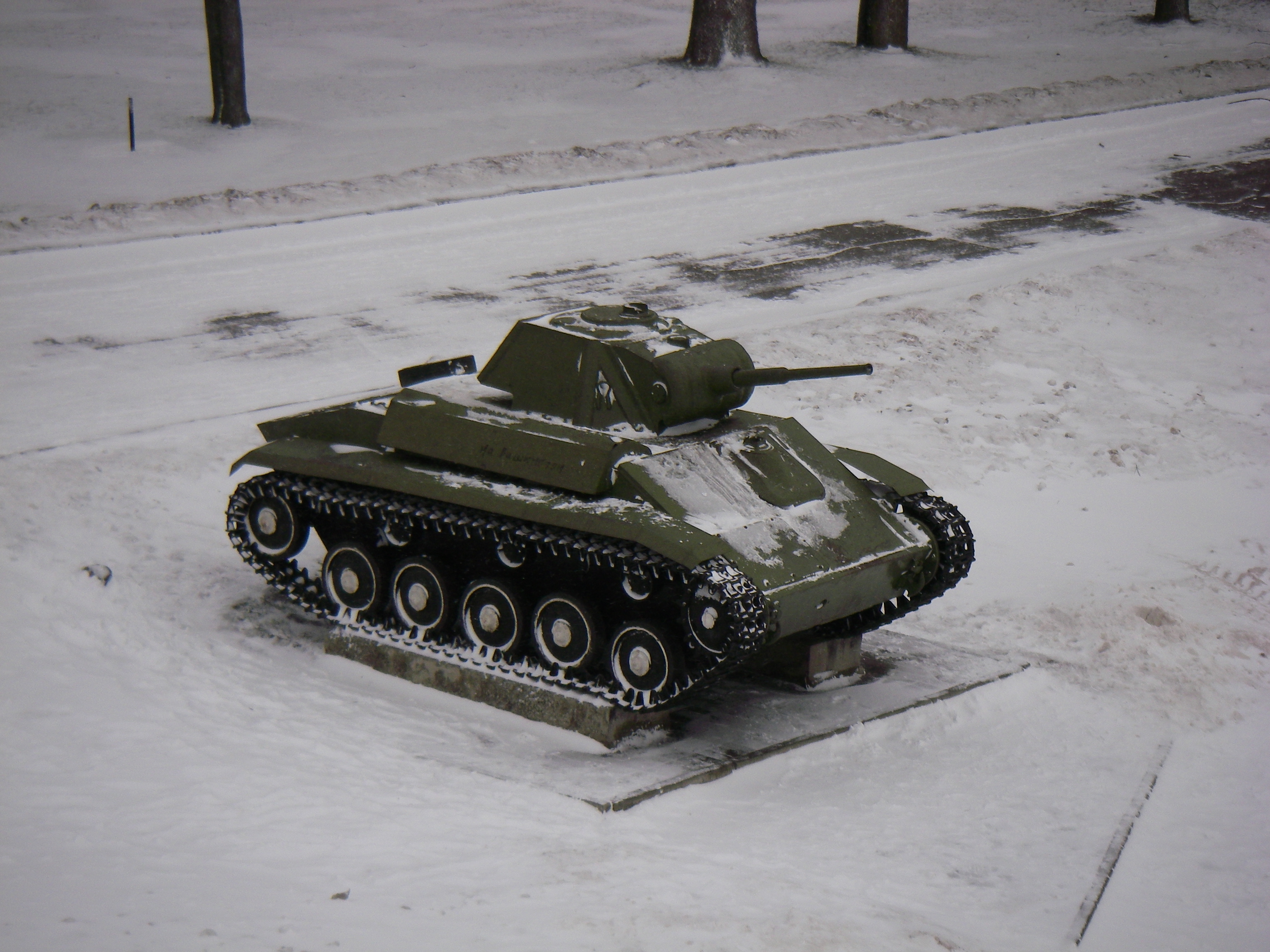
Model T-70 in Velikiy Novgorod

By 1942, light tanks were considered inadequate by the Red Army, unable to keep up with the T-34 medium tank and unable to penetrate the armour of most German tanks, but they could be produced by small factories that were unable to handle the large components of medium and heavy tanks. The T-70 was an attempt to remedy some of the shortcomings of the T-60 scout tank, which had very poor cross-country mobility, thin armour, and an inadequate 20-mm gun. It also replaced the very short production run of the T-50 light infantry tank, which was more sophisticated, but also much more complicated and expensive to produce.

The T-70 was designed by Nicholas Astrov's design team at Factory No. 38 in Kirov. The first batch of T-70s were built with a GAZ-202 automotive engine on each side of the hull, one driving each track. This arrangement was seen to be a serious problem, even before the first tanks were issued. It was quickly redesigned as the T-70M (although it continued to be referred to as just T-70), with the engines in-line on the right side of the tank and a normal transmission and differential. The conical turret was replaced by one more easily welded out of plate armour, and moved to the left side of the hull.

Curiously, even after the T-70's production line was redesigned, SU-76 self-propelled guns started to be built with the same unsatisfactory unsynchronized two-engine layout, and all of them were later recalled for factory rebuilding as SU-76Ms.

T-70s were put into production in March 1942 at Zavod No. 37, and along with T-60 production at GAZ and Zavod No. 38. They completely replaced T-60 production in September 1942, although that tank remained in use until the end of the war. Production ended in October 1943, with 8,226 vehicles completed.

In April 1942, the conical turrets on early-production machines were replaced with new welded turrets. The end of the T-70's production run was built with two 85-hp GAZ-203 engines, a Mark 4 commander's periscope replacing a vision slit, and other improvements.

The T-70 remained in service until 1948.

=== Decline of light tanks ===
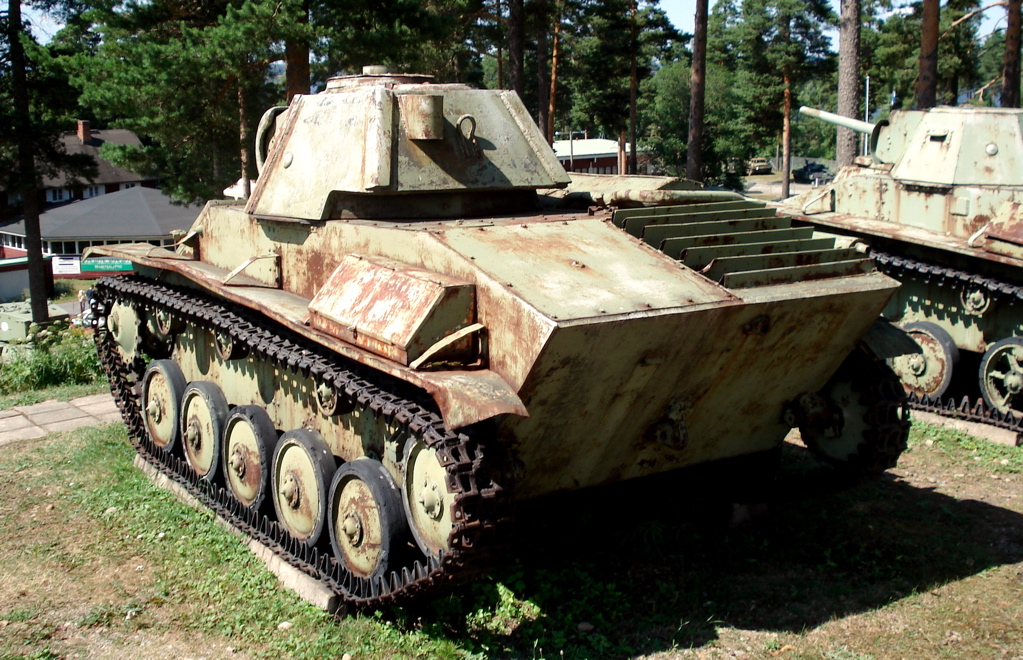
Rear view of the T-70 at the Parola Tank Museum

The one-man turret of the Soviet light tanks made co-ordinating a tank platoon nearly impossible, because the commanders were kept busy acquiring targets, loading and firing the main gun and machine gun and commanding their drivers. The infantry tank role was already considered obsolete. The SU-76 self-propelled gun was better suited for infantry support, its 76.2 mm gun capable of firing a larger high explosive shell. Industrial resources could be redirected from light tanks to building SU-76s. To compensate, the T-80 light tank was designed, a more robust version of the T-70 with a two-man turret.

There was enough lend-lease equipment available to fulfill the reconnaissance role of the light tanks, and armoured cars were better suited for light scouting and liaison. All light tank production was cancelled in October 1943, after only about 120 T-80s were built. No further light tanks would be built during the war. In November 1943 Red Army tank units were reorganized: light tanks were replaced by the T-34 and the new T-34-85 variant, which started production the following month. Light tanks continued to be used in self-propelled artillery and some other units. The Soviets did start development work on an amphibious light tank in 1945, resulting in the post-war PT-76, introduced in 1954.

== Variants ==
- SU-76 self-propelled gun: armoured assault gun with a 76mm ZiS-3 field gun mounted in a casemate on a modified T-70 chassis.
- T-90 self-propelled anti-aircraft gun: the Soviet Union lacked tracked, armoured self-propelled anti-aircraft guns at the beginning of World War II. The first serious design of a real air-defence vehicle was in 1942, when a twin 12.7 mm DShK machine gun turret with optical sights was built for mounting on the T-60 scout tank. The T-70 became available in the meantime, and was adopted as the basis for the T-90 self-propelled anti-aircraft gun. The program was cancelled in 1943, in favour of the ZSU-37 37 mm self-propelled anti-aircraft gun, built on an SU-76 chassis. The ZSU-37 used the cannon developed for the M1939 towed carriage.
- ZUT-37: prototype anti-aircraft tank armed with a Sh-37 cannon. The tank passed field tests but was not accepted into production.

== See also ==
- List of Soviet tanks - covers all periods
