= Semyon Alexandrovich Ginzburg =

Soviet tank designer (1900–1943)

Semyon Ginzburg
- Семён Гинзбург
- Born: 18 January 1900; Lugansk, Russian Empire
- Died: 3 August 1943 (aged 43); Malaya Tomarovka, Kursk Oblast
- Military career
- Allegiance: Soviet Union
- Branch: Red Army
- Known for: Participated in designing the T-26
- Conflicts: World War II; Eastern Front
- Awards: Order of Lenin; Order of the Red Star; Order of the Badge of Honour

Semyon Alexandrovich Ginzburg (Russian: Семён Алекса́ндрович Ги́нзбург) (1900–1943) was a Soviet tank designer. He was born in Lugansk, Russian Empire. He enrolled in business school in 1918, but then volunteered for the Red Army in 1919 and served in the light artillery squadron of the 3rd Rifle Division. After the division had retreated to Voronezh, Ginzburg enrolled in the Mikhailovsky Artillery Academy and graduated in 1920. He was appointed as a platoon commander in the 52nd Rifle Division and fought at Kakhovka and in Crimea. He continued his studies at the Dzerzhinsky Military Technology Academy in 1926 and graduated in 1929 after specializing in tank designs. He was one of the earliest tank designers in the Soviet Union who expressly studied to become one.

He worked in the GKB (the main design bureau) and in the KB-3 in Moscow. In 1930 he was a member of the Soviet purchasing committee in Great Britain that prepared buying a license for the Vickers 6-Ton tank.

Ginzburg then headed the OKMO experimental group in Leningrad preparing the production of the T-26, based on the acquired Vickers 6-Ton design. Later he was directly involved in development of experimental types like T-33, T-43, T-29, T-46-5, T-100 and T-126SP, as well as in the series built T-26, T-28, T-35 and T-50 types.

A deputy to Joseph Yakovlevich Kotin, himself a deputy to the People's Commissar of the Tank Industry, Ginzburg was directly responsible for development work of the SU-76 light self-propelled gun. The transmission problems of the first serial variant was a reason for his removal from that position and sending to front. He became a chief technical officer of 32nd tank brigade, and was killed during Battle of Kursk. He was buried near the village of Luchki, Tomarovsky District, Kursk Oblast (now Yakovlevsky District, Belgorod Oblast). In 1950, he was reburied in a mass grave in the village of Belenikhino, Prokhorovsky District, Belgorod Oblast (Vatutina Street, 150 meters south of the railway station).
