= SU-76 =

SU-76M
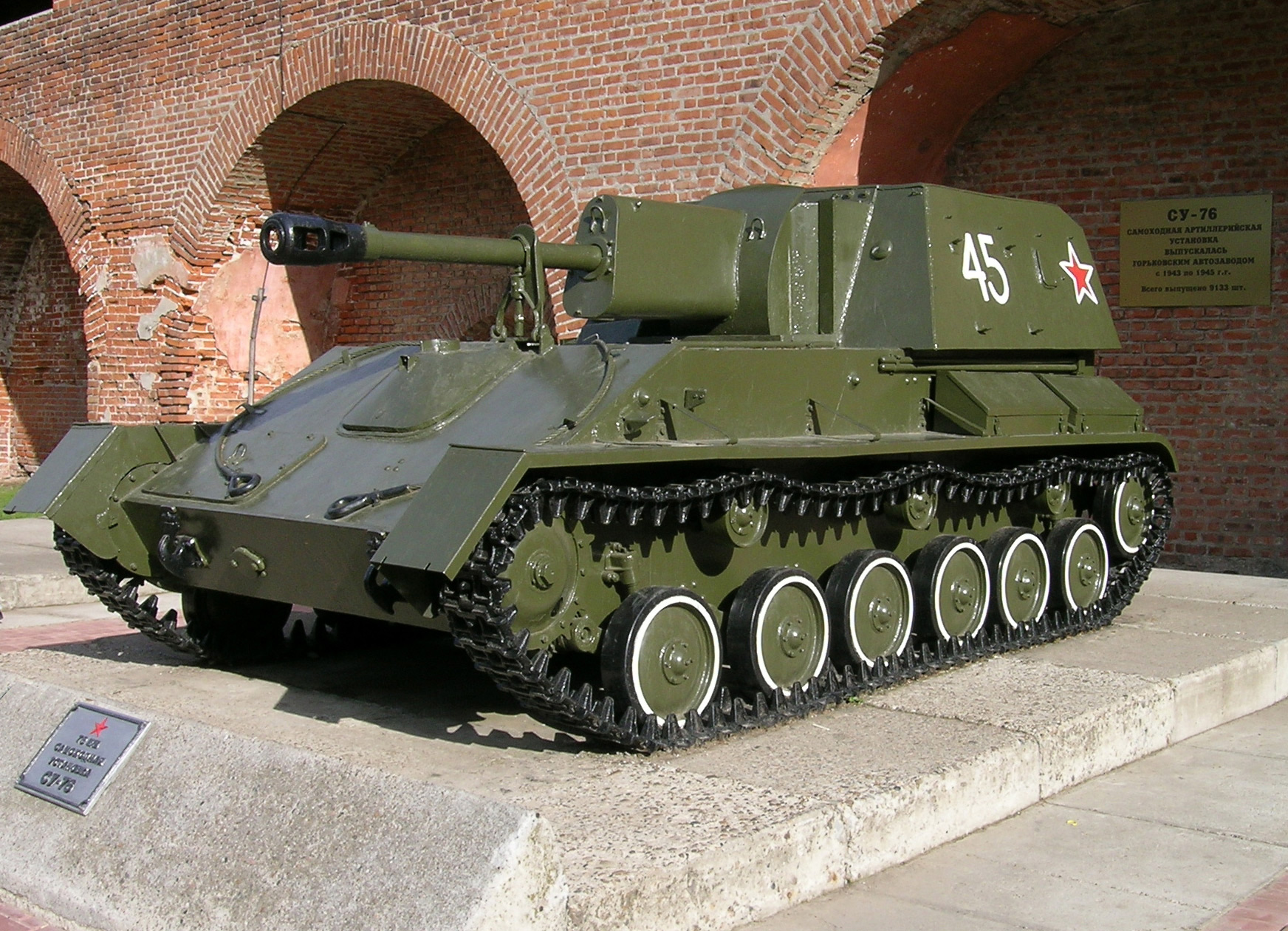
- SU-76M light self-propelled gun in the Memorial Complex "Gorky citizens in the Great Patriotic War", Nizhny Novgorod Kremlin, Russia
- Type: Light self-propelled gun
- Place of origin: Soviet Union

Production history
- Designer: S.A. Ginzburg Design Bureau
- Designed: 1942
- Manufacturer: GAZ (Gorky), Plant No. 40 (Mytishchi), Plant No. 38 (Kirov, Kirov Oblast)
- Produced: December 1942 – October 1945
- No. built: 14,292 (560 SU-76 & 13,732 SU-76M)

Specifications
- Mass: 10,500 kg (23,150 lb)
- Length: 4.97 m (16 ft 4 in)
- Width: 2.72 m (8 ft 11 in)
- Height: 2.10 m (6 ft 11 in)
- Crew: 4
- Armour: Front: 25–35 mm (0.98–1.38 in); Side: 10–15 mm (0.39–0.59 in)
- Main armament: 76.2 mm (3 in) ZIS-3 mod. 1942 divisional field gun
- Secondary armament: 7.62 mm DT tank machine gun
- Engine: GAZ-203 (2 × GAZ-202 6-cylinder gasoline engines); 2 × 70 hp (2 × 51.5 kW)
- Power/weight: 13.3 hp/t
- Suspension: torsion bar
- Fuel capacity: 412 L (108.8 gal)
- Operational range: Road: 250 km (160 mi); Cross-country: 175 km (109 mi)
- Maximum speed: 45 km/h (28.0 mph)

The SU-76 (Samokhodnaya Ustanovka 76) was a Soviet light self-propelled gun used during and after World War II. The SU-76 was based on a lengthened version of the T-70 light tank chassis and armed with the ZIS-3 mod. 1942 76-mm divisional field gun. Developed under the leadership of chief designer S.A. Ginzburg (1900–1943), its quite simple construction and multipurpose combat role made it the second most produced Soviet armored fighting vehicle of World War II, after the T-34 medium tank.

== History ==
=== SU-76 ===
Design of the SU-76 began in June 1942, when the State Defense Committee (GKO) ordered the construction of infantry support self-propelled guns armed with the ZIS-3 76-mm divisional field gun and the M-30 122-mm howitzer. The T-70 light tank chassis was chosen by chief designer S.A. Ginzburg for mounting the ZIS-3 gun, and basic tank's hull was lengthened, adding one road wheel per side, to facilitate better gun mounting. The gun was installed in the embrasure of the front armored plate of the fixed fully closed armored casemate above the rear of the hull. The power plant consisted of two engines connected in parallel with the transmission. The units of the latter were also paralleled and connected at the level of the main gears. The mechanic-driver sat in the bow of the vehicle, and the gun crew of three men including the commander (usually junior lieutenant) was located in the casemate. The SU-76 (factory designation SU-12) was put into service by a GKO decree of 2 December 1942.

The first batch of SU-76s (25 units) was manufactured by 1 January 1943, and sent to the self-propelled artillery training center. At the end of January, the first two self-propelled artillery regiments of a mixed organization (1433rd and 1434th) were sent to the Volkhov Front to participate in breaking the siege of Leningrad. In March 1943, two more regiments were formed - the 1485th and 1487th, which participated in battles on the Western Front (Soviet Union).

However, already after 10 days of military operation, most of the SU-76s were out of order due to breakdowns in gearboxes and main shafts. An attempt to correct the situation by strengthening the shafts did not lead to anything. Moreover, such vehicles failed even more often. It became obvious that the transmission of the SU-76 had a fundamental design flaw, which was the parallel installation of two twin engines that worked on a common shaft. Such transmission scheme led to the occurrence of resonant torsional vibrations on the shafts. Moreover, the maximum value of the resonant frequency accounted for the most intense mode of operation of the engines (driving in 2nd gear off-road), which led to their rapid failure. Elimination of this defect required time, therefore, on 21 March 1943, the production of the SU-76 was suspended. A total of 560 units were built at Plant No. 38 in Kirov. During the investigation that followed the mass failure of SPGs in the winter of 1943, a commission chaired by I.M. Zaltsman defined that the main culprit was the head of the Department of the Chief Designer of the People's Commissariat of the Tank Industry S.A. Ginzburg, who was removed from his position and sent to the front as the head of the repair service of the 32nd tank brigade belonged to the 29th tank corps. Stalin, having learned about this, did not approve of such a hasty decision, and ordered the talented tank designer to be recalled from the front, but it was too late - Ginzburg was killed in action.

=== SU-76M ===
A more reliable vehicle, the SU-15, appeared as a result of a competition announced by the management of the People's Commissariat of the Tank Industry for a light assault SPG armed with a 76-mm divisional gun. GAZ and Plant No. 38 took part in the competition. Tests of the new self-propelled guns took place at the Gorokhovets artillery training ground in July 1943, at the height of the Battle of Kursk. The SU-15 enjoyed the greatest success with the military, and it was recommended for mass production after some improvements. It was necessary to lighten the vehicle, which was done by removing the armored roof over the casemate, at the same time this solved all problems with its ventilation, and also facilitated the boarding and disembarkation of the crew as well as the gun maintenance. In July 1943, the SU-15M under the army designation SU-76M was adopted by the Red Army.

After production of the light SPGs resumed, GAZ and Plant No. 40 in Mytishchi near Moscow joined it in autumn 1943 (the same time the production of T-70 light tanks was fully finished), and as a result 13,732 SU-76Ms were built. More than 9,000 of these SPGs were built solely by Gorky Automobile Plant (GAZ), which became the main plant for the production of the SU-76M from 1 January 1944. The SU-76M became the second most produced Soviet armored fighting vehicle of World War II, after the T-34 medium tank. Under the leadership of the chief designer N.A. Astrov, since the autumn of 1943, work had been going on at GAZ to improve the SPG and adapt its design to mass production conditions. Changes were made to the design of the SU-76M. Vehicles of later series received a higher rear armor plate of the fighting compartment with two firing ports and a larger door, a tube welded to the right and left sides at the back of a casemate appeared to mount a machine gun for anti-aircraft defense. Firing ports of a new shape began to be used, more adapted for firing from a machine gun, etc. Mass production of the SU-76M ceased in October 1945. In contemporary accounts SU-76Ms are often referred to in texts, public radio and TV broadcasting as SU-76s with the "M" omitted, due to their ubiquity in comparison with the original SU-76s.

The layout of the SU-76M and its chassis remained unchanged compared to the SU-76. But the SU-76M had an armored casemate open at the top and partly behind. Two chief designers at the GAZ, N.A. Astrov and A.A. Lipgart, changed the power plant arrangement to that of the T-70 light tank - two GAZ-202 engines were connected in series and installed on the right hand side of the vehicle. The transmission consisted of a two-disk main clutch of dry friction, a four-speed gearbox of the ZIS-5 type, a main drive, side clutches and side drives.

The SU-76M had a clearance 0.3 m (1 ft 0 in). The SPG could climb a slope of 28^{o}, overcame a 1.6 m (5 ft 3 in) wide trench, a 0.6 m (2 ft 0 in) high wall and a 0.9 m (2 ft 11 in) deep ford.

The ZIS-3 gun pointing angles ranged from -5^{o} to +15^{o} vertically and 15^{o} left and right horizontally. The rate of fire of the gun with the pointing correction was 10 rounds per minute, with the rapid fire - up to 20 rounds per minute.

The SU-76 was the basis for the first serial Soviet tracked armored anti-aircraft vehicle, the ZSU-37. Mass production of the ZSU-37 was continued after SU-76M production ceased. The majority of SU-76Ms had been withdrawn from the Soviet army service in the beginning of 1950s, although some were retained as training vehicles for tank crews as late as 1960s.

== Variants ==
OSU-76
Experimental model based on the T-60 light tank chassis and armed with the 76-mm gun ZIS-3, three prototypes were built in summer 1944.
SU-76 (factory index SU-12)
Based on a lengthened T-70 light tank chassis, with the inferior dual-engine arrangement of earlier T-70s. Only 560 units were produced, and these were quickly withdrawn from front line service because of transmission problem, which was the parallel installation of two twin engines that worked on a common shaft. The casemate of this version had armored roof, but it caused ventilation issues and was sometimes removed in field depots. Combat mass was 11,200 kg (24,692 lb).
SU-76 (factory index SU-15M)
Also commonly referred as SU-76M. Main production model (13,732 units were produced). The casemate was open at the top and partly behind. The power plant was taken from the later T-70 light tank and consisted of two GAZ-202 engines connected in series. Combat mass was 10,500 kg (23,149 lb).
SU-85A/SU-85B (factory index SU-15A/SU-15B)
The SU-85A and SU-85B were based on the SU-76M with an elongated hull. The SU-85A was armed with the 85-mm D-5S-85A gun and a prototype was tested in 1944, although flaws were found in the prototype such as stability during firing not being adequate. The SU-85B was an improved version of the SU-85A with the 85-mm LB-2 gun and an improved fighting compartment and suspension. The SU-85B prototype was tested in April and May of 1945 and was recommended for production, but did not due to cutbacks on vehicle production after the war.
ZSU-37
Self-propelled anti-aircraft gun, based on the SU-76M.

In 1978, Institute 111 from Romania designed an armoured personnel carrier based on the SU-76M chassis, equipped with the TAB-71 turret. The vehicle entered service as the MLVM (Romanian: Mașina de Luptă a Vânătorilor de Munte, meaning "infantry fighting vehicle of vânători de munte").

== Unrelated vehicles ==
The unrelated SU-76i (the "i" standing for "inostrannaya", or 'foreign', in Russian), first designed and fielded in 1943, was based on captured stocks of German Panzer III and StuG III chassis, a large quantity coming from defeated German troops after the Battle of Stalingrad that year. This partially-modified vehicle was armed with an S-1 76.2 mm tank gun (a cheaper variant of the renowned F-34/ZIS-5 guns which were already mounted on T-34 and KV-1 tanks respectively) in a casemate superstructure but retained the original German Maybach gasoline engine and its torsion-bar suspension system. Around 200 of these ex-German vehicles were sent for conversion into SU-76is at Factory No. 37 to supplement the existing SU-76. They were issued to tank and self-propelled gun units starting in the fall of 1943. They were eventually withdrawn from the front in early 1944 and then used for training and testing until the end of 1945. Only 2 have survived the war, most having been scrapped after 1945. A similar vehicle called SG-122 existed, which was a similar Panzer III conversion, but armed with 122 mm M-30 howitzer. Only around 20 were converted, as the M-30 was considered an insufficient weapon for infantry support.

The also unrelated SU-76P (1941) was based on the T-26 chassis. It was built in Leningrad during the Siege of Leningrad and involved removing the turret from the T-26 and mounting a 76 mm regimental gun M1927 on the engine deck. This was created due to the lack of high-explosive 45 mm ammunition inside Leningrad due to the siege, so some T-26 tanks were rearmed with 37mm or 76mm guns for which a reliable source of ammunition was available. They served until 1944, when the siege was broken. They were originally called "SU-76s", until the SU-76 came into service, upon which it was renamed "SU-76P" ("polkovaya" - regimental).

== SU-76M in combat ==
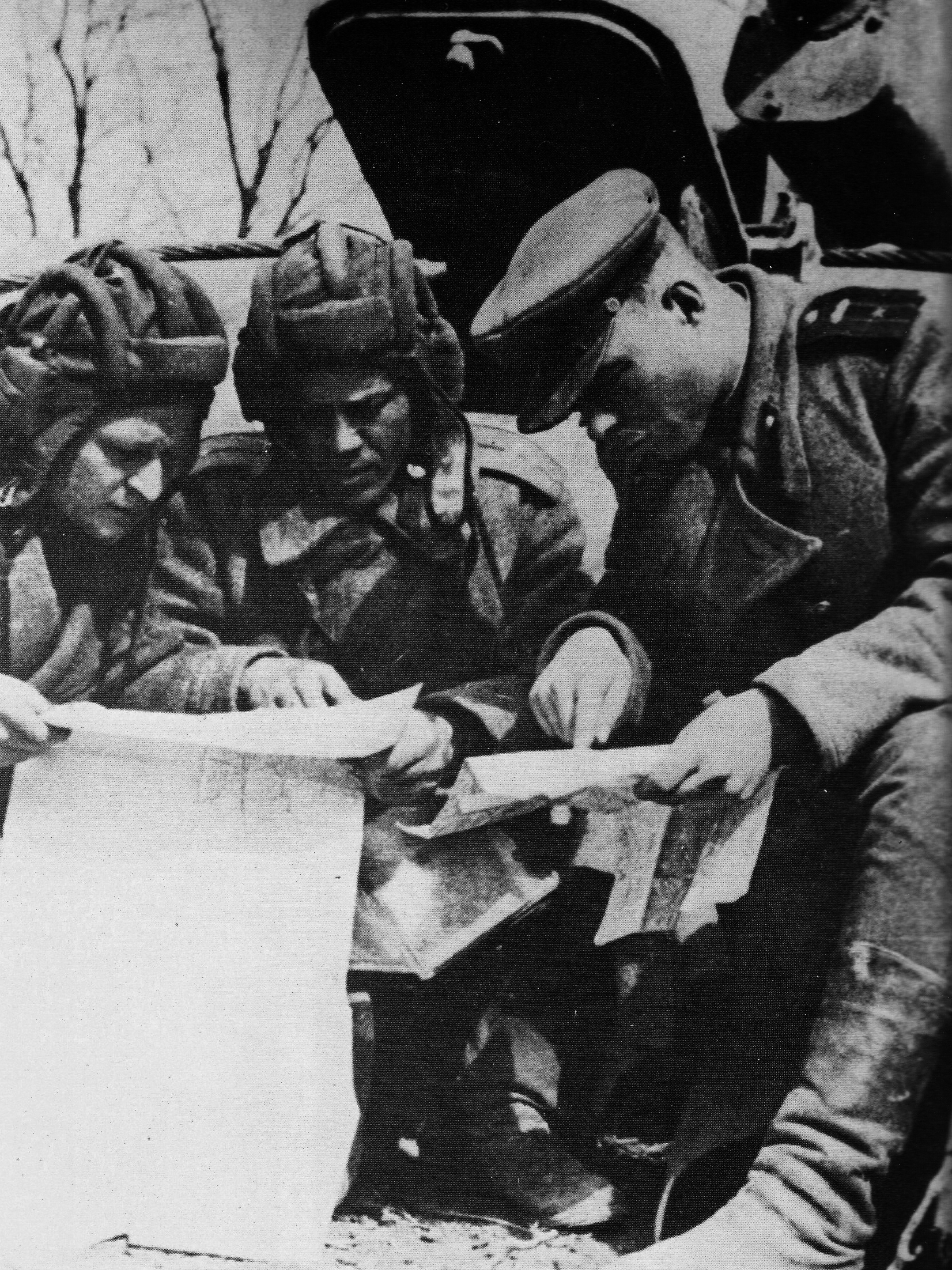
Soviet tank troops (Battle of Budapest, October 1944).

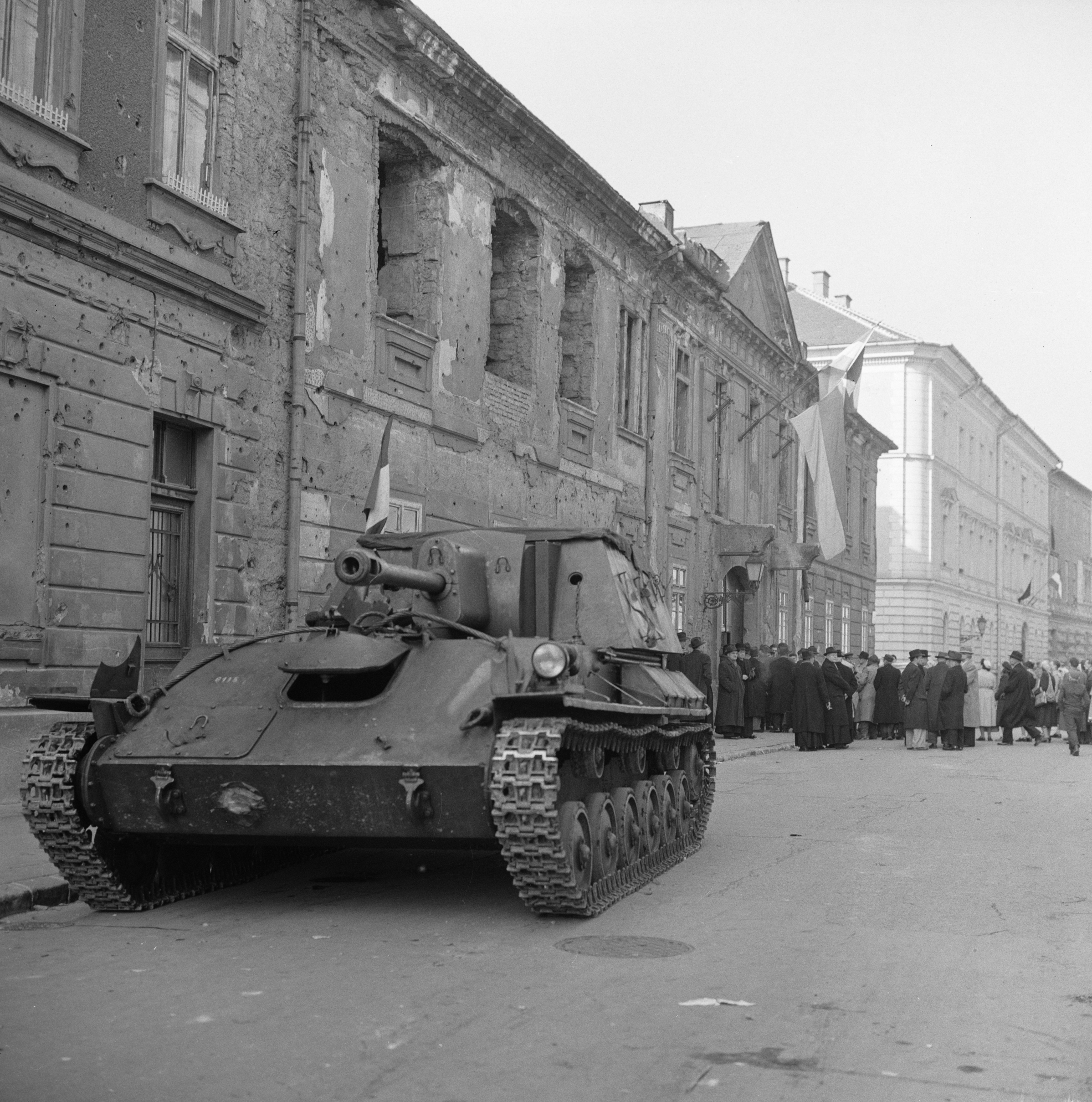
Su-76M in the streets of Budapest during the 1956 uprising.

The SU-76M virtually replaced light tanks in the close support role. While its thin armour and open top made it vulnerable to anti-tank weapons and grenades, its light weight and low ground pressure gave it good maneuverability and low noise on the move. The SU-76M was a reliable vehicle (the GAZ-203 engine confidently ran no less than 350 hours without serious breakdowns). But the main advantage of these light SPGs was their wide versatility.

According to the table of organization and equipment of 1943, each light self-propelled artillery regiment was equipped with 21 SU-76Ms; there were 119 such regiments in the Red Army by the end of World War II. In the end of 1944 and the beginning of 1945, 70 self-propelled artillery divizions (16 SU-76Ms each) were formed to be included into rifle divisions. Some rifle divisions, formed according to special reinforced states - for instance, the 9th plastun rifle volunteer division - even received a self-propelled artillery regiment (initially equipped with 8 SU-76M and 12 SU-122). Also 4 light self-propelled artillery brigades of the Reserve of the Supreme High Command (60 SU-76M SPGs, 5 T-70 light tanks and 3 US M3A1 Scout Car armored personnel carriers in each) were formed, starting from the first half of 1944.

The SU-76M was a multipurpose SPG and combined three main battlefield roles: light assault gun for infantry support, mobile anti-tank weapon and mobile gun for indirect fire. With all these tasks, the light SPGs successfully coped. The SU-76M had a large number of ammunition types. They included armour-piercing (usual, with ballistic nose and subcaliber hyper-velocity), hollow charge, high explosive, fragmentation, shrapnel and incendiary projectiles. This made the SU-76M an excellent multi-purpose light armoured fighting vehicle.

As a light assault gun, the SU-76M was well-regarded by Soviet infantrymen (in contrast to their own crews). It had a more powerful gun than any previous light tank for close support of infantry in defense and offensive, and communication between infantry and the SU-76M crew was simple due to the partially open fighting compartment. This was extremely useful in urban combats like the Battle of Berlin where good teamwork between infantry and AFVs was a key to success.

The SU-76M was effective against any medium or light German tank. It could also knock out the Panther tank with a flank shot, but the ZIS-3 gun was not effective against Tiger tanks. Soviet manuals for SU-76M crews usually instructed the gunner to aim for the tracks or gun barrels when facing Tigers. To improve the SU-76M's anti-armour capabilities, armour-piercing composite rigid (APCR) and hollow charge projectiles were introduced. This gave the SU-76M a better chance against heavily armoured German vehicles. A low profile, a low noise signature and good mobility were other advantages of the SU-76M. This was ideal for organizing ambushes and surprise flank or rear strikes in close combat, where the ZIS-3 gun was sufficient against most German armoured fighting vehicles.

The maximum elevation angle of the SU-76M's gun was the highest of all Soviet self-propelled guns. The maximum indirect fire distance was nearly 13 km. SU-76Ms were sometimes used as light artillery vehicles (like the German Wespe) for counter-battery fights, bombardments or indirect fire support. However, the power of the 76.2 mm shells was not sufficient in some cases.

The SU-76M was the single Soviet vehicle able to operate in swamps with minimal support from engineers. During Operation Bagration in 1944 it was extremely useful for organizing surprise attacks through swamps, bypassing heavy German defenses on firmer ground. Usually only lightly armed infantry could pass through large swampy areas. With SU-76M support, Soviet soldiers and engineers could effectively destroy enemy strongpoints and continue the advance.

The reliability and good driving performance of the SU-76M proved to be especially in demand at the final stages of World War II, during the liberation of Poland and battles in Germany. Relatively maneuverable and fast, SU-76Ms sometimes additionally armed with trophy machine guns and carrying infantry on its deck were often included into vanguards to pursue the retreating enemy. SU-76M SPGs took part in combat operations on the Eastern Front until the end of World War II, and then in the Soviet–Japanese War. During World War II, 130 SU-76Ms were given to the Polish People's Army.

In the post-war period, the SU-76M was in service with the Soviet Army until the early 1950s, and in the armies of a number of countries even longer. The SU-76M SPGs of the Korean People's Army took part in the Korean War; a small number of them were captured and used by South Korea after the landing at Incheon. The SU-76M was in service with the Polish People's Army until the mid-1950s. During the same period, SU-76Ms were used in the Czechoslovak and Romanian armies. The SU-76M served in the National People's Army of the German Democratic Republic (GDR) until the early 1960s, and in the Border Troops of the German Democratic Republic they served even longer - until the early 1970s.

== Former operators ==
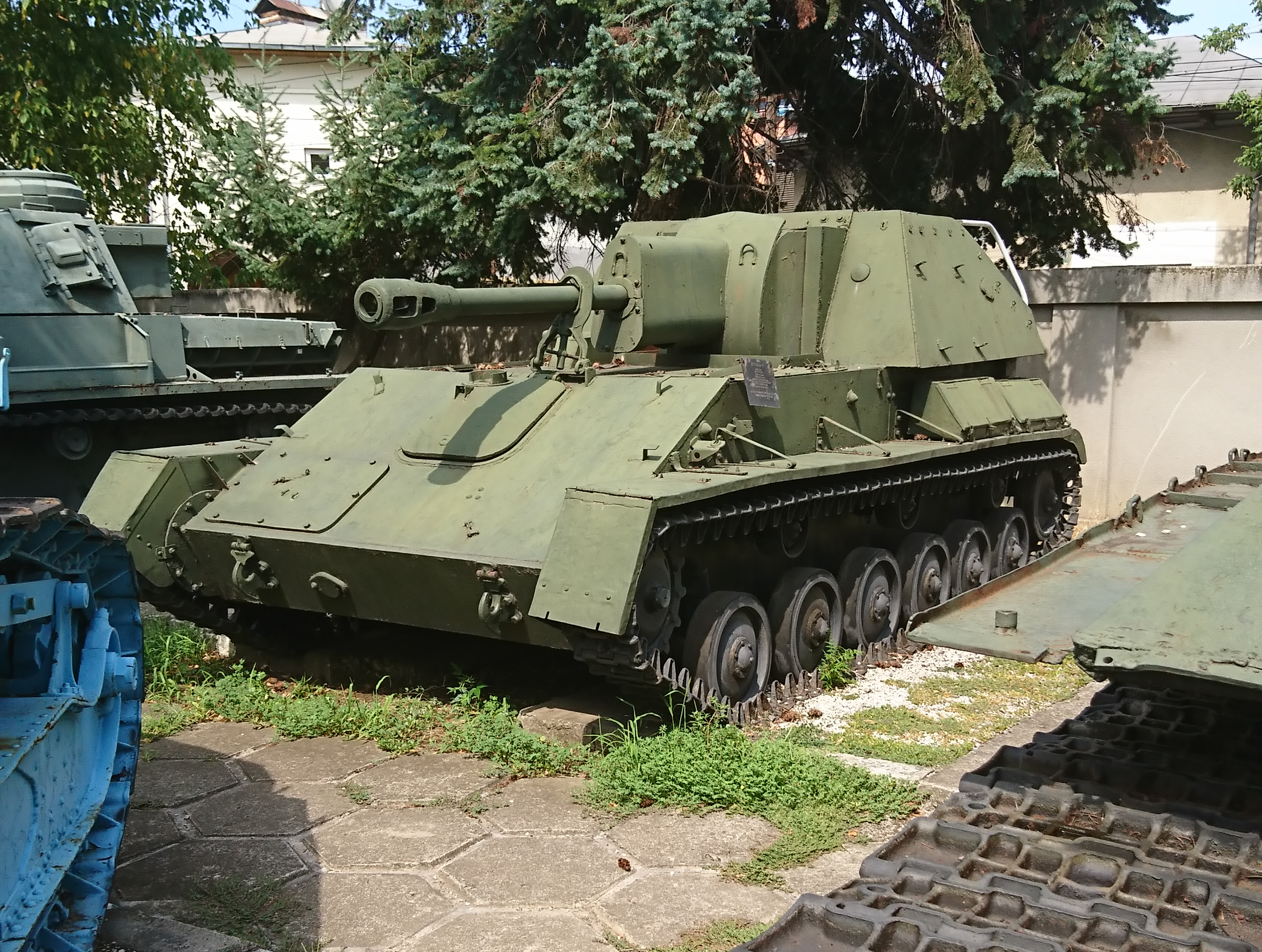
SU-76 next to a Panzer 4 at the National Military Museum, Romania

- Albania
- China
- Czechoslovakia
- East Germany – 260, in active service until the early 1960s in the National People's Army and until the early 1970s in the Border Troops of the German Democratic Republic.
- North Korea – 75 were transferred by the Soviet Union, saw extensive combat during the Korean War.
- Poland – 130 were given to the Polish People's Army during WWII, in active service until the mid-1950s.
- Romania – 352 acquired by 1957.
- Soviet Union – In active service in the Soviet Army until the early 1950s.
- Vietnam – 30, saw extensive combat during the Vietnam War.
- Yugoslavia

== Surviving examples ==
Due to the large number of vehicles produced, many SU-76Ms have survived the post-war years, and most of the larger Russian military museums have examples of the SU-76M in their exhibitions. They can also be found at the German-Soviet War monuments or memorials in different Russian, Belarusian, and Ukrainian cities.

=== In museums ===
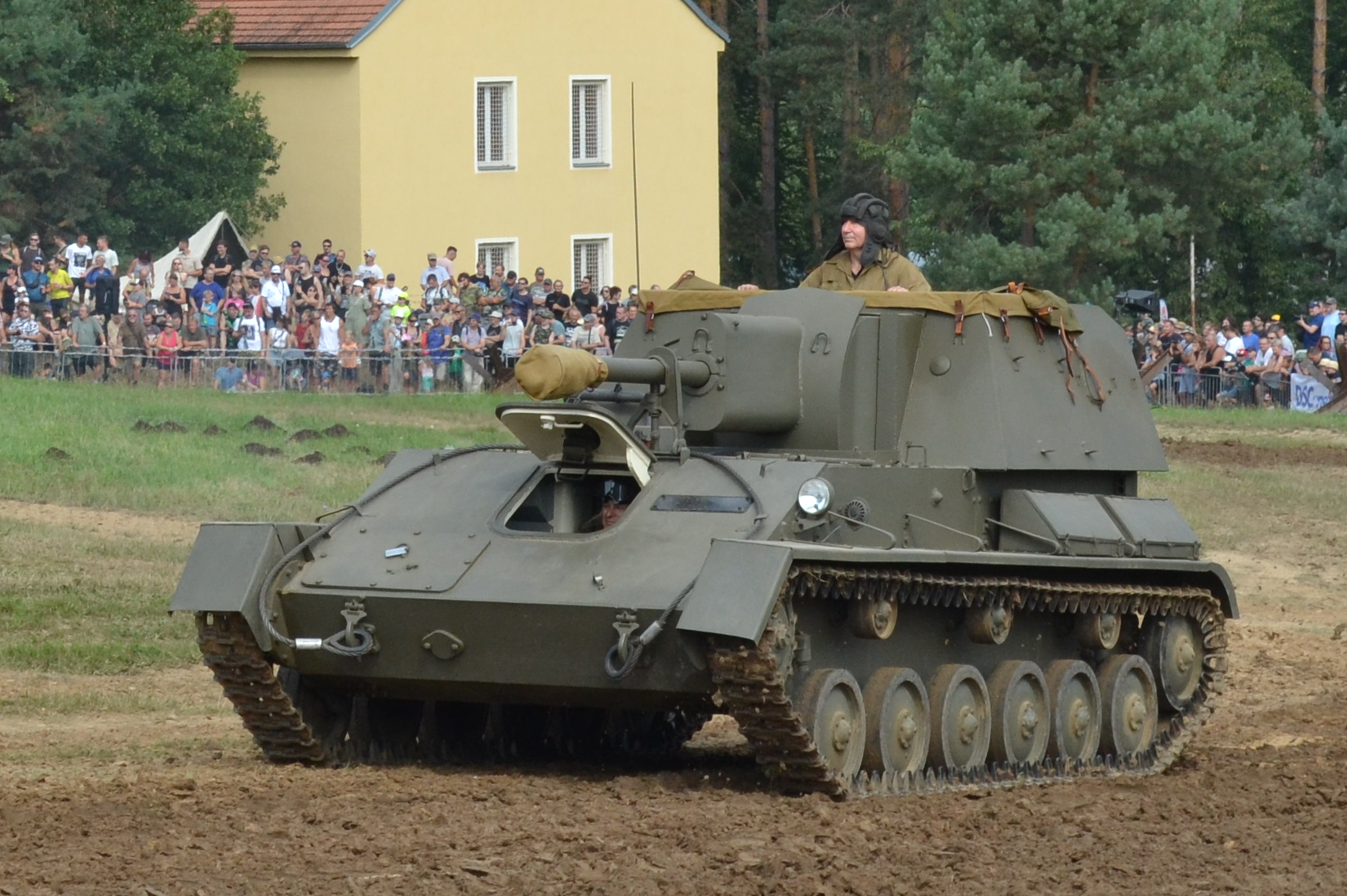
SU-76M of the Military Technical Museum Lešany

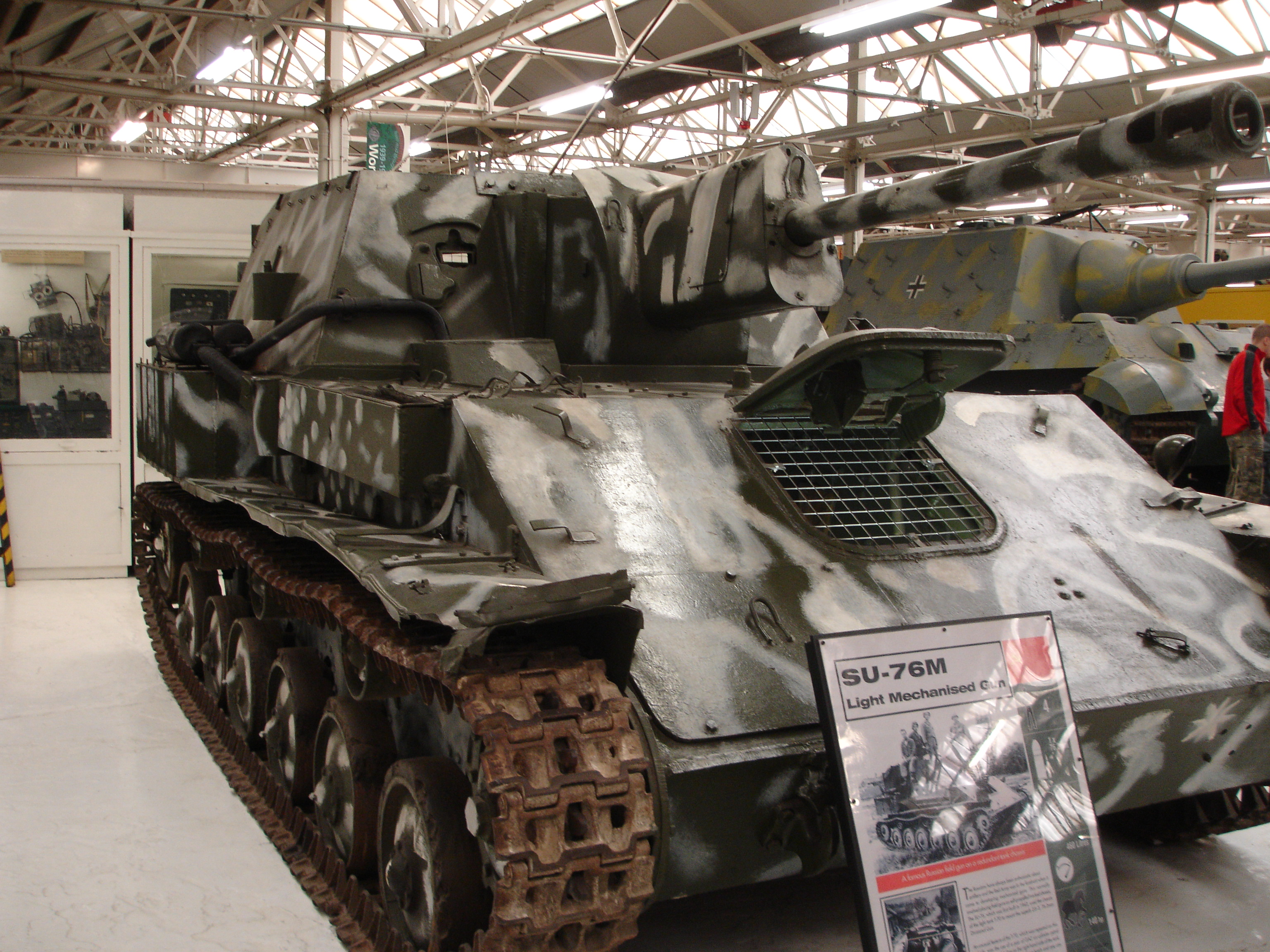
Soviet SU-76M in Bovington tank museum, Dorset.

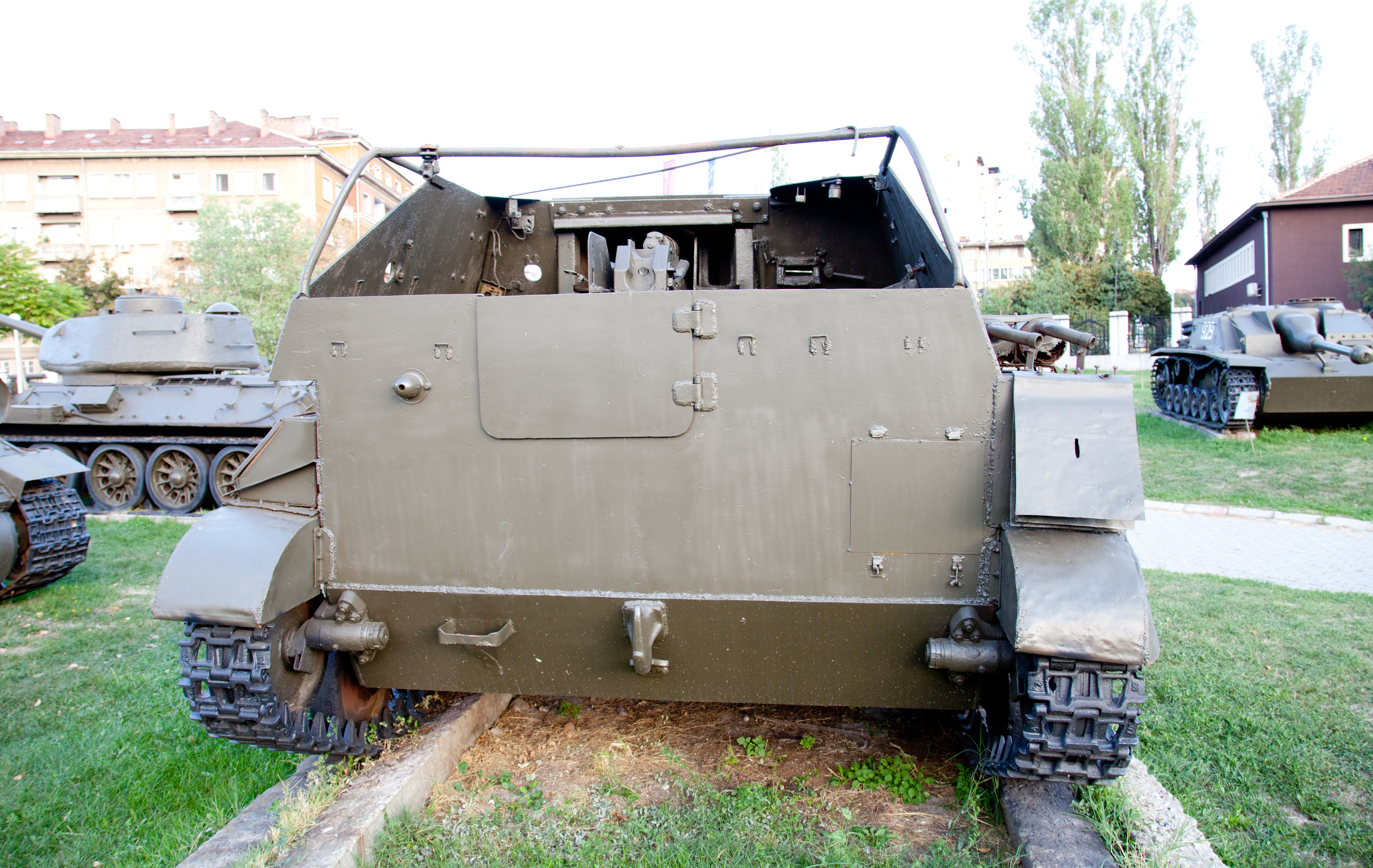
SU-76M in the National Museum of Military History (Bulgaria).

- Albania
  - Museum of Armed Forces
- Australia
  - The Australian Armour and Artillery Museum (Cairns) SU-76M
- Bulgaria
  - National Museum of Military History, Sofia.
- China
  - The Chinese Tank Museum (Beijing) SU-76
- Czech Republic
  - Military Technical Museum Lešany - in running condition
- Poland
  - Muzeum Oręża Polskiego in Kołobrzeg - SU-76
  - Armoured Weapon Museum in Poznań - SU-76M
  - Polish Army Museum in Warsaw
    - exhibition in front of the main building - SU-76 tactical number 203, serial number 403062
    - Museum of Polish Military Technology - SU-76 tactical number 207
- Romania
  - National Military Museum, Romania in Bucharest
- Russia
  - Central Armed Forces Museum in Moscow
  - Technical Museum of Vadim Zadorozhny in Krasnogorsky District, Moscow Oblast - in running condition
  - Kubinka Tank Museum in Kubinka, Moscow Oblast
  - Museum of Military History in Padikovo, Istrinsky District, Moscow Oblast - in running condition
  - Military Historical Museum of Artillery, Engineers and Signal Corps in Saint Petersburg
  - Memorial Complex "Gorky citizens in the Great Patriotic War" in Nizhny Novgorod Kremlin
  - Mount Sapun Museum Memorial Complex in Sevastopol
- United Kingdom
  - The Tank Museum in Bovington - SU-76M captured from North Korea in 1950

== See also ==
- List of Soviet tanks
- List of Soviet Union military equipment of World War II

=== Comparable vehicles ===
- German Marder I, II and III
- Italian Semovente da 75/34
- Romanian TACAM T-60 and TACAM R-2
- Spanish Verdeja 75 mm
