= List of World War II weapons of the United States =

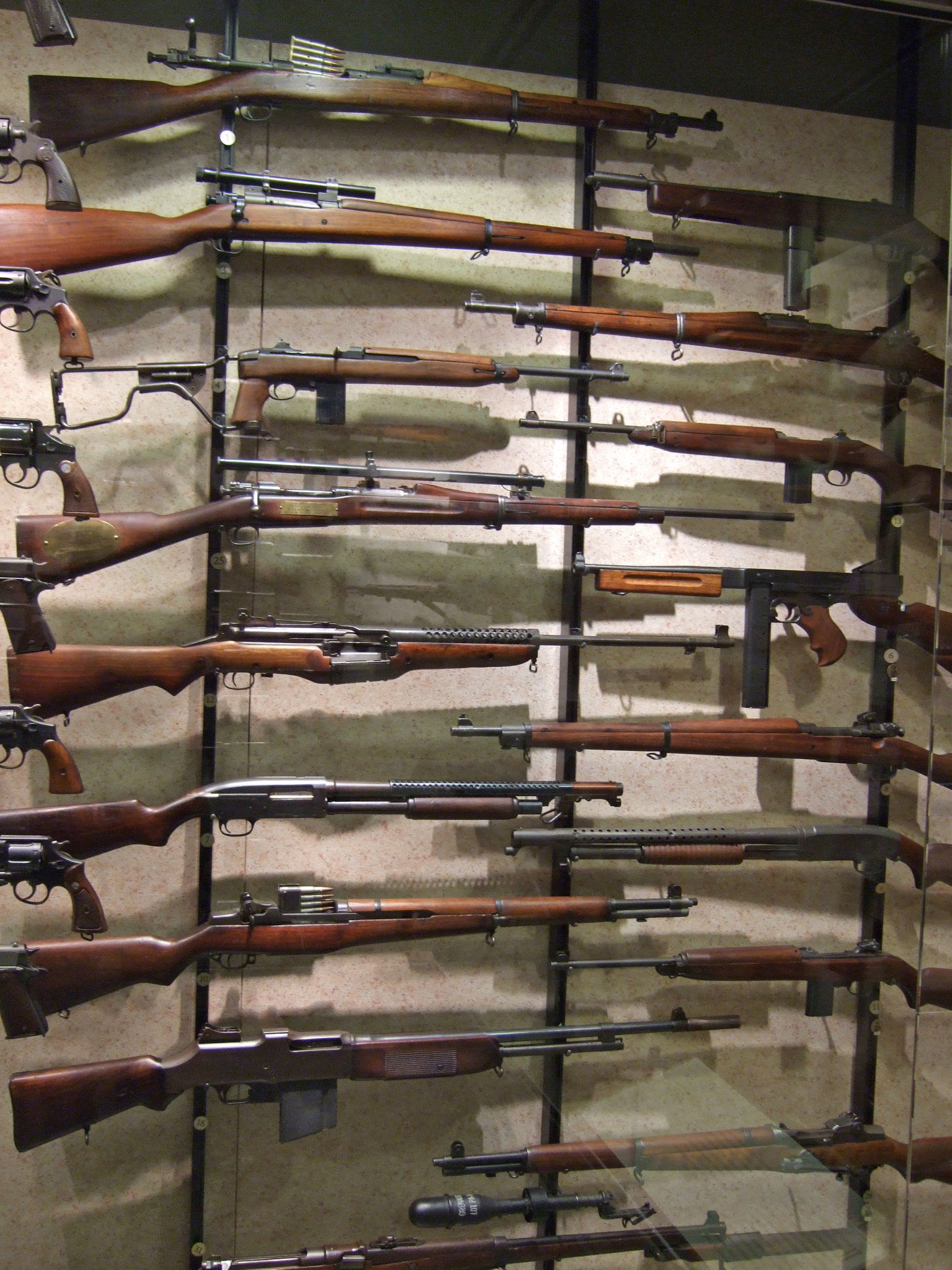
Various firearms used by the United States military during World War II, displayed at the National Firearms Museum in Fairfax County, Virginia

The following is a list of World War II weapons of the United States, which includes firearm, artillery, vehicles, vessels, and other support equipment known to have been used by the United States Armed Forces—namely the United States Army, United States Army Air Forces, United States Marine Corps, United States Navy, and United States Coast Guard—as well as the Office of Strategic Services and other U.S. government agencies involved in the war, during American involvement between 1941 and 1945. This list includes experimental technology that, while created during the war, was never issued as intended.

== Blades ==
- Mark I trench knife
- M1 bayonet
- M1917 bayonet
- M3 fighting knife
- M4 bayonet
- Ka-bar
- Bolo knife
- Bowie knife
- United States Marine Raider stiletto
- V-42 stiletto

== Small arms ==
=== Pistols (manual and semi-automatic) ===
Image	Name	Type	Role/s	Action	Origin	Base model/s	Manufacturer/s	Cartridge/s	Effective firing range (m)	From (year)	Estimated wartime quantity	Unloaded wt (kg)	Notes
	Colt M1911A1	Pistol	Sidearm	Recoil-operated (Short recoil)	United States		Colt Springfield	.45 ACP		1911		1.1	
	Colt M1903	Pistol	Sidearm	Blowback, single action	United States		Colt	.32 ACP (M1903).380 ACP (M1908)		1903		0.68	
	Colt New Service revolver	Revolver	Sidearm	Double action	United States		Colt	.45 ACP, .45 Colt, .44-40 Winchester, .38-40, .44 Russian, .44 Special, .44-40, .38 Special, .357 Magnum		1909	356000		
	Colt M1917 revolver	Revolver	Sidearm	Double action, rotating cylinder	United States		Colt	.45 ACP, .45 Auto Rim		1917		1.1	
	Smith & Wesson M1917 revolver	Revolver	Sidearm	Double/single action, swing-out cylinder	United States		Smith & Wesson	.45 ACP, .45 Auto Rim		1917		1.0	
	Colt Official Police	Revolver	Sidearm	Double action	United States		Colt	.22 Long Rifle, .32-20, .38 Special, .38/200, .41 Long Colt		1907			
	Smith & Wesson Model 10 revolver	Revolver	Sidearm	Double action	United States		Smith & Wesson	.38 Long Colt, .38 Special, .38 S&W		1899		0.907	

=== Automatic pistols and submachine guns ===
Image	Name	Type	Role/s	Action	Origin	Base model/s	Manufacturer/s	Cartridge/s	Effective firing range (m)	Cyclic rate of fire (rpm)	From (year)	Estimated wartime quantity	Unloaded wt (kg)	Notes
	M1 and M1A1 Thompson submachine gun	Submachine gun	Close-quarters, personal security	Blowback, blish lock	United States		Auto-Ordnance Company	.45 ACP	150	700	1921		4.5-4.9	30-round magazine.
	M2 Hyde	Submachine gun	Close-quarters, personal security	Blowback, open bolt	United States		Marlin firearms company	.45 ACP		570	1942	400	4.19	Never issued or saw service. The M2 Hyde was the gap between the M1 Thompson and the M3 grease gun. It was designed to be lighter and cheaper to produce than the Thompson (since the Thompson was an extremely expensive weapon). It succeeded at both goals, but it was almost immediately replaced by the cheaper grease gun. Used 20-round or 30-round Thompson magazines.
	M3 and M3A1 submachine gun	Submachine gun	Close-quarters, personal security	Blowback, open bolt	United States		General Motors	.45 ACP	91	450	1943	655363	3.61-3.70	30-round magazine.
	M50 Reising submachine gun	Submachine gun	Close-quarters, personal security	Blowback (Delayed blowback), closed bolt	United States		Harrington & Richardson	.45 ACP		550	1941		2.8-3.1	
	United Defense M42	Submachine gun	Close-quarters, personal security	Blowback	United States		United Defense Supply Corp.	.45 ACP		700	1942	15000	4.54	25-round box magazine (also issued with two 25-round magazines welded face-to-face)
	M55 Reising submachine gun	Submachine gun	Close-quarters, personal security	Blowback (Delayed blowback), closed bolt	United States		Harrington & Richardson	.45 ACP		550	1941			Identical to the M50 SMG except it sported a wire stock and had no compensator. It also had a slightly shorter barrel. The M50 and M55 served as the go-to SMGs before the Thompson.

=== Rifles ===
Image	Name	Type	Role/s	Action	Origin	Base model/s	Manufacturer/s	Cartridge/s	Effective firing range (m)	From (year)	Estimated wartime quantity	Unloaded weight (kg)	Notes
	M1903 Springfield	Standard rifle	Front-line	Bolt-action	United States	Gewehr 98	Springfield Armory	.30-03; .30-06 Springfield	610	1903	3000000~	3.9	
	M1903A4 sniper rifle	Sniper rifle	Long-Range Precision	Bolt-action	United States	Gewehr 98	Springfield Armory	.30-03; .30-06 Springfield	1000	1942			
	M1 Garand	Battle rifle	Front-line / Assault	Gas-operated, rotating bolt	United States		Springfield Armory, Winchester, Harrington & Richardson, International Harvester	.30-06 Springfield	457	1934		4.31 - 5.3	
	M1917 Enfield rifle	Standard rifle	Front-line	Bolt-action	United States		Winchester, Remington Arms, Eddystone Arsenal	.30-06 Springfield	549	1917		4.167	
	M1941 Johnson rifle	Battle rifle	Front-line / Assault	Recoil-operated (Short-recoil), rotating bolt	United States		Johnson Automatics, Inc.	.30-06 Springfield		1941	70000~	4.31	
	Krag–Jørgensen	Standard rifle	Second-line	Bolt-Action	United States		Springfield Armory	.30-40 Krag		1892		3.82	
	Winchester Model 1895	Standard rifle	Front-line	Lever action	United States		Winchester, Browning Arms	.30-06 Springfield		1895		4.2	
	Winchester Model 70 sniper rifle	Sniper rifle	Long-Range Precision	Bolt-action	United States		Winchester, U.S. Repeating Arms	.30-06 Springfield		1936		2.7 - 3.6	
	Remington Model 8	Battle rifle	Front-line / Assault	Recoil-operated	United States		Remington Arms			1905		3.6	

=== Carbines ===
Image	Name	Type	Role/s	Action	Origin	Base model/s	Manufacturer/s	Cartridge/s	Effective firing range (m)	Cyclic rate of fire (rpm)	From (year)	Estimated wartime quantity	Unloaded wt (kg)	Notes
	M1/M1A1 carbine	Carbine	Front-line / Assault / Close-quarters / Personal Security	Gas-operated (short-stroke piston), rotating bolt	United States		General Motors, Winchester, Irwin-Pedersen, Underwood Elliot Fisher, National Postal Meter, Quality Hardware Manufacturing Corp., International Business Machines, Standard Products, Rock-Ola Manufacturing Corporation, Commercial Controls Corporation	.30 Carbine	275	270	1942	6121309	2.4	15-round box magazines, or 30-round curved magazines. A common practice was to strap two 15-round magazine ammo pouches to the gun stock.
	Marlin Model 1894	Carbine	Close-quarters / Personal Security	Lever action	United States		Marlin Firearms	30-30	137-183	91	1894		2.72 - 2.95	
	Winchester Model 1894	Carbine	Close-quarters / Personal Security	Lever action	United States		Winchester	30-30	137-183	91	1894		3.1	

=== Shotguns ===
- Winchester Model 1912
- Browning Auto-5
- Remington 10
- Remington 31
- Stevens M520-30
- Ithaca 37
- Winchester Model 1897

=== Grenades and grenade launchers ===
- M7 grenade launcher
- M1 frangible grenade
- M1 grenade adapter
- Frangible Grenade M1
- M9 rifle grenade
- Mk 2 grenade
- MK3 grenade
- AN-M8 smoke grenade

=== Mines ===
- M2 mine
- M5 mine
- M7 mine

=== Recoilless rifles ===
- M18 recoilless rifle
- M20 recoilless rifle

=== Flamethrowers ===
- M1A1 flamethrower
- M2-A1 flamethrower
- Ronson flamethrower

== Machine guns ==
=== Infantry and dual ===
- Browning M1917A1 (.30-06)
- Browning M1918A2 (.30-06)
- Browning M1919A4/A6 and family (.30-06)
- M1941 Johnson Light Machine Gun (LMG) (.30-06)
- Browning M2 (.50 BMG)

=== Vehicle and aircraft machine guns and autocannons ===
- 20mm Oerlikon autocannon
- 37mm M1 autocannon
- 40mm Bofors autocannon
- 37mm M4 automatic cannon
- 20mm M2 Hispano autocannon
- Browning M2
- M1919A4 Browning machine gun
- M1917 HMG AA configuration

== Tanks ==
=== Light tanks ===
- M2 Light tank
- M3 Stuart
- M5 Stuart
- M22 Locust
- M24 Chaffee
- LVT-1 alligator (and variants)

=== Medium tanks ===
- M2 Medium Tank
- M3 Lee
- M4 Sherman (and variants)

=== Heavy tanks ===
- M26 Pershing
- T26E4 Super Pershing
- M6 (Prototype)
- T28 (Prototype)
- T29 (Prototype)
- T30 (Prototype)
- T32 (Prototype)
- T34 (Prototype)

=== Tank destroyers ===
- M10 Wolverine
- M18 Hellcat
- M36 Jackson

=== Flamethrower tanks ===
- M5 Satan
- Sherman Zippo

== Other vehicles ==
=== Passenger vehicles ===
- Dodge WC series
- Willys MB

=== Motorcycles ===
- Harley-Davidson WLA

=== Amphibious vehicles ===
- Landing Vehicle Tracked
- M29 Weasel
- DUKW

=== Trucks ===
- GMC CCKW 2½-ton 6×6 truck
- Studebaker US6

== Artillery ==
=== Infantry Guns ===
- Canon d'Infanterie de 37 modèle 1916 TRP
- T32 Infantry Gun

=== Infantry mortars ===
- M1 mortar
- M2 4.2-inch mortar
- M2 mortar

=== Heavy mortars and multiple rocket launchers ===
- T34 Calliope
- T40 Whizbang

=== Self-propelled guns ===
- Howitzer motor carriage M8
- M40 gun motor carriage
- M7 Priest

=== Field artillery ===
- 75 mm gun M1917 – copy of British gun re-chambered for French cartridge, produced for export
- QF 2.95-inch mountain gun – imported from Britain, used in Philippines
- 75 mm gun M2/M3/M6
- M116 howitzer (75 mm) – also known as "75mm Pack Howitzer M1"
- 76 mm gun M1
- M101 howitzer (105mm) – still used in US and worldwide as late as in 2014
- M3 howitzer (105mm)
- Canon de 155mm GPF
- M114 155 mm howitzer – also known as M1 155 mm Howitzer
- M2 155 mm field gun (Long Tom)
  - 4.5-inch gun M1 – version to fire British ammunition
- M115 203 mm howitzer
- 8-inch gun M1
- M1 240 mm howitzer

=== Fortress and siege guns ===
- 5"/51 caliber gun (coastal defense)
- 8-inch M1888 (obsolete)
  - 8-inch Mk. VI railway gun
- M1918 240 mm howitzer (obsolete)
- 8-inch Mk. VI railway gun
- 12-inch coast defense mortar (also railway version)
- 12-inch gun M1895
- 14-inch M1920 railway gun
- 16"/50 caliber M1919 gun

=== Anti-tank guns ===
- National Forge & Ordnance 37mm gun (1941) - export (to Dutch) only
- M3 37 mm anti-tank gun
- M1 57 mm anti-tank gun
- M5 3-inch anti-tank gun
- 105 mm gun T8 AT/AA gun (cancelled)

== Anti-tank infantry weapons ==
- M1 Bazooka
- M1A1 Bazooka
- M9 Bazooka
- M20 Super Bazooka (prototype)
- Boys anti-tank rifle
- M18 recoilless rifle
- M20 recoilless rifle
- M22 dodge rifle

== See also ==
- List of U.S. Army weapons by supply catalog designation
- List of individual weapons of the U.S. Armed Forces
- List of crew-served weapons of the U.S. Armed Forces
- List of vehicles of the U.S. Armed Forces
- List of World War II weapons

== Bibliography ==
- Hogg, Ian V. (1998). Allied Artillery of World War Two. Marlborough, UK: Crowood Press. ISBN 1-86126-165-9.
