= 105 mm gun T5 =

105mm L/65 T5
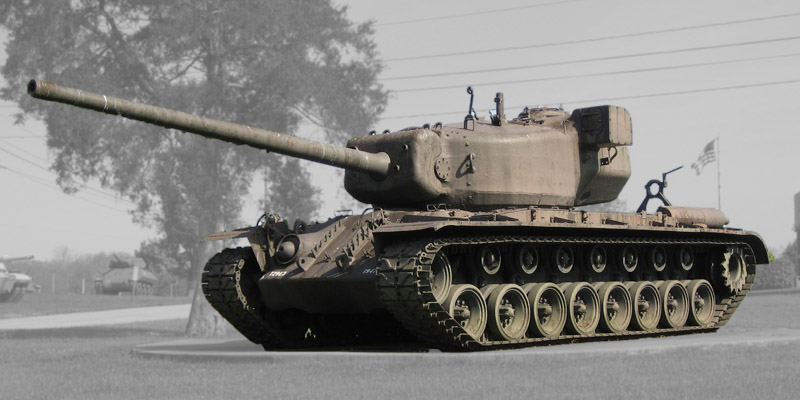
- The T5E1 as mounted on the T29E3 heavy tank
- Type: Tank gun
- Place of origin: United States

Service history
- Used by: United States

Production history
- Produced: 1940s
- Variants: T5E1, T5E2

Specifications
- Mass: 2,383.63 kg (5,255.0 lb)
- Length: 7.53 m (24 ft 8 in)
- Barrel length: 6.83 m (22 ft 5 in) (L/65)
- Caliber: 105 mm (4.1 in)
- Rate of fire: 6 rpm
- Muzzle velocity: 914 m/s (3,000 ft/s)
- Maximum firing range: 1,829 m (2,000 yd) estimated

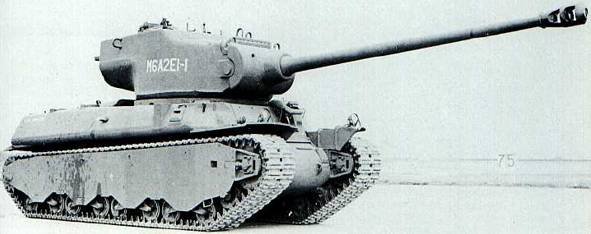
The T5E1 was mounted on the M6A2E1 heavy tank for testing purposes

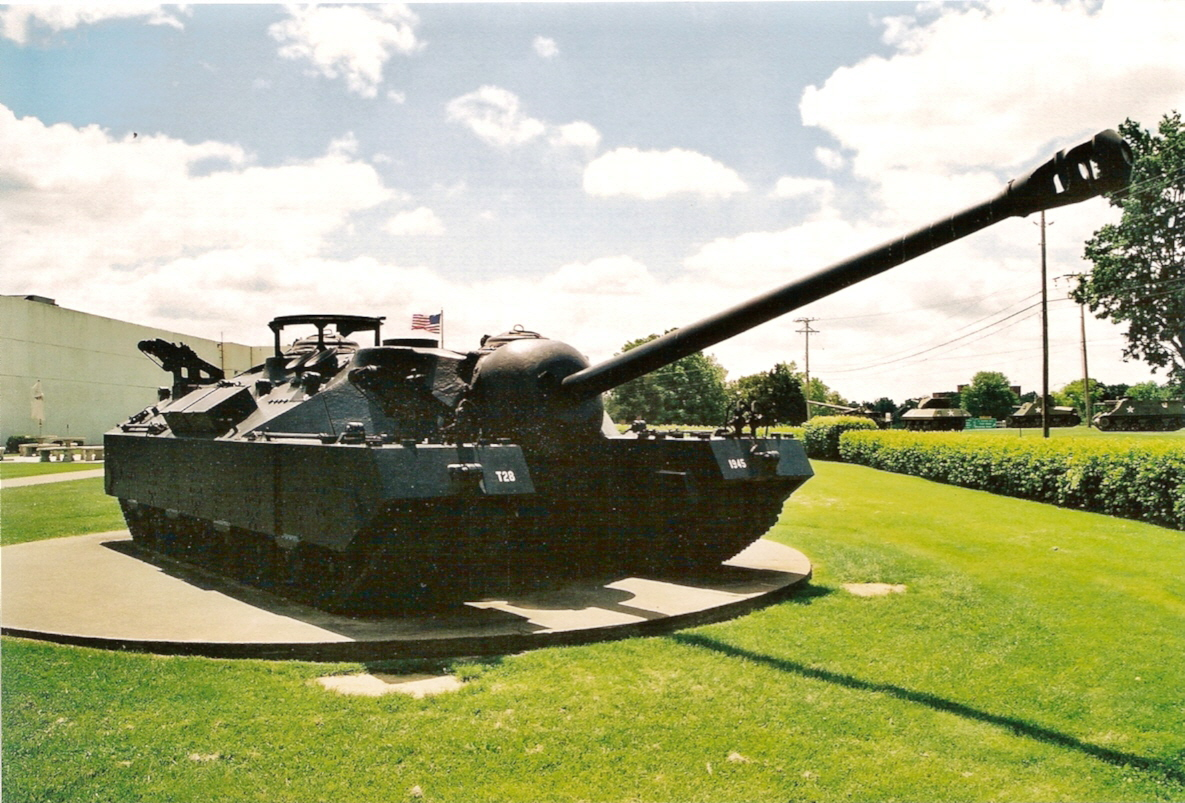
The T5E1 as mounted on the T28 super-heavy tank

The 105mm L/65 T5 was an American rifled anti-tank gun developed in 1945. The T5E1 was the main armament for several American WWII heavy tanks designs, including the double-tracked T28 super-heavy tank and T29 heavy tank.

== Development ==
The project to develop a tank gun of 105 mm (4.1 in) in caliber was first started during WWII in order to compete with increasing heavily armored German tanks. After the invasion of Europe, the Ordnance Department believed there would be a need for heavily armored tanks equipped with powerful armament to break through fortified areas. They proposed that existing M6 heavy tank prototypes be up-armored and mount the new 105mm T5E1. These modified T1E1s with the T5E1 gun in enlarged turrets (taken from the proposed T29 project) were designated M6A2E1. The M6A2E1 project did not proceed when Eisenhower rejected its use in Europe on August 18, 1944, but two M6A2E1s – without the increased armor – were used to test the armament and gun for the upcoming T29 heavy tank.

The first models of the T29 heavy tank delivered mounted the T5E1. It was mounted in a large cast turret featuring a thick mantlet. With the passage of OCM 28848, the program changed to a postwar developmental study consisting of only eight tanks. The T29E1 and T29E3 series maintained the T5E1 during testing. Models T29 and T29E2 were equipped with the T5E2 gun. This was due to the smaller space available in the turret after the addition of a hydraulic power traverse and elevation mechanism developed from MIT that was tested on these models.

The 105mm T5E1 was also used in the T28 super-heavy tank (briefly renamed 105 mm gun motor carriage T95). In 1943 it was determined that there would soon be a need for a heavily armored and armed breakthrough tank. The turretless T28 was developed to meet these specifications. The T5E1 in the T28 was mounted in the hull of the tank with traverse limited to 10 degrees to the left and right of center, 15 degrees of elevation, and 5 degrees of depression. Two T28s were built, and both were armed with T5E1 guns. The T28 project was canceled in late 1947, bringing the end of the T5E1 being mounted in that tank.

With the cancellation of the T28 super-heavy tank and T29 heavy tank projects in the late 1940s, work on the 105mm T5E1 and 105mm T5E2 was stopped before the gun ever fully completed trials.

== Performance ==
The T5E1 used two-part separated ammunition like the 155 mm T7 gun used on the T30 heavy tank. It had a high velocity of 914 m/s (3,000 ft/s), comparable to the 120 mm T53 on the T34 heavy tank, which had a muzzle velocity of 945 m/s (3,100 ft/s). The T5E1 had significantly better armor penetration characteristics than the 155 mm T7 mounted on the T30 heavy tank, which had a muzzle velocity of only 701 m/s (2,300 ft/s).

The T5E1 had a variety of shells available, including the AP-T T32 (APCBC-T), HVAP-T T29E3 (APCR-T), and HE T30E1 (HE). At 914 m (1,000yd) the AP-T T32 shot could penetrate 177 mm (7.0 in) of rolled homogeneous armor (RHA) at a 30-degree angle, and 84 mm (3.3 in) of RHA at a 60-degree angle.

== Variants ==
- T5E1 – Model using mount T123, with three recoil cylinders on top of the gun cradle
- T5E2 – Model modified to use mount T123E1 and T123E2, with two recoil cylinders on top of the gun cradle and one on the bottom

== Bibliography ==
Hunnicutt, Richard Pearce (1988). Firepower: A History of the American Heavy Tank. Novato, California: Presidio Press. ISBN 0-89141-304-9.
