= T28 super-heavy tank =

Coordinates: 32°22′31.8″N 84°50′45.4″W

Super-heavy tank T28 105 mm gun motor carriage T95
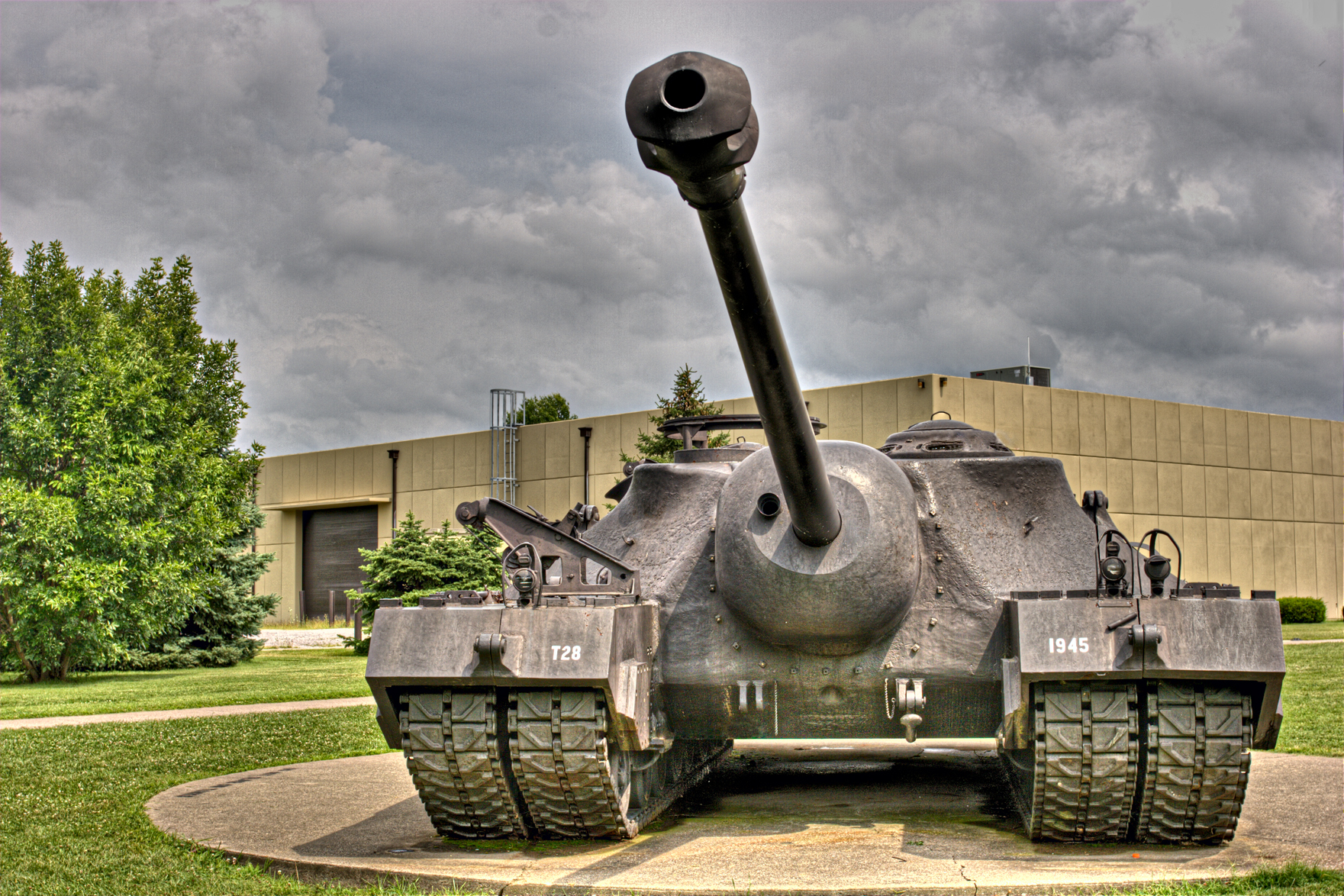
- Type: Super-heavy tank, assault gun
- Place of origin: United States

Service history
- Used by: United States

Production history
- Manufacturer: Pacific Car and Foundry
- Produced: 1945
- No. built: 2

Specifications
- Mass: 95 short tons (85 long tons; 86 t)
- Length: 36 ft 6 in (11.1 m)
- Width: 14 ft 10 in (4.52 m)
- Height: 9 ft 4 in (2.84 m)
- Crew: 4
- Armor: 12 in (305 mm)
- Main armament: 105 mm T5E1 gun, with 62 rounds
- Secondary armament: .50 cal (12.7 mm) Browning heavy machine gun, with 660 rounds
- Engine: Ford GAF V-8 gasoline 500 hp (372 kW)
- Power/weight: 5.8 hp/tonne
- Suspension: double tracks, horizontal volute spring
- Operational range: 100 miles (160 km)
- Maximum speed: 8 mph (13 km/h)

The T28 super-heavy tank was an American super-heavy tank/assault gun designed for the United States Army during World War II. It was originally designed to break through German defenses of the Siegfried Line and was later considered as a possible participant in the planned invasion of the Japanese mainland.

The near 100-ton vehicle was initially designated a heavy tank. It was re-designated as the 105 mm Gun Motor Carriage T95 in 1945, and then renamed in 1946 as the Super Heavy Tank T28.

Only two prototypes were built before the project was terminated.

== Name ==
Initially named Heavy Tank T28 when construction was authorized in 1944, the design did not fit in the usual categories of vehicles, leading to reclassification. As it did not have its armament in a revolving turret, the Ordnance Department requested a name change to 105 mm Gun Motor Carriage T95, the change becoming official in March 1945. However, due to its heavy armor and armament—while self-propelled guns in United States service were lightly armored—it was renamed Super Heavy Tank T28 in June 1946 by OCM 37058.

== Development ==
The T28/T95 was designed to be used for attacking the heavy defenses expected of the Siegfried Line along the western borders of Germany. The 105 mm T5E1 gun selected was known to have very good performance against concrete and "expected to be extremely effective at reducing heavy fortifications". By the time the vehicle passed trials, the German Siegfried Line had already been infiltrated and overwhelmed by the Allied forces. As a result, the T28 never left the United States, with the vehicle instead serving as an engineering study and load test vehicle at Aberdeen Proving Ground.

The need for an assault tank was first identified in 1943, with the Ordnance Department proposing that 25 vehicles could be ready for operations. A conference in March 1944 between the Ordnance Department and Army Ground Forces resulted in agreement to build five. The Pacific Car and Foundry Company were supplied with the design in March 1945, completed final design and had the first hull welded by August. By the time the first tank was completed and ready for combat, the war was over. The plan for five was reduced to two.

As it did not have a turret, but a fixed casemate mount instead for its main armament (as German Jagdpanzers and Soviet Samokhodnaya Ustanovka-designation combat vehicles did), and the 105 mm gun fitted could only elevate from 19.5° to −5° and traverse from 10° right to 11° left of the centerline, the T28 more closely resembled an assault gun, and was redesignated as "T95 gun motor carriage" in 1945, but in June 1946, the vehicle was redesignated again as "super heavy tank T28".

Two prototypes of the T28 were built. They underwent evaluation at the Aberdeen Proving Ground and Fort Knox facilities until 1947. In 1947, one of the T28s was heavily damaged by an engine fire during trials at Yuma Proving Ground and was broken up and sold for scrap. The T28 never went into service due to the obsolete design, high maintenance costs, and the heavy weight, which made transportation overseas difficult, but was retained to test the "durability of components on such a heavy vehicle". Work on it ended before completion as the War Department decided to stop the development of vehicles of that sort of weight and the T28 program terminated in October 1947. By that point, the T29 and T30 turreted heavy tank designs had been built. The T29 mounted the same gun as the T28 in a conventional rotating turret. The T30 was developed with a larger-caliber gun and more powerful engine. The T29 program was used to test mechanical components for future tank designs.

== Design ==
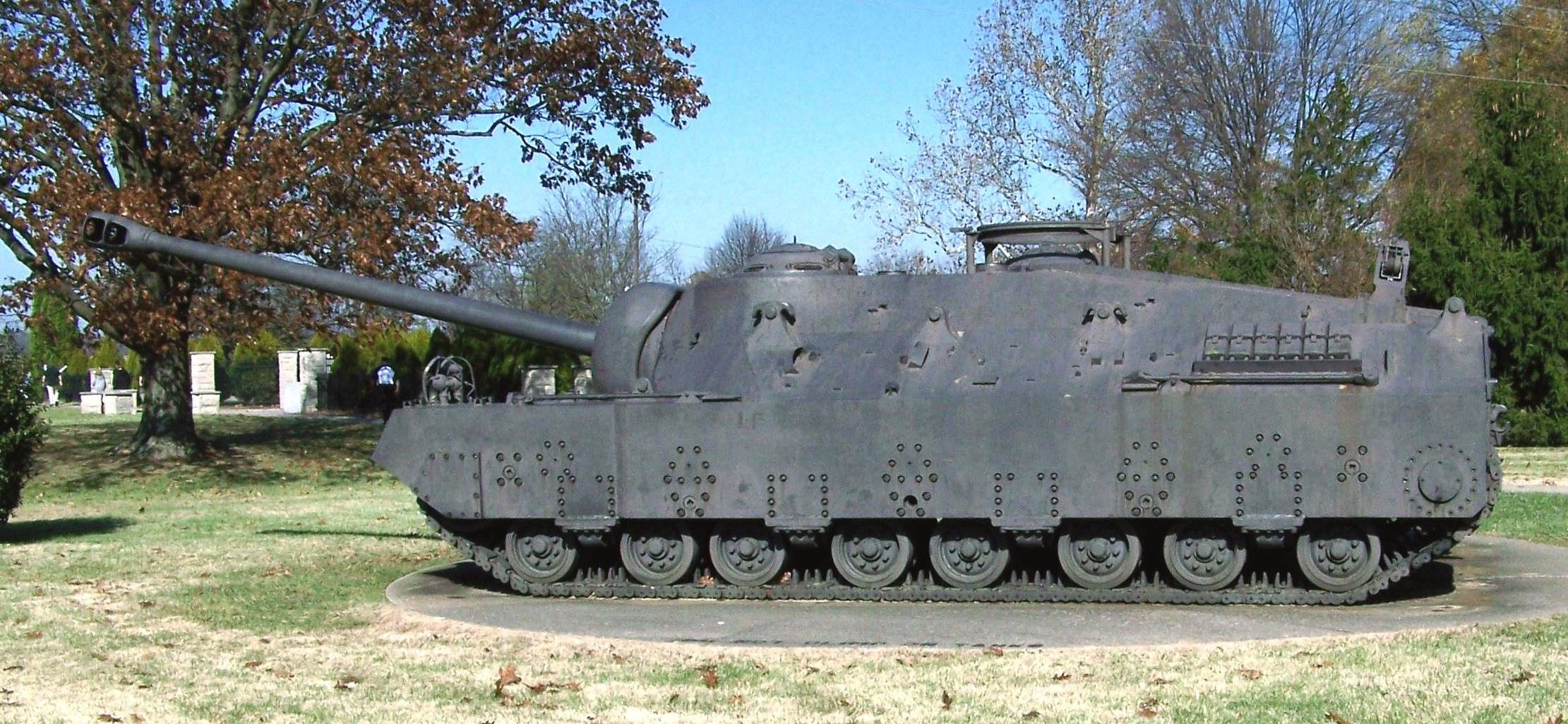
Side view

The original plan was to build five prototype vehicles, with a production total of 25. Its total weight when fully equipped would have reached 95 tons (86 tonnes). To lower ground pressure, instead of two tracks, it used four tracks that projected forward of the hull, each 20 inches (495 mm) wide. The track assemblies consisted of a horizontal volute suspension systems or also considered HVSS. The outer tracks could be detached within two hours for rail transport: After removal, they could be fixed together to make a unit that could be towed behind the tank. Due to its extreme weight and low engine power, the T28 had extremely limited obstacle-crossing ability and could not cross any of the portable bridges available at the time, and so was considered impractical in the field and not suitable for production.

Reassembly of the T28 super-heavy tank at Fort Benning, Georgia

The T28 had no conventional turret, with a casemate style hull instead, giving it a comparatively low profile, as the later examples of the fully enclosed Jagdpanzer-family of German tank destroyers, not entirely dissimilar to the 50 short-ton weight German Jagdpanther. Its main armament was a 105 mm T5E1 gun in a ball-shaped gun mantlet set into the vertical hull front. The traverse was limited to 10° right and 11° left, and elevation from 19.5° to −5°. When traveling, the gun was locked at the maximum elevation. The only other armament was a .50 cal. (12.7 mm) M2 Browning machine gun on a ring mount above the commander's hatch for anti-aircraft use. The main gun—65 calibres long—had a muzzle velocity of 3,700 feet per second (1,130 m/s), with a range of up to 12 miles (19 km). The main gun could only be loaded at 4 rounds per minute due to the rounds being manually loaded.

The armor was very thick compared to other tanks of the time, up to 12 inches (305 mm) thick on the front. This was considered heavy enough to provide protection from the German 88 mm gun used as tank and anti-tank guns. The ball-shaped gun mantle had a thickness of 11.5 inches. The lower hull front had 5.25 in (130 mm) of armor, and the sides 2.5 in (64 mm).The suspension system and lower hull were covered with 4-in (100 mm) thick steel skirts.

The engine was a gasoline-powered Ford GAF V-8, delivering 500 hp, at 2600 rpm through the Torqmatic transmission; which left the vehicle underpowered, geared down to a top speed of about 8 mph (13 km/h) and greatly limited its obstacle-climbing capability. The vehicle is capable of climbing a slope grade of 60%, traversing over walls up to 24 inches, and has a fording depth to 47 inches. The vehicle contains 4 gasoline fuel tanks holding a total of 400 gallons and this allowed the vehicle to travel 100 miles of range. Although the vehicle was originally to feature the electric transmission of the Medium Tank T23, this was later changed to the mechanical transmission of the Medium Tank T26 due to the unreliability of the system.

The crew consisted of 4 members which included a driver, gunner, loader, and commander. The driver was positioned to the left of the gun with the loader behind, and the gunner was located to the right of the gun with the commander behind. There were only two vision cupolas which were designated for the driver and the commander, and the commanders cupola had access to the .50 cal. machine gun. For vision the vehicle included 2 type M6 periscopes and another being a type M10E3, and one telescope being a M8A1 type T at 3X magnification. The gunner has a periscope and the telescope for vision and the loader also has a periscope for vision.

== Surviving vehicle ==
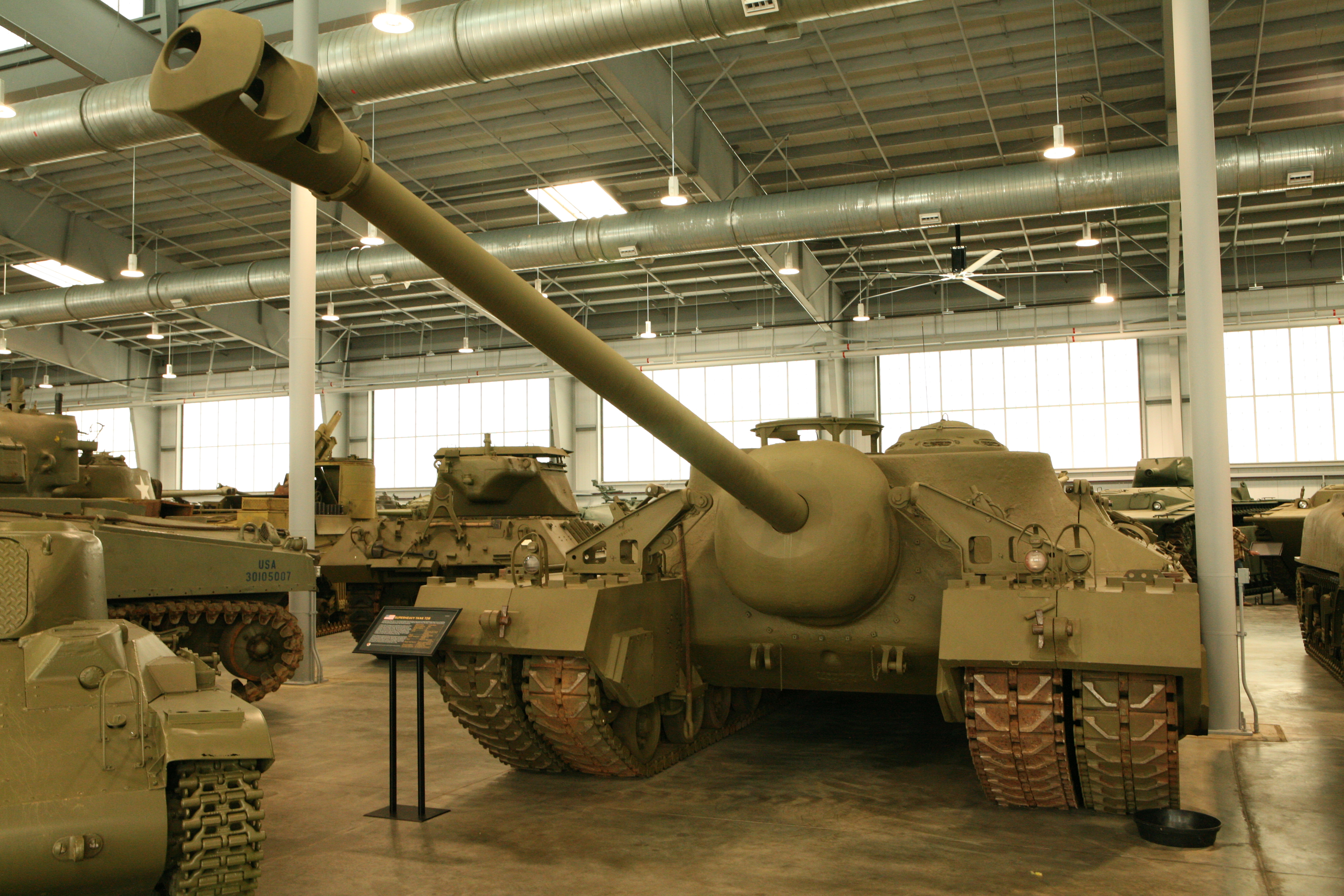
Surviving example at the U.S. Army Armor & Cavalry Collection

In 1974, the last prototype was discovered abandoned in a field at Fort Belvoir, Virginia. Camouflaged in the middle of some bushes, it is unknown where it spent the intervening 27 years. It is the sole remaining example of these tanks and was exhibited at the Patton Museum of Cavalry and Armor in Kentucky. In 2011, it was shipped to its new home at U.S. Army Armor & Cavalry Collection, Fort Benning, Georgia. It was placed in the new Patton Park, which is a plot of 30 acres where nine of the tanks being stored at Fort Benning are now displayed. The vehicle was damaged in January 2017 during transit to another facility for external refurbishment when it broke loose from the M1070 HET carrying it. The transporter failed to negotiate a downhill slope and subsequent turn at a safe speed, causing the securing chains to break and allowing the T28 to slide off the trailer. Despite then rolling into a ditch, only minor repairable damage was sustained to two bogies. The outer track units had been removed.

== Photos ==
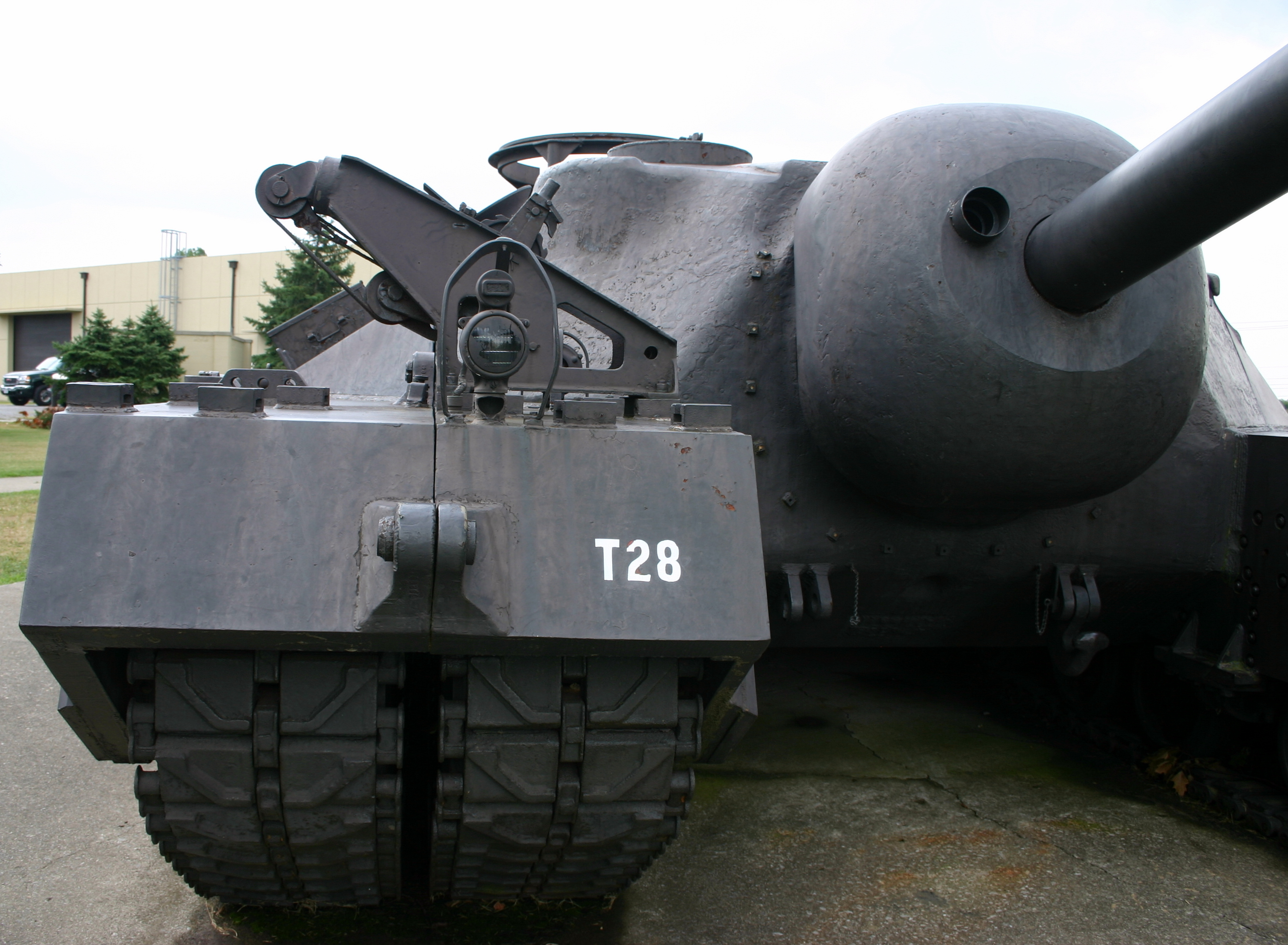
Closeup showing the double tracks

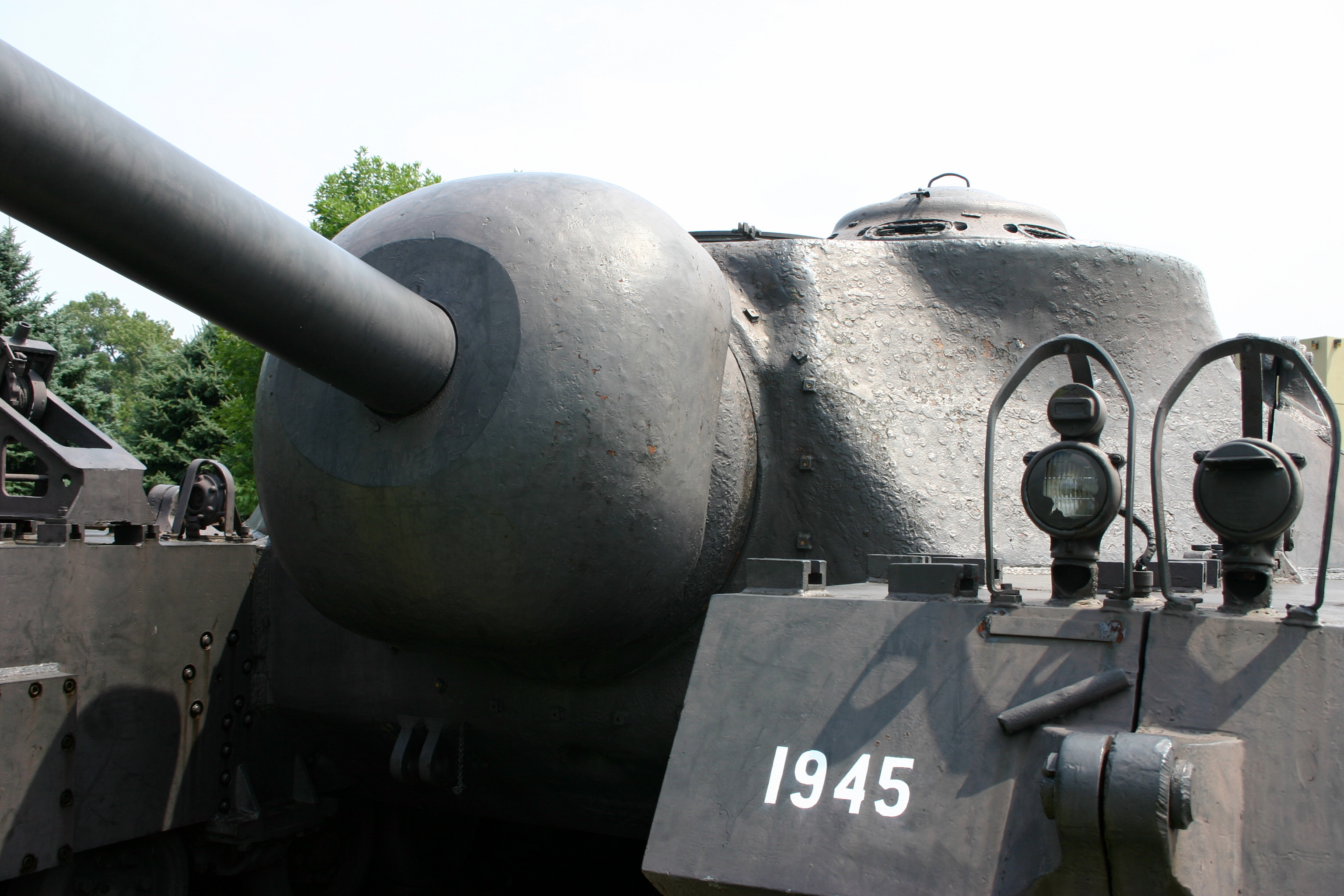
Gun mantlet

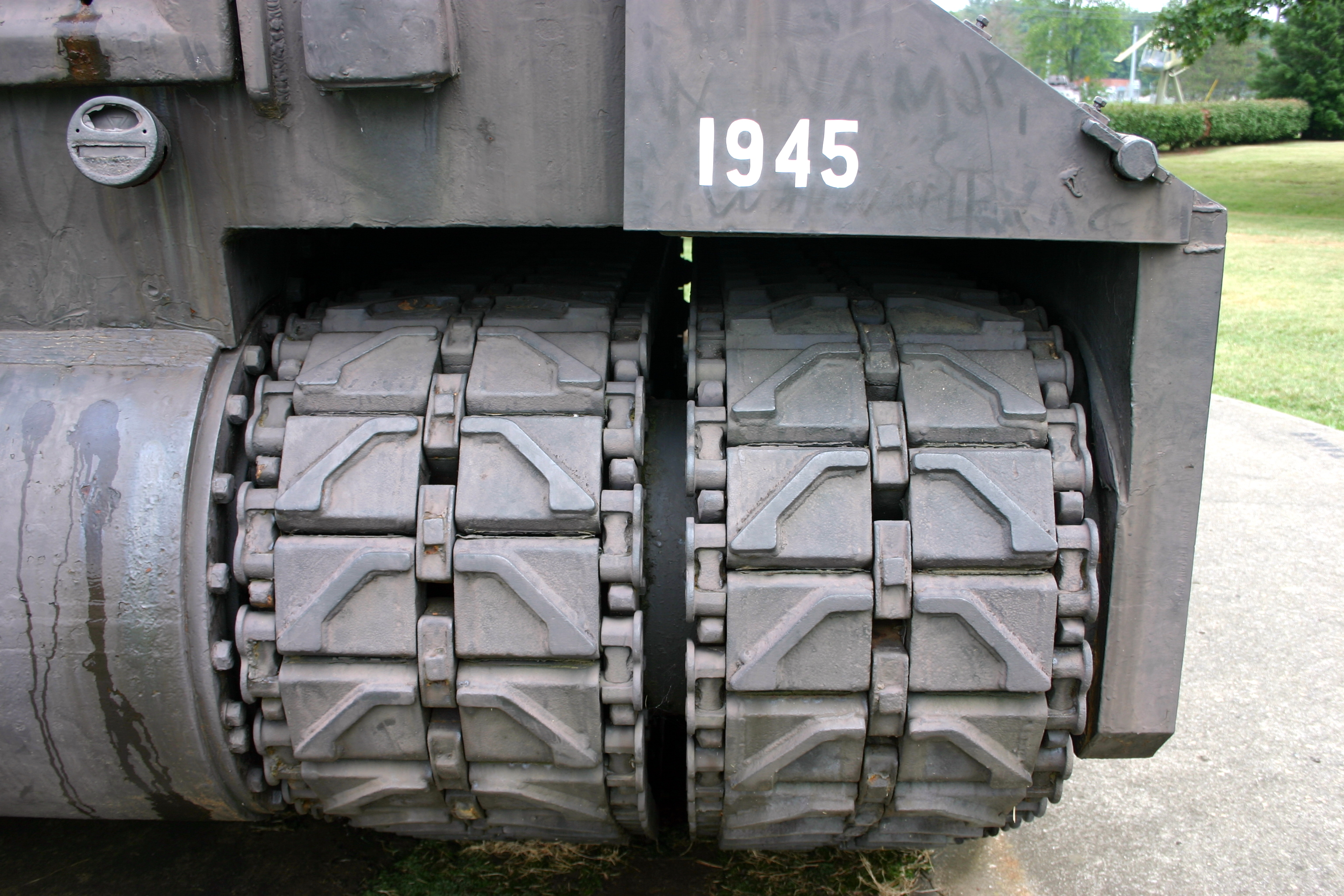
Closeup showing the double tracks

== See also ==
- List of U.S. military vehicles by model number
- Tank classification
- Jagdtiger – a comparable German vehicle for anti-tank use. Entered limited production.
- Tortoise heavy assault tank – a comparable British vehicle for attacking fortifications; only six built.
- SU-100Y Self-Propelled Gun - a comparable Soviet vehicle for attacking fortified bunkers; only one built.

== Bibliography ==
- Hunnicutt, Richard Pearce (1988). Firepower: A History of the American Heavy Tank. Novato, California: Presidio Press. ISBN 0-89141-304-9.
