= 155 mm gun T7 =

155mm L/40 T7
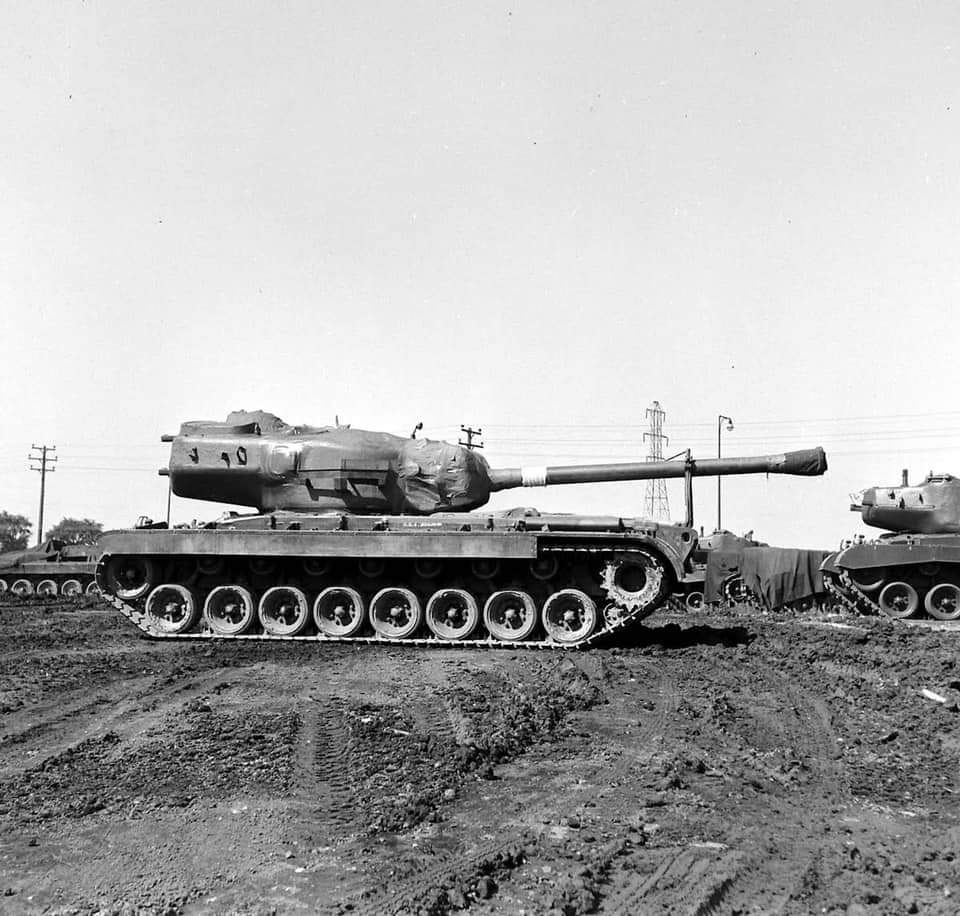
- T30 Heavy tank in Detroit Tank Arsenal, July 1950
- Type: Tank gun
- Place of origin: United States

Service history
- Used by: United States

Production history
- Produced: 1940s
- Variants: T7, T7E1

Specifications
- Mass: 2,384 kg (5,256 lb)
- Length: 6.64 m (21 ft 9 in)
- Barrel length: 6.4276 m (21 ft 1.06 in) (L/41.4)
- Cartridge: 155 × 775mmR
- Cartridge weight: M107 HE: 94.99 lb (43.09 kg) projectile, 134.90 lb (61.19 kg) complete; M112B1 APBC-HE: 100.00 lb (45.36 kg) projectile, 139.90 lb (63.46 kg) complete; T29E1 APCBC-HE: 100.00 lb (45.36 kg) projectile, 139.90 lb (63.46 kg) complete; T43 (Mod.) AP:85.21 lb (38.65 kg) projectile, 125.11 lb (56.75 kg) complete; T35E1 HVAP:57.18 lb (25.94 kg) projectile, 97.09 lb (44.04 kg) complete
- Caliber: 155 mm (6.1 in)
- Rate of fire: 3 rpm
- Muzzle velocity: M107 HE: 2,352 ft/s (717 m/s); M112B1 APBC T29E1 APCBC: 2,198 ft/s (670 m/s); T43 (Mod.) AP: 2,533 ft/s (772 m/s); T35E1 HVAP: 3,630 ft/s (1,110 m/s)
- Maximum firing range: Project cancelled before maximum range tests occurred

The 155mm L/40 T7 was an American rifled tank gun developed in 1945. The T7 was to be the main armament for the T30 Heavy Tank, but only a handful were produced due to the T30 project being cancelled after trials in the late 1940s.

The T7 used two-part separated ammunition like the 105mm T5E1 gun on the T29 Heavy Tank. It had a low velocity of only 701 m/s (2,300 ft/s) compared to the 120mm T53 on the T34 Heavy Tank (945 m/s) and the 105mm T5E1 on the T29 Heavy Tank (945 m/s). However, the 43 kg (95 lbs) High-Explosive shell (HE) and high-velocity armour-piercing (HVAP) rounds were demonstrated to have a powerful demolition effect. Testing concluded before completion when the T30 project was cancelled in the late 1940s.

== Ammunition ==
=== Development ===
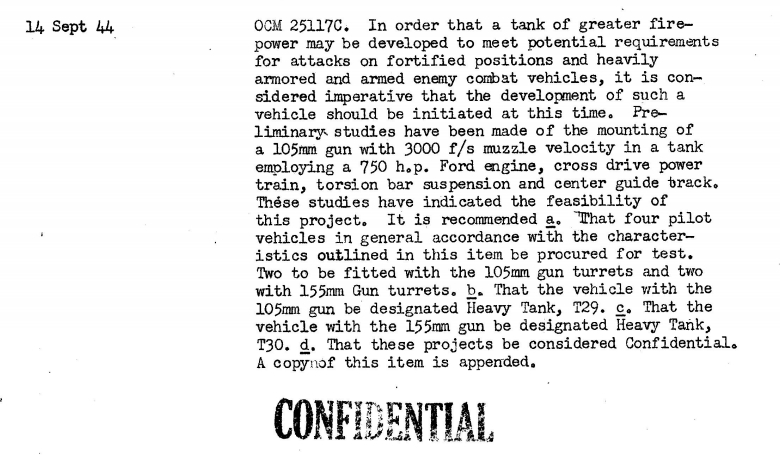
Document Approval of the design of the 155 mm T7 gun September 14, 1944

The 155 mm T7 L/40 (41.4 Caliber) is a 155 mm gun of the T30 heavy tank, developed from a shortened 155 mm M1 L/45 “Long Tom”, conceived as early as 14 September 1944. It was developed alongside the T29 heavy tank armed with 105 mm T5E1 L/65 gun. The T30 had up to 5 different ammunitions available for use. Starting from M107 HE, M110 WP, M112B1 APBC-HE, T29E1 APCBC-HE, and finally T35E1 HVAP (also known as APCR). The specification will be listed as fired from the T7.

=== HE M107 ===
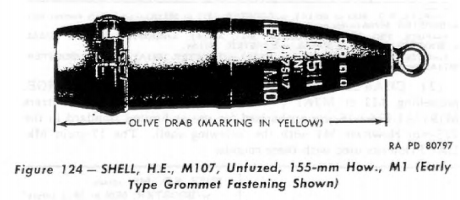
155mm M107 HE Shell

A standard high explosive shell used on all American 155 mm guns in WWII. Weighing 95 lb (43.09 kg), with an explosive filler of 15.13 lb (6.86 kg) TNT, this was primarily used as anti-fortification round, and would have been the primary round used by the T30 Heavy Tank.

- Specification:
- Weight: 94.99 lb (43.09 kg)
- Muzzle velocity: 2,352 ft/s (717 m/s)
- Explosive type: TNT
- Explosive weight: 15.10 lb (6.85 kg)
- Fuze: P.D. M51A4

=== APBC-HE M112B1 ===
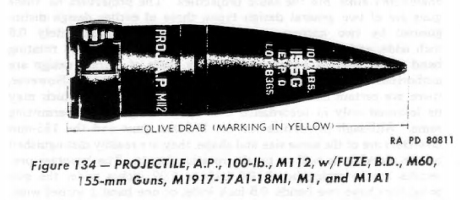
155mm M112B1 APBC-HE Shell

An armor-piercing round. Weighing 100.00 lb (45.36 kg), with an explosive filler of 1.44 lb (0.65 kg)) Explosive D, it was used as an anti-concrete shell, or as an anti-tank in secondary tank destroyer role. The difference between M112 and M112B1 is the cap. Performance-wise, both are identical. V50 penetration table on various AP projectiles tested by the Americans from the Canadian AFV Technical Situation Report No. 34, showing some well-known shell in service during WWII, including the 90 mm T33, 155 mm T7 gun fired 100.00 lb (45.36 kg) AP M112B1 at 2,200 ft/s (670 m/s) can penetrate a homogeneous armor plate, at only 228 mm penetration from point blank against vertical armor.

- Specification:
- Weight: 100.00 lb (45.36 kg)
- Muzzle velocity: 2,200 ft/s (670 m/s)
- Explosive type: Explosive D
- Explosive weight: 1.44 lb (0.65 kg)
- Fuze: B.D. M60

=== APCBC-HE T29E1 ===
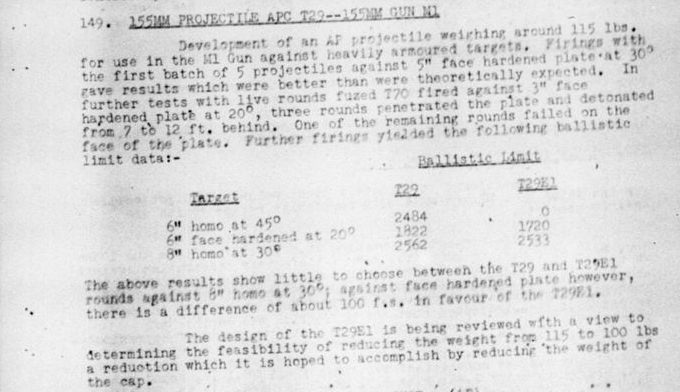
Documents T29E1 shells for 155mm T7

The ballistic limit given is 2,533 ft/s (772 m/s) against 203 mm at 30° from vertical, measuring the 30° point blank penetration from given ballistic limit results 200 mm. With APCBC slope multiplier against vertical armor, that would mean about 284 mm from point blank range, substantially higher compared to the M112B1.

- Specification:
- Weight: 100.00 lb (45.36 kg)
- Muzzle velocity: 2,533 ft/s (772 m/s)
- Explosive type: Explosive D
- Explosive weight: 1.44 lb (0.65 kg)
- Fuze: B.D. T70

=== HVAP-T T35 ===
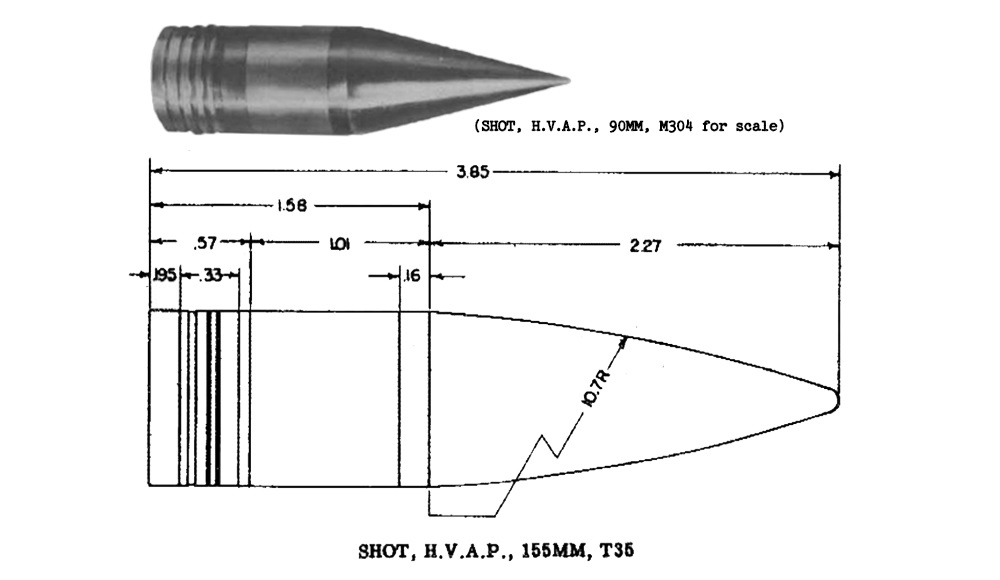
The 155 mm T35 HVAP, and 90 mm M304 for scale

This was the largest APCR projectile to be developed for a tank gun in WWII. Designated as Shot, H.V.A.P., 155MM, T35E1, or just simply called as T35E1 HVAP. With the growing concern of encountering enemy heavy armor like the King Tiger or Jagdtiger, the U.S. Army Ground Forces was pressed to develop a necessary anti-tank munition for their latest heavy tanks in development, the T29 and T30. These tanks were intended to support allied forces with combined heavy armor and heavy firepower to defeat the most well-fortified enemy positions with different roles. The T29 would be used primarily to combat other tanks with its higher-velocity 105 mm gun, while the T30 would be relegated to anti-fortification work with the T7 gun, for which no armor-penetrating round was yet available. Thus, a new anti-tank munition was developed. To quote the Office Memorandum from the U.S. Office of Research and Development about the T30 Heavy Tank project (8 February 1945):

“While the 155mm gun in the T30 is intended to deliver maximum effective HE fire, a new HVAP projectile, T35, having a muzzle velocity of 3,630 ft/s (1,110 m/s), has been designed for this gun. This projectile will penetrate 9″ of homogeneous armor at 30° obliquity at a range of 2000 yards. This tank is a companion vehicle to the hole-punching, heavy Tank T29, and is deemed essential in order to keep pace with enemy tank developments.”

Structurally, its design was similar to the 90 mm M304 HVAP with multi-piece carrier construction, consisting of aluminium body fitted with a steel bourrelet ring, an aluminium windshield, and a steel base fitted with a copper driving band and trace. The armor-piercing core contained 14.9 lb (6.8 kg)) of tungsten carbide, with an estimated core diameter of 60 mm. The core alone was nearly the same weight as a complete solid steel 76 mm M79 AP projectile, and gave the T35 round well over double the M79's penetration. The total weight of the entire projectile including the penetrator was 57.18 lb (25.94 kg). Test firing was done using the T7 gun firing at full charge with a muzzle velocity of 3,630 ft/s (1,110 m/s). Its penetration was quite high, 392 mm versus RHA at 0° from point-blank. By comparison, the 105 mm T29E3 HVAP round of the T29 was capable of penetrating up to 379 mm of RHA, when tested with a similar configuration.

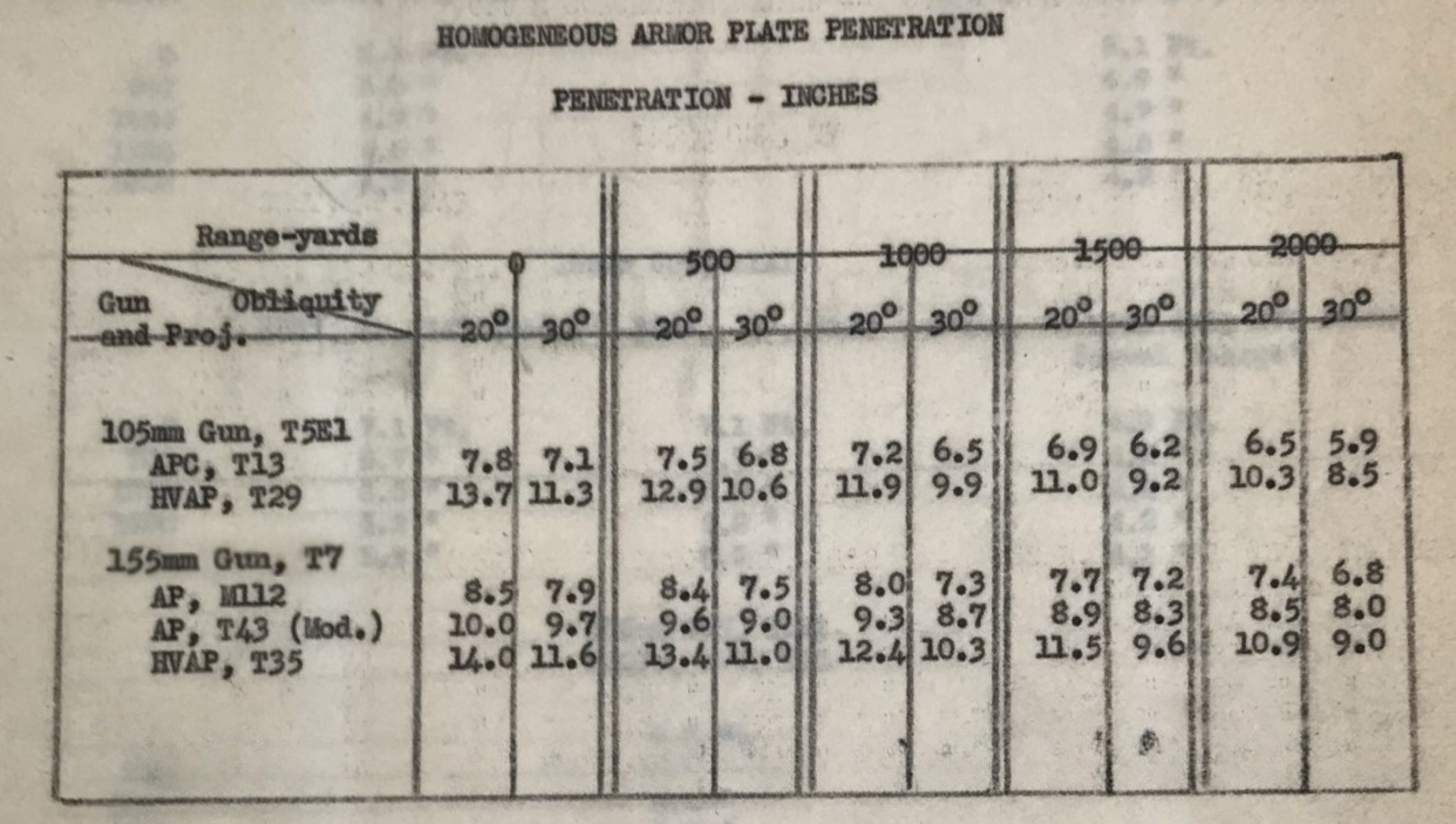
Estimated penetration table for the new anti-tank projectiles.

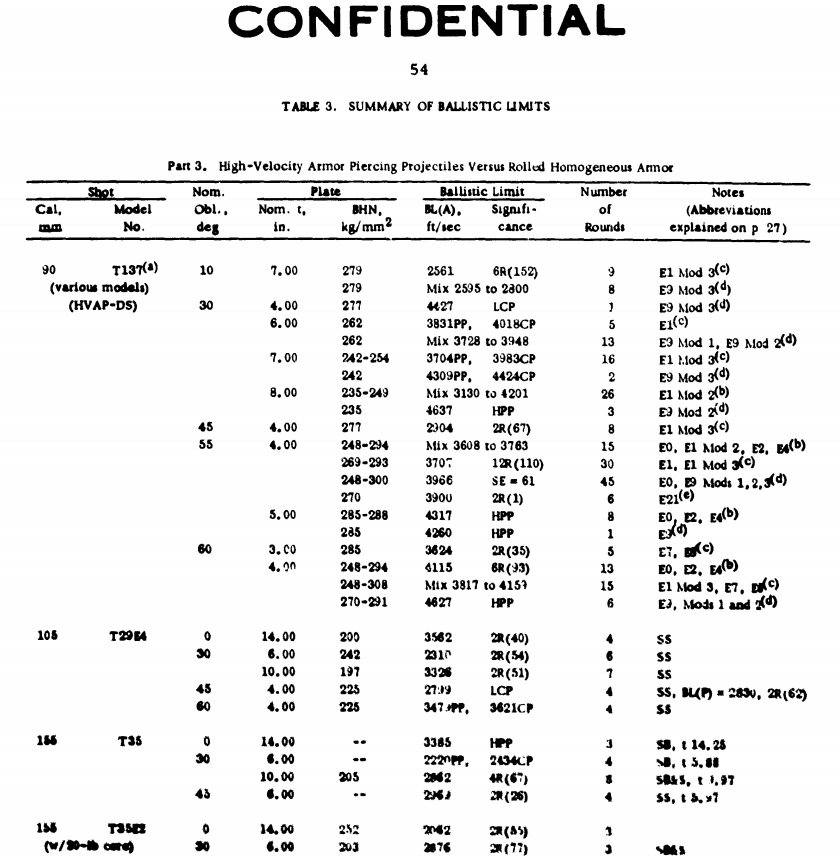
Documents reporting values from T7 and T5E1 guns

The 155 mm T7 was largely intended for bunker busting and demolition, and chronic supply shortages of tungsten meant that even if the T30 had gone into serial production, the HVAP round would likely have been in short supply--every 155mm core used almost as much tungsten carbide as four 76mm HVAP cores, and the latter was desperately needed in Europe by vehicles equipped with the 76 mm gun (like the M18 Hellcat). The end of hostilities in both Europe and the Pacific effectively terminated the project, along with the T30 Heavy Tank, as the tank's big gun and heavy armor were no longer needed to counter German armor and fortifications.

- Specification:
- Weight: 57.18 lb (25.94 kg)
- Muzzle velocity: 3,630 ft/s (1,110 m/s)
- Core diameter: 60 mm (est.)
- Core mass: 14.9 lb (6.8 kg)
- Core type: Tungsten carbide

=== M110 WP (Smoke) ===
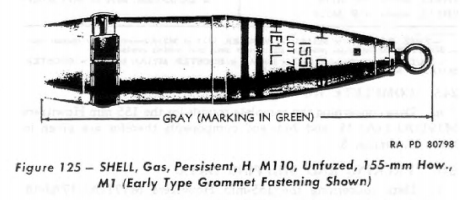
155mm M110 Smoke For the T30 heavy tank

Smoke shell, used to provide smoke screen with 15.58 lb (7.07 kg) of white phosphorus. The ballistics and configuration are similar as the M107 HE.

- Specification:
- Weight: 98.39 lb (44.63 kg)
- Muzzle velocity: 2,352 ft/s (717 m/s)
- Smoke type: WP
- Smoke weight: 15.58 lb (7.07 kg)
- Fuze: P.D. M51A4

== Penetration comparison ==
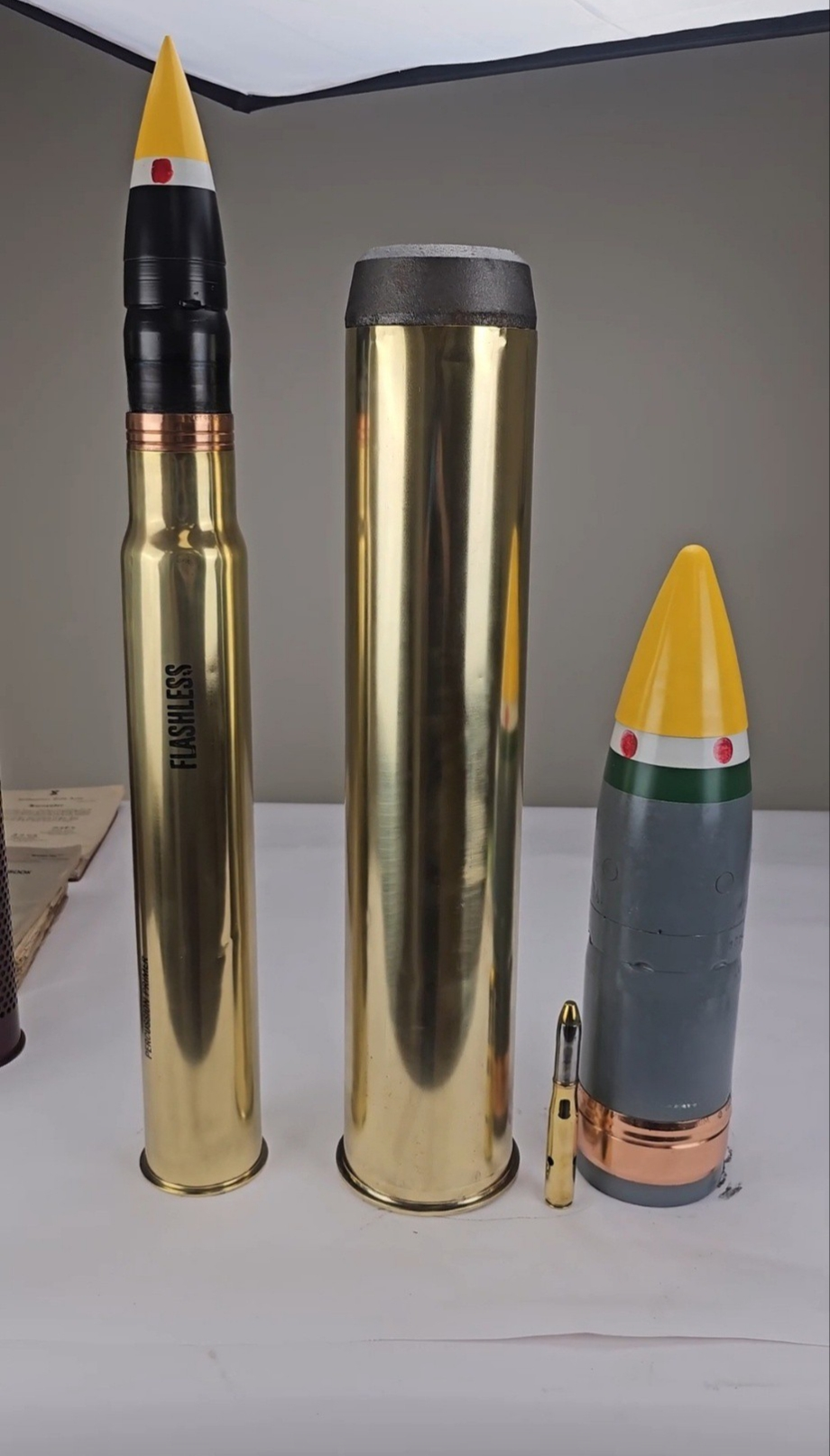
90mm Shell (left), 155mm Brass Shell Casing (center), 155mm T43 (Mod.) AP Projectile (right) and 20mm shell (bottom corner)

Calculated penetration (0-30 degrees)
Ammunition type	Muzzle velocity	Penetration (mm)					
Ammunition type	Muzzle velocity	500 m	1000 m	1500 m	2000 m	2500 m	3000 m
M112B1 (APBC-HE)	670 m/s (2,200 ft/s)	215	213	203	211	195	187
T43 (Mod.) (AP)	770 m/s (2,500 ft/s)	254	243	236	226	215	203
T35E1 (HVAP)	1,106 m/s (3,630 ft/s)	392	355	340	314	292	276
M107 (HE)	701 m/s (2,300 ft/s)	85	85	85	85	85	85

== Variants ==
- T7 - Standard model
- T7E1 - T7 modified for use with a power rammer and ejection equipment.

== Bibliography ==
- Hunnicutt, Richard Pearce (1988). Firepower: A History of the American Heavy Tank. Novato, California: Presidio Press. ISBN 0-89141-304-9.
