= T30 heavy tank =

American heavy tank

Heavy Tank T30
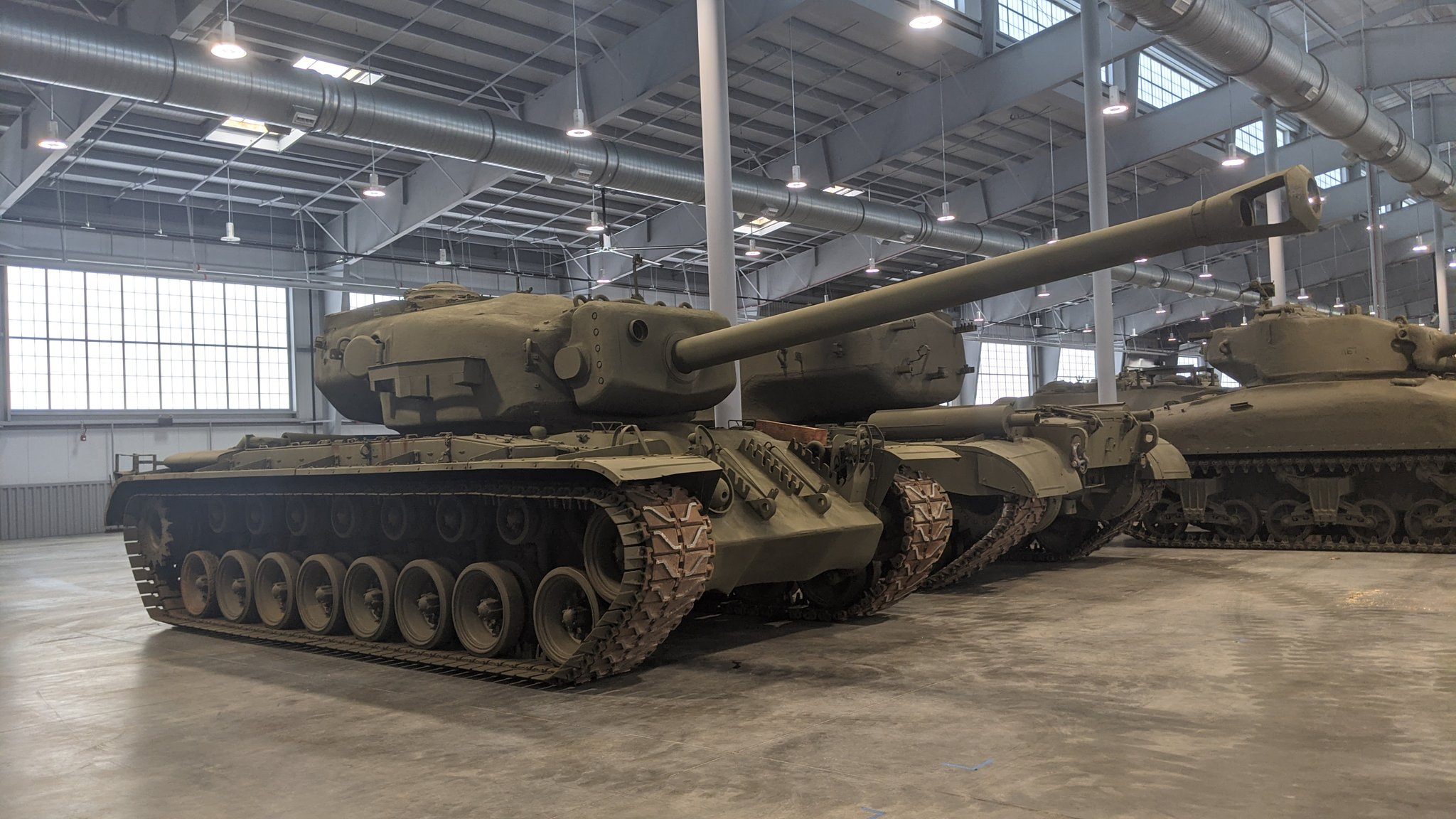
- T30 Heavy Tank in U.S. Army Armor & Cavalry Collection, Fort Benning, in 2022
- Type: Heavy tank
- Place of origin: United States

Service history
- In service: April 1945 - 1950
- Used by: United States

Production history
- Designed: 1944–1947
- Manufacturer: Pressed Steel Car Company; Detroit Arsenal
- Produced: September 1944 - 1947
- No. built: 6
- Variants: T30E1

Specifications
- Mass: 165,000 lb (75 t) combat loaded
- Length: 35.76 ft (10.90 m) gun forward 25 ft (7.6 m) gun aft
- Width: 12.46 ft (3.80 m) over sand shields
- Height: 10.49 ft (3.20 m) over cupola
- Crew: 6 (commander, gunner, driver, radio operator, 2 x loader)
- Armor: hull front 102 mm (4.0 in) @ 54°=174 mm (6.9 in); Side 76 mm (3.0 in); Rear 51 mm (2.0 in) turret front 203–305 mm (8.0–12.0 in); Side 158 mm (6.2 in); Rear 102 mm (4.0 in)
- Main armament: 155mm T7 L/40 rifled gun 41.4 Caliber (34 rounds) (T30); 155mm T7E1 L/40 rifled gun 41.4 Caliber (with assisted loading) (34 rounds) (T30E1)
- Secondary armament: 1 x .50 in (12.7mm) M2HB (1,500 rounds); 2 x .30 in (7.6 mm) Browning M1919A4, bow & coaxial (2,500 rounds)
- Engine: 1,791.7 cu in (29.361 L) Continental AV1790-5A air-cooled 810 hp (600 kW) net at 2400 rpm
- Power/weight: 10.68 hp/t (7.96 kW/t)
- Transmission: General Motors CD-850-1 crossdrive, three speeds (two forward, one reverse)
- Suspension: torsion-bar
- Ground clearance: 18.8 in (48 cm)
- Fuel capacity: 350 US gal (290 imp gal; 1,300 L)
- Operational range: 160 mi (260 km)
- Maximum speed: 25 mph (40 km/h) (on road); 22 mph (35 km/h) (off-road)

The Heavy Tank T30 was a World War II American tank project developed to counter new German tanks, such as Tiger I, Tiger II, and tank destroyers, such as the Jagdtiger, or Soviet heavy tanks, such as IS-2 or IS-3. The T30 was designed at the same time as the T29 Heavy Tank.

== History ==
=== Previous developments ===
The poor results of the Heavy Tank M6 program led to lethargy in American heavy tank development by the first half of 1944. The success of American medium tanks in North Africa led the American military to believe that they would not need heavy tanks. However, the summer of 1944 in Normandy proved sobering. It turned out that the Germans had new types of heavy tanks that were tough nuts to crack for American tanks and tank destroyers. As a result, the development of several new heavy tanks was expedited in late July 1944, and the Heavy Tank T30 was one of them.

=== Starting afresh ===
In early August 1944, discussions cropped up about the brand-new Heavy Tank M6A2E1, a thorough modernization of the Heavy Tank M6. General Lucius Clay spoke out against this idea, due to it lacking mobility and having an estimated mass of 77 tons. The idea of developing a brand-new tank called Heavy Tank T29 was first voiced on 14 August. The chassis was inspired by the Heavy Tank T26, the turret and armament were similar to those of the M6A2E1.

=== Prototypes ===
T30 prototypes

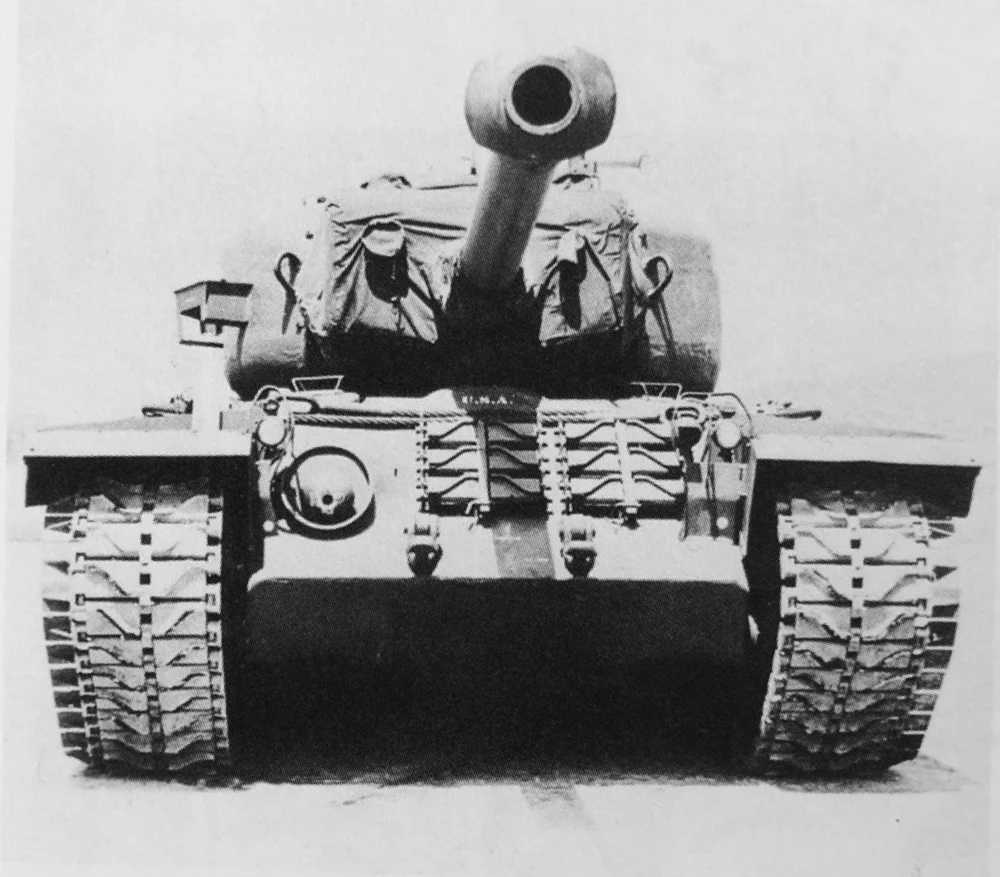
Prototype of T30 tank at Aberdeen Proving Ground

However, there were questions about the T29 from the very beginning. The primary enemy of the future T29 would have been the Tiger II, which had a 150 mm thick upper glacis plate. Doubts that the 105 mm T5E1 gun could penetrate this much armor were raised early on. Because of this, one more prospective tank was announced on 14 August: the Heavy Tank T30. Its hull and turret were identical to the T29, but the gun was different.

The 155 mm M1A1 gun, known as the Long Tom, was chosen as the starting point for this weapon. This gun was developed in the late 1930s to replace the 155 mm M1918 gun, a copy of the French GPF. The characteristics of this new gun were close to that of the Soviet 152 mm special power Br-2 gun. The muzzle velocity was slightly lower, the shell was slightly lighter, but generally the performance was the same. While only 39 Br-2 guns were built, American industry put out 1882 guns from the M1 family between October 1940 and June 1945. Few operations in North Africa and Europe were performed without the Long Tom taking part.

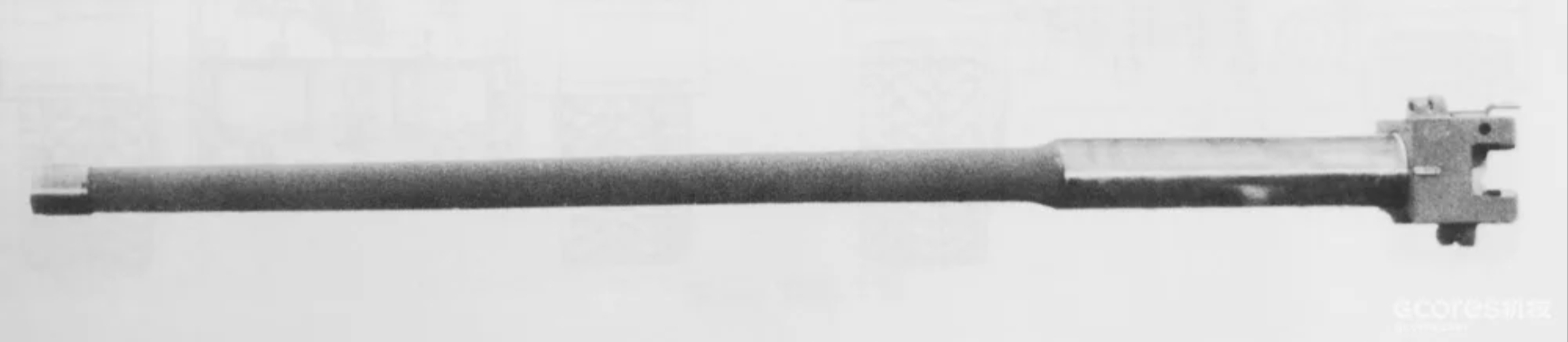
155 mm T7 gun. The first samples were ready in 1945.

Officially, work on the Heavy Tank T30 began on 14 September 1944. Plans were made to produce two prototypes, the same number as for the T29. Unlike its brother, which was scheduled to be produced in a series of 1200 tanks, the T30 was never going to be ordered in bulk. This indicates that the T30 was always going to be a backup plan and was chiefly meant to test the 155 mm gun, which was given the index T7. The length of the barrel was reduced to 6414 mm (41.4 calibers). The muzzle velocity decreased to 717 m/s. Nevertheless, this was the most powerful tank gun built in metal to that day. However, the M1A1 did not yet have an armor piercing shell, which was designed later.

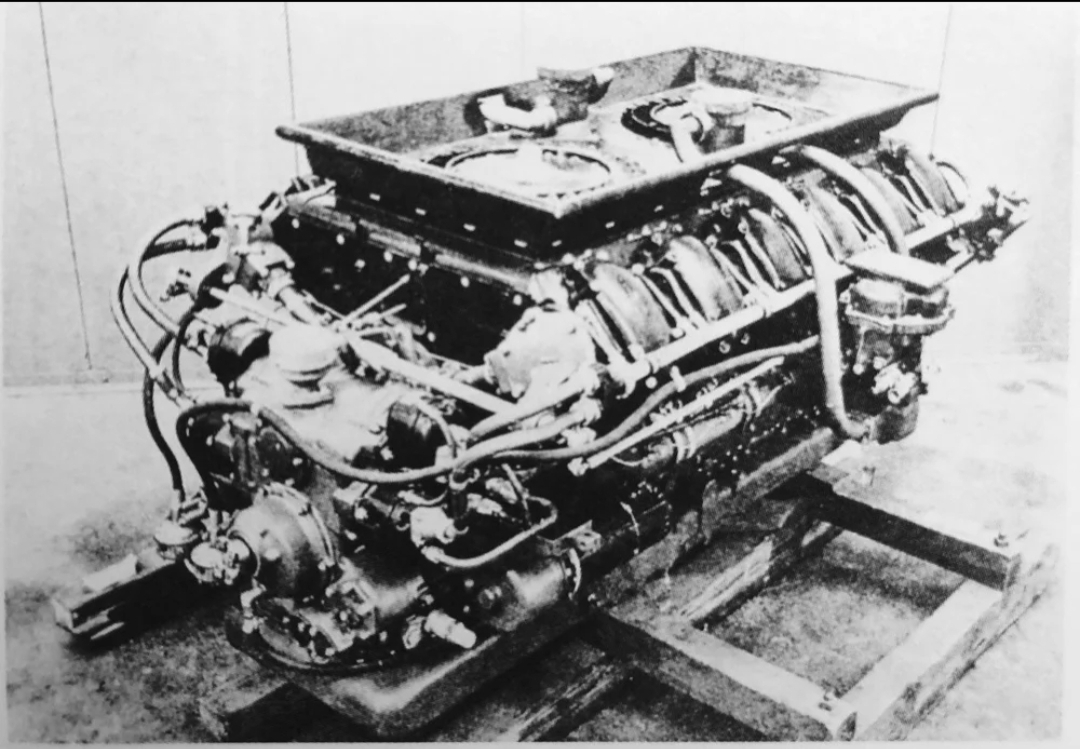
AV-1790 Continental engine that was used on the T30 and T34 heavy tanks. This engine ended up on top in competitive trials.

The first changes to the Heavy Tank T30 program were made towards the end of 1944. It was clear that the heavy tanks would be late to the war, and not only was the volume of the orders reduced, but the chassis was revised. The engine was the first to change. Initially, the plan was to use the 27 L Ford GAC, which put out 770 hp. However, even initial estimates showed that the power to weight ratio of the T29 and T30 would be low, and a new engine was suggested: the air cooled 29 L Continental AV-1790. This engine could produce up to 810 hp. The transmission also changed. Like the T29, the final selection was made in favour of the Alisson CD-850-1.

Changes were also made to the turret. Like the T29, the turret of the T30 was initially the same as on the M6A2E1. This turret was referred to as the T29 turret: the M6A2E1 was nothing but a test platform. A number of issues were discovered, such as the possibility that fragments and bullets could enter the turret through slits, and the turret had to be redesigned. It ended up changing significantly, but the T29 and T30 still had identical turrets. The only difference was the number of coaxial machine guns: one or two. The new gun mount was indexed T124.

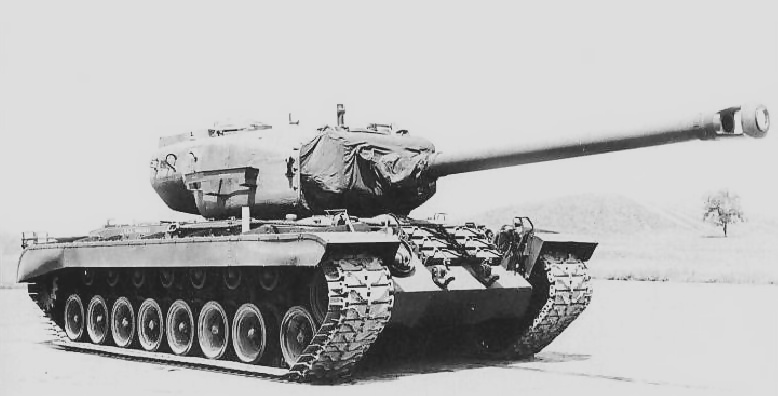
In addition to a different gun, the Heavy Tank T30 only had one machine gun at hull

Due to the much larger gun compared to the T29, the difference in mass was great. The T30 ended up weighing 75,800 kg, while the T29 weighed 64,183 kg. The Heavy Tank T29E3 was weighed: 65,317 kg. The more powerful engine gave the T30 a Nearby power to weight ratio: 10.68 hp/ton, compared to the Heavy Tank T29E3's 10.74 hp/ton. The T30 did have one drawback, and it was linked to the gun. The tank only carried 32 rounds of ammunition compared to the T29's 63. The rate of fire was low, which could be expected from a gun of such caliber.

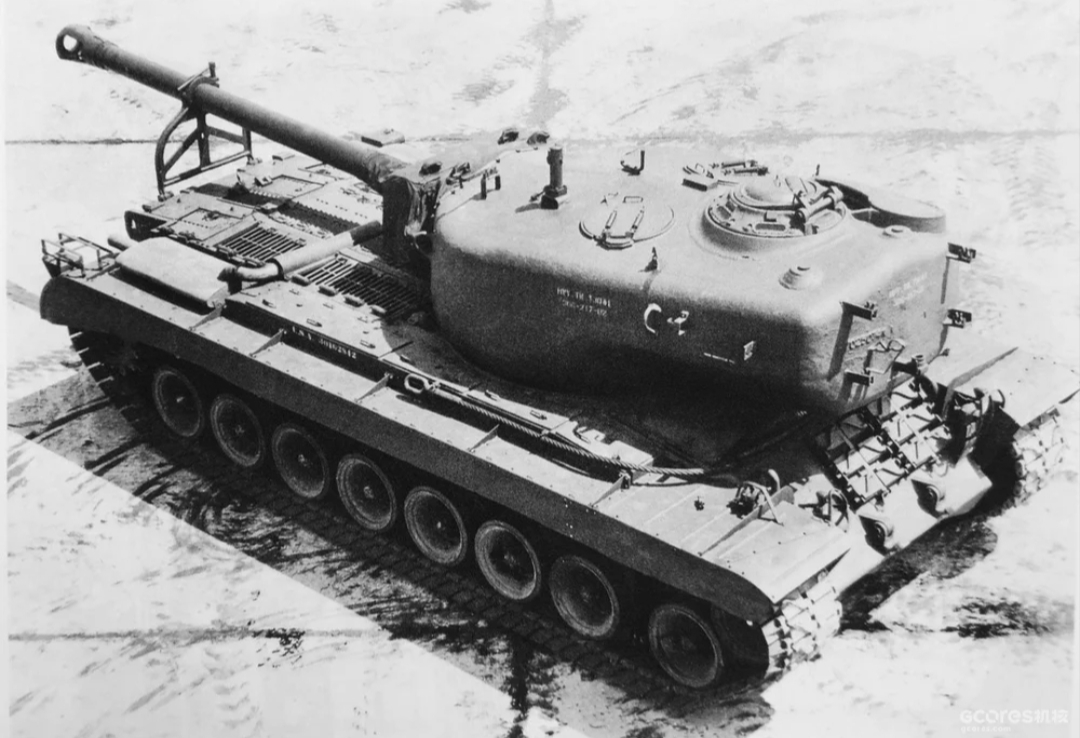
In travel position

Work on experimental heavy tanks proceeded slowly. The T30 was only built three and a half years after development began. The tanks received the Continental AV-1790-5A engine, an improved variant that was developed in parallel with the tank. The first prototype T30 tank was completed in March 1945 and received the registration number USA 30162842. It was sent to the Aberdeen Proving Grounds at the end of March. Meanwhile, the number of T30 tanks that were ordered went up. Often only two tanks are mentioned, but documents indicate otherwise. By May 1947 there were already six T30s with registration numbers USA 30162842-USA 30162847. Of those, tanks with serial numbers 1, 2, 4, 5, and 6 were sent to the Aberdeen Proving Grounds. Tank #3 remained at the Detroit arsenal and became a test lab. A number of the tanks did not remain at the proving grounds for long. On 8 June 1948, tank #5 departed for Fort Knox, on 23 July tank #6 was sent to Yuma, and on 20 January 1949, tank #4 was sent to Fort Churchill in Canada. Tanks #1 and #2 remained at the Aberdeen Proving Grounds and went through the most testing.

Even though some of the tanks spent only a few months or even weeks at the proving grounds, they were all broken in. For instance, tank #4 traveled for 213 km before being sent to Canada for winter trials. Some defects were discovered in the transmission. Tank #6 that was sent to Yuma had some engine components replaced before it was sent out. Additional trials took place in October-December 1948, and the transmission had to be replaced. In 1949 the transmission was replaced with the improved CD-850-3.

As for the other tanks, they drove significantly further during trials. T30 #1 drove for 800 km, of which 142.5 km was using a CD-850-2 transmission. T30 #2 set the record among all the heavy tanks. The tank drove for 3766 km in total, 1492 of which were with the CD-850-2 transmission. The engine and transmission had to be replaced during trials, but nevertheless the AV-1790 showed itself to be much more reliable than the Ford GAC. Since this engine was also noticeably more powerful, it was considered the winner of the comparative trials. Production of the Medium Tank M46 with the Continental AV-1790-5A engine and CD-850-3 transmission began in 1949. This combination of engine and transmission was also used in the Heavy Tank T43, which turned into the M103.

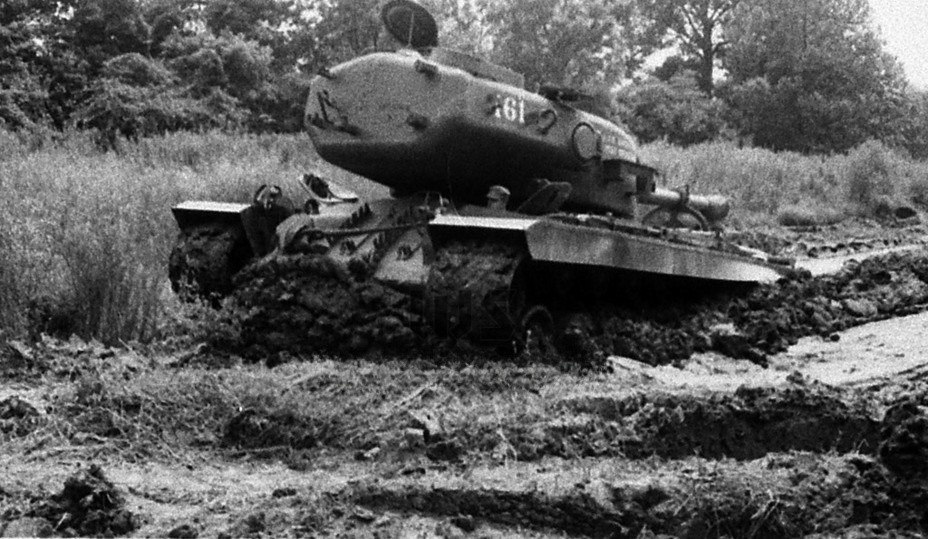
T30 #5 during mobility trials, Fort Knox, 1948. This tank also survived to this day.

Surprisingly, the T30 was the longest lasting among the experimental American heavy tanks. 4 of the 6 prototypes survive to this day. Of the two tanks that were tested at the Aberdeen Proving Grounds, #1 is clearly still around. Tank #3 also survived, the only heavy tank at the Detroit Tank Arsenal that was not scrapped. Tank #6 is currently in Fort Jackson, and tank #5 is on display at the U.S. Army Armor & Cavalry Collection.

== Early tanks ==
Plans for four pilot heavy tanks were put forward in 1944; two T29 with a 105 mm gun and two T30 with a 155 mm gun.

The T30 pilot models were started in April 1944 and were delivered in 1945.

Apart from modifications to fit the different engine, the chassis was the same as the T29. The 155 mm (6.1 in) gun fired separate loading (shell and charge) ammunition. The loader was assisted by a spring rammer. The T30 was fitted with one of the largest guns ever used on an American tank. The high, rounded edge turret was needed to accommodate the standing loader and large gun mount. Even then the gun could only be loaded at limited elevations. It could carry a mixed assortment of 34 T35E1 HVAP (high-velocity armor piercing), M112B1 and T29E1 APCBC-HE (armor-piercing capped ballistic cap high-explosive) M107 HE (high explosive), or M110 WP (Smoke) rounds.

== Variants ==
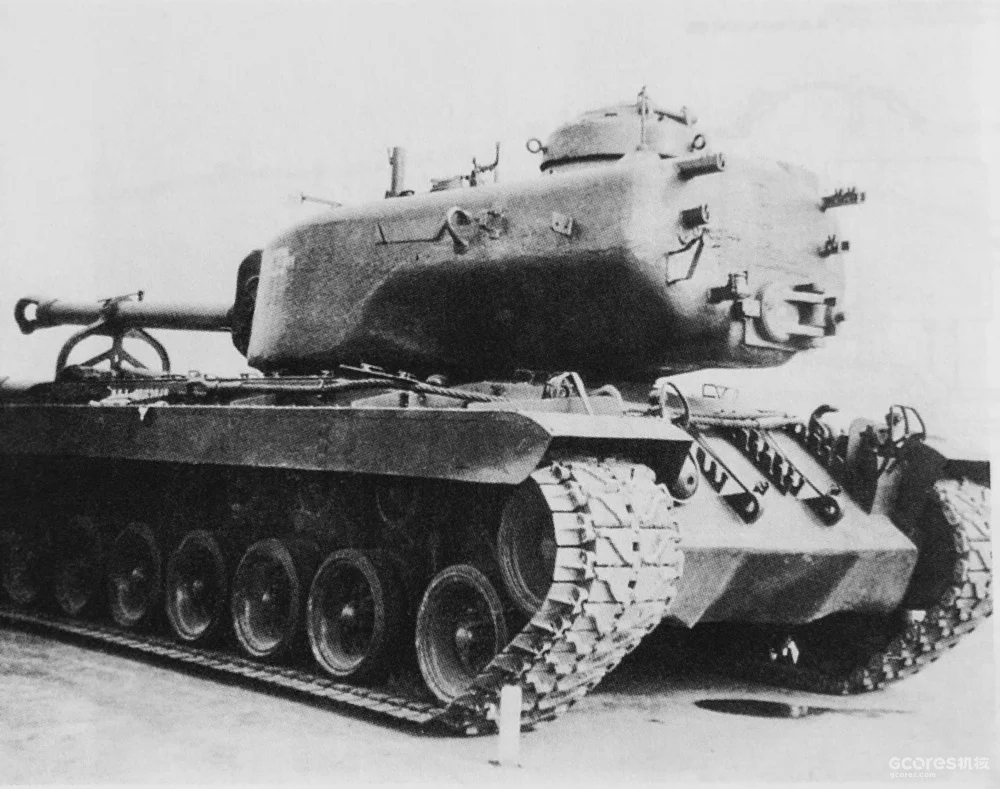
The Heavy Tank T30E1 had a raised commander's cupola and a hatch in the back of the turret.

One pilot model, designated T30E1, had a semi-automatic system added to assist the loader in ramming the ammunition into the breech. This brought the gun breech into position, rammed the round from the loading tray into the breech and then returned the gun to the initial angle. An additional hatch at the back of the turret was added for the automatic ejection of the empty shell casings.

The weight of the shell was 43 kg (95 lb) and the charge 18 kg (40 lb), a total of 61 kg (134 lb) for the whole round, which made it difficult to handle and gave it a rate of fire of only two rounds per minute when manually loaded.

Two of the T30 pilot tanks were later used as the basis for the T34 Heavy Tank equipped with a 120mm gun.

== Surviving examples ==
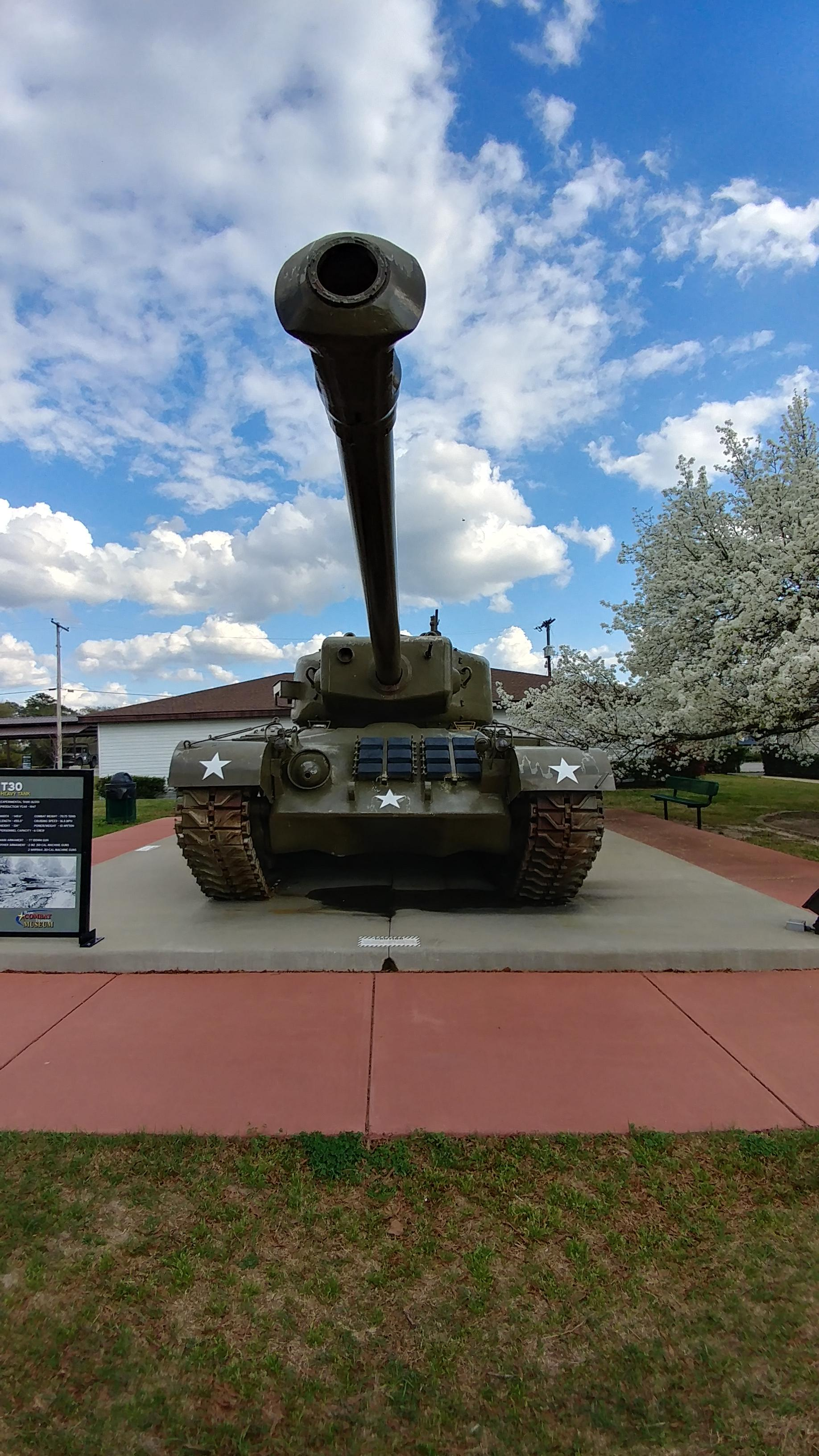
T30 Heavy Tank at Fort Jackson, South Carolina, US.

Four are surviving examples; one each at the U.S. Army Armor and Cavalry Collection, Fort Benning, Georgia. the Detroit Arsenal in Warren, Michigan, at Fort Jackson, South Carolina and in Aberdeen Proving Grounds

== Sources ==
- Hunnicutt, Richard Pearce (1988). Firepower: A History of the American Heavy Tank. Novato, California: Presidio Press. ISBN 0-89141-304-9.
