= T29 heavy tank =

American heavy tank

T29
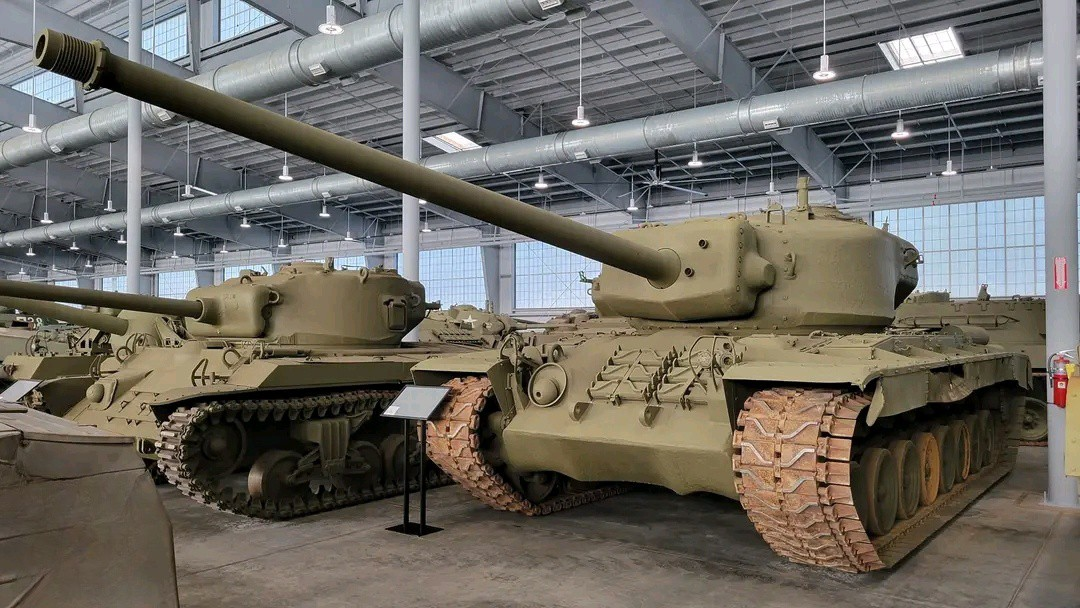
- T29 heavy tank in U.S. Army Armor & Cavalry Collection, 2022
- Type: Heavy tank
- Place of origin: United States

Service history
- In service: 1944 - 1950
- Used by: United States Army

Production history
- Designed: 1944–1945
- Manufacturer: Pressed Steel Car Company; Detroit Arsenal
- No. built: 7
- Variants: T29, T29E1, T29E2, and T29E3

Specifications (T29)
- Mass: 64.2000 metric tons; 70.7684 short tons; 63.1861 long tons (combat loaded)
- Length: 37.95 ft (11.57 m) gun forward 25 ft (7.6 m) gun aft
- Width: 12.46 ft (3.80 m) over sand shields
- Height: 10.49 ft (3.20 m) over cupola
- Crew: 6 (driver, assistant driver, commander, gunner, loader, assistant loader)
- Armor: hull front 102 mm (4.0 in) @ 54°=228 mm (9.0 in); Side 76 mm (3.0 in); Rear 51 mm (2.0 in) turret front 203–305 mm (8.0–12.0 in); Side 158 mm (6.2 in); Rear 102 mm (4.0 in)
- Main armament: 105 mm gun T5E1 (63 rounds) (T29E1, T29E3); 105 mm gun T5E2 (63 rounds) (T29, T29E2)
- Secondary armament: 2 x .50 in (12.7 mm) Browning M2HB machineguns, coaxial 1x .50 M2HB flexible AA (2,420 rounds); 1x .30 Browning M1919A4, bow (2,500 rounds)
- Engine: 1,649 cubic inch (27 liter) Ford GAC V12 gasoline 750 hp (560 kW) net at 2800 rpm
- Power/weight: 11.68 hp/tonne (net)
- Transmission: General Motors CD-850-1 crossdrive, three speeds (two forward, one reverse)
- Suspension: torsion-bar
- Ground clearance: 18.8 in (48 cm)
- Fuel capacity: 300 US gallons (1,140 liters)
- Operational range: 100 miles (160 km)
- Maximum speed: 22 mph (35 km/h)

The T29 Heavy Tank was an American heavy tank project started in March 1944 to counter the appearance of the German Tiger II heavy tank. The T29 was not ready in time for the war in Europe, but it did provide post-war engineers with opportunities for applying engineering concepts to artillery and automotive components.

== Development ==
The T29 was based upon a lengthened version of the T26E3 chassis and featured heavier armor; an upgraded 12-cylinder Ford GAC engine producing 750 hp at 2,800rpm, which gave it a power-to-weight ratio of 11.68 hp/t; more comfortable controls for the driver; and a massive new turret incorporating the high-velocity 105 mm gun T5E1. The T29E1 trialed the use of a Allison V1710 V12 engine.; while the T29E3 variant featured a coincidence rangefinder projecting from both sides of the turret, distinctively resembling "ears".

The tank weighed approximately 132,000 lb (60 t; 59 long tons) unloaded and 141,000 lb (64 t; 63 long tons) combat loaded. The hull armor consisted of a 102 mm (4.0 in) thick plate, which was sloped at 54 degrees. The turret had a maximum armor thickness of 279 mm (11.0 in) compared to 185 mm (7.3 in) on that of the German Tiger II, increasing to 305 mm (12.0 in) on the mantlet; and had a traverse speed of 18 degrees per second, taking 20 seconds for a full rotation. The gun was able to elevate 20°+/-10° from horizontal.

The 105 mm gun was 7.06 m (23.2 ft) long (65 calibers, 105 L/65) compared to the 6.29 m (20.6 ft) of the Tiger II's 8.8 cm KwK 43 (71 calibers long, 88/L71); and had a muzzle velocity of 914 m/s (3,000 ft/s). A total of 63 rounds were to be carried, with 46 in ammo racks; weighing 2.2 tons total. The T30E1 HE shell could pierce 1.3 m (51 in) of concrete at 1,500 m (4,900 ft), while the T29E3 High-velocity Armor Piercing could penetrate 360 mm (14 in) at 457 m (1,500 ft), and 292 mm (11.5 in) at 1,829 m (6,000 ft). The secondary armament consisted of two coaxial .50 caliber M2 Browning machine guns mounted in the mantlet and an additional ball-mounted .30 caliber M1919 Browning in the right side of the hull, with provision for an additional .50 caliber anti-aircraft gun to be mounted on a pintle stem atop the roof.

The tank had a modest cruising range of 161 km (100 mi). It could cross a trench 2.4 m (94 in) wide, wade in water 1.2 m (47 in) deep, climb a 1 m (39 in) step, and could handle a 30-degree slope. The tank was also capable of pivoting on the spot. Suspension consisted of 8 double road wheels with rubber tires, 7 return roller on each side, and had the drive sprockets in the rear. The tank had a crew of six, with two acting as a loader for the gun.

The procurement of 1,200 T29s was proposed on 1 March 1945, and revised to 1,152 on 12 April 1945, but by shortly after the end of World War II, only one T29 had been produced, with a second partially completed. In August 1945, the order was cancelled entirely, and it was intended to procure ten T29s for postwar testing. This number was later reduced to eight in July 1947.

The T30 heavy tank was developed in conjunction with the T29. As originally intended, the only major difference between the two was the use of the 155 mm gun T7 gun in the T30. However, the decision was later made to equip the T30s with the Continental AV1790 engine, leading to the engine deck being redesigned. In addition, the heavier 155mm ammunition led to the T30 being given an additional loader. Two vehicles were produced, with a further two being diverted to the T34 heavy tank program.

The T34 heavy tank was the final variation of the T29 concept, using the same hull as the T30 but with the armament exchanged for a 120 mm gun based on the M1 anti-aircraft gun to further increase the armor penetration capability.

== Variants ==
- T29. Standard version equipped with a T5E2 gun and Ford GAC engine.
- T29E1. T29 number 1 modified to use the Allison V1710 engine.
- T29E2. T29 number 2 equipped with a computing sight and combination aim controls; armed with the T5E2 gun.
- T29E3. T29 number 8 equipped with panoramic telescopes and a large coincidence rangefinder.

	T29	T29E1	T29E3
Length (gun forward)	455.5 in (11.6 m)		
Width	149.7 in (3.8 m) (over sandshields)		
Height	126.9 in (3.2 m) (over cupola)		
Ground clearance	18.8 in (47.8 cm)		
Top speed	22 mph (35 km/h)		
Fording	42 in (1.1 m)		
Max. grade	60%		
Max. trench	6.25 ft (1.91 m)		
Max. wall	26 in (0.7 m)		
Range	100 mi (160 km)	75 mi (121 km)	
Power	770 hp (570 kW) at 2800 rpm	870 hp (650 kW) at 2800 rpm	770 hp (570 kW) at 2800 rpm
Power-to-weight ratio	10.9 hp/ST (9.0 kW/t)	12.3 hp/ST (10.1 kW/t)	10.7 hp/ST (8.8 kW/t)
Torque	1,560 lb⋅ft (2,120 N⋅m) at 1600 rpm	1,800 lb⋅ft (2,440 N⋅m) at 1800 rpm	1,560 lb⋅ft (2,120 N⋅m) at 1600 rpm
Weight, combat loaded	141,500 lb (64,180 kg)	141,000 lb (63,960 kg)	144,000 lb (65,320 kg)
Ground pressure	12.2 psi (84 kPa) (28 in (71 cm) tracks); 14.9 psi (103 kPa) (23 in (58 cm) tracks)	12.2 psi (84 kPa) (28 in (71 cm) tracks); 14.8 psi (102 kPa) (23 in (58 cm) tracks)	12.4 psi (85 kPa) (28 in (71 cm) tracks); 15.2 psi (105 kPa) (23 in (58 cm) tracks)
Main armament	T5E2 105 mm gun	T5E1 105 mm gun	
Elevation, main gun	+20° / −10°		
Traverse rate	20 seconds/360°		
Main gun ammo	63 rounds		
Firing rate	6 rounds/minute		

== Surviving tanks ==
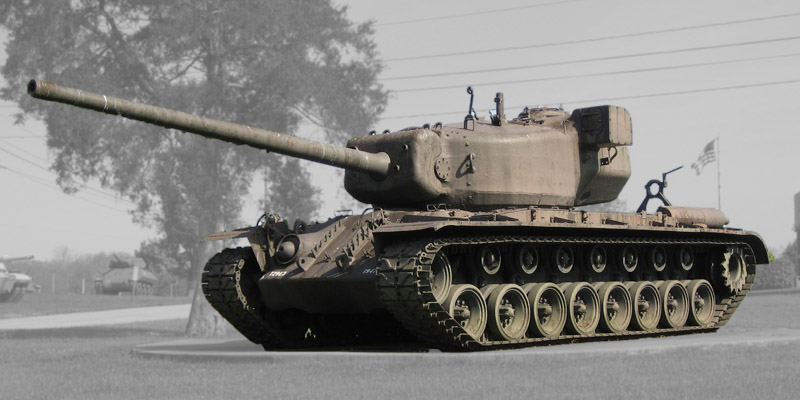
T29E3 at the General George Patton Museum in 2007; note the rangefinders on the side of the turret

There are two surviving T29s at the U.S. Army Armor and Cavalry Collection at Fort Benning, Georgia. One of these is a T29E3 with the distinctive rangefinder, while the other is a standard T29 model.

== See also ==
- List of U.S. military vehicles by model number
- Military technology and equipment

=== Tanks of comparable role, performance and era ===
- M6A2E1 heavy tank – Prototype used for testing T29's armament system
- T32 heavy tank – Prototype with a similar design; uses a 90mm cannon
- T30 heavy tank – Codevelopment of T29 using a 155mm cannon and Continental AV1790 engine
- T34 heavy tank – A modernized T30 using a 120mm cannon
- IS-3 heavy tank – Contemporary Soviet assault tank
- IS-4 heavy tank – Contemporary Soviet heavy tank
- Caernarvon Mark II – British heavy tank
- AMX-50 heavy tank – Prototype French heavy tank series

== Sources ==
- Hunnicutt, Richard Pearce (1988). Firepower: A History of the American heavy tank. Novato, California: Presidio Press. ISBN 0-89141-304-9.
