= M5 mine =

US anti-tank mine

The M5 is a United States minimum metal plastic cased anti-tank blast mine. The mine uses either a glass or porcelain internal case with a protective outer case, made from felt impregnated with asphalt and tar paper. The mine uses a chemical fuze rather than a mechanical one. It contains either 5.4 lb (2.4 kg) of TNT or 5.7 lb (2.6 kg) of tetrytol (a mixture of tetryl and TNT). It was used during the Second World War. The practice version, designated as M9, was also produced.

== Specifications ==
- Weight: 15 lb (6.8 kg) or 15.3 lb (6.9 kg)
- Explosive content: 5.4 lb (2.4 kg) of TNT or 5.7 lb (2.6 kg) of tetrytol
- Diameter: 10 inches (250 mm)
- Height: 5 inches (125 mm)
- Operating pressure: 275 to 475 pounds (125 to 215 kg)
