= M6 heavy tank =

American prototype heavy tank of World War II

Heavy Tank M6
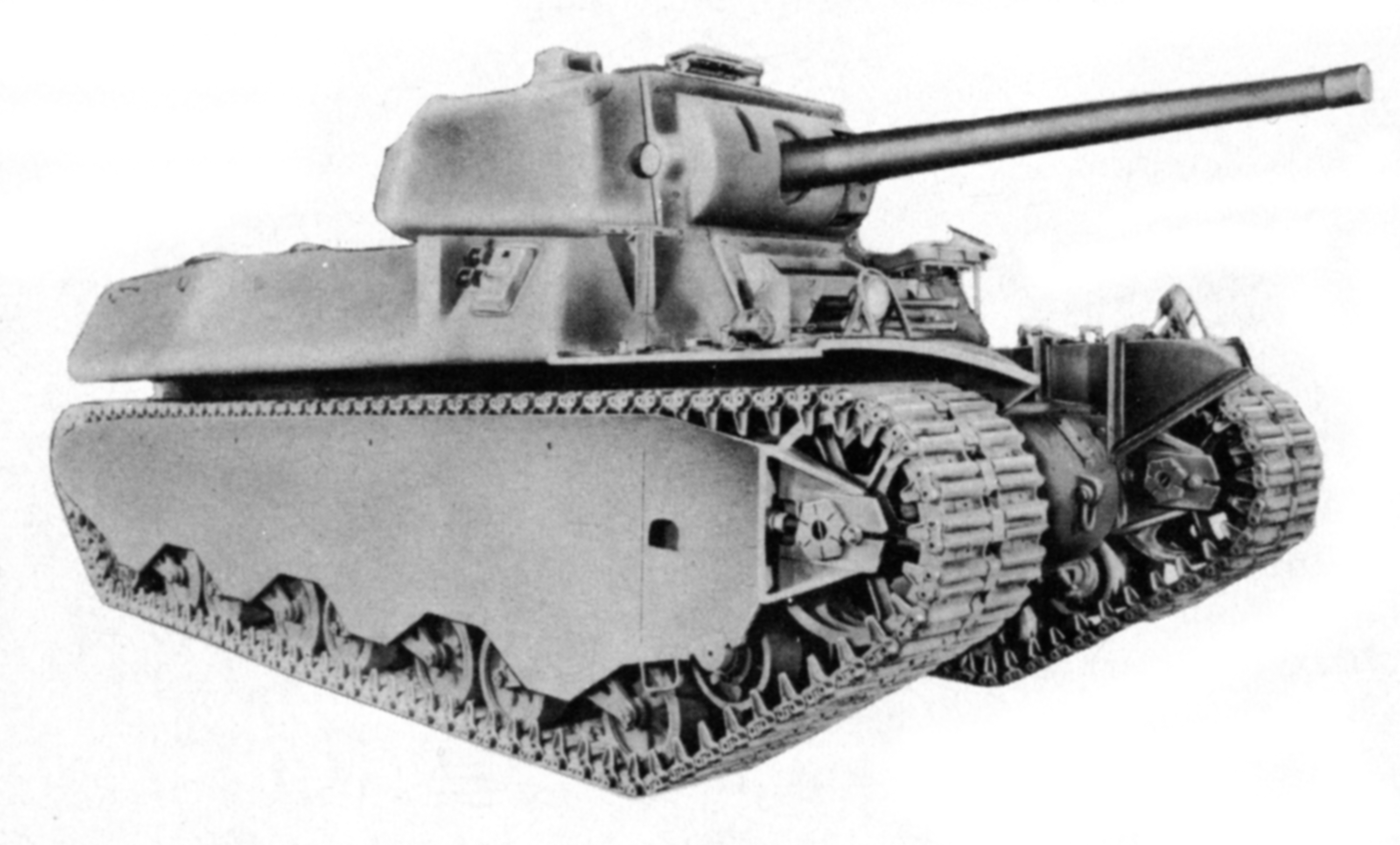
- M6 prototype
- Type: Heavy tank
- Place of origin: United States

Service history
- In service: Trials only
- Used by: United States Army
- Wars: World War II

Production history
- Designer: US Army Ordnance Corps
- Manufacturer: Baldwin Locomotive
- Unit cost: $171,615 (M6A1)
- No. built: 40
- Variants: 6

Specifications (M6)
- Mass: 126,500 lb (57.4 tonnes) combat loaded
- Length: 27 ft 8 in (8.43 m) gun forward
- Width: 10 ft 3 in (3.12 m) over track armor
- Height: 9 ft 10 in (3.0 m) to turret roof
- Crew: 6 (commander, gunner, driver, assistant driver, loader, assistant loader)
- Armor: 25–101 mm
- Main armament: 1 × 3 in (76.2 mm) gun M7(75 rounds); 1 × 37 mm (1.46 in) gun M6 (202 rounds)
- Secondary armament: 2 × .50 cal (12.7mm) Browning M2HB machine guns, hull (6,900 rounds); 2 × .30 Browning M1919A4 machine guns, one fixed (bow), one flexible AA (5,500 rounds)
- Engine: 1,823 in^{3} (29.88 L) Wright G-200 9-cylinder gasoline 825 hp at 2,300 rpm
- Power/weight: 15.7 hp/tonne
- Transmission: Timken mechanical model 16001, three speeds (two forward, one reverse); rear drive sprocket
- Suspension: Horizontal volute spring
- Ground clearance: 20.5 in (52 cm)
- Fuel capacity: 477 US gallons (1,810 L)
- Operational range: 100 miles (160 km)
- Maximum speed: 22 mph (35 km/h)

The Heavy Tank M6 was an American heavy tank designed during World War II. The tank was produced in small numbers and never saw combat.

== Development history ==
Because of limited budgets for tank development in the interwar years, at the outbreak of World War II the United States Army possessed few tanks, though it had been keeping track of the use of tanks in Europe and Asia. Successful employment of armored units in 1939–40, mostly by the Germans, gave momentum to a number of US tank programs, including a heavy tank. The United States possessed a massive industrial infrastructure and large numbers of engineers that would allow for mass production of tanks.

Following the Chief of Infantry recommendation from May 1940, the US Army Ordnance Corps started to work on a 50-ton heavy tank design. The project was approved in June and the vehicle received the designation Heavy Tank T1.

Initially, a multi-turreted design was proposed, with two main turrets each armed with a low-velocity T6 75 mm (2.95 inch) gun, a secondary turret with a 37 mm gun and a coaxial .30 caliber (7.62 mm) machine gun, and another secondary turret with a 20 mm gun and a coaxial .30 caliber machine gun. Four .30 caliber machine guns were to be installed in ball mounts, two in the glacis (front) plate and two in the rear corners of the hull. The design was somewhat similar in concept to multi-turreted breakthrough tanks developed in Europe in the 1920s and throughout the 1930s, such as the 1925 British Vickers A1E1 Independent or the Soviet T-35 of the early 1930s, albeit on a much more powerful scale: the older tank designs were typically armed with a single light or medium-caliber main gun and multiple machine guns, and had armor only sufficient to protect from small arms fire. Later in the decade, however, European tank developers switched to single-turret designs.

By October, the US developers reached the same conclusion as their European counterparts. The armament was changed to a single vertically stabilized 3-inch (76.2 mm) gun and a coaxial 37 mm gun in a single three-man turret with both manual and electric traverse. The turret had a commander's cupola identical to that of the M3 Medium Tank. Additional armament consisted of two .50 caliber machine guns in a bow mount (operated by the assistant driver), two .30 caliber machine guns in the front plate (fired electrically by the driver), one .30 caliber in the commander's cupola and one .50 caliber in a rotor mount for anti-aircraft use in the right rear of the turret roof (operated by the loader). The crew consisted of commander (seated in the turret left), gunner to the right of the gun, gun loader (turret), driver and assistant driver in the front left and right of the hull respectively, and another crewman in the hull to pass ammunition to the turret.

One of the main challenges was developing a powerpack for such a heavy vehicle. The Wright G-200 air-cooled radial gasoline engine was selected by a committee formed by the Society of Automotive Engineers, but no suitable transmission was available. The committee recommended developing a hydramatic transmission, while a possibility of using a torque converter or an electric transmission was also to be checked.

The project was publicly disclosed in August 1940 when the Army awarded Baldwin Locomotive Works in Pennsylvania a $5.7 million contract for the production of 50 tanks. The Army envisioned building 500 of this type.

The first T1E1 was delivered to the Army in December 1941. From 1941 to 1942, three prototypes were built: one with electric transmission and two with torque converter transmission. Variants with hydramatic transmission were never completed. The prototypes also differed in hull assembly method: one had a welded hull and two had cast hulls.

On 26 May 1942, two variants with torque converter transmission were standardized as M6 (cast hull) and M6A1 (welded hull). Standardization of the electric transmission equipped T1E1 as the M6A2 was never approved, but the manufacturing of the vehicle was nevertheless recommended. It was proposed by the Ordnance Corps that 115 T1E1s would be built for the US Army for "extended service tests." Between that and Services of Supply instruction to increase production with the balance going to aid US allies, this would mean 50 M6s and 65 M6A1s built for the British. Production started in December 1942.

Some minor changes were introduced in the production vehicles: the cupola was replaced by a double-door hatch with a ring mount, while the machine gun in a rotor mount and the left front machine gun were removed.

However, by the time the M6 was ready for production, the Armored Corps had lost interest in the project. The advantages the M6 offered over medium tanks – its much thicker armor and slightly more powerful gun – were offset partly by the shortcomings of the design such as very high silhouette, awkward internal layout, reliability problems, and partly by logistical concerns due to its weight.

In early 1942, the Ordnance Department set a production target of 250 a month with Fisher as a second contractor to meet a planned expansion in the size of the army. However, by September, the focus had changed with tank production scaled back and more aircraft desired for the USAAF. Under this new "Army Supply Program," the M6 production was cut from 5,000 to a little over 100.

By the end of 1942, the Armored Corps was of the opinion that the new M4 Sherman gave adequate solution for the time while being reliable, cheap, and much easier to transport. Thus, they had no need for a heavy tank. In 1943, the production target was reduced again, down to 40, as an economic cut-off.

Production M6 and pilot M6A1 examples were evaluated at Fort Knox in the early part of 1943. The reports were critical of the awkward and inefficient crew stations and the superfluous 37mm gun. However, in October, the tank had performed well enough at Aberdeen Proving Ground to proceed.

The Ordnance Corps had expected the 76 mm gun to be lacking and the T1E1 prototype was tested with a T7 90 mm gun and was found to be a satisfactory gun platform, although the poor turret layout was again noted. By this point, the M6 had been cancelled.

In August 1944, the Ordnance Corps recommended modifying the T1E1s to build 15 specially armored and armed tanks to meet a need for attacking heavily fortified areas. These 77-ton vehicles – designated M6A2E1 – with thicker (equivalent to 7.5-inch (190 mm) vertical protection) glacis armor and a turret developed for the T29 Heavy Tank, armed with a T5E1 105 mm gun, but no increase in engine power. Ordnance believed they could be delivered by November. The proposal was put to the supreme commander in Europe General Eisenhower, who rejected them as impracticable. Two tanks were used to test the T29 turret and gun, but their armor was not modified.

On 14 December 1944, the M6 was declared obsolete. Only 40 had been produced and they never left US soil. Several toured the United States for propaganda purposes where they gave performance displays (such as car crushing) at War Bond drives and the like. All were eventually scrapped except for a single T1E1 which was put on display at the United States Army Ordnance Museum, Aberdeen, Maryland.

The British used the horizontal volute spring suspension system of the M6 in the first of their two A33 Heavy Assault Tank "Excelsior" prototypes.

== Variants ==
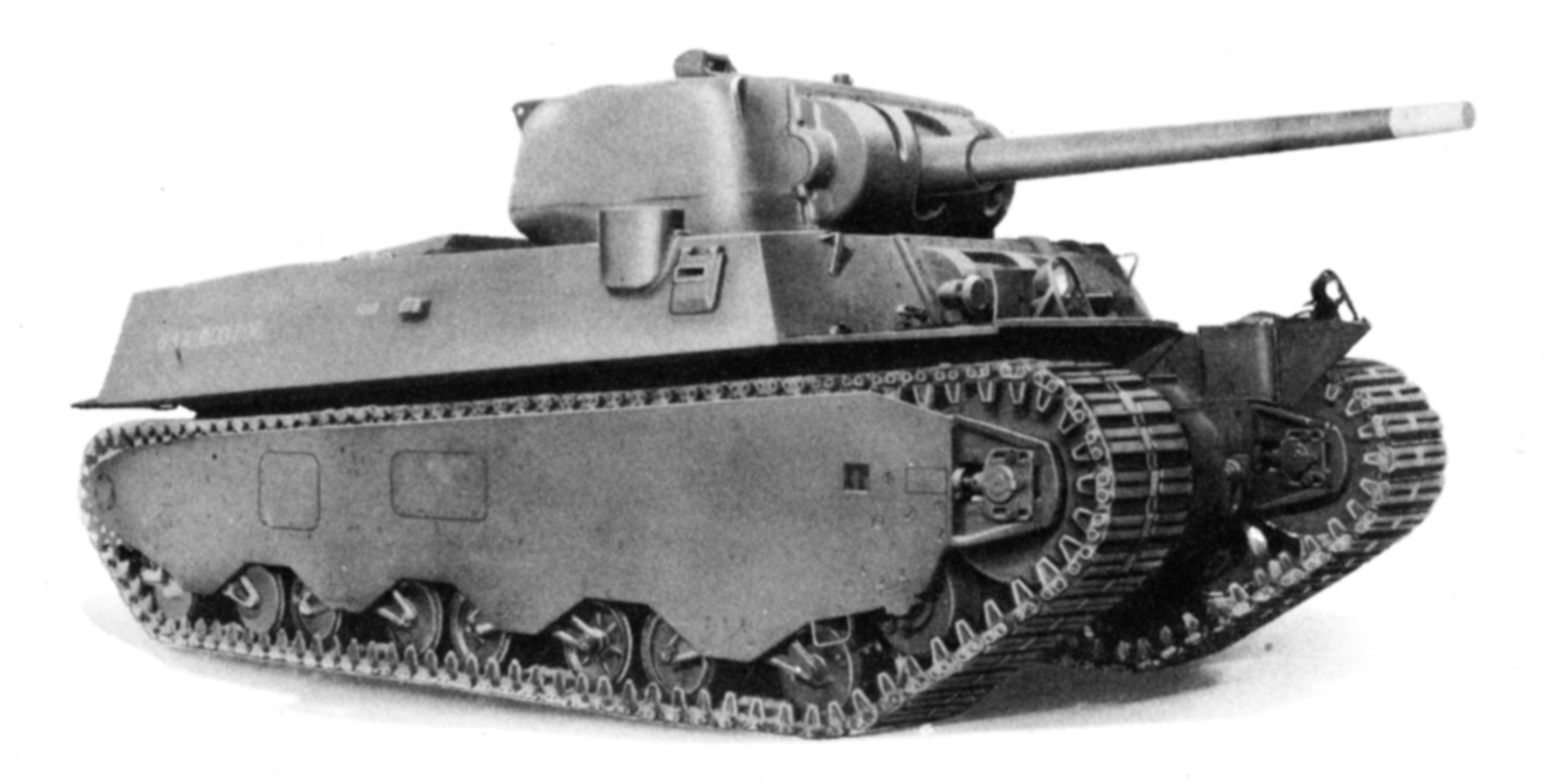
M6A1; note the angular welded hull

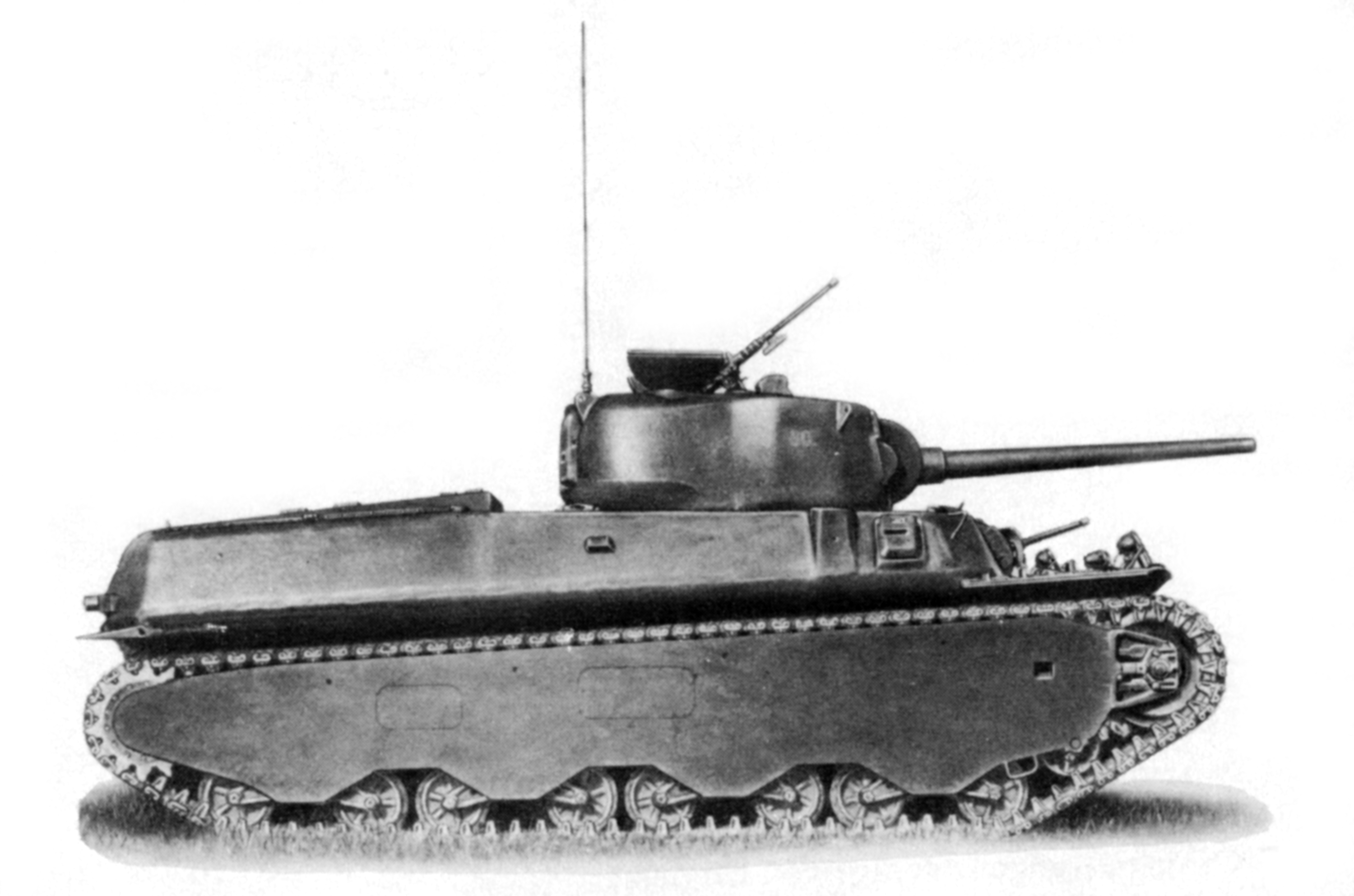
T1E1

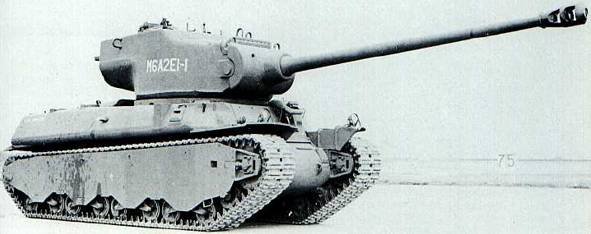
M6A2E1 at Aberdeen Proving Ground, June 1945

- T1 – Cast hull, Hydramatic transmission. Never built.
- T1E1 – Cast hull, General Electric electrical transmission. Standardization proposed as M6A2 but not accepted. Twenty units built.
- T1E2 / M6 – Cast hull, Twin Disc torque converter transmission. Eight units built.
- T1E3 / M6A1 – Welded hull, cast turret, Twin Disc torque converter transmission. Twelve units built.
- T1E4 – Welded hull, four GM 6-71 diesel engines with two Hydramatic transmissions. Cancelled 1942. Never built.
- M6A2E1 – T1E1 fitted with a new turret with a T5E1 105 mm gun. Used for testing T29 heavy tank project armament system. Project cancelled at 22 August 1944. Two units built.

== See also ==
- List of U.S. military vehicles by supply catalog designation
- List of U.S. military vehicles by model number
- TOG II* – British superheavy prototype tank for trench warfare
- T29 – late-war prototype heavy tank; early version turret and gun was tested on M6A2E1 variant

Tanks of comparable role, performance and era

- German VK 30.01 (H) – prototype for the Tiger I
- British Excelsior – prototype heavy tank, two built, did not enter service
- British Churchill – heavy tank, entered service in 1941
- American-British T14 – prototype heavy tank with similar specifications
- Soviet KV-1 – heavy tank, entered service in 1939
- Hungarian 44M Tas – prototype heavy tank, didn't enter production due to military/political situation

Contemporaries to M6A2E1 variant

- German Tiger II – late-war heavy tank, entered service in 1944
- United States T26E4 "Super Pershing" heavy tank – single prototype M26 Pershing with extra armor and improved gun; fought in Western Europe during 1945
- Soviet IS-2 model 1944 – heavy assault tank, entered service in 1944
- Soviet IS-3 – heavy tank, entered service in 1945
- French ARL 44 – heavy tank, too late to see service

== Sources ==
- Chamberlain, Peter & Ellis, Chris (1969), British and American Tanks of World War II, Arco Publishing
- Hunnicutt, Richard Pearce (1988), Firepower: A History of the American Heavy Tank, Novato, California: Presidio Press, ISBN 0-89141-304-9
- Icks, Robert J. (1971), No. 32: The M6 Heavy and M26 Pershing, AFV Weapons, Profile Publishing
