= R. P. Hunnicutt =

American military historian (1926–2011)

- Born: Richard Pearce Hunnicutt; June 15, 1926; Asheville, North Carolina, U.S.
- Died: April 29, 2011 (aged 84); Tigard, Oregon, U.S.
- Education: Stanford University
- Occupations: Historian; Engineer
- Writing career
- Period: 1971-2002

Richard Pearce Hunnicutt (June 15, 1926 – April 29, 2011) was an American historian, known for his research in armored fighting vehicles.

Hunnicutt was born in Asheville, North Carolina, to James Ballard Hunnicutt and Ida Belle Black. He altered his birth certificate to enlist in the U.S. Army in September 1943. On 30 April 1945, while assigned to the 7th Infantry Division on Okinawa, he was wounded by enemy mortar fire when his machine gun squad was countering a Japanese attack near Hacksaw Ridge. Shortly after the fight, 10th Army Commander General Simon Bolivar Buckner Jr., came onto the scene, and awarded PFC Hunnicutt the Silver Star and a promotion to Sergeant. Gen. Buckner would be killed in action nearly seven weeks later on the same island by enemy artillery fire. After the war, he was transferred to Europe, where he completed his army enlistment while stationed in Frankfurt, Germany.

He earned a master's degree in engineering from Stanford University and later worked at General Motors. He met his future wife Susan Haight in Detroit. Later he worked as a metallurgist, consultant and partner in an engineering firm, ANAMET Laboratories. Hunnicutt was a nationally recognized expert in metal fatigue.

Hunnicutt was one of the founders of the U.S. Army Ordnance Museum at Aberdeen Proving Ground and a frequent contributor to the Patton Museum at Fort Knox.

Hunnicutt is mainly known for his research in the history and development of American armored fighting vehicles. He authored many books on American military vehicles.

Historian Steven Zaloga described the multi-volume study as "essential cornerstone for anyone interested in U.S. tank history".

Some of Hunnicutt's collection of notes are held by the U.S. Army Armor and Cavalry Collection.

== Works ==
- Hunnicutt, R.P. (1971) Pershing: A History of the Medium Tank T20 Series. Navato, CA: Presidio Press. ISBN 0-98219-070-0
- — (1971). Sherman: A History of the American Medium Tank.
- — (29 May 2015) [1984]. Patton: A History of the American Main Battle Tank. Battleboro, VT: Echo Point Books & Media. ISBN 978-1626548794.
- — (1988). Firepower: A History of the American Heavy Tank. Novato, California: Presidio Press. ISBN 0-89141-304-9.
- — (15 September 2015) [1990]. Abrams: A History of the American Main Battle Tank. Battleboro, VT: Echo Point Books & Media. ISBN 978-1-62654-166-5.
- — (1992). Stuart, A History of the American Light Tank. Vol. 1. Presidio Press. ISBN 0-89141-462-2.
- — (15 September 2015) [1995]. Sheridan: A History of the American Light Tank. Vol. 2. Battleboro, VT: Echo Point Books & Media. ISBN 978-1-62654-154-2.
- — (15 September 2015) [1999]. Bradley: A History of American Fighting and Support Vehicles. Battleboro, VT: Echo Point Books & Media. ISBN 978-1-62654-153-5.
- — (2001). Half-Track: A History of American Semi-Tracked Vehicles. Navato, CA: Presidio Press. ISBN 0-89141-742-7.
- — (15 September 2015) [2002]. Armored Car: A History of American Wheeled Combat Vehicles. Battleboro, VT: Echo Point Books & Media. ISBN 978-1-62654-254-9.

== Sources ==
- Richard Pearce Hunnicutt Obituary, Published in The Oregonian on May 4, 2011
