= IS tank family =

Series of Soviet WWII heavy tanks

Iosif Stalin tank
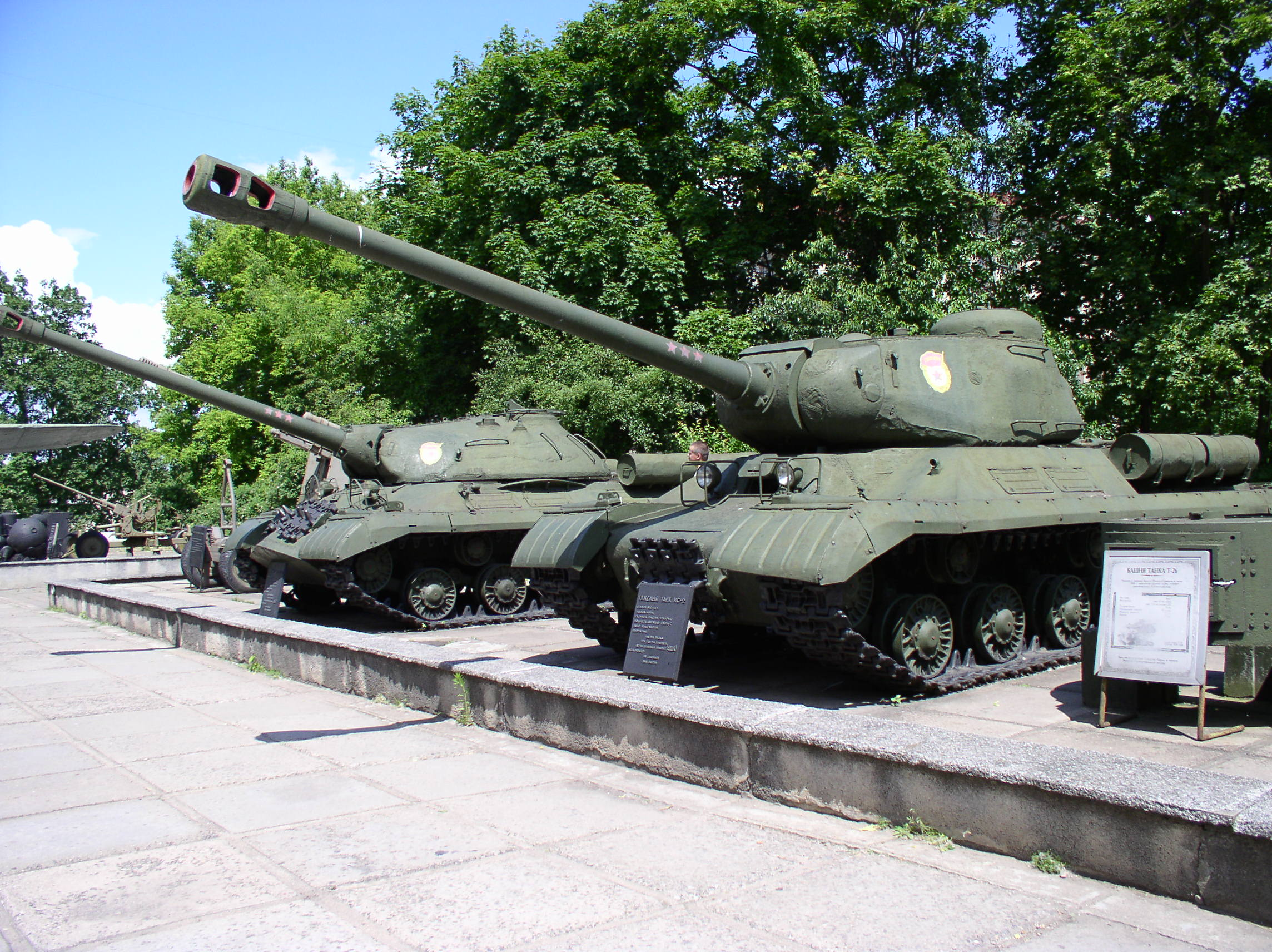
- IS-2 model 1943 (more modern fenders added) (foreground) and IS-3 (background) at the Great Patriotic War Museum, Minsk, Belarus
- Type: Heavy tank
- Place of origin: Soviet Union

Service history
- Used by: Soviet Union; China; Cuba; Czechoslovakia; East Germany; Hungary; Egypt; Poland; North Korea
- Wars: World War II; Korean War; Hungarian Revolution of 1956; Six-Day War; Prague Spring; South Ossetia war (1991–1992)

Production history
- Designer: Zhozef Kotin; Nikolay Dukhov
- Designed: 1943 (IS-2); 1944 (IS-3); 1944–45 (IS-4)
- Manufacturer: Kirov Factory, UZTM
- Unit cost: IS-2: 264,400 rubles
- Produced: 1943–44 (IS-1); 1944–45 (IS-2); 1945–47 (IS-3); 1947–49 (IS-4)
- No. built: 207 (IS-1); 3,854 (IS-2); 2,311 (IS-3); 250 (IS-4); 6 (IS-7) (prototypes)

Specifications (IS-2 Model 1944)
- Mass: 46 tonnes (51 short tons; 45 long tons)
- Length: 9.90 m (32 ft 6 in)
- Width: 3.09 m (10 ft 2 in)
- Height: 2.73 m (8 ft 11 in)
- Crew: 4
- Armor: Hull front: 120 mm Lower glacis: 100 mm at 30° angle Turret front: 100 mm (rounded) Mantlet: 155 mm (rounded) Hull side: 90–130 mm at 9-25° Turret side: 90 mm at 20° angle
- Main armament: D-25T 122 mm gun (28 rounds)
- Secondary armament: 1×DShK, 3×DT (2,079 rounds)
- Engine: 12-cyl. diesel model V-2; 600 hp (450 kW)
- Power/weight: 13 hp/tonne
- Suspension: torsion bar
- Fuel capacity: 820 L (180 imp gal; 220 US gal)
- Operational range: Road: 240 km (150 mi); Cross-country: 180 km (110 mi)
- Maximum speed: 37 km/h (23 mph)

The IS tanks (Russian: ИС) were a series of heavy tanks developed as a successor to the KV-series by the Soviet Union during World War II. The IS acronym is the anglicized initialism of Joseph Stalin (Ио́сиф Ста́лин, Iosif Stalin). The heavy tanks were designed as a response to the capture of a German Tiger I in 1943. They were mainly designed as breakthrough tanks, firing a heavy high-explosive shell that was useful against entrenchments and bunkers. The IS-2 went into service in April 1944 and was used as a spearhead by the Red Army in the final stage of the Battle of Berlin. The IS-3 served on the Chinese-Soviet border, the Hungarian Revolution, the Prague Spring and on both sides of the Six-Day War. The series eventually culminated in the T-10 heavy tank.

== Design and production ==
=== KV-85/IS-85/IS-1 ===
The KV-85 was a KV-1S with the new turret from the Object 237 (IS-85) still in development, mounting the 85mm D-5T gun. The tank was a result of the USSR's tank design bureau being torn in two, one half focusing on the KV-85 and its variants, and the other working on the later IS series. The IS-85 was soon finished and it combined the hull design of the KV-13, the new turret from the KV-85, and the same 85mm D-5T gun as both these tanks. The IS-85 was later referred to as IS-1. The first IS-1 rolled off the line in October 1943, but production was stopped in January 1944, as the IS-1 was quickly replaced by the IS-2. Because of this, only about 200 IS-1s were produced.

=== IS-2 ===
In December 1943, two up-gunned variants of the IS-85 were created: the IS-100, armed with the 100mm D-10 gun, and the IS-122, armed with the 122mm A19 gun (later adopted and renamed as the D-25T). The IS-122 was found to be better than the IS-100 in trials, and so the IS-100 was dropped. The IS-122 was renamed to IS-2 and production started with the 1943 model using the IS-85 chassis. First deliveries of IS-2s were in December 1943. The 1944 model was produced with a revised front slope that was better from an armor point of view while still saving weight. Production in bulk of the IS-2 started in February 1944 and ended nearing the end of World War II. By the end of World War II, 3,854 IS-2 model 1943 and model 1944's combined had been produced. German general Hasso von Manteuffel, who met tanks of that series in combat for the first time in Romania in 1944, considered the Stalin tank "the finest in the world."

=== Object 703 IS-3 ===
There are two tanks known as IS-3: Object 244 was an IS-2 rearmed with the long-barrelled 85 mm cannon (D-5T-85-BM) and developed by the Leningrad Kirov Plant (LKZ), which was never series-produced for service use.

The IS-3 known as Object 703 is a Soviet heavy tank developed in late 1944, and began production in May 1945. Its semi-hemispherical cast turret (resembling an upturned soup bowl), became the hallmark of post-war Soviet tanks. Its pike nose design was also mirrored by other tanks of the IS tank family such as the IS-7 and T-10 tank. Too late to see combat in World War II, the IS-3 participated in the Berlin Victory Parade of 1945, and on the Chinese-Soviet border, the Soviet invasion of Hungary, the Prague Spring and the Six-Day War.

=== Object 701 IS-4 ===
There are two tanks known as IS-4: Object 245 and Object 701. Object 245 was an IS-2 rearmed with a long 100 mm D-10T cannon.

The IS-4 known as the Object 701 was a Soviet heavy tank that started development in 1943 and began production in 1946. Derived from the IS-2 and part of the IS tank family the IS-4 featured a longer hull and increased armor. With the IS-3 already in production, and when sluggish mobility and decreased need for tanks (particularly heavy tanks) became an issue, many were sent to the Russian Far East with some eventually becoming pillboxes along the Chinese border in the 1960s. Less than 250 were produced.

=== Object 730 IS-5 ===
The IS-5 is one of the many designations given to what would ultimately become the T-10 tank.

=== Object 252/253 IS-6 ===
There existed two different IS-6s: the Object 253 was an attempt to develop a practical electrical transmission system for heavy tanks. Similar systems had been tested previously in France and the United States and had been used with limited success in the German Elefant/Ferdinand tank destroyer during World War II. The experimental transmission proved unreliable and was dangerously prone to overheating, and development was discontinued. The alternative Object 252 shared the same hull and turret as the Object 253, but used a different suspension with no return rollers, and a conventional mechanical transmission. The design was deemed to offer no significant advantages over the IS-2, just the reload time was less, and the IS-6 project was halted.

=== Upgraded version of IS-6 ===
Since the IS-6 proved to have no significant advantages over IS-2 and its rival IS-4, in November 1944, it was decided to dramatically upgrade the tank. The project was called "Object 252U" (U stands for "Improvement" in Russian). The tank featured heavily sloped pike-nose armor, a new 122 mm D-13T gun, and more slope on the sides and rear. The design proved to be problematic in terms of crew comfort since the interior was too cramped and the design was cancelled.

=== Object 260 IS-7 ===
The IS-7 heavy tank design began in Leningrad in 1945 by Nikolai Fedorovich Shashmurin and was developed in 1948. Weighing 68 tonnes, thickly armoured and armed with a 130 mm S-70 long-barrelled gun, it was the largest and heaviest member of the IS family.

=== Object 730 T-10 IS-8 ===
The IS-8 (also known as Objekt 730) was the final development of the KV and IS tank series. It was accepted into service in 1952 as the IS-8, but due to the political climate in the wake of Stalin's death in 1953, it was renamed T-10, as it was the tenth heavy tank in Soviet service.

The biggest differences from its direct ancestor, the IS-3, were a longer hull, seven pairs of road wheels instead of six, a larger turret mounting a new gun with fume extractor, an improved diesel engine, and increased armour. General performance was similar, although the T-10 could carry more ammunition.

T-10s (like the earlier tanks they replaced) were deployed in independent tank regiments belonging to armies, and independent tank battalions belonging to divisions. These independent tank units could be attached to mechanized units, to support infantry operations and perform breakthroughs.

The T-10M is the final iteration of this type. It featured a longer gun barrel than previous models with 5-baffle muzzle brake and 14.5 mm machine gun. This was the last Soviet heavy tank to enter service. When the advanced T-64 MBT became available it replaced the T-10 in front line formations.

=== Comparisons ===
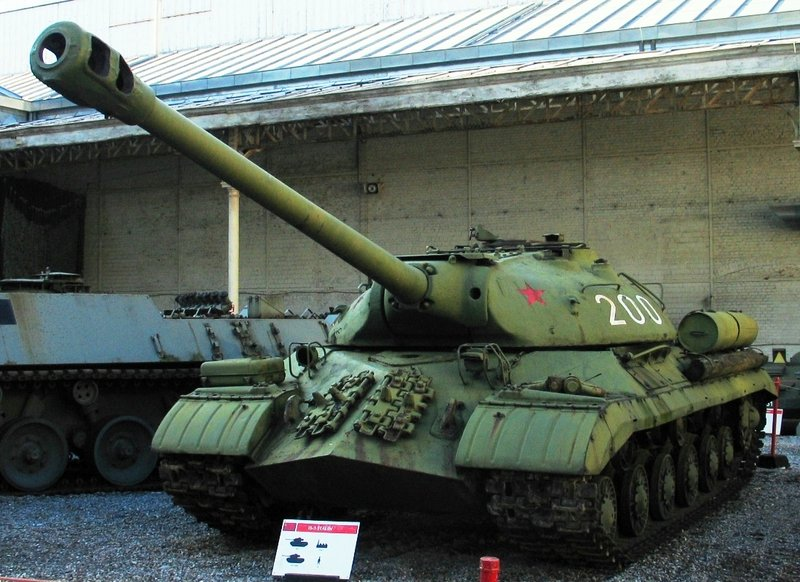
IS-3

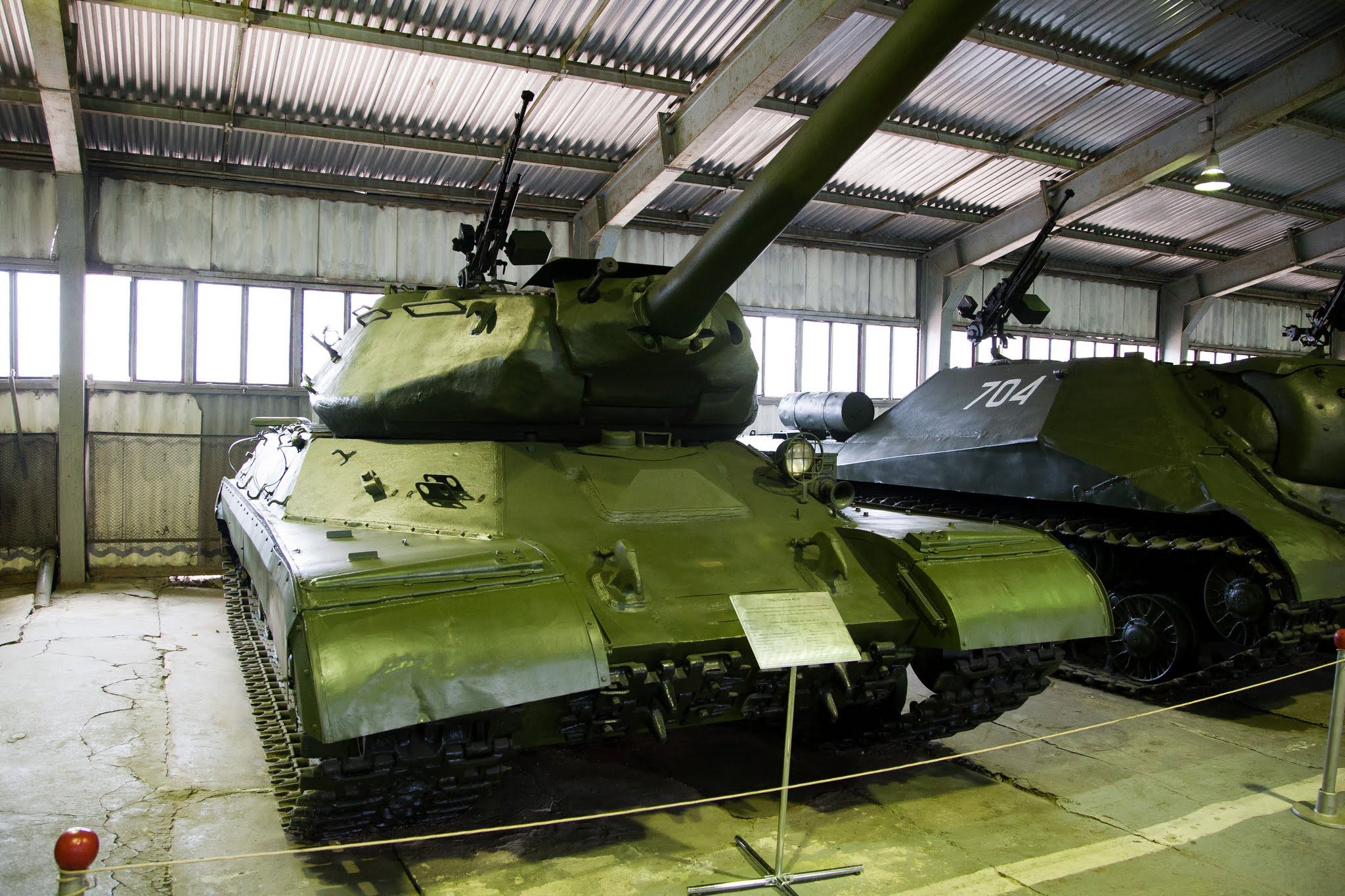
IS-4

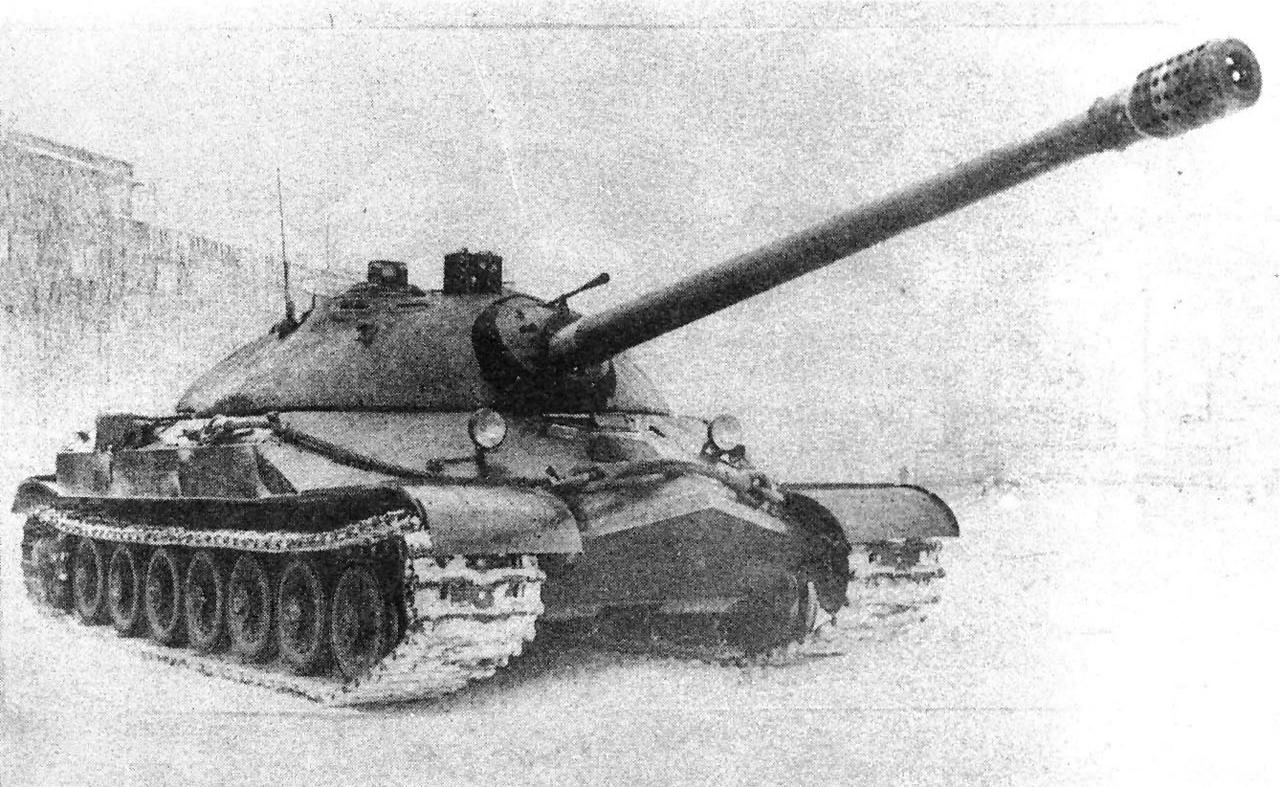
An IS-7 tank during trials (1948)

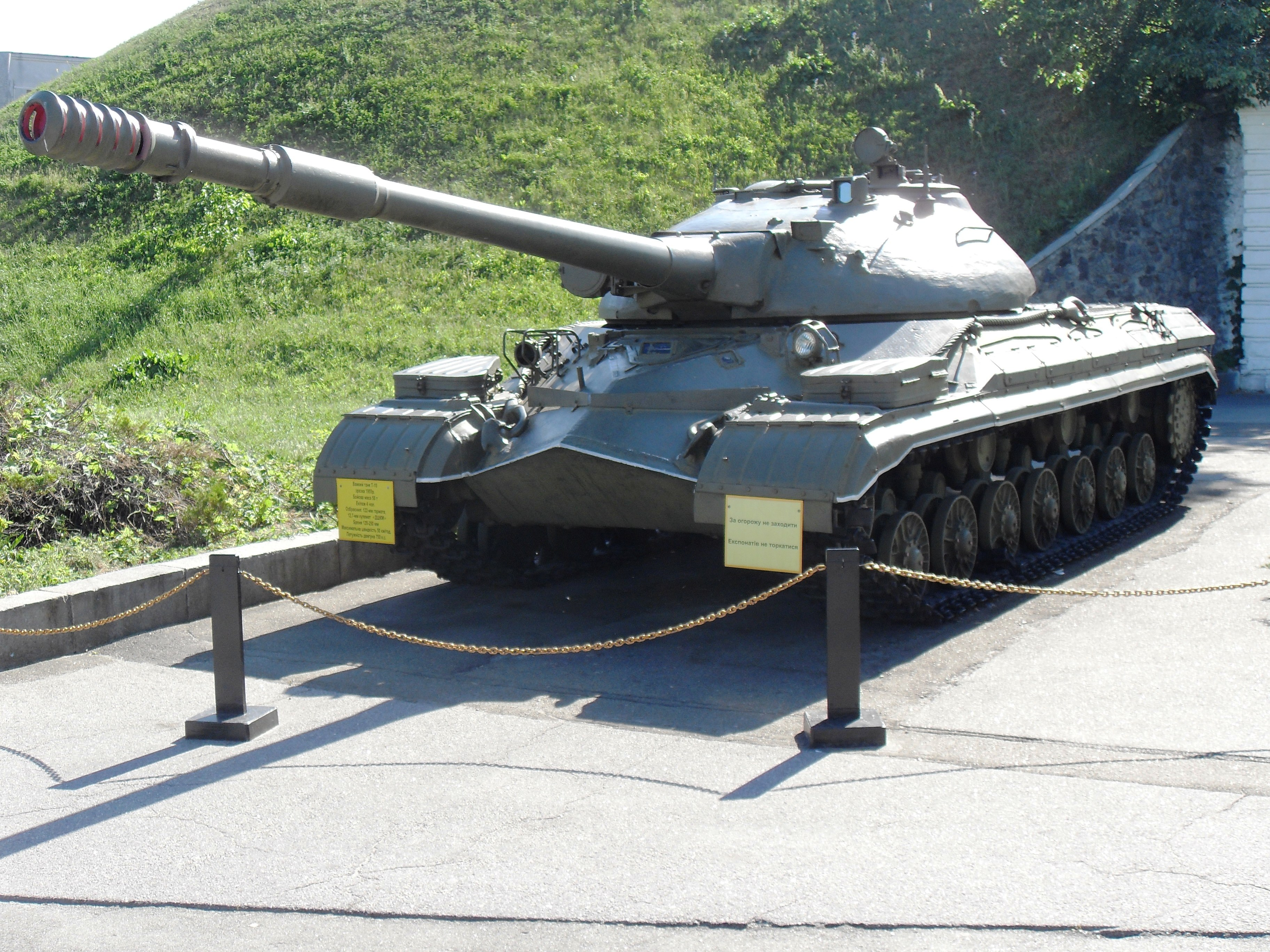
T-10M in the Museum of The History of Ukraine in World War II, Kyiv

Soviet heavy tanks of World War II
	T-35	T-100	SMK	KV-1 M1940	KV-1 M1941	KV-1 M1942	KV-1S M1942	KV-85 M1943	IS-2 M1945
Crew	11	7	7	5	5	5	5	4	4
Weight (tonnes)	45	58	55	43	45	47	42.5	46	46
Main armament	76.2 mm M. 27/32	76.2 mm L-11	76.2 mm L-11	76.2 mm F-32	76.2 mm F-34	76.2 mm ZiS-5	76.2 mm ZiS-5	85 mm D-5T	122 mm D-25T
Ammunition	100	–	–	111	111	114	114	70	28
Secondary armament	2×45 mm 5×7.62 mm	45 mm	45 mm	2×DT	4×DT	4×DT	4×DT	3×DT	3×DT, DShK
Engine	500 hp M-17M gasoline	500 hp	850 hp AM-34	600 hp V-2K diesel	600 hp V-2	600 hp V-2	600 hp V-2	600 hp V-2	600 hp V-2
Fuel (litres)	910	–	–	600	600	600	975	975	820
Road speed (km/h)	30	35	36	35	35	28	45	40	37
Road range (km)	150	–	150	250	250	250	380	350	240
Cross-country range (km)	70	–	70	150	150	150	240	220	180
Armor (mm)	11–30	20–70	20–60	25–75	30–90	20–130	30–82	30–160	30–160

== Combat history ==
The IS-2 entered combat in World War II during the first months of 1944. The Soviets produced significant numbers of the type (close to 4,000) and deployed them against the most advanced German designs of the time, notably the Tiger I, Tiger II, and Panther, as well as against Elefant tank destroyers. The IS-2 was best used for bunker assault using its high-explosive ammunition, as its reload rate, just 2 rounds per minute, made it ineffective as a tank destroyer. The IS-3 saw service on the Chinese-Soviet border, the Soviet invasion of Hungary, the Prague Spring and on both sides of the Six-Day War. However, the mobility and firepower of medium-tanks and the evolution of the main battle tank rendered heavy tanks obsolete.

== Variants ==
KV-85
A stopgap model built from a modified KV-1S hull mated to an Object 237(IS-1)'s turret and armed with the 85 mm D-5T.
IS-1K
(1942) The first prototype of the IS-1 tank, which was made in two copies in 1942. The turret was from an experimental KV-9 tank, which did not go into mass production. But the high military command decided that the turret and gun of the KV-9 tank were too outdated. As a result, a new turret had to be designed for the new gun.
IS-85 (IS-1)
1943 model armed with an 85 mm gun. When IS-2 production started, many were re-gunned with 122 mm guns before being issued.
IS-100
A prototype version armed with a 100 mm gun; it went into trials against the IS-122 which was armed with a 122 mm gun. Though the IS-100 was reported to have better anti-armor capabilities, the latter was chosen due to better all-around performance.
IS-122 (IS-2 model 1943)
1943 model, armed with A-19 122 mm gun (later adopted as the D-25T gun). Production ended after World War II.
IS-2 model 1944
1944 improvement with D-25T 122 mm gun, with faster-loading drop breech and new fire control, and improved frontal hull armour using thinner armour with a more efficient shape.
IS-2M
1950s modernization of IS-2 tanks.
IS-3
1944 armor redesign, with new rounded turret, angular front hull casting, integrated stowage bins over the tracks. Internally similar to IS-2 model 1944 and produced concurrently. About 350 built during the war.
IS-3M
(1952) Modernized version of IS-3. Fitted with additional jettisonable external fuel tanks and improved hull welding.
IS-4
1944 design, in competition against the IS-3. Longer hull and thicker armor than IS-2. About 250 were built, after the war.
IS-6
Prototype with an experimental electrical transmission. Chassis tested further with a conventional transmission after failure of the experimental system, but not deemed a significant enough improvement over existing heavy tank designs to warrant mass production.
IS-7
1946 prototype, only three built. The IS-7 model 1948 variant had a weight of 68 metric tons and it was armed with the 130 mm S-70 naval cannon (7020 mm long barrel). The assisted loader can achieve up to 8 rounds per minute. Other equipment included stabilizers, infrared night scopes, and 8 machine guns. The hull armor was 150 mm placed at 50~52 degree angles. On the turret, the frontal thickness was 240–350 mm at an angle of 45-0 degrees. The IS-7 had a crew of five, with the driver in the hull, the commander and gunner in the front of the turret, with both loaders in the rear of the turret. A Slostin machine gun was to be installed as its AA armament.
IS-8 (T-10)
1952 improvement with a longer hull, seven pairs of road wheels instead of six, a larger turret mounting a new gun with fume extractor, an improved diesel engine, and increased armor. Renamed T-10 as part of the Destalinization of the Soviet Union in the 1950s.

== Operators ==
China

- People's Liberation Army: 60 IS-2s delivered in 1950–1951. Operated during the Korean War and in concrete bunkers along the Sino-Soviet border.

Cuba

- Cuban Army: 41 IS-2Ms delivered in 1960.

Czechoslovakia

- Czechoslovak Army: 8 IS-2/IS-2M in service between 1945 and 1960. Two IS-3 delivered in 1949 were used only for trials and military parades.

East Germany

- NVA: 60 IS-2 delivered 1956. Operated until 1963.

Egypt

- Egyptian Army: 100 IS-3M operated from 1956 to 1967, some in use in the Six-Day War 1967.

Nazi Germany

- Wehrmacht: Captured one or two IS-2 in May 1945.

Hungary

- Hungarian People's Army: 68 IS-2s in service between 1950 and 1956. After the crackdown of the Hungarian Revolution of 1956 all were returned to the Soviet Union.

Israel

- IDF: Three IS-3M captured from Egypt in 1967. Reused as indirect fire artillery on the Sinai's Bar Lev line and as fixed turret bunkers fortifications along the Jordan Valley frontier.

North Korea

- Korean People's Army: Small number of IS-2s; never deployed in combat in the Korean War.

Poland

- Polish People's Army: Approximately 71 IS-2s used in combat between 1944 and 1945. 180 IS-2s survived as of 1955 and remained in service until the 1960s; some later were converted to armoured recovery vehicles. Two IS-3s were bought in 1946 for trials only.

Romania

- Romanian Land Forces: One IS-2 captured during clashes on the Romanian border between 28 May and 7 June 1944. The tank was subsequently exhibited in Bucharest.

South Ossetia

- South Ossetian Army: Operated some IS-2s, IS-3s and T-10s until 1995.

USSR

- Red Army / Soviet Army: Operated starting in 1944; phased out of service in the early-1970s.

Novorossiyan rebels

- One IS-3, previously displayed on a pedestal in the village of Aleksandro-Kalynove near Kostiantynivka as a World War II memorial, used in combat by the Novorossiyan Armed Forces in the 2014 pro-Russian unrest in Ukraine. Kostiantynivka was retaken by Ukrainian forces on 7 July 2014, along with the IS-3.

== Surviving vehicles ==
There are several surviving IS series tanks, with examples found at the following:

IS-2

- Os. Górali [standing tank], Kraków, Poland
- Polish Army Museum, Warsaw, Poland
- Museum of Arms in Fort Winiary, Poznań, Poland
- Museum of Armoured Weapon in Training Center of Land Forces, Poznań, Poland (operational)
- Tank Museum of the People's Liberation Army, Beijing, China
- Liberty Park, Overloon, The Netherlands
- Museum of The History of Ukraine in World War II, Ukraine
- Kurzeme Fortress Museum, Zante, Latvia
- Diorama Battle of Kursk, in Belgorod, Russia
- The American Heritage Museum, Greater Boston, United States
- Army Technical Museum, Lešany, Czech Republic (previously in Prague as a Monument to Soviet tank crews)
- Orvidai Homestead - Museum, Kretinga, Lithuania

IS-2M

- Imperial War Museum Duxford, England
- Kubinka Tank Museum, Russia
- Victory Park (Park Pobedy - Парк Победы), Ulyanovsk, Russia
- Victory Park at Poklonnaya Gora, Moscow, Russia

IS-3

- IDF Armoured Corps Museum, Israel
- Museum of Armoured Arms, Training Center of Land Forces, Poznań, Poland
- Army Technical Museum, Lešany, Czech Republic (operational)
- Polish Army Museum, Warsaw, Poland (Fort Czerniaków branch of the Museum)
- National Armor and Cavalry Museum, Fort Benning, Georgia, United States
- Victory Park in the northern part of Ulyanovsk, Russia
- Ulyanovskoe SVU, Ulyanovsk, Russia
- Military Glory Museum, Gomel, Belarus
- Diorama Battle of Kursk, in Belgorod, Russia
- At least one IS-3 was used by the separatist government in Donbas before being captured by Ukrainian forces.

IS-3M

- Egyptian National Military Museum, Cairo Citadel, Egypt
- Military Vehicle Technology Foundation, California, United States
- Royal Museum of the Armed Forces and of Military History, Brussels, Belgium (still operational)

IS-4

- Kubinka Tank Museum, Russia

IS-7

- Kubinka Tank Museum, Russia

=== Gallery ===
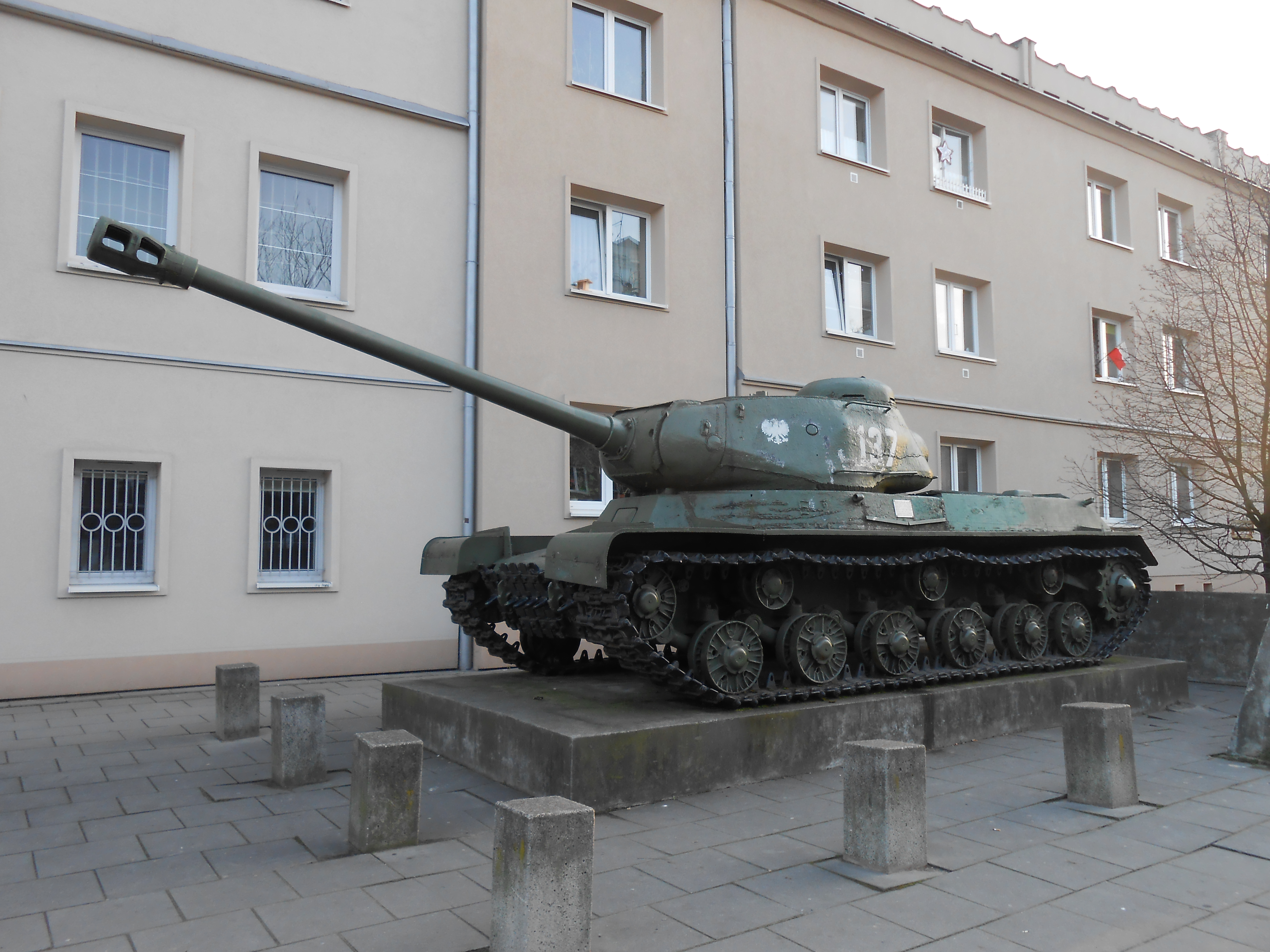
IS-2

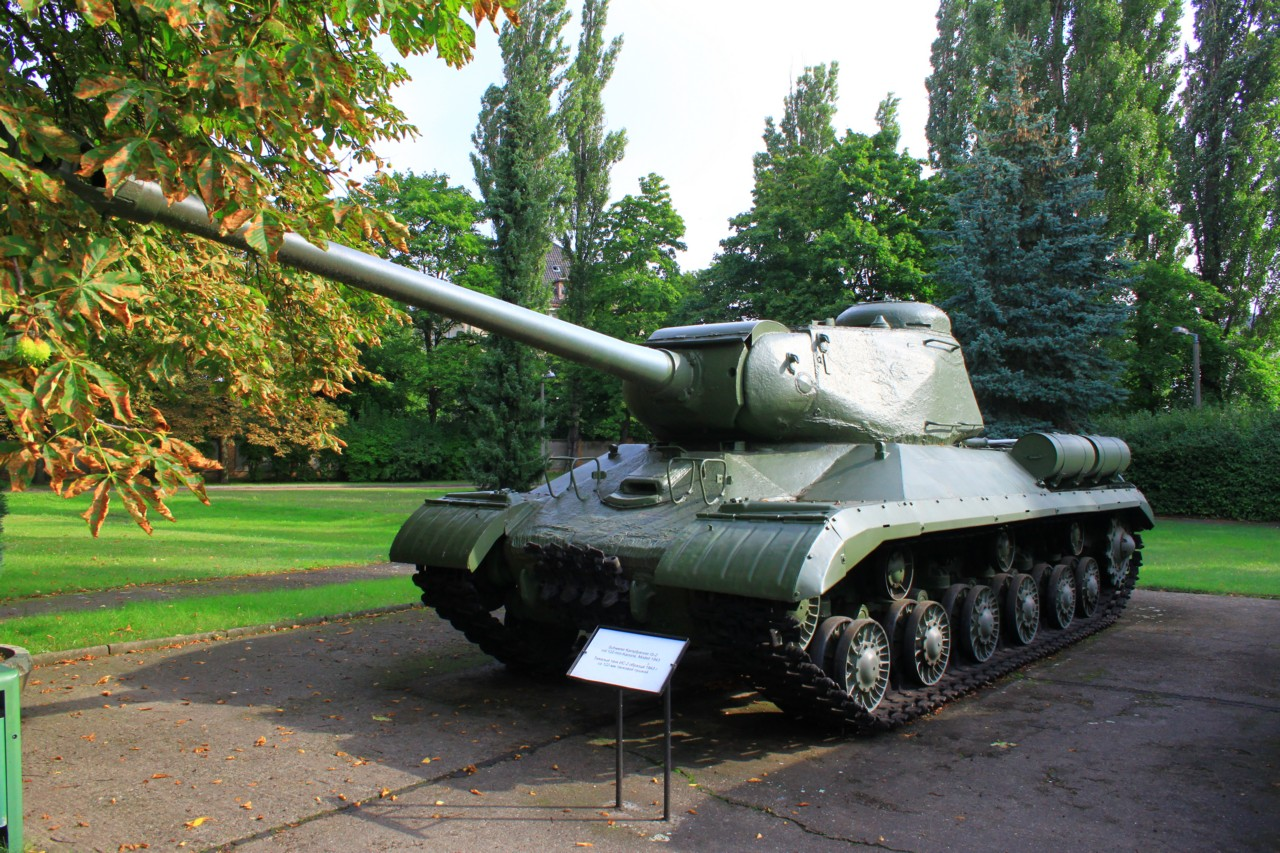
IS-2M

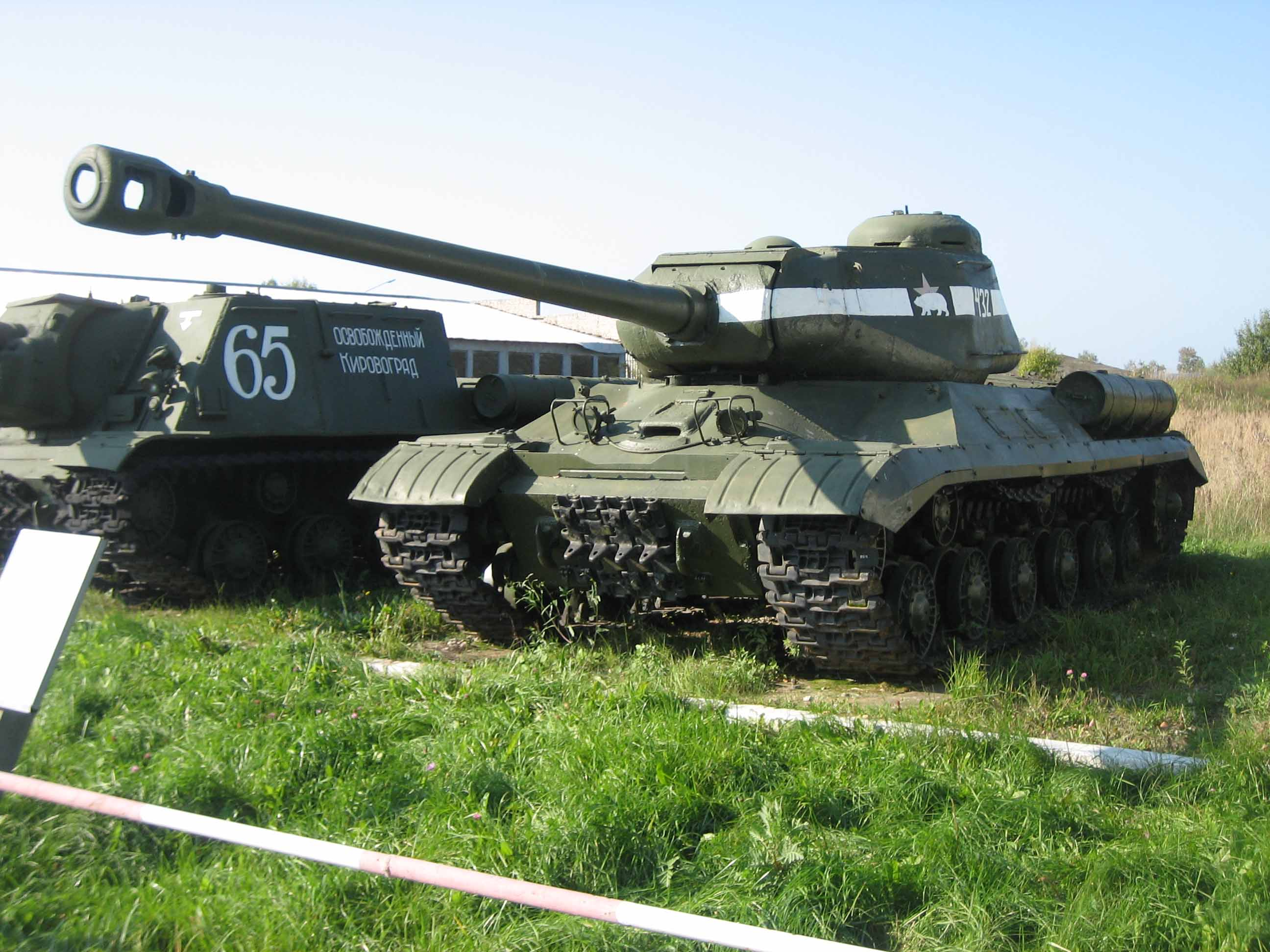
IS-2M at the Kubinka Tank Museum

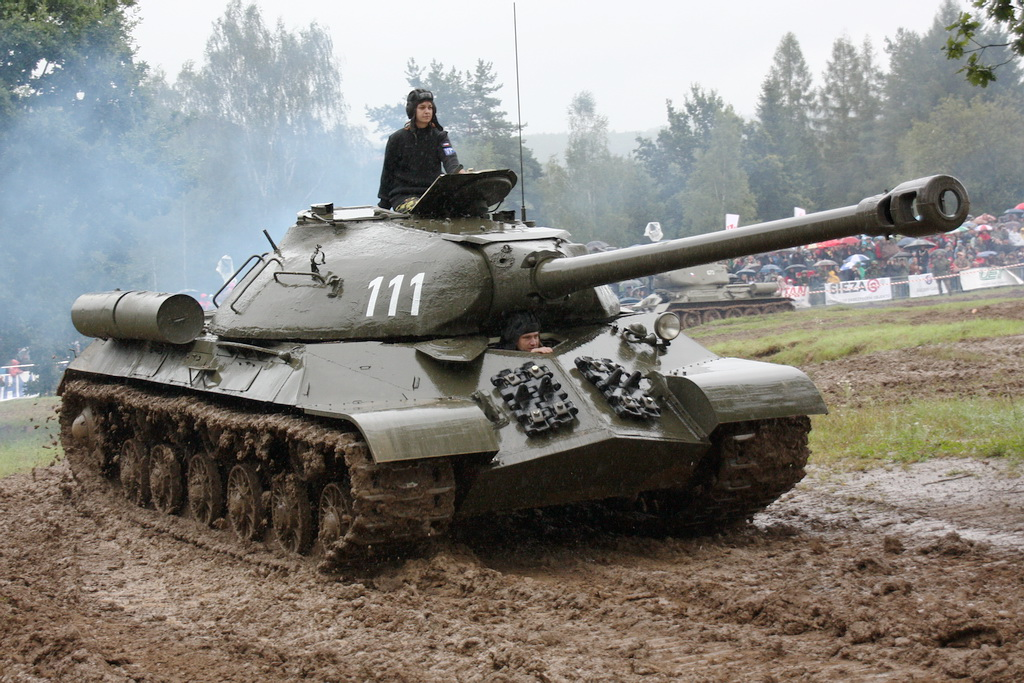
The IS-3 at the Military Technical Museum Lešany

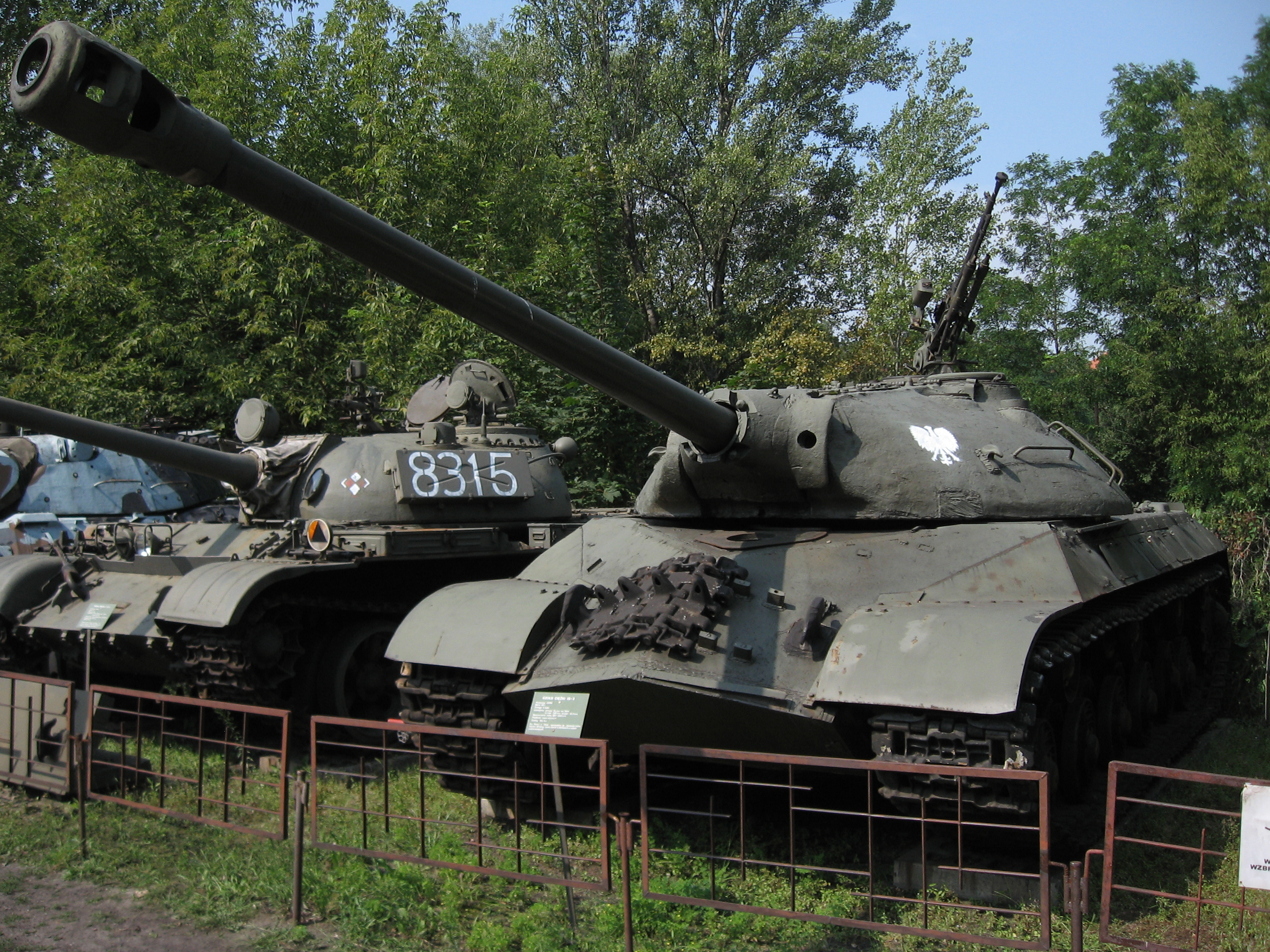
IS-3 heavy tank at the Museum Polskiej Techniki Wojskowej in Warsaw

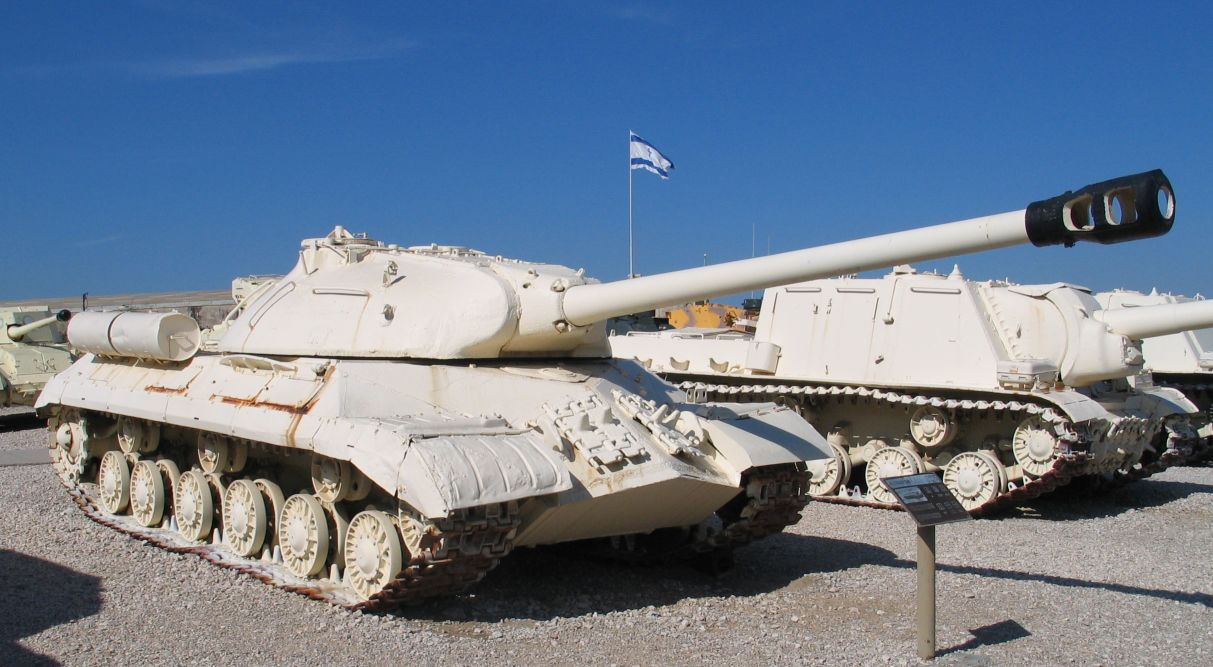
Former Egyptian Army IS-3M

== See also ==
- KV-1 heavy tank
- T-10 heavy tank
- ISU-152 assault gun
- ISU-122 assault gun
- List of Soviet tanks
- March of the Soviet Tankmen

== Sources ==
- Baryatinsky, Mikhail (2006). The IS Tanks. Hersham, Surrey: Ian Allan Publishing. ISBN 0711031622; (13)9780711031623
- Glantz, David M.; House, DJonathan M. (2015). When Titans Clashed. How the Red Army Stopped Hitler (revised and expanded (Kindle) ed.). University Press of Kansas. ISBN 978-0-7006-2152-1.
- Jentz, Thomas (1995). Germany's Panther Tank: The Quest for Combat Supremacy. Atglen, PA: Schiffer Publishing. ISBN 0-88740-812-5
- Jentz, Tom; Doyle, Hillary (1993). Tiger 1 Heavy Tank 1942–45. illustrated by Sarson, Peter. Osprey. ISBN 978-1-85532-337-7.
- Perrett, Bryan (1987). Soviet Armour Since 1945. London: Blandford Press. ISBN 0-7137-1735-1.
- Sewell, Stephen ‘Cookie’ (2002). “Red Star – White Elephant?” in Armor, July–August 2002, pp 26–32. Fort Knox, KY: US Army Armor Center. ISSN 0004-2420
- Zaloga, Steven (1994). IS-2 Heavy Tank 1944-1973. Osprey Publishing. ISBN 978-1-85532-396-4.
- Zaloga, Steven (1996). KV-1 & 2 Heavy Tanks 1939–1945. Osprey Publishing. ISBN 978-1-8553-2496-1.
- Zaloga, Steven; Grandsen, James (1984). Soviet Tanks and Combat Vehicles of World War Two. London: Arms and Armour Press. ISBN 0-85368-606-8.
