= IS-3 =

1940s Soviet heavy tank

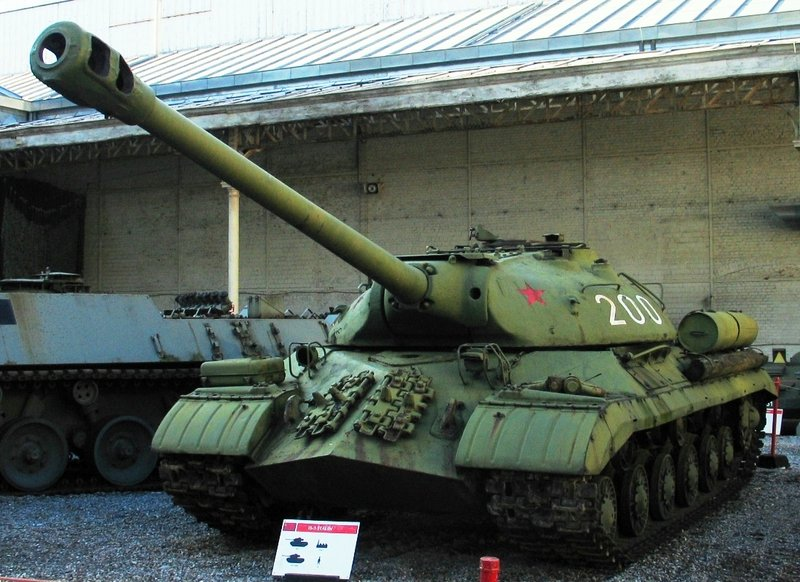
- IS-3 tank in a museum in Brussels
- Type: Heavy tank
- Place of origin: Soviet Union

Service history
- In service: 1945–1980s
- Used by: See Operators
- Wars: Hungarian Revolution; Six-Day War; Yom Kippur War; Russo-Ukrainian War

Production history
- Designed: 1944
- Manufacturer: Factory No.100 Kirovskiy Works
- Unit cost: 350,000 Rbls
- Produced: 1945–47
- No. built: 2,311
- Variants: IS-3M

Specifications
- Mass: 45,800 kg (101,000 lb)
- Length: 9.725 m (31.91 ft)
- Width: 3.07 m (10.1 ft)
- Height: 2.44 m (8 ft 0 in)
- Crew: 4 (commander/radio operator, gunner, loader, driver)
- Armor: 110 mm (4.3 in) at 55° (hull front); 90 mm (3.5 in) at 60° (upper sides); 25–45 mm (0.98–1.77 in) (roof); 20–35 mm (0.79–1.38 in) (floor); 60 mm (2.4 in) at 48° (rear); 250 mm (9.8 in) (turret front )
- Main armament: 122mm Gun D-25 (28 rounds)
- Secondary armament: 7.62mm DTM MG (coaxial, 1500 rounds); 1 × 12.7mm DShK MG (AA, 250 rounds)
- Engine: V-2-IS (V2K) V-12 water-cooled diesel 520 hp (390 kW) at 2000 rpm
- Power/weight: 11.35 hp/tonne (8.46 kW/tonne)
- Transmission: 4 forward, 1 reverse
- Suspension: torsion bar
- Ground clearance: 0.46 m (1 ft 6 in)
- Fuel capacity: 520 L (110 imp gal; 140 US gal)
- Operational range: 150 km (93 mi)
- Maximum speed: 37 km/h (23 mph)

The IS-3 (also known as Object 703) is a Soviet heavy tank developed in late 1944. Its semi-hemispherical cast turret (resembling that of an upturned soup bowl) became the hallmark of post-war Soviet tanks. Its pike nose design would also be mirrored by other tanks of the IS tank family such as the IS-7 and T-10. Produced too late to see combat in World War II, the IS-3 participated in the Berlin Victory Parade of 1945, the Soviet invasion of Hungary, the Six-Day War, Yom Kippur War, and one was used during the early stages of the Russo-Ukrainian War.

== Design and production ==
While the IS-2 tank proved to be capable of dealing with most German threats, anti-tank teams armed with Panzerfausts, Panzerschrecks, and PaK 40s proved dangerous since the Soviets used the IS-2 to break through areas weakly supported by tanks. The Soviets nonetheless conducted studies on tank losses, with engineers concluding that most of the hits occurred on the turret followed by hits on the frontal hull.

In late 1944, two tank design bureaus, one headed by Josef Kotin and his chief assistant A. S. Yermolayev from the old Factory No.100 in Leningrad, and Factory No.185 at Chelyabinsk led by N. L. Dukhov and M. F. Balzhi worked on designing a new tank to replace the IS-2. Both bureaus took different approaches, with the Kotin team using a turret similar to the IS-2, but with a radically redesigned hull, using welded plates to form what the engineers called the "eagle's beak", but referred to by the military as the "pike nose", which later would give the IS-3 the nickname "Shchuka" (pike). This design would receive several interim designations including Object 240, 240M, 244, 245, and 248. The Dukhov team on the other hand, opted for a new cast turret that resembled an inverted frying pan. This design was called by engineers as the "Pobeda" (victory) and given the factory designation Object 703. The IS-3 was a compromise, combining the Kotin chassis with the Dukhov turret while retaining the Object 703 factory designation. However the tank could not exceed the weight of the IS-2 tank (46 metric tons), requiring some redesigns to decrease the new tank weight. To solve this problem, the engineers cut the lower hull between the suspension torsion bars mountings and replacing with angled plates decreasing weight, but also weakening the stiffness of the hull, a flaw which would plague the IS-3 throughout its service life; and "folding" the upper part of the hull into a keystone shape providing extra protection without increasing weight: it was disguised with a flat sloped steel plate that joined the top of the hull to the edges of the fenders. The IS-3 chassis and turret gave it a low profile, but it also made difficult for the tank to take advantage of hull down positions since the shape of the turret limited gun depression.

Wartime production resulted in many mechanical problems and a hull weldline that had a tendency to crack open. According to Sewell, the IS-3 went through three major rebuilds and upgrades between 1949 and 1959 to correct these flaws.

The IS-3 came too late to see action in World War II. The first public demonstration of the IS-3 came on 7 September 1945 during the Allied victory parade on Charlottenburger Straße in Berlin, with the heavily reinforced 71st Guards Heavy Tank Regiment of the 2nd Guards Tank Army. Less than 30 tanks were built before the end of WWII, but by mid-1946, more than 2,300 tanks were built. Starting in 1960, the IS-3 was modernized as the IS-3M.

On paper the IS-3 was an improvement of the IS-2, with Western observers noting the ballistic shape of the turret and the thickness of the frontal armor, in reality the tank was considered by tank commanders as less reliable than its predecessor, with the IS-3 suffering from flexing and cracking of the hull welds, road wheels ball bearings that wore out prematurely, forcing the Soviets to upgrade and modernize the tank several times during its service life. The interior was also considerably more cramped in comparison to the IS-2 due the steeply sloped sides of the turret.

Developments in High-explosive anti-tank rounds and guided missiles during the late 1940s and 1950s rendered the heavy tank concept obsolete. By the late 1960s an 9M14 Malyutka missile or a T-54B tank using HEAT rounds could knock out any tanks that IS-3 or the T-10 could.

== Combat history ==
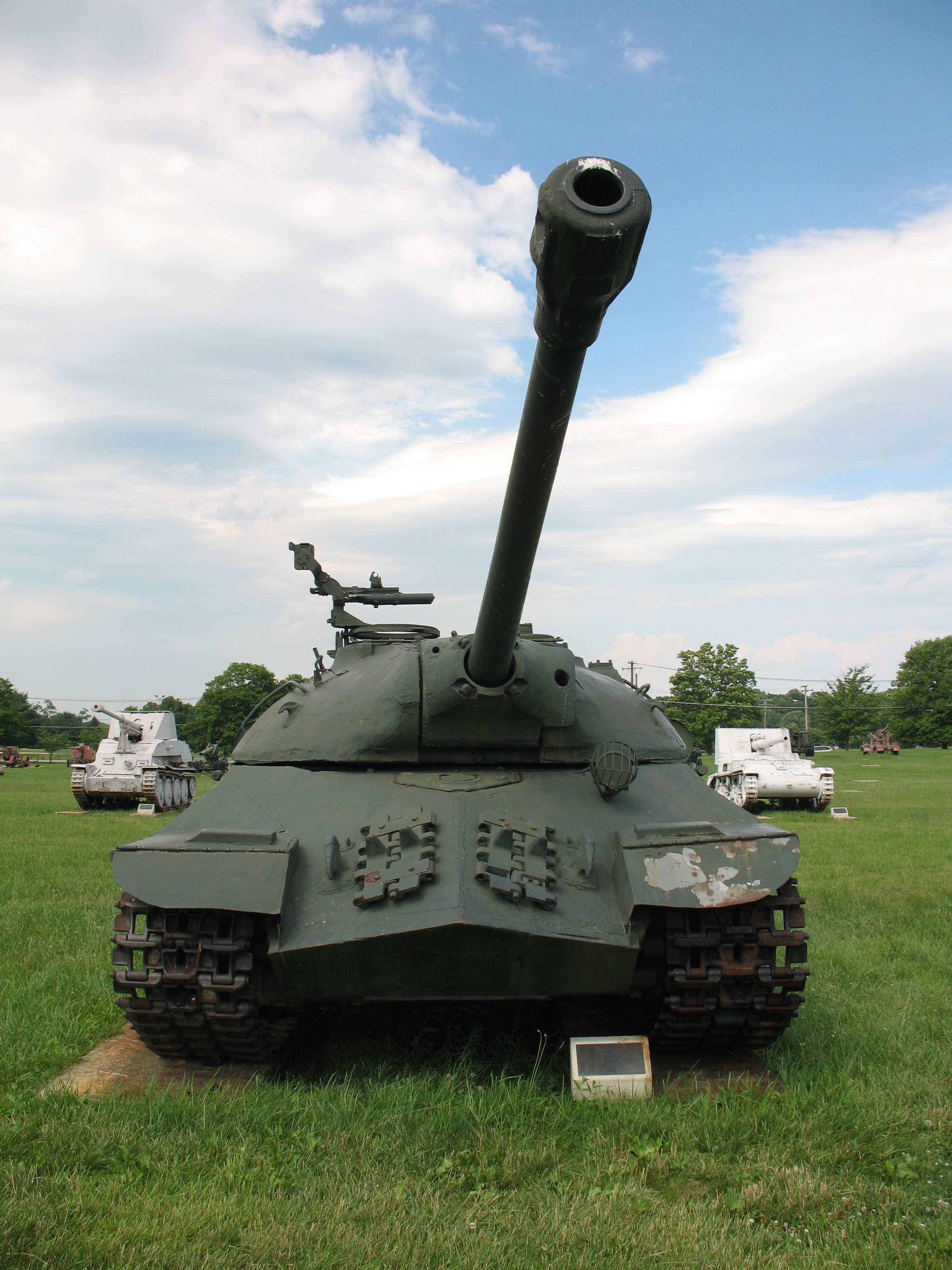
Frontal view of an IS-3. The squat solid-looking front profile and pike nose armor shape are highly distinctive. US Army Ordnance Museum, Aberdeen Maryland (2008)

Three pre-series vehicles were assigned to an independent Guards Battalion, but they arrived after the surrender documents were signed. They took part in the September 7, 1945, victory parade in Berlin under the 71st Guards Heavy Tank Regiment of the 2nd Guards Tank Army. Plans to use IS-3s in the Soviet invasion of Manchuria were shelved due to the tank's problems.

After retiring their IS-3M tanks during the 1970s and 1980s, the Soviets used most as targets for gunnery practice, while remaining vehicles and T-10 tanks were dug as static defensive positions in the Russian Far East region. Some of these tanks were still in running condition as late as of 1994. As late as of 2002, some of these pillboxes were still manned by machine gun artillery units according to Sewell.

=== Soviet Invasion of Hungary ===
The IS-3 was used in the 1956 Soviet invasion of Hungary, where a number of them alongside some ISU-152K assault guns were destroyed. According to a declassified CIA report, the Hungarian rebels used Molotov cocktails against Soviet tanks roaming through the streets of Budapest, killing their crews and when other tanks came in to help, the insurgents would often place a Hungarian flag or a white flag on the turret. These tanks were then fired on by other Soviet tanks.

=== Six-Day War ===
During the late 1950s, all IS-3s were modernized as IS-3M models. According to Zaloga, the Egyptian Army acquired about 100 IS-3M tanks from the Soviet Union, while Sewell gives a figure of 120 tanks. During the Six-Day War, a single regiment of IS-3M tanks was stationed with the Egyptian 7th Infantry Division at Rafah and the 125th Tank Brigade of the 6th Mechanized Division at Kuntilla was also equipped with about 60 IS-3M tanks. Israeli infantry and paratrooper units had considerable difficulty with the IS-3M when it was encountered due to its thick armor, which shrugged off hits from normal infantry anti-tank weapons such as the bazooka. Even the 90 mm AP shell fired by the main gun of the Israeli Defense Force (IDF) M48 Patton tanks could not penetrate the frontal armor of the IS-3s at normal battle ranges. There were a number of engagements between the M48A2 Pattons of the IDF 7th Armored Brigade and IS-3Ms supporting Egyptian positions at Rafah in which several M48A2s were knocked out in the fighting.

The IS-3M slow rate of fire and rudimentary fire controls proved to be a problem during direct tank engagements; poor handling of the tanks by Egyptian crews also played part for the dismal overall performance of the tank in the war. Zaloga notes that Israeli tankers were usually able to overcome the IS-3M through superior tactics and training and that Egyptian tanks were most dangerous when firing from ambush positions. About 73 IS-3s were lost in the 1967 war. Surviving tanks were regrouped into a single regiment which served as a reserve force during the Yom Kippur War. Most of the tanks captured by the IDF were converted into pillboxes (after having their engines removed) to reinforce the Bar-Lev Line, while a few vehicles were briefly put into service in the late 1960s. The IS-3M engine was poorly suited for the hot climate which made it unpopular with Israeli tankers; after the Yom Kippur War, surviving tanks were turned into stationary defensive pillbox emplacements in the Jordan River area.

=== Russo-Ukrainian War ===
In 2014, an IS-3 was captured by the Armed Forces of Ukraine near the city of Donetsk from pro-Russian rebels. According to Crowther, the Donetsk People's Republic (DPR) rebels repaired the tank, painted with the Russian slogans: 'To Kiev' and 'To Lvov', and drove it off from its plinth in the village of Oleksandro-Kalynove on 5 July 2014. The tank was driven (or transported) to the nearby city of Kostiantynivka. The main gun was non-operational so the DPR rebels bolted on a NSV heavy machine gun on the turret.

The tank was abandoned shortly before Ukrainian government forces retook Kostiantynivka on 8 July 2014. While it did not play a significant role during the fighting, it was used in DPR propaganda and in Russia, a commemorative coin depicting the event was issued.

== Models and variants ==
=== Soviet Union ===
IS-3
1944 armor redesign of the IS-2, with a new turret and hull, while the engine, transmission, suspension and armament remained the same. Between 1948 and 1952, it was upgraded with new road wheels, turret race, engine subframe mount, main clutch, oil pump, and radio increasing weight to 48.5 t (47.7 long tons; 53.5 short tons). Another interim upgrade between 1953 and 1955 focused on fixing the weak running gear.

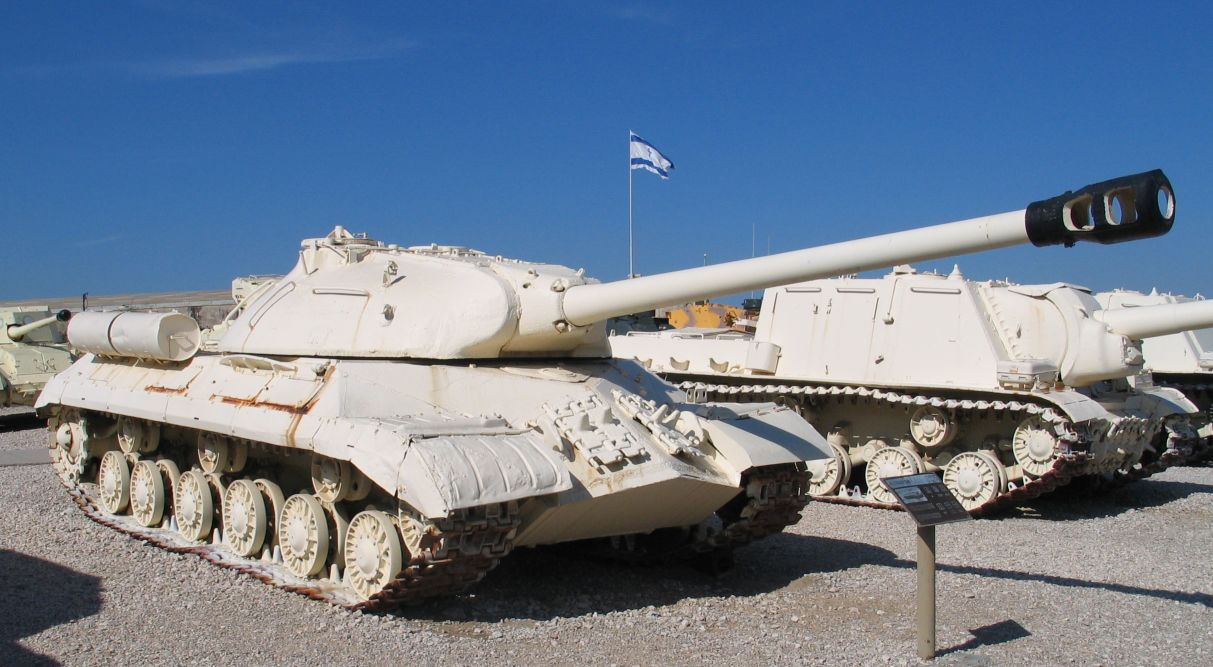
Former Egyptian Army IS-3M

IS-3M
In 1960, the IS-3 was modernized to the IS-3M standard. Improvements include: improved hull protection, a 12.7mm DShKM machine gun in place of the original DShK, a TVN-2 night vision device for the driver, replacement of the V-54K-IS engine, inclusion of the Mutlitsiklon air filter system, road wheels from the T-10 tank (which had improved ball bearings), improved external stowage and dust skirts added over the suspension.

=== Israel ===
The IDF pressed some captured IS-3M into service in the late 1960s, and attempted to extend the service life of these tanks by replacing the V-54-IS engine with the complete powerpack from the T-54A tank including the engine compartment with little success.

== Operators ==
=== Former ===
- China − Small numbers
- Egypt − 100 according to Zaloga, or 120 according to Sewell
- Israel − Captured Egyptian tanks. Surviving tanks were dug in as static fortifications near the Jordan river area
- North Korea − Approximately 100 tanks. Reportedly remained operational until the 1980s
- Russia − Some dug in tanks remained in service as late as 2002
- Soviet Union − Most were expended as targets for gunnery practice while remaining vehicles were dug in as static fortifications in the border with China during the 70s and 80s

=== Non-state former ===
- Donetsk People's Republic − One IS-3 was used by the pro-Russian separatists in 2014 before being abandoned.

=== Evaluation-only ===
- Czechoslovakia − One was used for parades after unsuccessful trials
- Poland − Two were obtained for trials, and ultimately rejected

== Surviving vehicles ==
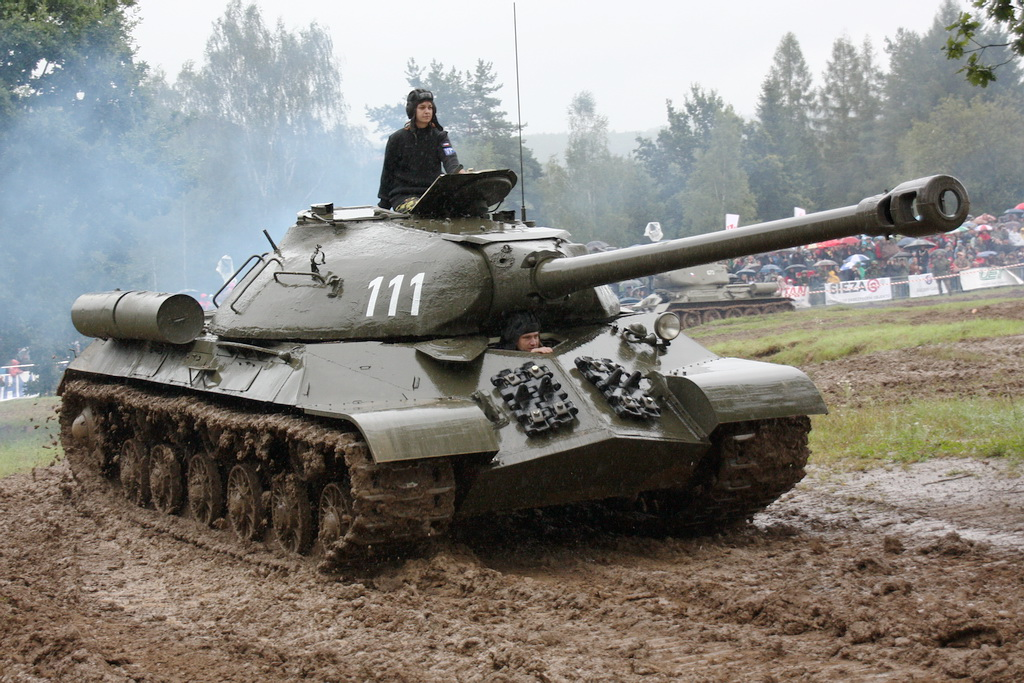
A restored IS-3 of the Military Museum Lešany, Czech Republic

- IDF Armoured Corps Museum, Israel.
- Museum of Armoured Arms, Training Center of Land Forces, Poznań, Poland (still operational)
- Army Technical Museum, Lešany, Czech Republic (operational).
- Polish Army Museum, Warsaw, Poland. (Fort Czerniaków branch of the Museum).
- National Armor and Cavalry Museum, Fort Moore, Georgia, United States.
- Victory Park in the northern part of Ulyanovsk, Russia.
- Ulyanovskoe SVU, Ulyanovsk, Russia
- Military Glory Museum, Gomel, Belarus.
- Diorama Battle of Kursk, in Belgorod, Russia.
- One IS-3 mounted on a memorial plinth in the village of Oleksandro-Kalynove was restored to running condition and used by DPR rebels in 2014. It was abandoned shortly before Ukrainian government forces retook the city Kostiantynivka. The Ukrainian Army captured the vehicle intact and after disarming it, put on display near the National Military History Museum in Kyiv.
- IS-3 re-engined with unknown replacement power plant restored and available for tourist rides Strategic Missile Forces Museum near Pobuzke, Ukraine.

IS-3M

- Egyptian National Military Museum, Cairo Citadel, Egypt.
- Military Vehicle Technology Foundation, California, United States.
- Bastogne barracks Museum, Bastogne, Belgium. (Still operational)

The following document lists 171 surviving IS-3 tanks, some of which are only partially surviving (only gun/turret/hull survives).

== See also ==
- KV-1
- ISU-122
- List of Soviet tanks

=== Tanks of comparable role ===
- Tiger II, German heavy tank
- Conqueror (tank), British heavy tank
- AMX 50, postwar French prototype heavy tank
- T29 Heavy Tank, American prototype
- T34 Heavy Tank, American prototype
- M103 Heavy tank, American heavy tank
