= Pike nose =

Frontal armour configuration on a vehicle

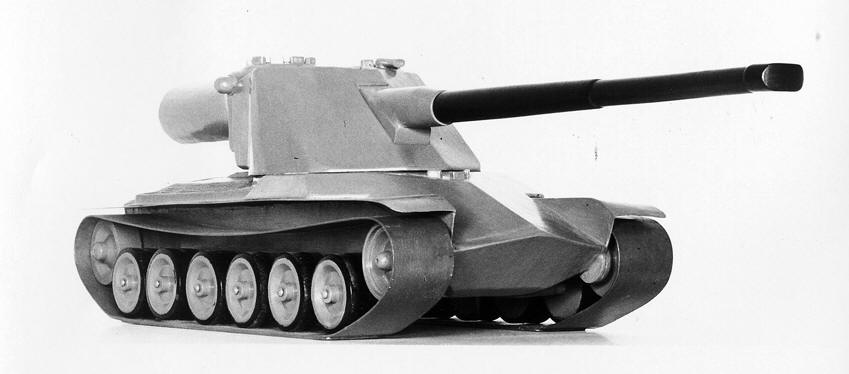
Swedish EMIL heavy tank mockup, clearly depicting the pike nose profile.

Collar insignia of the Russian Tank Troops, depicting a pike nosed tank (akin to the IS-3 and T-10).

A pike nose (from Russian: щучий нос) is a configuration of vehicle armour in which an armoured vehicle's frontal armour consists of three angular plates put together to form a cone-like shape, similar to the nose of a pike, from which the name stems. Often welded, it can also be cast. The design allows for very effective frontal angling of the armour plates, increasing protection from the front.

The pike nose has appeared on armoured vehicles since World War I, but the design gained popularity following World War II, with heavy tank designs such as the Soviet IS-3. Following the obsolescence of heavy tanks, however, the design has become rare in modern times, only rarely appearing on light vehicles.

== History ==
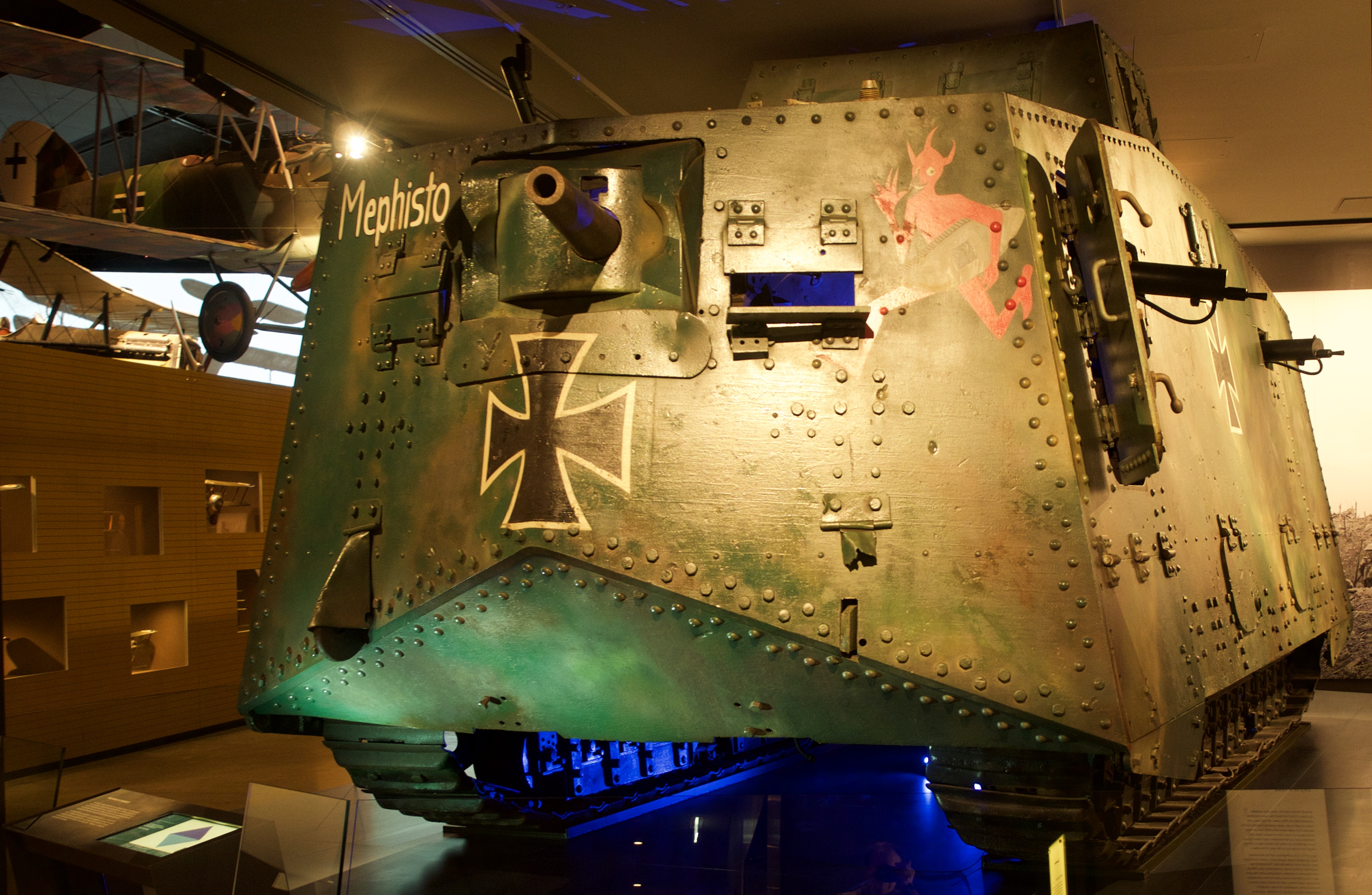
German A7V Sturmpanzerwagen of World War I, featuring a very "shallow" pike nose.

The first tank to feature a pike nose was the German Sturmpanzerwagen A7V of World War I. The sloping of its frontal armour plates was, however, subtle and not very "pike like". The first vehicles to feature a traditional pike nose were some of the concepts for the British Valiant tank of the early 1940s. These concepts were later altered to feature a cast dome on the upper front hull, which was retained on the single prototype produced.

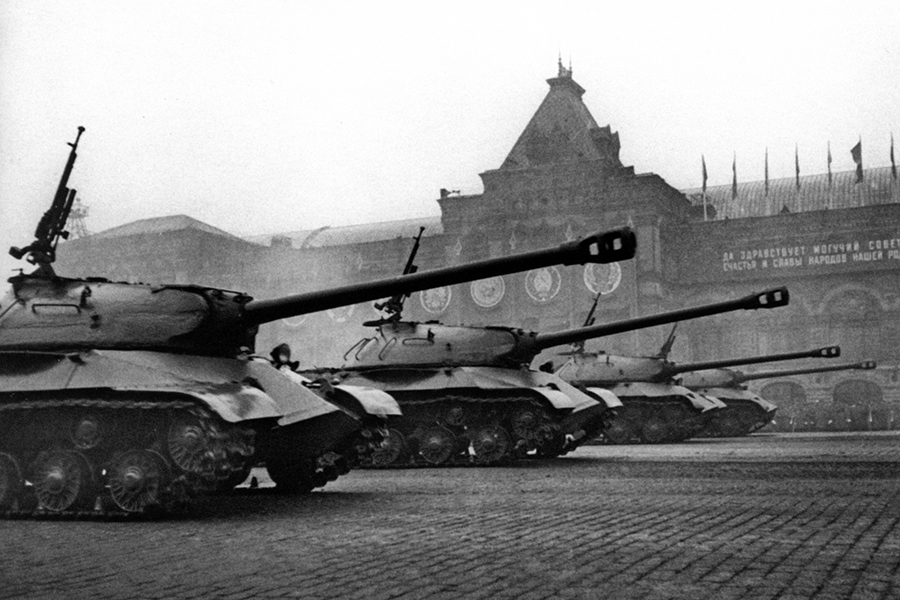
Soviet IS-3s at the Soviet Victory Parade on Red Square, 24 June 1945.

The first production tank to feature a conventional pike nose was the Soviet IS-3, which entered service in 1945 at the very end of WWII. The Soviet pike nose concept initially started with a revamped version of the IS-2 heavy tank from late 1944, known as the IS-2U, which eventually evolved into the IS-3. The IS-3 was arguably the most heavily protected tank of its time and came to popularize the concept of the pike nose to the rest of the world. The Soviets used the pike nose on several tank projects, such as the IS-7 and IS-8 heavy tank projects, the latter entering service as the T-10, but also on other projects, such as the Object 268 heavy assault gun.

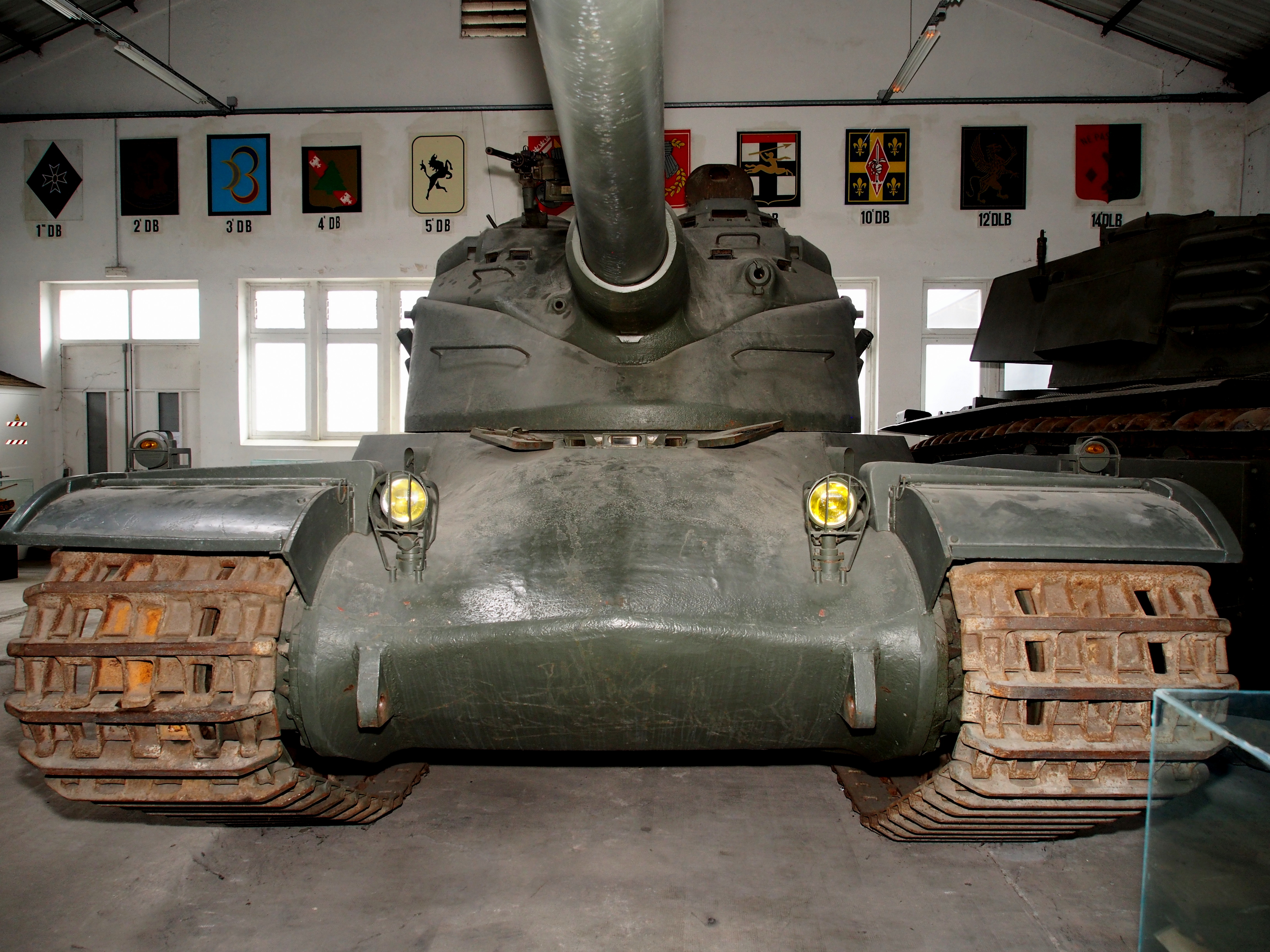
French AMX-50 Surbaissé heavy tank prototype at Musée des Blindés, featuring a cast pike nose.

In the post-war western world, the pike nose saw use on several tank projects. Most designs featured a welded pike nose like the Soviet IS-3 design, such as the French Lorraine 40t medium tank project and AMX-50 heavy tank project, the Swedish EMIL/KRV heavy tank project and the early British FV4201 Chieftain project. The Americans, however, favoured cast hull designs and introduced cast pike noses with the advent of the M48 Patton medium tank and M103 heavy tank. This design was soon picked up by the French and British, leading to cast noses for their ongoing tank projects, the French producing the AMX-50 Surbaissé variant with a proper cast pike nose and the British changing the final FV4201 Chieftain design to feature something similar to a cast pike nose, although flattened in the center.

Due to improved penetration performance against angular armour from modern anti-tank ammunition, however, the pike nose solution soon fell into obsolescence for heavy armour. The pike nose remains relevant for lightly armoured vehicle that need protection against small arms. A shallow pike nose was featured on the Swedish pbv 302 infantry fighting vehicle of the 1960s and a subtle pike nose was featured on the Swedish ikv 91 light assault gun of the 1970s.

== List of armoured fighting vehicles featuring pike nose ==
- 1918 – (German Empire) Sturmpanzerwagen A7V
- 1943 – (United Kingdom) Tank, Infantry, Valiant (A38)
- 1945 – (Soviet Union) IS-3
- 1946 – (Soviet Union) IS-7
- 1950 – (Switzerland) KW30/50 (Panzer 58 concept)
- 1951 – (France) Panhard EBR
- 1952 – (United States) M48 Patton (cast hull)
- 1952 – (France) Lorraine 40t
- 1954 – (Soviet Union) IS-8/T-10
- 1955 – (Sweden) EMIL/KRV
- 1955 – (France) AMX-50 Surblindé
- 1956 – (France) AMX-50 Surbaissé (cast hull)
- 1956 – (Soviet Union) Object 268
- 1957 – (United States) M103 (cast hull)
- 1957 – (United Kingdom) FV4201 Chieftain (early concepts)
- 1959 – (Soviet Union) Object 757
- 1964 – (China) WZ-111 Heavy Tank
- 1966 – (Sweden) Pansarbandvagn 302
- 1975 – (Sweden) Infanterikanonvagn 91

== Gallery ==
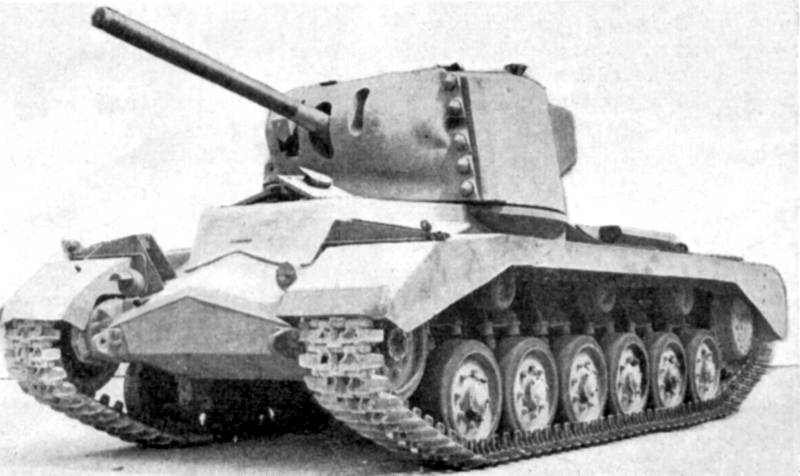
Valiant tank prototype with a cast dome on the upper pike nose.

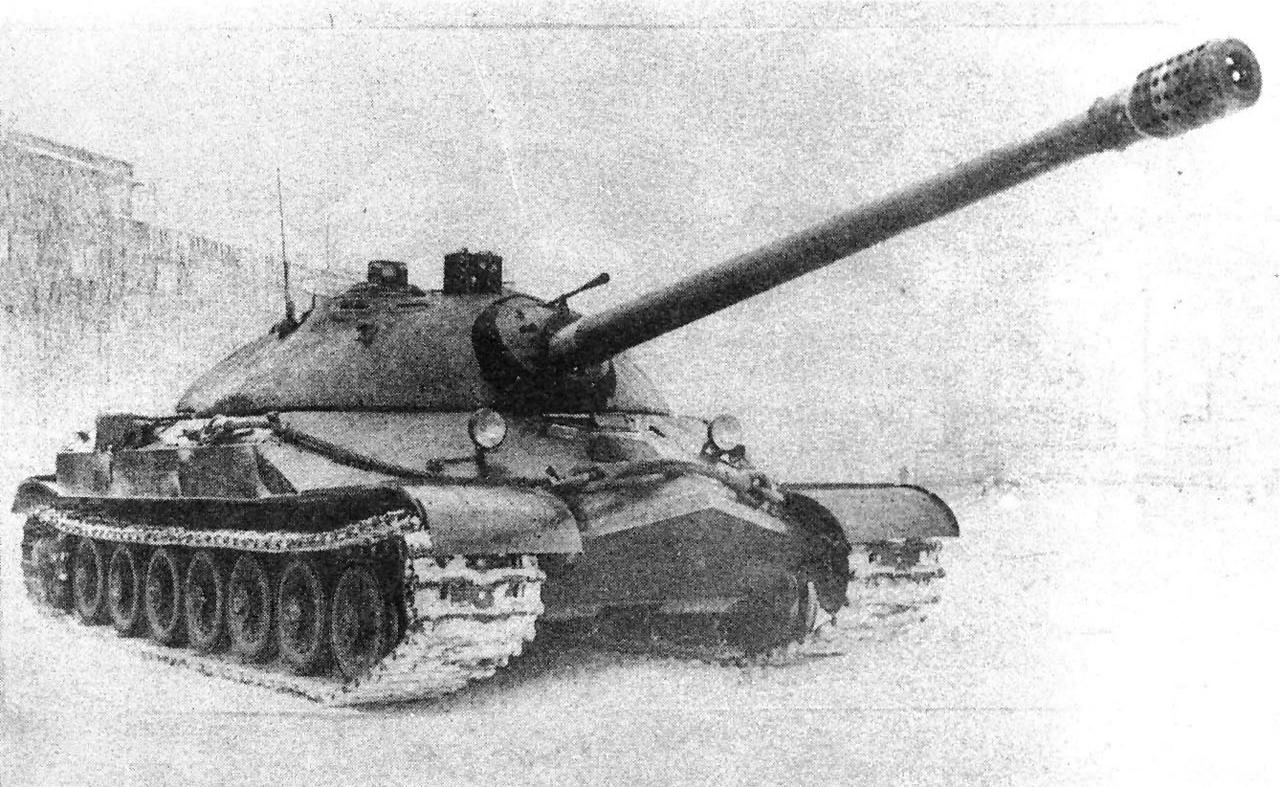
An IS-7 prototype during winter trials in 1948.

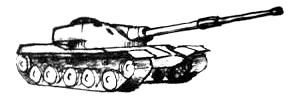
Early concept drawing of the FV4201 Chieftain featuring a pike nose.

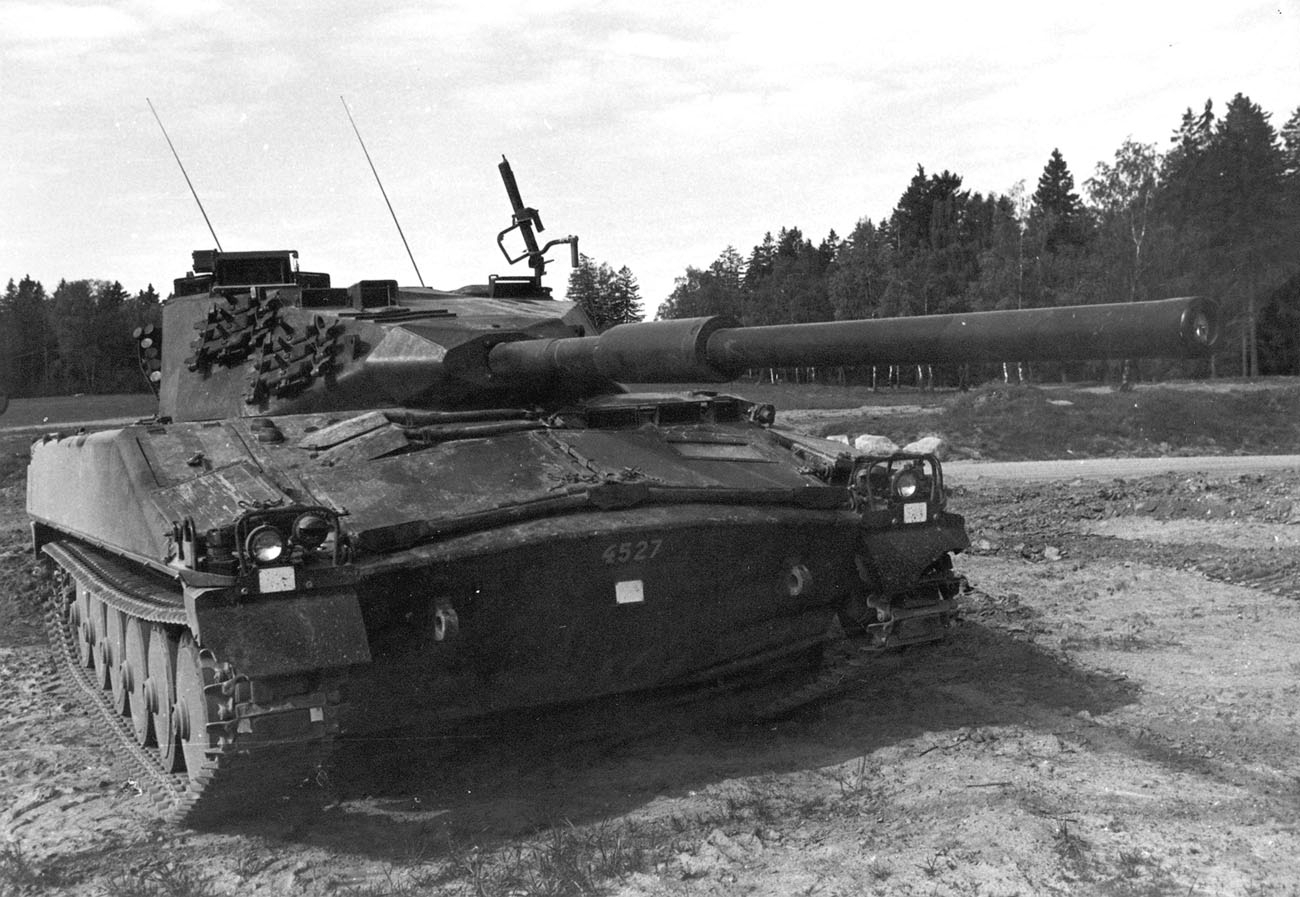
Swedish ikv 91 light assault gun with subtle pike nose.
