= Conqueror (tank) =

British heavy tank

FV 214 Conqueror
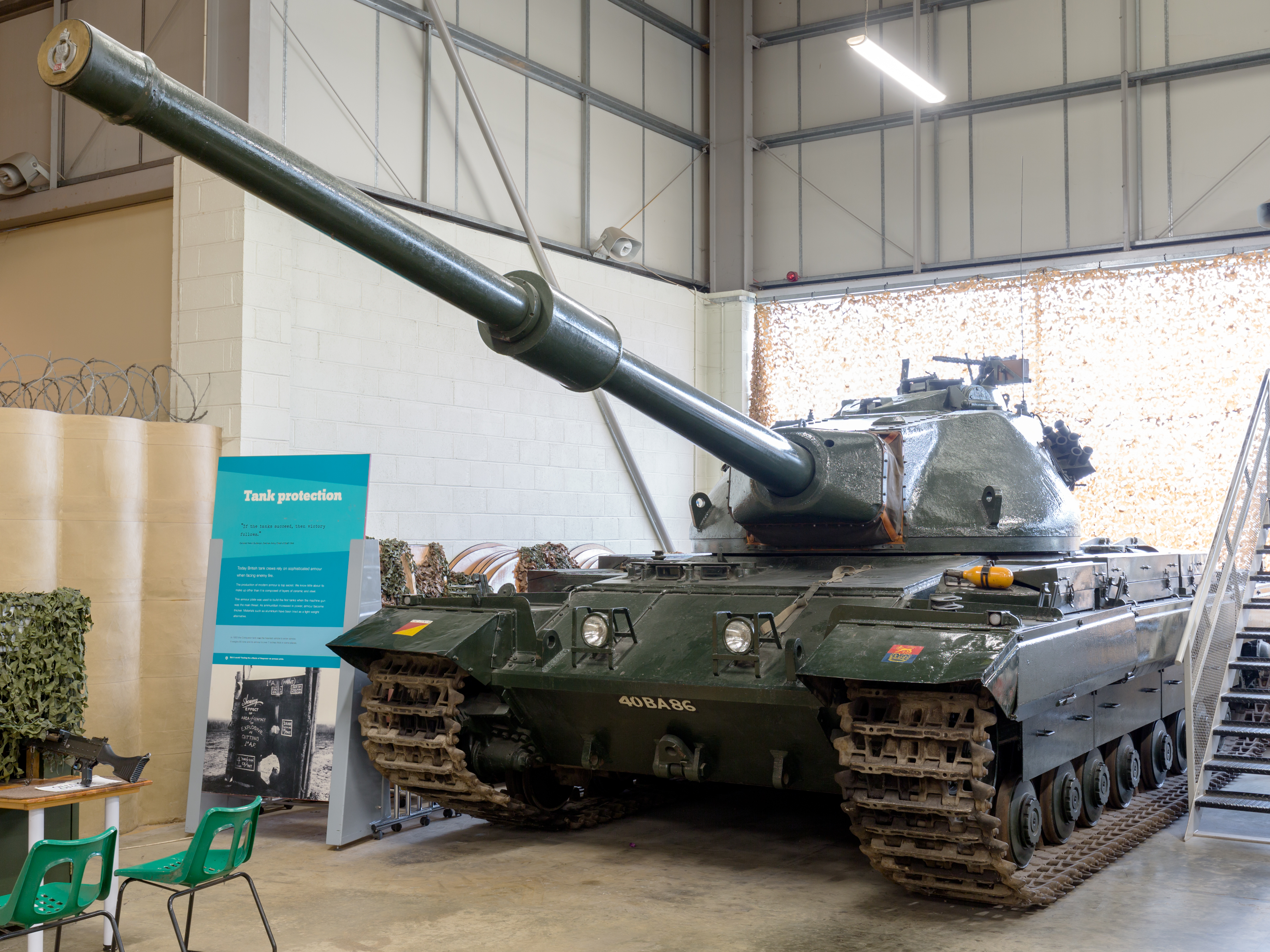
- Conqueror Mk I at The Tank Museum, Bovington (2008)
- Type: Heavy gun tank
- Place of origin: United Kingdom

Service history
- In service: 1955–1966 (only in West Germany)

Production history
- Designed: 1944
- Manufacturer: Royal Ordnance Factory, Dalmuir
- Produced: 1955–1959
- No. built: 185

Specifications
- Mass: 64 tonnes (71 short tons; 63 long tons)
- Length: 38 feet (12 m) gun forward, 25 feet 4 inches (7.72 m) hull
- Width: 13 feet 1 inch (3.99 m)
- Height: 10 feet 5 inches (3.18 m)
- Crew: 4
- Armour: 5 inches (130 mm) hull front, 13 inches (330 mm) turret front
- Main armament: L1 120 mm rifled gun
- Secondary armament: 2× L3A1 7.62 mm machine guns
- Engine: Rolls-Royce Meteor M120; 810 hp (604 kW)
- Power/weight: 12 hp/tonne
- Transmission: Five forward, two reverse gears
- Suspension: Horstmann suspension
- Fuel capacity: 221 Imp gal
- Operational range: 161 km (100 mi)
- Maximum speed: 35 km/h (22 mph)

The FV 214 Conqueror, also known as Tank, Heavy No. 1, 120 mm gun, Conqueror was a British heavy tank of the post-World War II era. It was developed as a response to the Soviet IS-3 heavy tank. The Conqueror's main armament, an L1 120 mm gun, was larger than the 20-pounder (83.4 mm) gun carried by its peer, the Centurion. The Conqueror's role was to provide long range anti-tank support for the Centurion. Nine Conquerors were issued for each regiment in Germany, usually grouped in three tank troops. In the British Army both the Conqueror and the Centurion were replaced by the Chieftain.

== Background ==
The Conqueror's origins trace back to the initiation of the A45 program in 1944, for a heavy infantry tank to complement the A41. This new design was to be based on that of the A41, sharing as many components as possible but in a larger and more heavily armoured vehicle. The A45 was to be fitted with a 20pdr gun, rather than the 17pdr on the A41, and had a design weight of 55 tons, with English Electric appointed as the main contractor. The original mild-steel Centurion hull, produced by AEC in 1944, was rebuilt and widened for use as a development vehicle, with the design work undertaken by the Department of Tank Design. In 1946 the project was re-designated FV200; it was reworked to fulfil the role of a 'Universal Tank', capable of serving as the platform for a variety of specialist vehicle types (self-propelled artillery, armoured personnel carrier, various armoured recovery vehicles, gun tractor etc.). The main gun tank of the series, the FV201, was to be armed with the 20 pounder. A mock-up of the A45 modified to meet the FV201 requirement was completed by June 1947, and the first prototype running by January 1948. Problems arose with the universal chassis concept as it was found the flail tank needed a longer hull and the gun tank fitted with amphibious 'swimming' gear would not fit on the Mark 8 Landing Craft Tank. In 1949, however, with the specialist variants being uneconomic due to escalating costs and the short production runs needed, (Note: Centurion and Churchill hulls would be used instead for Royal Engineer specialist vehicles) the Centurion was chosen for further development receiving the 20-pounder, and the FV201 vehicle was no longer being considered a match for newer Soviet types, the decision was made to shelve the program.

== Caernarvon ==
Despite the cancellation of the FV201 there was still a pressing need for a new heavy gun tank, now requiring a 120 mm armament. Due to the urgency of the situation with the Soviet IS-3 already in service the existing hull design was repurposed for the new specification, however it was estimated that the new turret would not be ready until at least 1954. In order to familiarise crews with the new tanks a production order was placed for the hulls, which in 1952 were combined with 20 pounder-armed Centurion Mk 3 turrets to produce the FV 221 Caernarvon Mark I. The Caernarvon was only used for chassis development work serving in troop trials. In 1955, the first pre-production Conquerors were produced and sent to BAOR for troop trials.

== Design ==
The new, larger-calibre gun design chosen for Conqueror was Royal Ordnance's "Ordnance, Quick Firing 120mm Tank L1", a British adaptation of the American M58 gun used on the US M103 heavy tank; using two-piece ammunition. The charge was not bagged but supplied in a brass cartridge, which offered some safety advantages, but reduced shell capacity to 35. APDS and HESH were the two types produced. A chain drive based system automatically carried the used cartridge after ejection to the rear and out of the turret. Secondary armament was provided in a pair of L3A1 machine guns, the British designation for the Browning M1919A4. One was mounted coaxially with the main gun while the other was fitted to the commander's cupola.

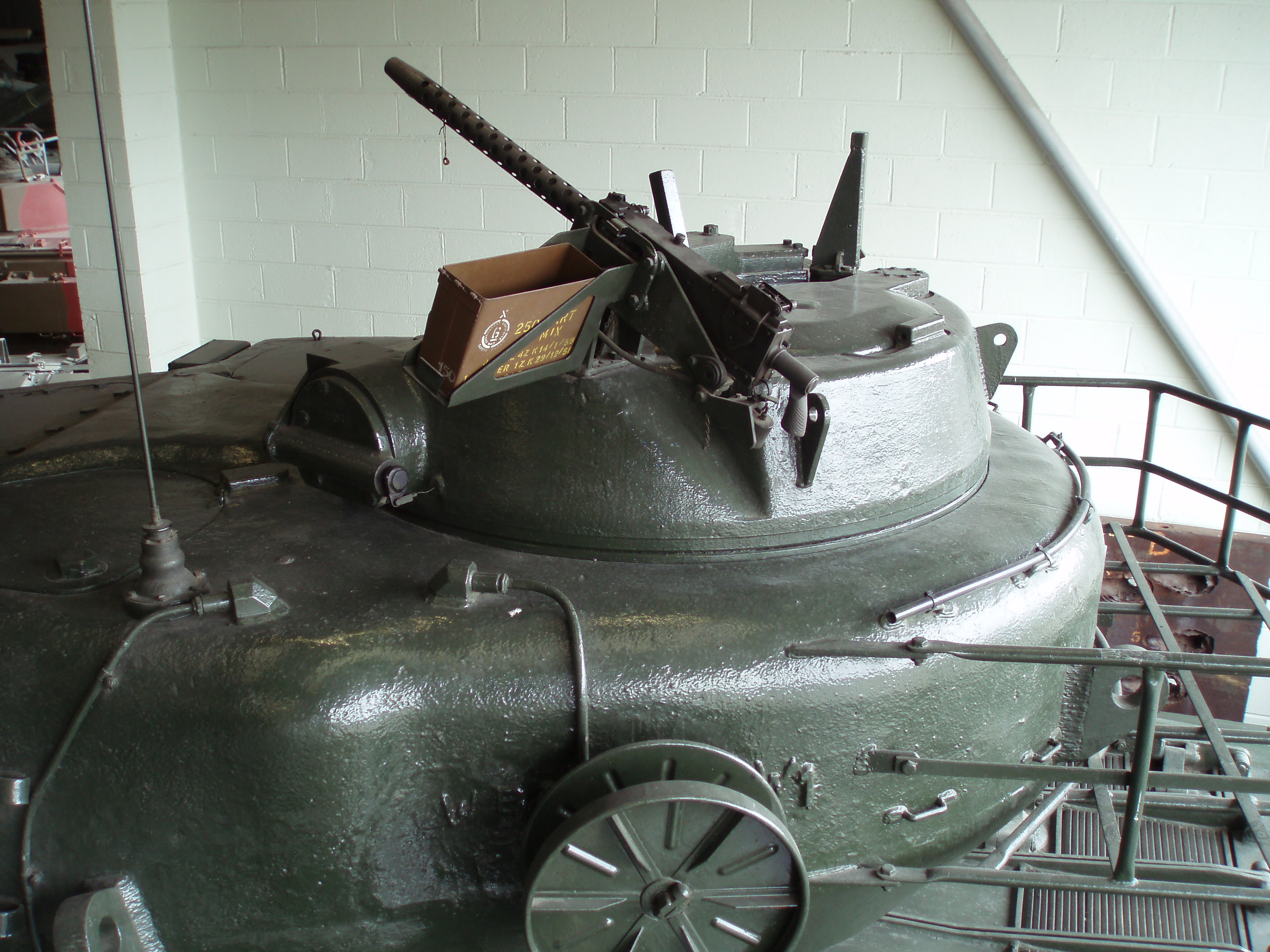
The rotating cupola of the Tank Museum's Conqueror

The armour was very heavy for the time, especially in the front, where it could be up to either 18.8 or 26.7 inches (480 – 680 mm) thick in the horizontal plane, depending on the source. Unfortunately, this, along with the weight of the huge turret required to house the large gun and the very large hull volume, made the vehicle very heavy, giving it a relatively low top speed and making it unreliable. Also, few bridges could support its weight. However, rather like the Second World War Churchill tank, the Conqueror had exceptional terrain handling characteristics.

One feature of particular note was the rotating commander's cupola, which was at the heart of the Conqueror's fire control system and was advanced for its time. The commander could align the cupola on a target independently of the turret, measure the range with the built in coincidence rangefinder, and then initiate the rotation of the turret until it matched the cupola. At that point the commander could make fine adjustment and fire the gun or pass control to the gunner leaving the commander free to search for the next target. The Soviet bloc also used similar devices, such as the TPKU-2 and TKN-3, on all of their post–World War II tanks, though theirs did not include a rangefinder.

It was the largest and heaviest tank used by the British Army at the time the first Conqueror was completed in 1955. In all, before production ceased in 1959, 20 Mark 1 and 165 Mark 2 Conquerors were built, including those converted from Caernarvons. Once the Centurion was upgraded to use the L7 105 mm gun the tactical relevance of the Conqueror, and dedicated heavy gun tanks in general, faded as the Main Battle Tank rose to prominence.

== Variants ==
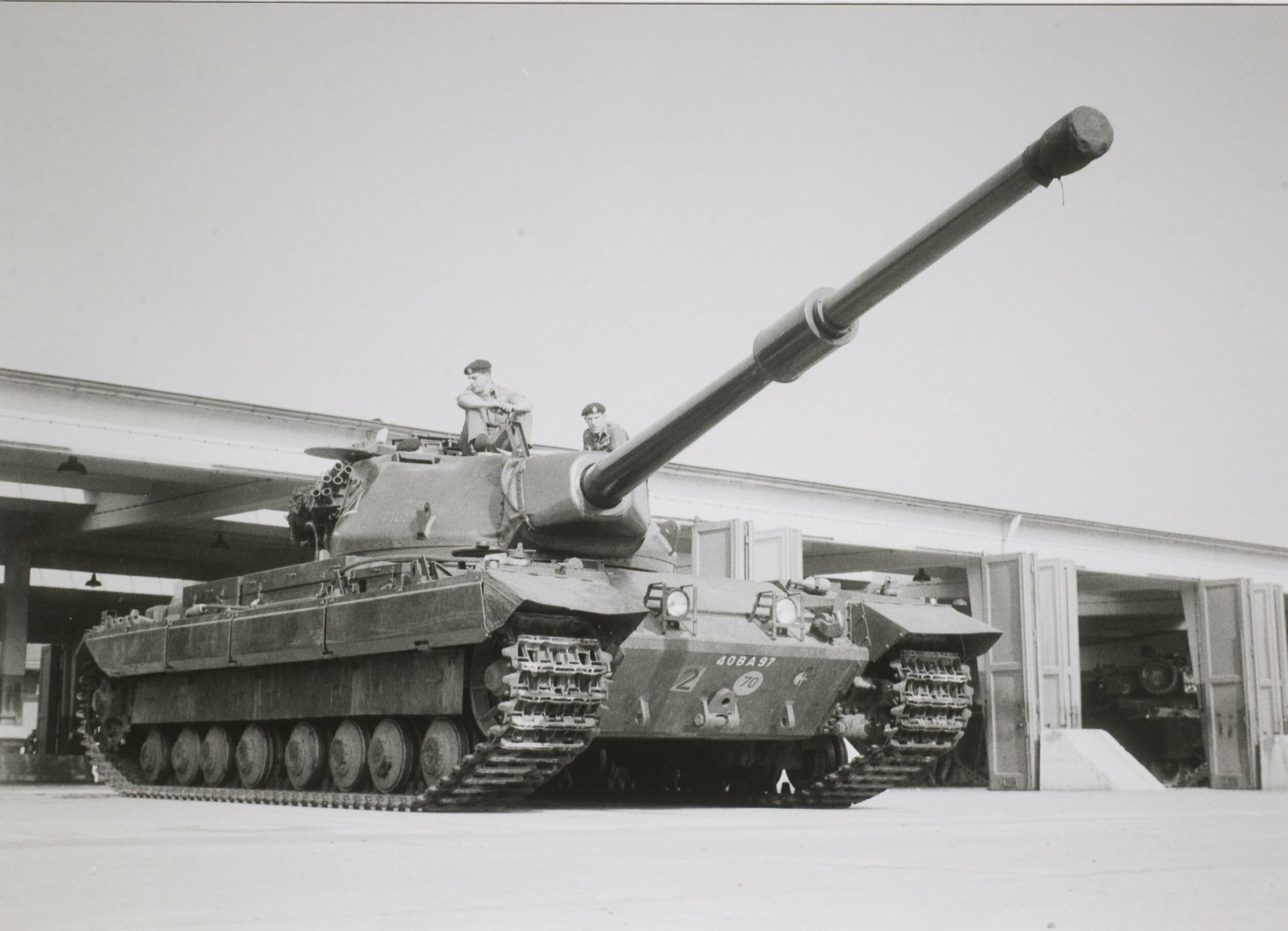
Conqueror Mk 2 of the British Army of the Rhine in 1962.

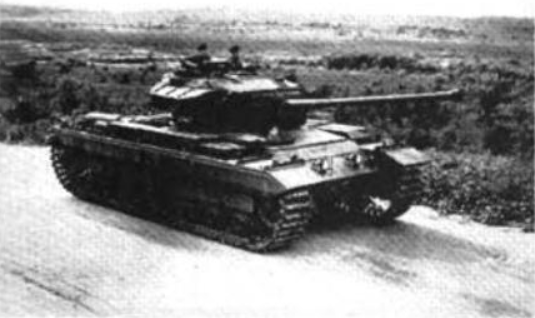
Caernarvon Mk 2

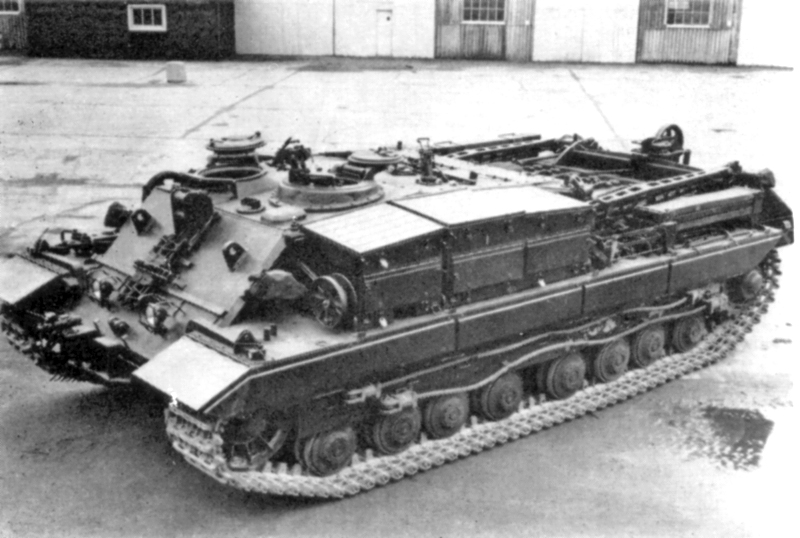
FV 222 Conqueror ARV Mk II

The variants of the Conqueror tank and developments directly related to its development are:

- FV 214 Conqueror
  - Mk I (had three periscopes for the driver).
  - Mk II (included better join of frontal armour plates, a single periscope for the driver, and an improved exhaust system).
  - Mk II/I/H – rebuilt Caernarvons.
- Tank, heavy No. 2, 183 mm gun, FV 215

Design study of Conqueror chassis with limited traverse turret mounting 183 mm gun. Wooden mockup produced.

- FV 221 Caernarvon
  - Mk I – prototype.
  - Mk II – experimental series, 21 built.
- FV 222 Conqueror armoured recovery vehicle (ARV)
  - Mk I – 8 produced.
  - Mk II – 20 produced. Weight: 57 tons. Winch capacity: 45 tons (direct pull).

== Operators ==
- United Kingdom: 1955–1966. Deployed with BAOR in West Germany only.

== Surviving vehicles ==
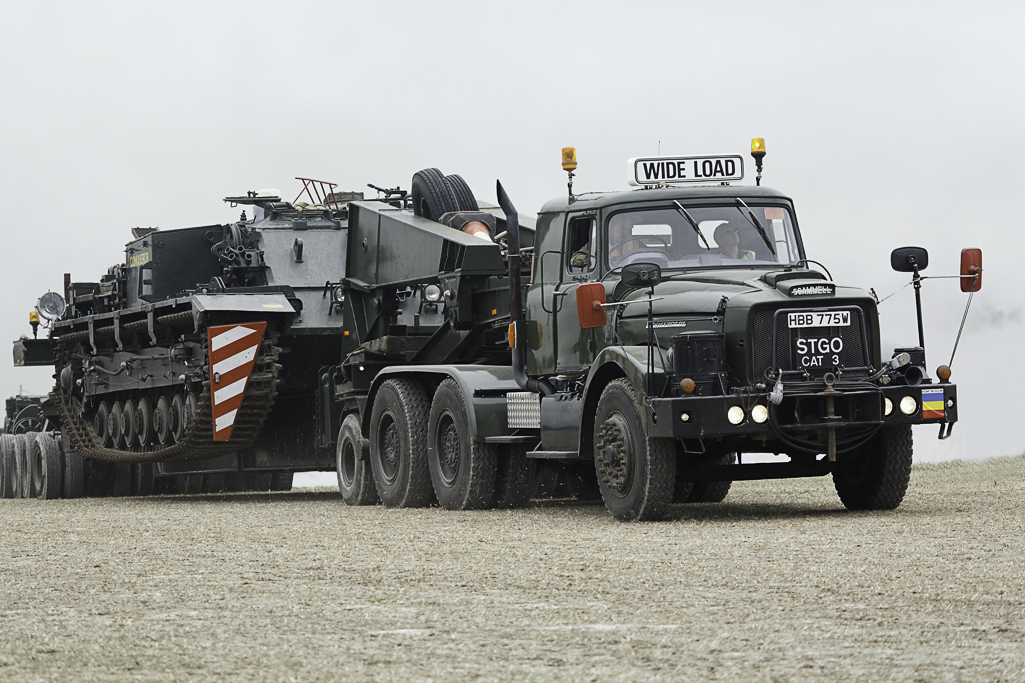
Scammell Contractor hauling the REME's Conqueror ARV2 FV222 Tank Recovery Vehicle (2008)

In the United Kingdom, Conqueror tanks are displayed at The Tank Museum, Bovington, (with another in use as a gate guardian across the road outside Stanley Barracks), at the Land Warfare Hall of the Imperial War Museum Duxford and at the Defence Capability Centre in Shrivenham. Other tanks are in the collections of the Musée des Blindés in France, the Gunfire Museum in Brasschaat, Belgium (a Mark 2), the Kubinka Tank Museum, Russia, and the Royal Tank Museum, Amman, Jordan. One is privately owned in the United States as part of the Littlefield Collection and another is in use as a gate guardian outside the Royal Tank Regiment Officers' Mess, which was restored by 2nd Royal Tank Regiment Light Aid Detachment (REME) in 2009, having previously been in a deteriorating state at Castlemartin Ranges (where it had previously been the guardian "Romulus" before being replaced by a German Leopard MBT).

There are also two MkII ARVs at the Military History Museum on the Isle of Wight in an unrestored condition. A MkII ARV is held by the REME Museum of Technology, although it is not on display. There was formerly a Conqueror gate guardian at Base Vehicle Depot Ludgershall – informally known as "William". It is now part of the Isle of Wight Military Museum.

A Conqueror ARV remained in service at the Amphibious Experimental Establishment AXE, at Instow in North Devon, UK. It was used for beach tank recovery practice. At least one Conqueror exists in poor condition on the grounds of Kirkcudbright Training Area in Scotland, where it was used as a gunnery target. A number of Conquerors remain on the Haltern Training area in Germany.

== Tanks of comparable role, performance and era ==
- M103 heavy tank – American heavy tank with similar main armament.
- AMX-50 – French heavy tank also armed with a 120 mm gun.
- IS-3 – Soviet heavy tank which the Conqueror was designed to counter.
- T-10 tank – Soviet heavy tank in service at the same time as the Conqueror.
