= T-10 tank =

Soviet heavy tank

T-10 Heavy Tank
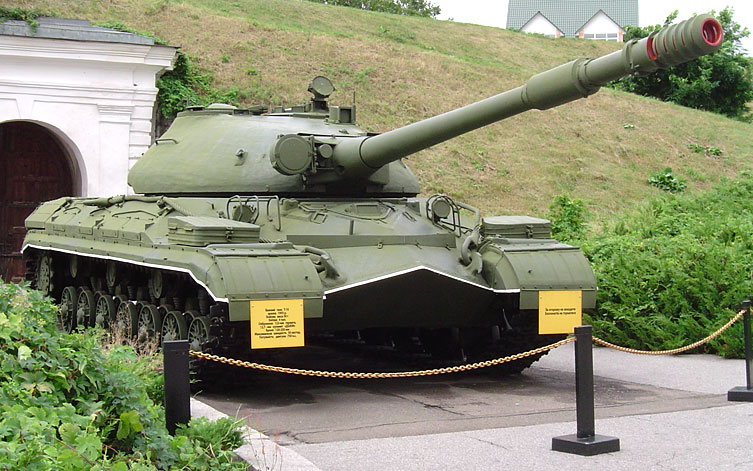
- T-10M at the National Museum of the History of Ukraine in the Second World War, Kyiv
- Type: Heavy tank
- Place of origin: Soviet Union

Service history
- In service: 1954–1996 (sources vary)
- Used by: Soviet Union; Russia; South Ossetia
- Wars: Cold War; Warsaw Pact invasion of Czechoslovakia

Production history
- Designer: Jozef Kotin
- Designed: 1949–53
- Manufacturer: Factory 185, Factory 174
- Produced: 1954–66
- No. built: 1,439

Specifications
- Mass: 52 tonnes
- Length: 7.41 m, 9.87 m over gun
- Width: 3.56 m
- Height: 2.43 m
- Crew: 4 (Commander/Radio Operator, Gunner, Loader, Driver)
- Armour: Turret: T-10, A/B: 203 mm@24° to 129 mm@57°; T-10M: 230 mm@24° to 137 mm@57°; Upper Glacis: 120 mm@55°&40° compound angle; 273 mm LoS; Lower Glacis: 120 mm@50°; 186 mm LoS; Upper Side: 80 mm@62° + 30 mm@30°; 205 mm LoS; Lower Side: 80 mm@10°; Rear: 60 mm Mantlet: 252 mm
- Main armament: 122 mm D-25TA gun T-10M: 122 mm M-62-T2 gun
- Secondary armament: 2 × 12.7 DShKM machine gun T-10M: 2 x 14.5 KPVT heavy machine gun
- Engine: 39-l 12-cyl. diesel model V-2-5; 700 hp (522 kW); T-10M: 750 hp (559 kW)
- Power/weight: 13 hp/tonne
- Suspension: Torsion-bar
- Operational range: 250 km/150 miles
- Maximum speed: 42 km/h (26 mph); T-10M: 50 km/h (31 mph)

The T-10 (also known as Object 730 or IS-8) was a Soviet heavy tank of the Cold War, the final development of the IS tank series. During development, it was called Object 730. It was accepted into production in 1953 as the IS-8 (Iosif Stalin, Russian form of Joseph Stalin), but due to the political climate in the wake of Stalin's death in 1953, it was renamed T-10.

The biggest differences from its direct ancestor, the IS-3, were a longer hull, seven pairs of road wheels instead of six, a larger turret mounting a new gun with fume extractor, an improved diesel engine, and increased armour. General performance was similar, although the T-10 could carry more ammunition, from 28 rounds to 30 rounds.

T-10s (like the IS tanks they replaced) were deployed in independent tank regiments belonging to armies, and independent tank battalions belonging to divisions. These independent tank units could be attached to mechanized units, to support infantry operations and perform breakthroughs.

== Background ==
In 1948 the Soviets had three different kinds of heavy tanks in service sharing little except for road wheels and guns: The IS-2 was the most mechanically reliable, but was becoming obsolete with Western countries such as United States and the United Kingdom fielding newer heavy tanks. The IS-3 was plagued with construction and mechanical problems, and the IS-4 was too heavy to cross bridges in Europe and relegated to the Russian Far East region as a result. Kotin personally led a design team to work on project Object 730 to meet the GBTU (Main Armored Vehicle Directorate) requirements for a new heavy tank: it had to be better than the IS-2 and weigh no more than 50 metric tons.

== Design ==
The T-10 features a cast hull divided into three compartments, with the driver at the front, the fighting in the center and the engine at the rear. The hull floor features a stamped steel plate in a shallow V shape. The driver sits on the center of the hull and is provided with a hatch cover while the hatch itself features an integral periscope that can be replaced with an infrared one for night driving. The turret is made of rolled steel with the commander and gunner on the left and the loader on the right. Both the commander and loader are provided with hatch covers. A ventilation dome is mounted forward of the two hatch covers.

The T-10 uses the same engine of the IS-4, and reportedly was difficult to replace in the field. According to Sewell the engine was more stressed in comparison to the IS-3. Stowage boxes are mounted on the sides of the hull above the tracks and additional fuel tanks can be fitted at the rear to increase the tank operational range.

The torsion bar suspension consists of seven road wheels with six shock absorbers fitted to each side. A 12.7 mm DShK machine gun is mounted coaxially and an additional DShK was mounted on the loader's hatch ring for anti-aircraft defence.

In 1955, the T-54 tank (designed by the Morozov Design Bureau) and the T-10 were fitted with stabilizers to allow them to fire on the move. While earlier Soviet stabilizers made it unnecessary for the gunner to wait until the gun stopped wobbling before engaging his targets, they did not provide the ability of accurately hitting targets on the move. The T-54 would eventually receive the STP-2 "Tsiklon" (Cyclone) stabilizer while the T-10 was fitted with the PUOT-2 "Grom" (Thunder) stabilizer. While a T-54 gunner only needed to point and fire the gun once he had a stable picture of the target on his sights, the T-10 gunner had to wait for the gun and sight to be stabilized together, slowing down the firing rate.

While the T-10 had thicker armor than the T-54, it suffered from a low rate of fire of three rounds per minute due the use of separate loading ammunition, limited gun depression (a common feature of Soviet tanks), a limit of 30 rounds of ammunition for the main gun, lack of internal space for the crew, and lack of cross-country mobility. The T-10 had an operational range of 180–280 kilometres (110–170 mi) on roads, which was considerably shorter than the T-54, which had a range of over 400 km (250 mi) and the T-55, which could drive 500–700 km (310–430 mi) with 400 litres (88 imp gal; 110 US gal) of auxiliary fuel.

== Demise of Soviet heavy tanks ==
The mobile nature of armoured warfare in World War II had demonstrated the drawbacks of the slow heavy tanks. In the final push towards Berlin, mechanized divisions had become widely split up as heavy tanks lagged behind the more mobile T-34s. The Soviets continued to produce heavy tanks for a few years as part of the Cold War arms race (compare the heavier U.S. M103 and British Conqueror), but the more flexible T-62 and T-64 tanks already had armour and armament comparable to the T-10s.

In the 1960s, the Soviets embraced the main battle tank (MBT) concept, by replacing heavy tanks with mobile medium tanks. In the late 1960s, the independent tank battalions with heavy tanks were re-equipped with the higher-technology T-64s, and later, the very fast T-80, while regular tank and mechanized units fielded the more basic T-55s and T-72s. T-10 production was stopped in 1966, and heavy tank projects were cancelled, such as the auto-loaded, 130 mm-armed Object 770.

Antitank guided missiles (ATGMs) started to be deployed widely during this period, and would become an effective replacement for the heavy tanks' long-range firepower. The Soviets made use of them first on BMP-1 infantry fighting vehicles, and later on the T-64 and other MBTs. Eventually, lighter and more modern reactive or composite armour was used to give the MBTs a further edge in protection without slowing them down.

=== Name changes ===
The T-10 underwent a number of designation changes during its design process starting in 1944 and ending its acceptance into service as the T-10.

Date	Designation	Notes
2 Apr 1946	Object 705A	ChKZ ordered to work on the Object 705A, a variant of the Object 705
11 Apr 1949	IS-5 or Object 730	Redesignated the IS-5 or Object 730
29 Feb 1953	IS-8 or Object 730	Redesignated due to a massive number of improvements to the prototype
	IS-9	
	IS-10	
28 Nov 1953	T-10	Accepted for service, redesignated the T-10 as part of a destalinization process.

== Production history ==
The T-10 served with the Soviet Union but was not known to have been provided to Warsaw Pact nations, though Soviet heavy tank regiments stationed in those countries may have been equipped with them. Prior to 1962, T-10Ms were in simultaneous production by two factories (Kirov as Object 272 and Chelyabinsk as Object 734) whose parts were incompatible with those of the other; Kirov's version was standardized in 1962.

Some Western sources claim that the T-10M was exported to countries such as China, Egypt, and Syria, with Syria and Egypt using it in the Yom Kippur War to provide long-range support to the T-55 and T-62, with said sources claiming that the T-10s knocked out several M48 Pattons with none lost, indicating that the T-10 was used to some degree of combat success. However, the T-10 could have been mistaken for its similar counterpart, the IS-3. Heavy tanks were withdrawn from Soviet front-line service by 1967, and entirely removed from reserve service by 1996.

It is estimated that some 6,000 Soviet heavy tanks were built after the end of World War II, of which 1,439 were T-10s.

=== Variants ===
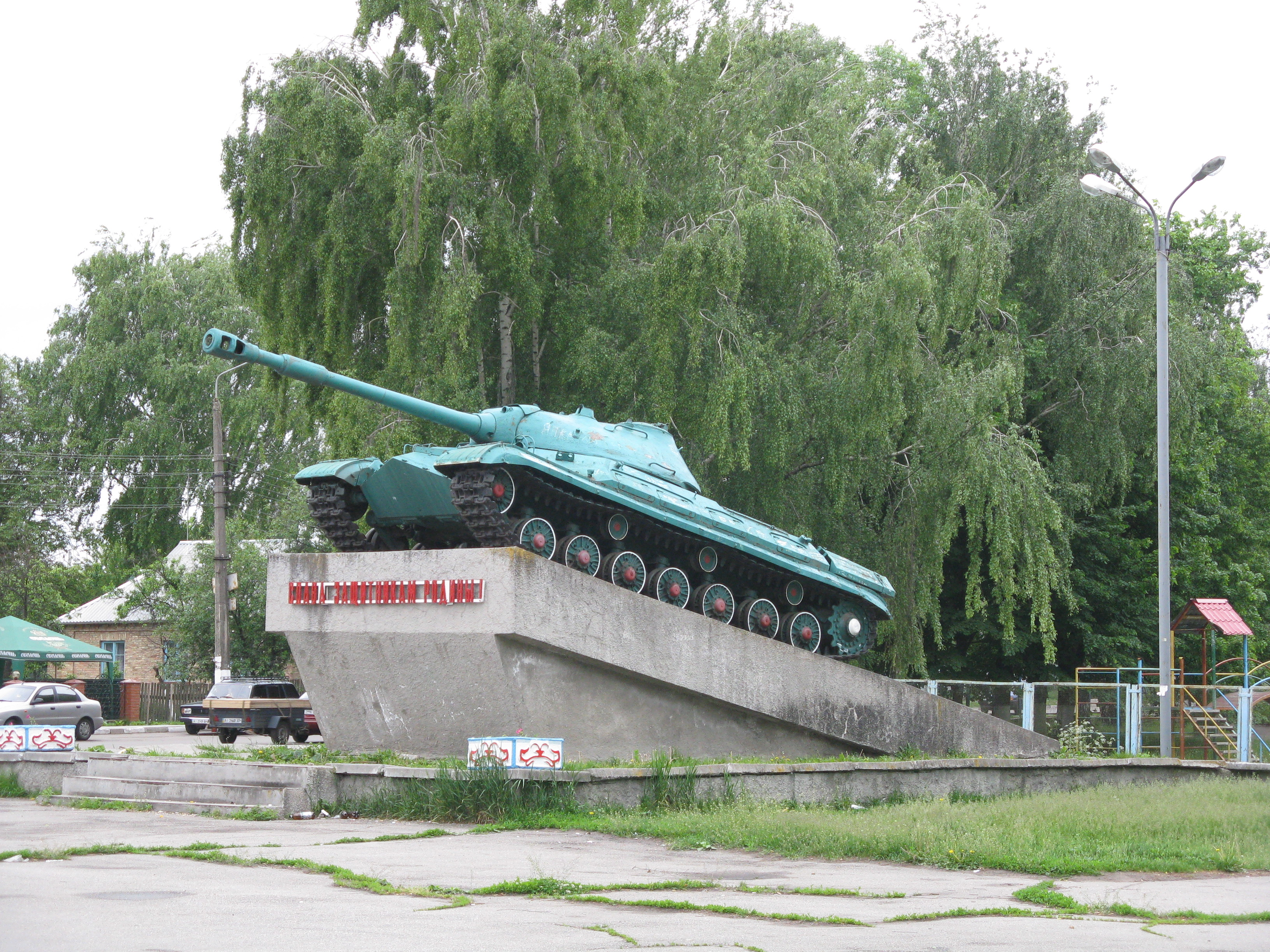
T-10A in Kaharlyk, Ukraine

- T-10 (1952)
- T-10A (1956): T-10 with an added single-plane gun stabilizer.
- T-10B (1957): T-10 with an added 2-plane gun stabilizer.
- T-10M (1957): Modernized version with longer M-62-T2 L/46 gun with five-baffle muzzle brake, 2-plane gun stabilizer, machine guns replaced with 14.5 mm KPVT (a better ballistic match for the new main gun), infrared night vision equipment, NBC protection. Overall length is 10.29 m.
  - 1963 - T-10M is equipped with OPVT deep-wading snorkel.
  - 1967 - T-10M is supplied with APDS and HEAT ammunition.
- Object 266 (1950): Variant of the early IS-8 with a hydromechanical transmission. 1 built.
- Object 268 (1956): Proposed self-propelled gun on a T-10M hull. One prototype was produced, but never entered production.
- Object 282: A missile-tank armed with 'Salamandra' ATGM system, which was deemed unsuccessful.
- Object 282T: Armed with either 152 mm or 132 mm unguided anti-tank rockets, shortened chassis with six road wheels per side.
- Object 821: A launch platform for the RT-20P ICBM.
- TES-3: A mobile nuclear power plant composed of four distinct units, all on an elongated T-10 chassis, that would be interconnected when in operation. The single prototype was operated for more than twelve thousand hours during the experimental period between October 13, 1961 and June 18, 1965.
- 2B1 Oka: A 420 mm (17 in) self-propelled heavy mortar.

== Operators ==
Former operators

- Russia - Retired in 1996.
- Soviet Union

Former potential operators

- East Germany - 121 T-10Ms planned to be ordered in 1957 and adopted by 1959. The order was cancelled as heavy tanks were becoming obsolete.

== See also ==
- AMX-50 – (France)
- M103 heavy tank – (United States)
- Conqueror tank – (United Kingdom)

== Sources ==
- Foss, Christopher F, ed. (1979). Jane's Armour and Artillery 1979–80 (1st ed.). London: Jane's Publishing Company. ISBN 0-354-00588-X.
- Miller, David, The Illustrated Directory of Tanks of the World (Zenith Imprint Press, 2000) ISBN 0-7603-0892-6
- Perret, Bryan, Soviet Armour Since 1945, London:Blandford Press (1987), ISBN 0-7137-1735-1
- (English) M. V. Pavlov; I. V. Pavlov, "Domestic Armored Vehicles of the 1945-1965 biennium", Table 4 "Production of tanks in the 1945-1965 biennium", Equipment and Armament, n.6 2008 (June 2008)
  - (Original Russian) М. В. Павлов; И.В. Павлов, "Отечественные бронированные машины в 1945–1965 гг", Таблица 4 "Производство танков в 1945–1965 гг", Техника и вооружение, n.6 2008 (June 2008)
- Sewell, Stephen ‘Cookie’, Why Three Tanks?, Armor, vol. 108, n 4 (July–August 1998), Fort Knox, KY: US Army Armor Center
- Sewell, Stephen L. "Cookie" (July–August 2002). "Red Star − White Elephant?". Armor. 111 (4). Fort Knox, KY: U.S. Armor Association: 26−32. ISSN 0004-2420.
- Kinnear, James; Sewell, Stephen 'Cookie' Soviet T-10 Heavy Tank and Variants (Osprey Publishing, 2017) ISBN 978-1-4728-2051-8
- Tucker, Spencer, Tanks: An Illustrated History of Their Impact, ABC-CLIO (2004), ISBN 1-57607-995-3, ISBN 978-1-57607-995-9
- Magnuski, Janusz. “Czołg Ciężki T-10” in Nowa Technika Wojskowa (August 1955).
- Haskew, Michael. "Modern Tanks and Artillery (1945–Present): The World's Greatest Weapons (Amber Books, September 19, 2014) ISBN 978-1-78274-205-0
