= M26 Pershing =

American medium/heavy battle tank (1944–1951)

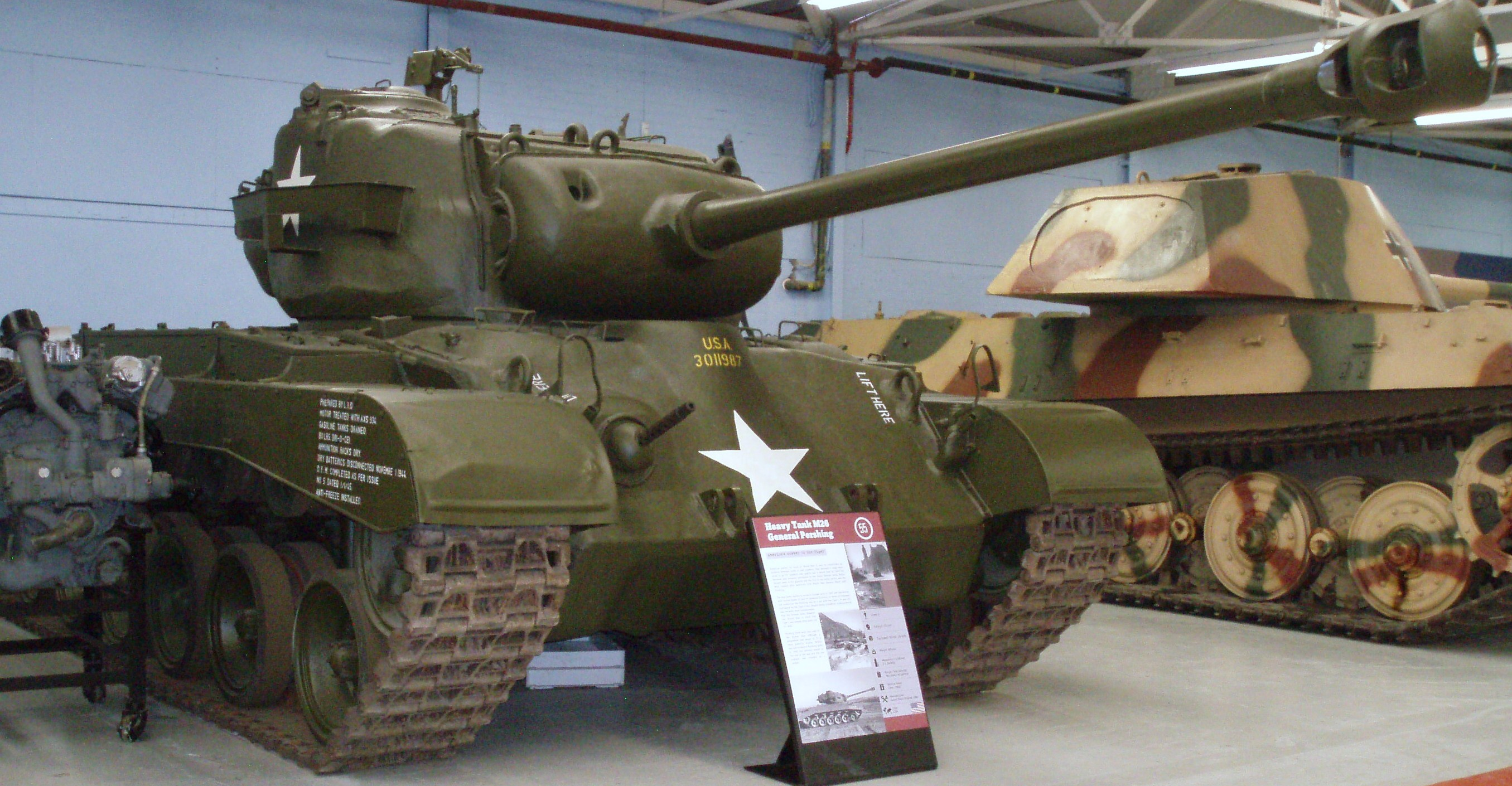
- An M26 Pershing tank at The Tank Museum
- Type: Heavy tank, then medium tank
- Place of origin: United States

Service history
- In service: late 1944–1951 (United States)
- Used by: See Operators below
- Wars: World War II; Korean War

Production history
- Designer: United States
- Designed: 1942–1944
- Manufacturer: Detroit Arsenal Tank Plant; Fisher Tank Arsenal
- Developed into: Super Pershing, M46 Patton
- Unit cost: US$83,273.89 (1945), equivalent to $1,489,233 in 2025
- Produced: November 1944 – October 1945
- No. built: 2,202

Specifications
- Mass: 92,355 lb (41.9 t) fighting weight
- Length: 20 ft 9.5 in (6.337 m) turret facing aft; 28 ft 4.5 in (8.649 m) turret forward
- Width: 11 ft 6 in (3.51 m)
- Height: 9 ft 1.5 in (2.781 m)
- Crew: 5 (commander, gunner, loader, driver, co-driver)
- Armor: Upper hull: 102 mm (4.0 in); Lower hull, turret sides: 76 mm (3.0 in); Hull sides: 50–75 mm (2.0–3.0 in)
- Main armament: 90 mm Gun M3; 70 rounds
- Secondary armament: 2× .30-06 M1919 Browning (5,000 rounds); 1× .50 cal. M2 Browning (550 rounds)
- Engine: Ford GAF; 8-cylinder, gasoline 450–500 hp (340–370 kW)
- Power/weight: 11.9 hp (8.9 kW)/tonne
- Suspension: Torsion bar
- Operational range: 100 mi (160 km)
- Maximum speed: 30 mph (48 km/h) road; 5.25 mph (8.45 km/h) off-road

The M26 Pershing is a heavy tank, later designated as a medium tank (Tank, Medium, M26), (Note: The Pershing was briefly classified as a heavy tank between mid-1945 and mid-1947, but was classified as a medium tank from the beginning of the development of the T20-series in Spring 1942 to its entry in service in mid-1945 and from mid-1947 to later.) formerly used by the United States Army during the early years of the Cold War. It was used in the last months of World War II during the Invasion of Germany and extensively during the Korean War. The tank was named after General of the Armies John J. Pershing, who led the American Expeditionary Force in Europe during World War I.

The M26 was intended as a replacement for the M4 Sherman, but a prolonged development period meant that only a small number saw combat in Europe. Based on the criteria of firepower, mobility, and protection, US historian R. P. Hunnicutt ranked the Pershing behind the German Tiger II heavy tank, but ahead of the Tiger I heavy and Panther medium tanks. It was withdrawn in 1951 in favor of its improved derivative, the M46 Patton, which had a more powerful engine and more reliable transmission and an advanced suspension. The lineage of the M26 continued with the M47 Patton, and was reflected in the new designs of the later M48 Patton and M60 tank.

== Production history ==
=== Development ===
The M26 was the culmination of a series of medium tank prototypes that began with the T20 in 1942, and it was a significant design departure from the previous line of U.S. Army tanks that had ended with the M4 Sherman. Several design features were tested in the prototypes. Some of these were experimental dead-ends, but many became permanent characteristics of subsequent U.S. Army tanks. This series of prototype vehicles began as a medium tank project that was similar to, but more modern than the recently introduced M4 Sherman, and ended several years later as the U.S. Army's first operational heavy tank.

==== Improving on the M4 ====
The U.S. Army's first lineage of tanks evolved from the M1 Combat Car and progressed to the M2 Light Tank, M2 Medium Tank, M3 Lee, and finally the M4 Sherman. These tanks all had rear-mounted Continental air-cooled radial aircraft engines and a front sprocket drive. This layout required a driveshaft to pass under the turret, which increased the overall height of the tank, a characteristic shared with German tanks of World War II that also used this layout. The large diameter of the radial engines in M4 tanks added to the hull height. These features accounted for the high silhouette and large side sponsons that were characteristic of the M4 lineage.

In the spring of 1942, as the M4 Sherman was entering production, U.S. Army Ordnance began work on a follow-up tank. The T20 tank reached a mock-up stage in May 1942, and was intended as an improved medium tank to follow the M4. An earlier heavy tank, the M6, had been standardized in February 1942, but proved to be a failure. The U.S. Army had no doctrinal use for a heavy tank at the time.

==== T20 ====
The T20 was designed to have a more compact hull than the M4. The Ford GAN V-8, a lower silhouette version of the GAA engine used in later variants of the M4, had become available. The engine had originally been an effort by Ford to produce a V-12 liquid-cooled aircraft engine patterned after the Rolls-Royce Merlin, but failed to earn any aircraft orders and so was adapted as a V-8 for use in tanks; use of this lower profile engine together with the choice of a rear transmission and rear sprocket drive layout made it possible to lower the hull silhouette and eliminate the side sponsons.

The T20 was fitted with the new 76 mm M1A1 gun, the 3-inch M7 was considered too heavy at about 1,990 lb (900 kg). New stronger steels were used to create a weapon weighing about 1,200 lb (540 kg). The 3 inch front hull armor was .5 in (13 mm) thicker than the 63 mm (2.5 in) front armor of the M4. The glacis plate slope was similar at 46°. The T20's overall weight was approximately the same as the M4.

The T20 used an early version of the horizontal volute spring suspension (HVSS), another improvement compared to the less robust vertical volute spring suspension (VVSS) of the early versions of the M4. Later prototypes of the M26 tested a torsion bar suspension, which became the standard for future U.S. tank suspension systems.

==== T22 and T23 ====
The T22 series reverted to the M4 transmission because of problems with the early Torqmatic transmission used in the T20. The T22E1 tested an autoloader for the main gun and eliminated the loader's position with a small two-man turret.

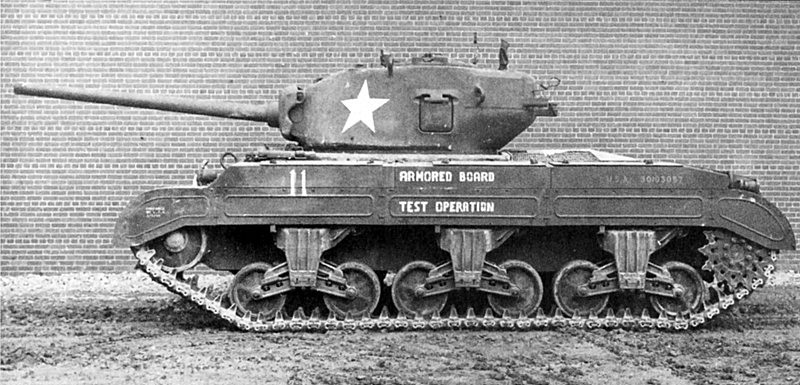
T23 with production cast turret mounting 76 mm M1A1 gun. The T23 turret was used for the 76-mm M4 Sherman. Note the vertical volute spring suspension.

Through much of 1943, there was little perceived need within the U.S. Army for a better tank than the 75 mm M4 Sherman, and so, lacking any insights from the rest of the Army as to what was needed, the Ordnance Department then took a developmental detour into electrical transmissions with the T23 series.

The electrical transmission was built by General Electric and had the engine driving a generator that powered two traction motors. The concept was similar to the drive system of the German "Porsche Tiger". It had performance advantages in rough or hilly terrain, where the system could better handle the rapid changes in torque requirements.

The electrical transmission T23 was championed by the Ordnance Department during this phase of development. After the initial prototypes were built in early 1943, an additional 250 T23 tanks were produced from January to December 1944. These were the first tanks in the U.S. Army with the 76 mm M1A1 gun to go into production. However, the T23 would have required that the army adopt an entirely separate line of training, repair, and maintenance, and so was rejected for combat operations.

The primary legacy of the T23 would thus be its production cast turret, which was designed from the outset to be interchangeable with the turret ring of the M4 Sherman. The T23 turret was used on all production versions of the 76 mm M4 Sherman as the original M4 75 mm turret was found to be too small to easily mount the 76 mm M1A1 gun. The first production 76 mm M4 with the T23 turret, the M4E6, was built in the summer of 1943.

==== T25 and T26 ====
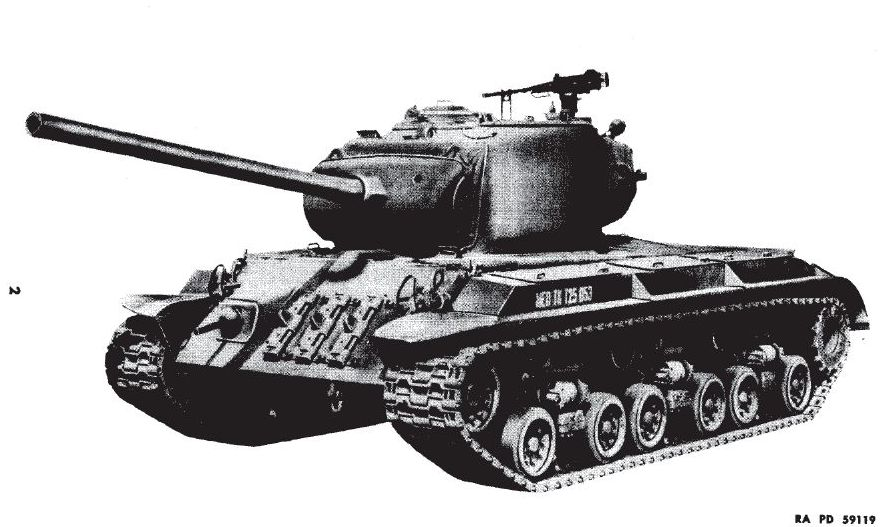
T25 variant

The T25 and T26 lines of tanks came into being in the midst of a heated internal debate within the U.S. Army from mid-1943 to early 1944 over the need for tanks with greater firepower and armor. A 90 mm gun mounted in a massive new turret was installed in both series. The T26 series were given additional frontal hull armor, with the glacis plate increased to 4 in (100 mm). This increased the weight of the T26 series to over 40 short tons (36 t) and decreased their mobility and durability as the engine and powertrain were not improved to compensate for the weight gain.

The T26E3 was the production version of the T26E1 with a number of minor modifications made as the result of field testing. In February 1945, the T26 was fielded in the European Theater, where its performance received early praise from Army Ordnance officials. The Army named the tank after Army General John J. Pershing when it was redesignated the M26 in March.

==== After the war ====
After World War II, some 800 M26 tanks were upgraded with improved engines, transmissions, and the improved 90mm gun M3A1. These were designated as the M26E2 and later redesignated as M46 Patton.

=== Delayed production ===
The M26 was introduced late into World War II and saw only a limited amount of combat. Tank historians, such as R. P. Hunnicutt, George Forty and Steven Zaloga, have generally agreed that the main cause of the delay in production of the M26 was opposition to the tank from the Army Ground Forces, headed by General Lesley McNair. Zaloga in particular has identified several specific factors that led both to the delay of the M26 program and limited improvements in the firepower of the M4:

1. Tank destroyer doctrine
McNair, who was an artillery officer, had promulgated the "tank destroyer doctrine" in the U.S. Army. In this doctrine, tanks were primarily for infantry support and exploitation of breakthroughs. Those tactics dictated that enemy tanks were to be engaged by tank destroyer forces, which were composed of lightly armored but relatively fast vehicles carrying more powerful anti-tank guns, as well as towed versions of these anti-tank guns. Under the tank destroyer doctrine, emphasis was placed only on improving the firepower of the tank destroyers, as there was a strong bias against developing a heavy tank to take on enemy tanks. This also limited improvements in the firepower of the M4 Sherman. The US Army Ground Forces that supported this doctrine got the approval of new TD projects, one of them using the same 90 mm gun, while at the same time they were blocking tank projects.
2. Simplification of supply
McNair established "battle need" criteria for acquisition of weapons in order to make best use of America's 3,000-mile-long (4,800 km) supply line to Europe by preventing the introduction of weapons that would prove unnecessary, extravagant or unreliable on the battlefield. In his view, the introduction of a new heavy tank had problems in terms of transportation, supply, service, and reliability, and was not necessary in 1943 or early 1944. Tank development took time, and so the sudden appearance of a new tank threat could not be met quickly enough under such criteria.
3. Complacency
A sense of complacency fell upon those in charge of developing tanks in the U.S. Army because the M4 Sherman, in 1942, was considered by the Americans to be superior to the most common German tanks: the Panzer III and early models of the Panzer IV. Even through most of 1943, the 75 mm M4 Sherman was adequate against the majority of German armor, although the widespread appearance of the German 7.5 cm KwK 40 tank gun during this time had led to a growing awareness that the M4 was becoming outgunned. There was insufficient intelligence data processing and forward thinking to understand that an arms race in tanks was in progress and that the U.S. needed to anticipate future German tank threats. The Tiger I and Panther tanks that appeared in 1943 were seen in only very limited numbers by U.S. forces and hence were not considered as major threats. The end result was that, in 1943, the Ordnance Department lacking any guidance from the rest of the army, concentrated its efforts in tank development mainly on its major project, the electrical transmission T23. In contrast, the Russians and British were engaged in a continuous effort to improve tanks; in 1943, the British began development of what became the 51-ton Centurion tank (although this tank reached service just too late to see combat in World War II) and, on the Eastern Front, the tank arms race was emphatically underway, with the Soviets responding to the German heavy tanks by starting development work on the T-34-85 and IS-2 tanks.

From mid-1943 to mid-1944, development of the 90 mm up-armored T26 prototype continued to proceed slowly due to disagreements within the U.S. Army about its future tank needs. The accounts of what exactly happened during this time vary by historian, but all agree that Army Ground Forces was the main source of resistance that delayed production of the T26.

In September–October 1943, a series of discussions occurred over the issue of beginning production of the T26E1, which was advocated by the head of the Armored Force, General Jacob Devers. Ordnance favored the 76 mm gun, electrical transmission T23. Theater commanders generally favored a 76 mm gun medium tank such as the T23 and were against a heavy 90 mm gun tank. However, testing of the T23 at Fort Knox had demonstrated reliability problems in the electrical transmission of which most army commanders were unaware. The new 76 mm M1A1 gun approved for the M4 Sherman seemed to address concerns about firepower against the German tanks. Although it could reliably penetrate the frontal armor of a Tiger 1 at standard ranges, all participants in the debate were, however, unaware of the inadequacy of the 76 mm gun against the frontal armor of the Panther tank, specifically its upper glacis (although its turret could still be penetrated at standard ranges), as they had not researched the effectiveness of this gun against the new German tanks, which had already been encountered in combat.

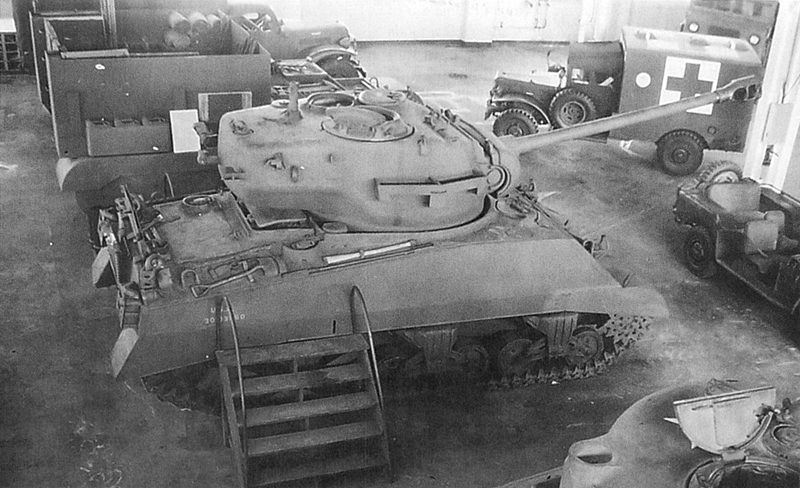
Single prototype of 90 mm gun T26 turret mounted on an M4(105) chassis.

Gen. Lesley J. McNair had agreed to the production of the 76 mm M4 Sherman, and he strongly opposed the additional production of the T26E1. In the fall of 1943, he wrote this letter to Devers, responding to the latter's advocacy of the T26E1:

The M4 tank, particularly the M4A3, has been widely hailed as the best tank on the battlefield today. There are indications that the enemy concurs in this view. Apparently, the M4 is an ideal combination of mobility, dependability, speed, protection, and firepower. Other than this particular request—which represents the British view—there has been no call from any theater for a 90 mm tank gun. There appears to be no fear on the part of our forces of the German Mark VI (Tiger) tank... There can be no basis for the T26 tank other than the conception of a tank versus tank duel—which is believed unsound and unnecessary. Both British and American battle experience has demonstrated that the antitank gun in suitable number and disposed properly is the master of the tank. Any attempt to armor and gun tanks so as to outmatch antitank guns is foredoomed to failure... There is no indication that the 76 mm antitank gun is inadequate against the German Mark VI (Tiger) tank.

General Devers pressed on with his advocacy for the T26, going over McNair's head to General George Marshall, and, on 16 December 1943, Marshall overruled McNair and authorized the production of 250 T26E1 tanks. Then, in late December 1943, Devers was transferred to the Mediterranean, where he eventually led the invasion of Southern France with the 6th Army Group. In his absence, further attempts were made to derail the T26 program, but continued support from Generals Marshall and Eisenhower kept the production order alive. Testing and production of the T26E1 proceeded slowly, however, and the T26E1 did not begin full production until November 1944. These production models were designated as the T26E3.

A single prototype of a T26 turret mounted on an M4(105) chassis was built by Chrysler in the summer of 1944, but did not progress into production.

Hunnicutt, researching Ordnance Department documents, asserts that Ordnance requested production of 500 each of the T23, T25E1, and T26E1 in October 1943. The AGF objected to the 90 mm gun of the tanks, whereas the Armored Force wanted the 90 mm gun mounted in a Sherman tank chassis. General Devers cabled from London a request for production of the T26E1. In January 1944, 250 T26E1s were authorized. General Barnes of Ordnance continued to press for production of 1,000 tanks.

According to Forty, Ordnance recommended that 1,500 of the T26E1 be built. The Armored Force recommended only 500. The AGF rejected the 90 mm version of the tank and wanted it to be built with the 76 mm gun instead. Somehow, Ordnance managed to get production of the T26E1 started in November 1944. Forty primarily quoted from a post-war report from the Ordnance Dept.

=== Production ===
Production finally began in November 1944. Ten T26E3 tanks were produced that month at the Fisher Tank Arsenal, 30 in December, 70 in January 1945, and 132 in February. The Detroit Tank Arsenal also started production in March 1945, and the combined output was 194 tanks for that month. Production continued through the end of the war, and over 2,000 were produced by the end of 1945.

=== Super Pershing (T26E4, M26E1) ===
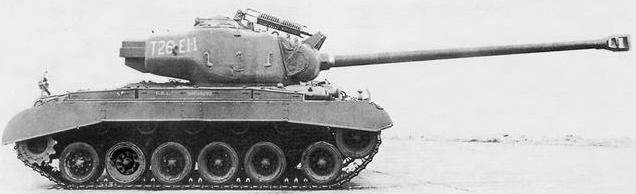
The up-gunned T26E4. Note the 73 caliber gun, designed to compete with the 88 mm KwK 43 L/71 gun mounted on the King Tiger.

The 90 mm M3 gun of the Pershing was similar to the German 88 mm KwK 36 L/56 gun mounted on the Tiger I. In an effort to match the firepower of the King Tiger's more powerful 88 mm KwK 43, the T15E1 90 mm gun was developed and first mounted in a T26E1 in January 1945. This tank was re-designated T26E4 (note that while the markings said T26E1-1, the tank was officially a T26E4 because it was mounted with a T15E1 gun.) The T15E1 gun was 73 calibers in length and had a much longer high-capacity chamber giving it a muzzle velocity of 3,750 ft/s (1,140 m/s) with the T30E16 HVAP shot. This allowed it to penetrate up to 260mm of armor and could penetrate the Tiger's frontal armor beyond 1,100 yd (1,000 m). The model shown used single-piece 50-inch-long (1,300 mm) ammunition and was the only T26E4 sent to Europe. Firing trials with the T15E1 revealed that the length and weight of the single-piece ammunition made it difficult to stow inside the tank and load into the gun breech.

A second pilot tank was converted from a T26E3 and used a modified T15E2 gun, which used two-piece ammunition. Twenty-five production models of the tank mounting the T15E2 gun were built. An improved mounting removed the need for stabilizer springs.

Post-war, two M26 tanks had the T54 gun installed, which had the same long gun barrel, but the ammunition cartridge was designed to be shorter and fatter, while still retaining the propellant force of the original round. The tanks were designated as the M26E1 tank, but lack of funds cut off further production.

=== Post-World War II development ===
In May 1946, due to changing conceptions of the U.S. Army's tank needs, the M26 was reclassified as a medium tank. Designed as a heavy tank, (Note: The Army called the tank a heavy tank mostly for morale purposes according to armor historian R. P. Hunnicutt) the Pershing was a significant upgrade from the M4 Sherman in terms of firepower, protection, and mobility. On the other hand, it was unsatisfactory for a medium tank (because it used the same engine that powered the M4A3, which was some ten tons lighter) and its transmission was somewhat unreliable. In 1948, the M26E2 version was developed with a new powerplant. Eventually, the new version was redesignated the M46 Patton and 1,160 M26s were rebuilt to this new standard. Thus, the M26 became a base of the Patton tank series, which replaced it in early 1950s. The M47 Patton was an M46 Patton with a modified hull front and new turret. The later M48 Patton and M60, which the former saw service later in the Vietnam War and both saw combat in various conflicts in the Middle East and still serve in active duty in many nations today, were evolutionary redesigns of the original layout set down by the Pershing.

== Combat history ==
=== World War II in Europe ===
Development of the M26 during World War II was prolonged by a number of factors, the most important being opposition to the tank from Army Ground Forces. However, the tank losses experienced in the Battle of the Bulge against a concentrated German tank force composed of some 400 Panther tanks, as well as Tiger II tanks and other German armored fighting vehicles, revealed the deficiencies in the 75 mm-gunned M4 Shermans and tank destroyers in the American units. This deficiency motivated the military to ship the tanks to Europe, and on 22 December 1944, the T26E3 tanks were ordered to be deployed to Europe.

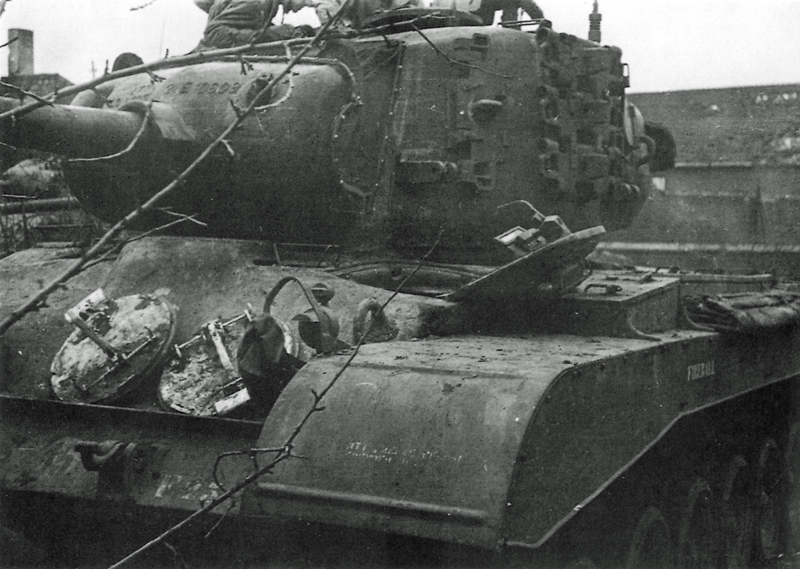
T26E3 nicknamed Fireball, knocked out by a Tiger I in an ambush. An 88 mm round penetrated the gun mantlet.

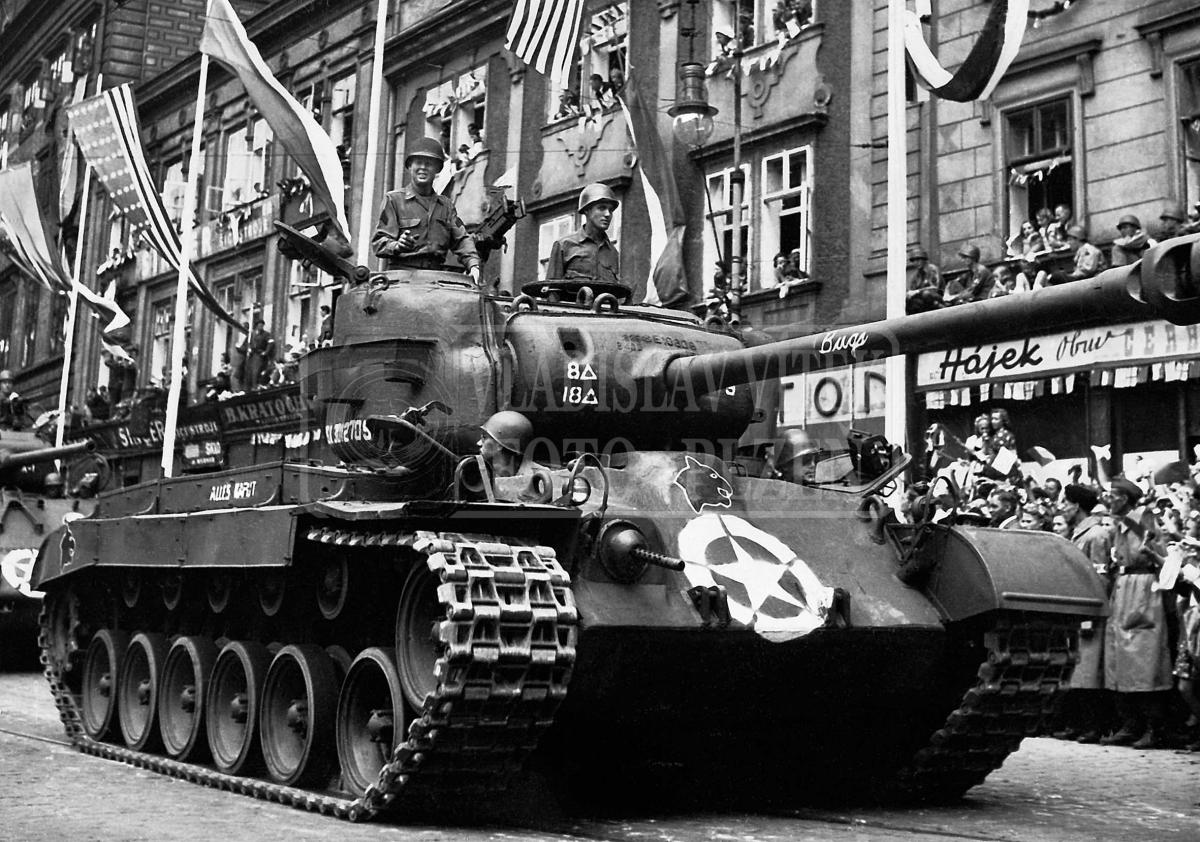
8th Armored Division M26 in the streets of Plzeň, Czechoslovakia

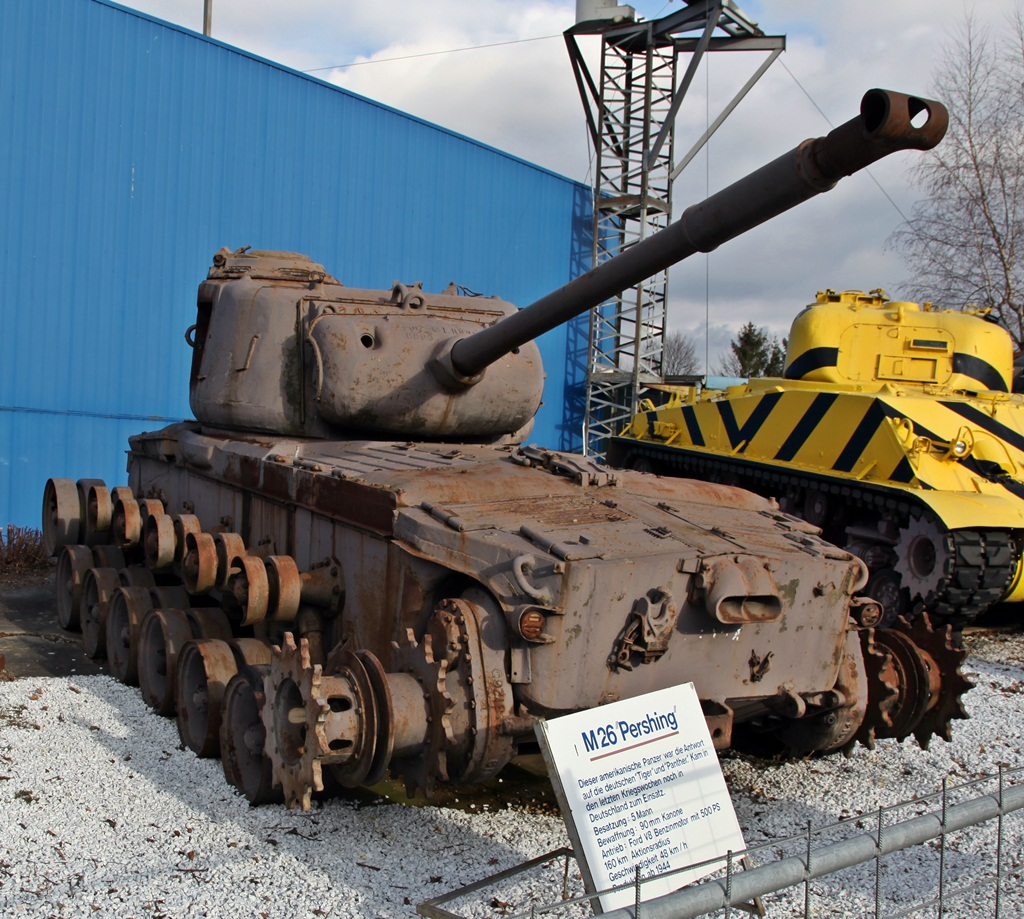
Salvaged M26 Pershing hull on display at the Sinsheim Auto & Technik Museum in Sinsheim, Germany

Due to the repeated design and production delays, only 20 Pershing tanks were introduced into the European theater of operations by early 1945. This first shipment of Pershings arrived in Antwerp in January 1945. They were given to the 1st Army, which split them between the 3rd and 9th Armored Divisions. A total of 310 T26E3 tanks were eventually sent to Europe before VE Day, with 200 being issued to the troops. The actual number that engaged in combat is unknown.

In February 1945, Major General Gladeon M. Barnes, chief of the Research and Development Section of Army Ordnance, personally led a special team to the European Theater, called the Zebra Mission. Its purpose was to support the T26E3 tanks, which still had teething problems, as well as to test other new weapons. In March, the T26E3 tanks were redesignated as the M26.

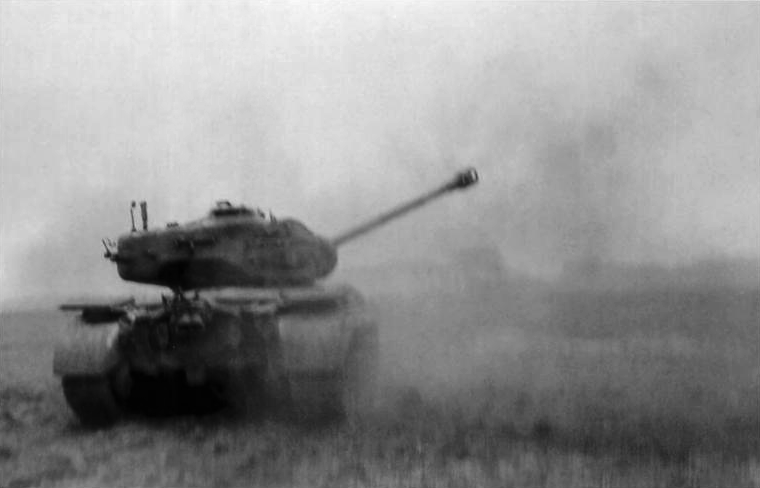
An M26 Pershing fires at German positions across the Rhine.

The 3rd Armored first used the M26 to engage the enemy on 25 February near the Roer River. On 26 February, a T26E3 named Fireball was knocked out in an ambush at Elsdorf while overwatching a roadblock. Silhouetted by a nearby fire, the Pershing was in a disadvantageous position. A concealed Tiger tank fired three shots from about 100 yd (91 m). The first penetrated the turret through the machine gun port in the mantlet, killing both the gunner and the loader. The second shot hit the gun barrel, causing the round that was in the chamber to fire with the effect of distorting the barrel. The last shot glanced off the turret side, taking off the upper cupola hatch. While backing up to escape, the Tiger became entangled in debris and was abandoned by the crew. Fireball was quickly repaired and returned to service on 7 March.

Shortly afterwards, also at Elsdorf, another T26E3 knocked out a Tiger I and two Panzer IVs. The Tiger was knocked out at 900 yd (820 m) with the 90-mm HVAP T30E16 ammunition. Photographs of this knocked out Tiger I in Hunnicutt's book showed a penetration through the lower gun shield.

On 6 March, just after the 3rd Armored Division had entered the city of Cologne, a famous tank duel took place. A Panther tank on the street in the front of Cologne Cathedral was lying in wait for enemy tanks. Two M4 Shermans were supporting infantry and came up on the same street as the Panther. They ended up stopping just before the Cathedral because of rubble in the street and did not see the enemy Panther. The lead Sherman was knocked out, killing three of the five crew. A T26E3, nicknamed Eagle 7, was in the next street over and was called over to engage the Panther. What happened next was described by the T26E3 gunner Cpl. Clarence Smoyer:

We were told to just move into the intersection far enough to fire into the side of the enemy tank, which had its gun facing up the other street [where the Sherman had been destroyed]. However, as we entered the intersection, our driver had his periscope turned toward the Panther and saw their gun turning to meet us. When I turned our turret, I was looking into the Panther's gun tube; so instead of stopping to fire, our driver drove into the middle of the intersection so we wouldn't be a sitting target. As we were moving, I fired once. Then we stopped and I fired two more shells to make sure they wouldn't fire at our side. All three of our shells penetrated, one under the gun shield and two on the side. The two side hits went completely through and out the other side.

Four of the Panther's crew were able to successfully bail out of the stricken tank before it was destroyed. The action was recorded by a Signal Corps cameraman T/Sgt. Jim Bates.

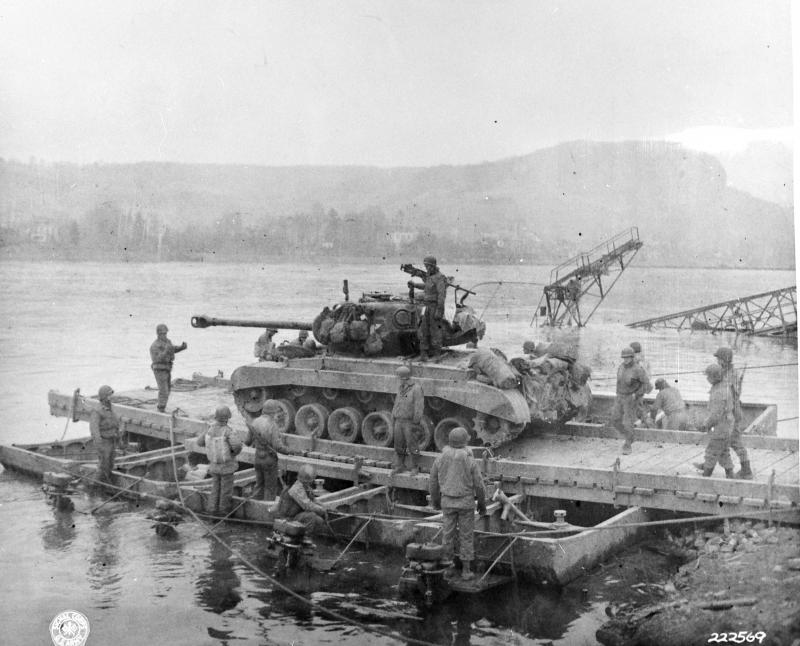
An M26 Pershing T26E3 of A Company, 14th Tank Battalion, is transported aboard a pontoon ferry built by the First Engineer Heavy Pontoon Battalion across the Rhine on 12 March 1945.

On the same day, another T26E3 was knocked out in the town of Niehl near Cologne, by a rarely-seen Nashorn 88 mm tank destroyer, at a range of under 300 yd (270 m). There were two other tank engagements involving the T26E3, with one Tiger I knocked out during the fighting around Cologne, and one Panzer IV knocked out at Mannheim.

The T26E3s with the 9th Armored Division saw action in fighting around the Roer River with one Pershing disabled by two hits from a German 150 mm field gun.

A platoon of five M26s, less one that was being serviced, played a key role in helping Combat Command B of the 9th Armored capture the Ludendorff Bridge during the Battle of Remagen on 7–8 March 1945, providing fire support to the infantry in order to take the bridgehead before the Germans could blow it up. In encounters with Tigers and Panthers, the M26 performed well. Some of the division's other tanks were able to cross the bridge, but the T26E3s were too large and heavy to cross the damaged bridge and had to wait five days before getting across the river by barge. Europe's bridges were in general not designed for heavy loads, which had been one of the original objections to sending a heavy tank to Europe.

==== Super Pershing in Europe ====
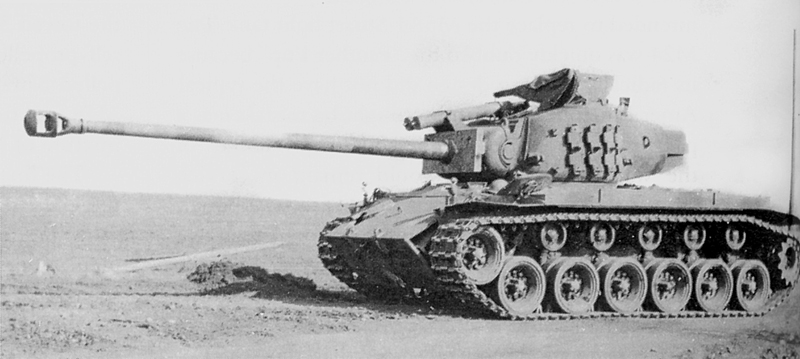
M26 "Super Pershing" after arriving in Europe and having extra frontal armor added.

A single Super Pershing (T26E4) was shipped to Europe and given additional armor to the gun mantlet and front hull by the maintenance unit before being assigned to one of the tank crews of the 3rd Armored Division. The new gun on the Super Pershing could pierce 13 inches (330 mm) of armor at 100 yards (91 m). The front hull was given two 38.1 mm steel boiler plates, bringing the front up to 38.1+ 38.1+102 mm of armor. The plates were applied at a greater slope than the underlying original hull plate. The turret had 80 mm thick Rolled Homogeneous Armor (RHA) plate from a Panther upper glacis welded to the mantlet, covering the entire front of the mantlet. There were 3 holes cut in the plate: One for the gunner’s sight, one for the barrel of the gun, and one for the M1919A4 .30 cal coaxial machine gun. This added about five tonnes to the tank weight, requiring extra armor added to the turret for balance, two 80 mm plates welded to the left and right of the gun mantlet, as well as a weight in the back of the turret in the form of an approximately 2,200 lb turret bustle. An account of the combat actions of this tank appeared in the war memoir Another River, Another Town, by John P. Irwin, who was the tank gunner. On 4 April, between Weser and Nordheim, the Super Pershing engaged and destroyed a German tank, or something resembling a tank, at a range of 1,500 yd (1,400 m). According to Zaloga, it is possible this vehicle was a Jagdpanther from the 507th Heavy Panzer Battalion. On 12 April, the Super Pershing claimed a German tank of unknown type. On 21 April, the Super Pershing was involved in a short-range tank duel with a German tank, which it knocked out with a shot to the belly. Irwin described this German tank as a Tiger II, but Zaloga was skeptical of this claim. The tank was likely a Panzer IV. After the war, the single Super Pershing in Europe was last photographed in a vehicle dump in Kassel, Germany, and was most likely scrapped.

=== Use in Okinawa ===
In May 1945, as fierce fighting continued on the island of Okinawa, and M4 tank losses mounted, plans were made to ship the M26 Pershing tanks to that battle. On 31 May 1945, a shipment of 12 M26 Pershing tanks were dispatched to the Pacific for use in the Battle of Okinawa. Due to a variety of delays, the tanks were not completely offloaded on the beach at Naha, Okinawa until 4 August. By then, fighting on Okinawa had come to an end, and VJ Day followed on 2 September 1945.

=== Use in the Korean War ===
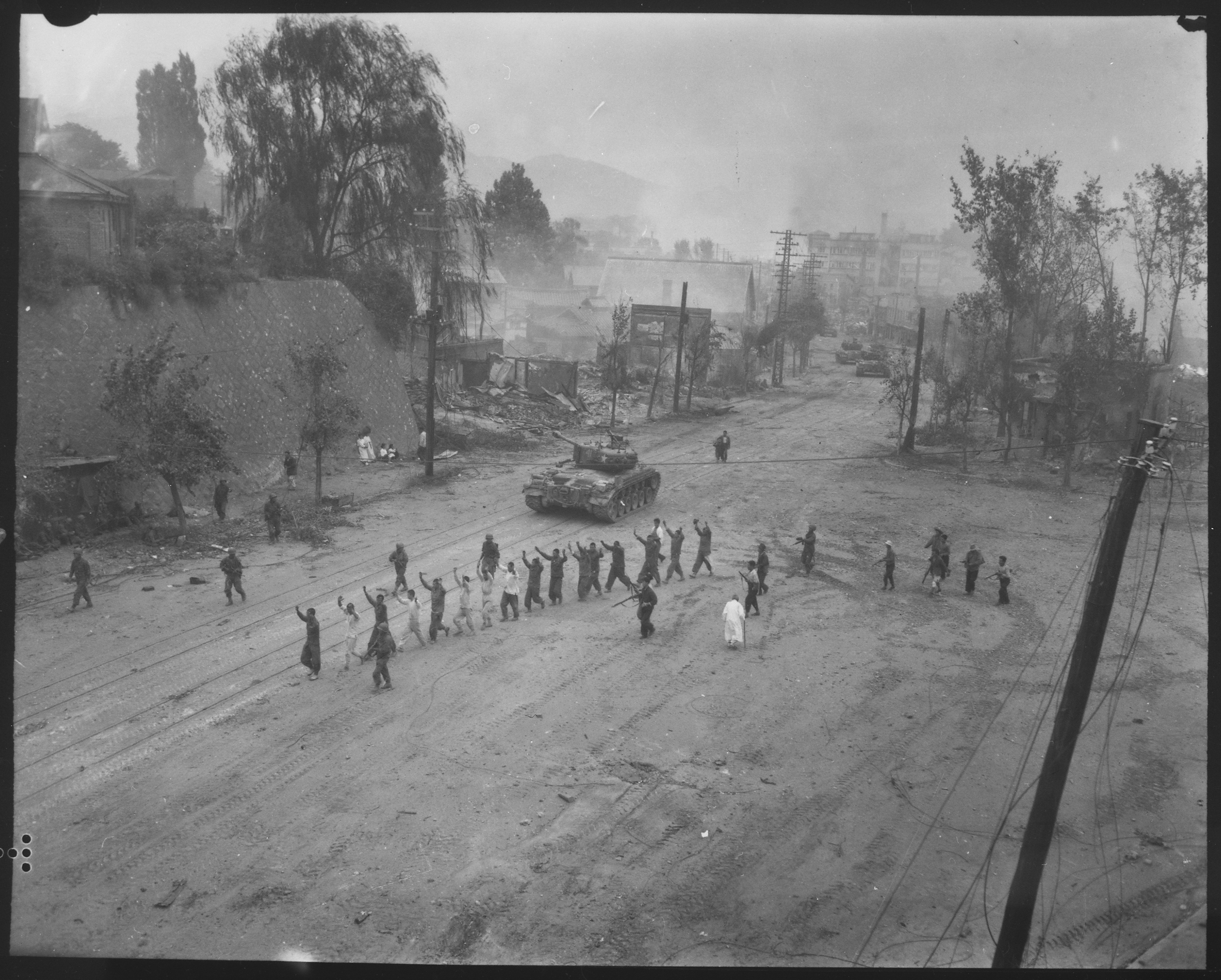
Pershing tanks in downtown Seoul during the Second Battle of Seoul in September 1950. In the foreground, United Nations troops round up North Korean prisoners-of-war.

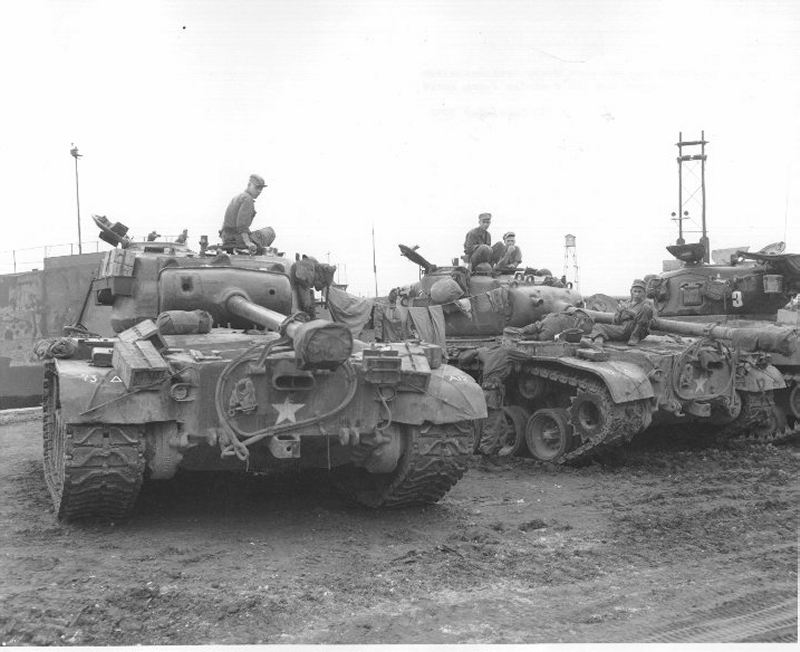
Pershing and Sherman tanks of the 73rd Heavy Tank Battalion at the Pusan Docks in South Korea.

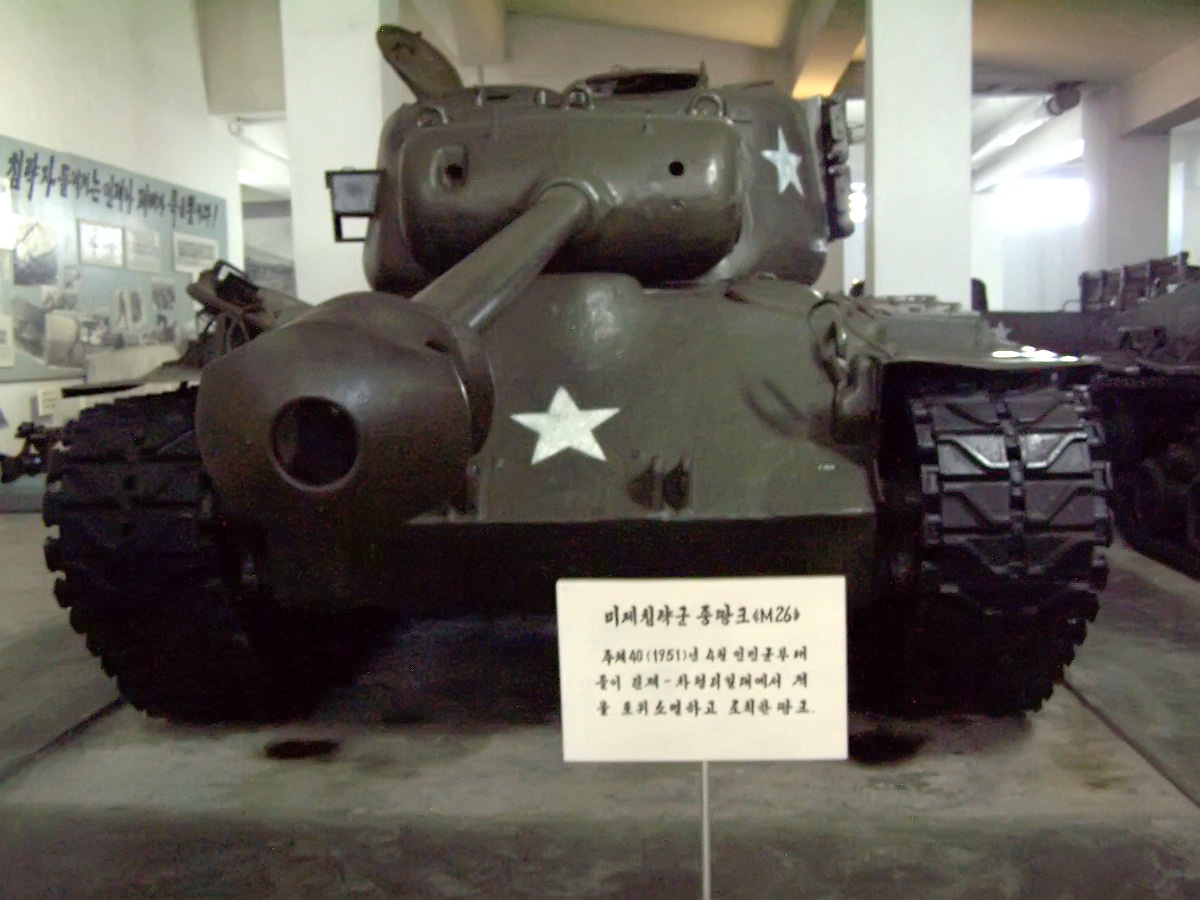
Captured Pershing on display at a North Korean museum in Pyongyang.

At the outbreak of the Korean War, only four tank companies equipped with the M24 Chaffee were operational under the U.S. Far East Command. In July 1950, when the M24 was revealed ineffective against North Korean tanks such as the T-34-85, the U.S. military hurriedly began to mobilize medium-sized tanks to deal with them. The Far East Command urgently maintained three M26 tanks, which were left unattended at the Tokyo ordnance depot, and organized into a provisional tank platoon, commanded by Lieutenant Samuel Fowler, and deployed them to South Korea. However, while defending Chinju on 31 July, all of these tanks experienced engine overheating and became immobilized due to insufficient maintenance on belts and cooling fans, and eventually all of them were self-destructed.

Around the same time, various tank battalions of the Army and a tank company from the 1st Marine Provisional Brigade, which were all fully organized armored training units, were dispatched to the Korean Peninsula along with the M26 Pershing tank. The 70th Tank Battalion at Fort Knox Kentucky had pulled World War II memorial M26s off of pedestals and reconditioned them for use, but had to fill out two companies with M4A3s. The 72nd Tank Battalion at Fort Lewis Washington and the 73rd Tank Battalion at Fort Benning Georgia were fully equipped with M26s. The 89th Medium Tank Battalion was constituted in Japan with three companies of reconditioned M4A3s and one of M26s from various bases in the Pacific; due to the shortage of M26s, most regimental tank companies had M4A3 Shermans instead. Two battalions detached from the 2nd Armored Division at Fort Hood Texas, the 6th Medium and 64th Heavy Tank Battalions, were fully equipped with M46 Patton tanks. The 1st Marine Division at Camp Pendleton California had all M4A3 howitzer tanks, which were replaced with M26s just days before boarding ships for Korea.

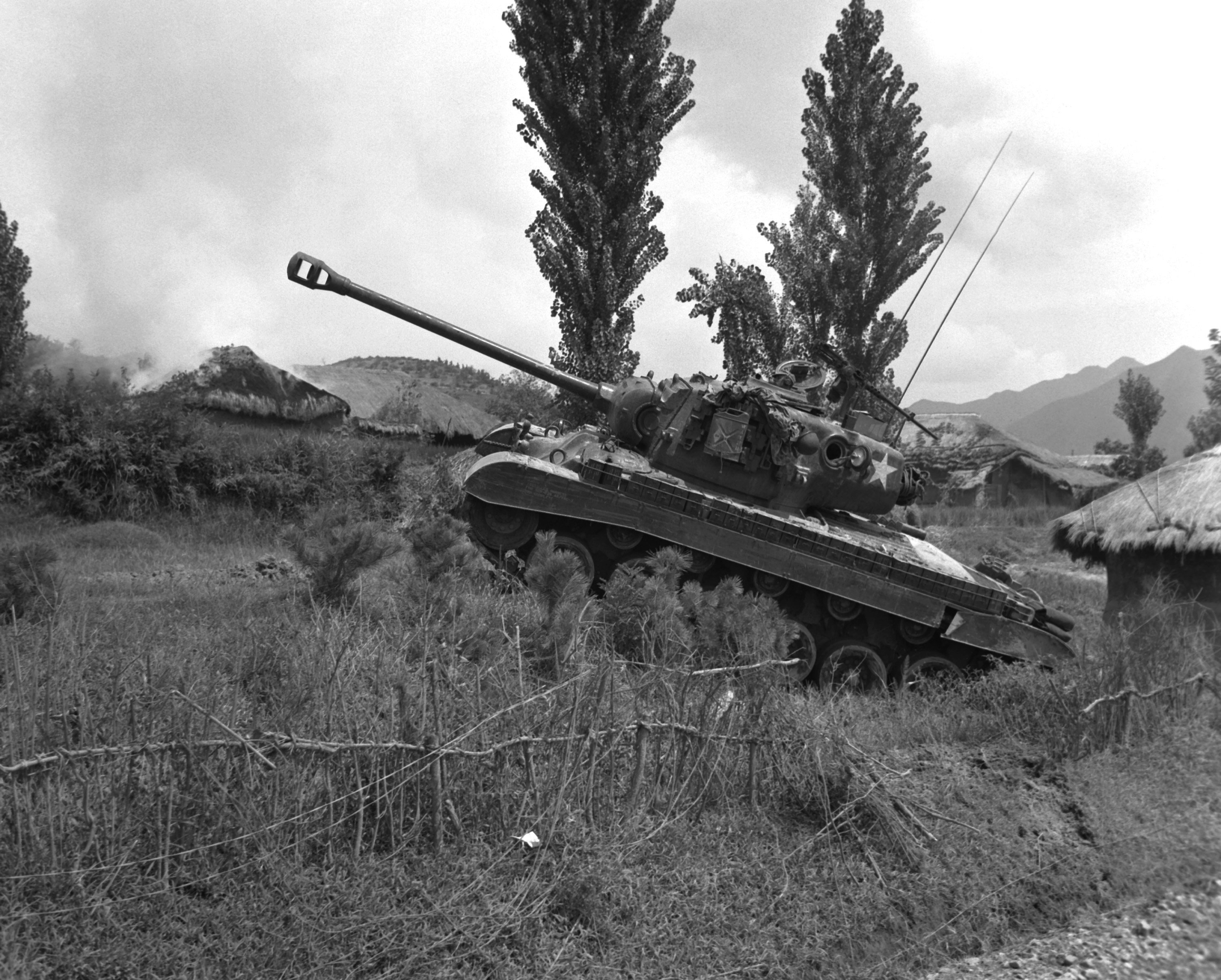
M26 Pershing in Korea

On 17 August, one M26 of the U.S. Marine Tank Company destroyed three T-34-85s of the 109th Tank Regiment of the North Korean army in a few minutes during their first contact at Obong-ri, Changnyeong. Then, during the Battle of the Bowling Alley, M26s of the 73rd Tank Battalion, which supported the ROK 1st Infantry Division during the Battle of Tabu-dong, destroyed 13 T-34-85 tanks and five SU-76M self-propelled guns. A total of 309 M26 tanks were fielded on the Korean Peninsula by the end of 1950, and 29 North Korean tanks were defeated by them during the same period. Although it had better anti-tank capability than the M4A3E8 thanks to its 90 mm gun, its underpowered engine which wasn't well suited to Korea's mountainous terrain, and its tendency to overheat quickly made it less liked among crews, and most were thus temporarily withdrawn in favor of the more reliable "Easy Eight" Sherman. The M26 tank was then gradually replaced by or upgraded in standards to the new M46 Patton tank in 1951 due to its chronic lack of mobility as the war evolved into battles between mountains.

A 1954 survey concluded that there were in all 119, mostly small scale, tank vs. tank actions involving U.S. Army and Marine units during the Korean War, with 97 T-34-85 tanks knocked out and another 18 probables. The M4A3E8 was involved in 50% of the tank actions, the M26 in 32%, and the M46 in 10%. The M26/M46 proved to be an overmatch for the T-34-85 as its 90 mm HVAP round could – at point blank range – punch all the way through the T-34 from the front glacis armor to the back, whereas the T-34-85 had difficulty penetrating the armor of the M26 or M46. The M4A3E8, firing 76 mm HVAP rounds that were widely available during the Korean War (unlike World War II), was a closer match to the T-34-85 as both tanks could destroy each other at normal combat ranges.

After November 1950, North Korean armor was rarely encountered. China entered the conflict in February 1951 with four regiments of tanks (a mix of mostly T-34-85 tanks, with a few IS-2 tanks, and some other AFVs). However, because these Chinese tanks were dispersed with the infantry, tank to tank battles with UN forces were uncommon.

With the marked decrease in tank-to-tank actions, the automotive deficiencies of the M26 in the mountainous Korean terrain became more of a liability, so some M26s were withdrawn from Korea during 1951 and replaced with M4A3 Shermans and M46 Pattons. The M45 howitzer tank variant was only used by the assault gun platoon of the 6th Medium Tank Battalion, and these six vehicles were withdrawn by January 1951.

== Europe ==
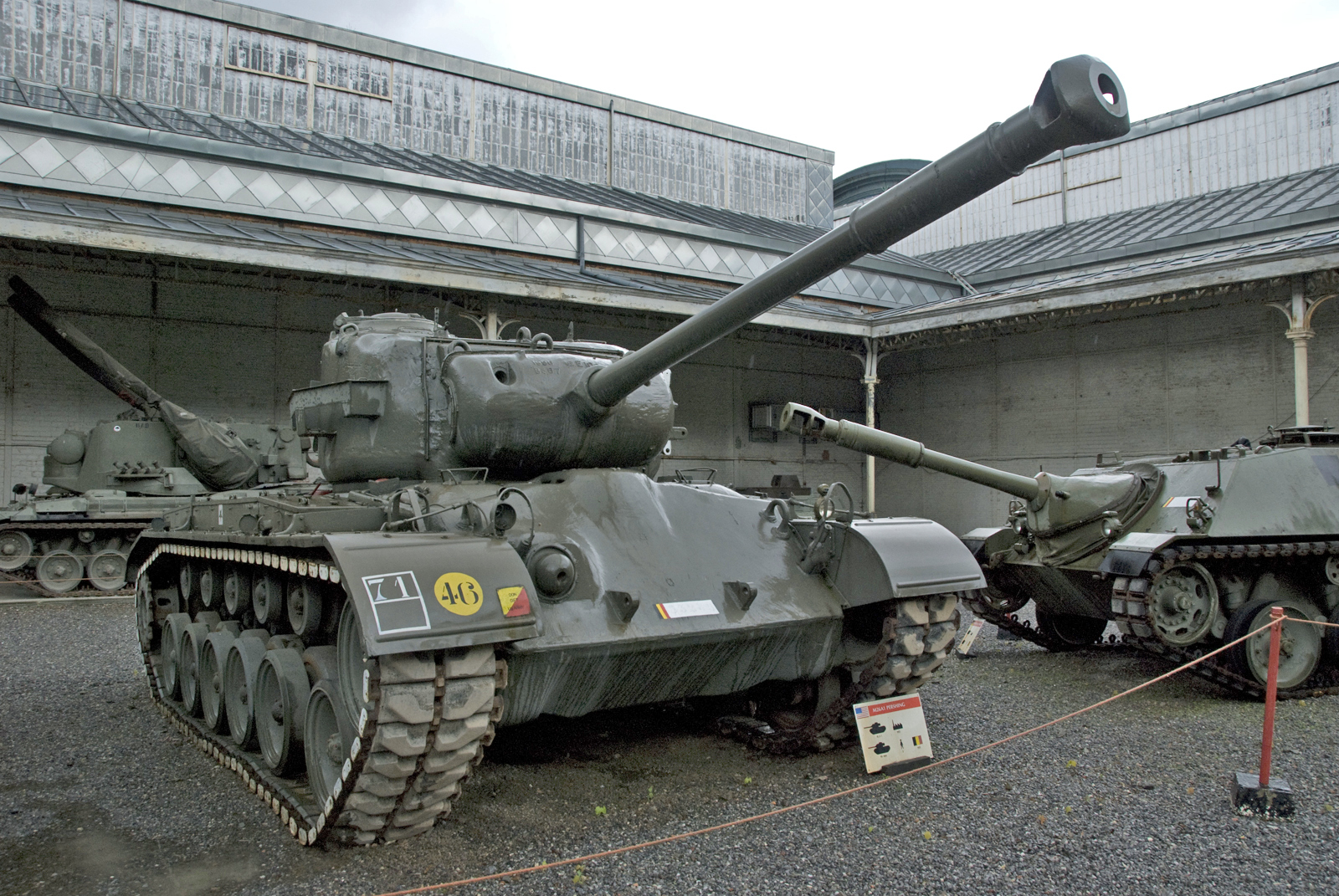
M26A1 at the Royal Army Museum of Brussels. Leased to Belgium, all M26s remained US property. This vehicle was donated to the museum in 1980.

After the end of World War II, U.S. Army units on occupation duty in Germany were converted into constabulary units, a quasi-police force designed to control the flow of refugees and black marketing; combat units were converted to light motorized units and spread throughout the U.S. occupation zone. By the summer of 1947, the army required a combat reserve to back up the thinly spread constabulary; in the following year, the 1st Infantry Division was reconstituted and consolidated, containing three regimental tank companies and a divisional tank battalion. The 1948 tables of organization and equipment for an infantry division included 123 M26 Pershing tanks and 12 M45 howitzer tanks. In the summer of 1951, three more infantry divisions and the 2nd Armored Division were sent to West Germany as a part of the NATO Augmentation Program. While M26 Pershings disappeared from Korea during 1951, tank units deploying to West Germany were equipped with them, until replaced with M47 Pattons during 1952–53. The 1952–53 tables of organization and equipment for an infantry division included 135 M47 Patton tanks replacing M26s and M46s.

In 1952, the Belgian Army received 423 M26 and M26A1 Pershings, leased free of charge as part of a Mutual Defense Assistance Program, then the official designation of U.S. military aid to its allies. The tanks were mostly used to equip mobilizable reserve units of battalion strength: 2nd, 3rd and 4th Régiments de Guides/Regiment Gidsen (Belgian units have official names in both French and Dutch); 7th, 9th and 10th Régiments de Lanciers/Regiment Lansiers and finally the 2nd, 3rd and 5th Bataillon de Tanks Lourds/Bataljon Zware Tanks. However, in the spring of 1953, M26s for three months equipped the 1st Heavy Tank Battalion of the 1st Infantry Division, an active unit, before they were replaced by M47s.

In 1961, the number of reserve units was reduced, and the reserve system reorganized, with the M26s equipping the 1st and 3rd Escadron de Tanks/Tank Escadron as a general reserve of the infantry arm. In 1969, all M26s were phased out.

As the U.S. Army units in West Germany reequipped with M47s in 1952–1953, France and Italy also received M26 Pershings; while France quickly replaced them with M47 Pattons, Italy continued to use them operationally through 1963.

== Variants ==
- M26 (T26E3). M3 gun with double-baffle muzzle brake. Main production model.
- M26A1. M3A1 gun with bore evacuator and single-baffle muzzle brake.
- T26E4 (T26E4 Pilot Prototype Number 1). Often mistakenly called the "T26E1-1" due to having been based on that vehicle. The T26E1-1 was the first pilot of the T26E1. This single tank was later converted into the first pilot of the T26E4, a process which involved replacing the main gun with a T15E1 gun with single piece ammo and fitted with large exterior stabilizer springs. After arriving in Europe, it was attached with extra armor plates taken from destroyed Panther tanks. (used in combat).
- T26E4. Experimental version armed with a long T15E2 gun with two-part ammunition; improved mounting removed the need for external springs.
- M26E1. longer T54 gun with single-part ammunition. (post war)
- M26E2. New engine and transmission and M3A1 gun. Reclassified as the M46 Patton. (post war)
- T26E2, eventually standardized for use as the Medium Tank M45—a close support vehicle with a 105 mm howitzer (74 rounds).
- T26E5. Prototype with thicker armor—a maximum of 279 mm— based on the experience of the heavily armored assault tank M4A3E2.

Prototypes, variants, and conversions
Model	Main armament	Glacis thickness (inches)	Suspension	Transmission	Engine	Tread width (inches)	Production dates	Number produced	Notes
T20	76 mm M1A1	3	HVSS	Torqmatic Model 30-30B	GAN	16-9/16	May 1943	1	First test of new hydraulic torque converter transmission, which proved leaky and prone to overheating
T20E3	76 mm M1A1	3	torsion bar	Torqmatic Model 30-30B	GAN	18	July 1943	1	Effort to improve the ride and ground pressure
T22	76 mm M1A1	3	HVSS	modified M4A3 Sherman	GAN	16-9/16	June 1943	2	Reversion to the known reliable transmission of the M4
T22E1	75 mm M3 autoloader	3	HVSS	modified M4A3 Sherman	GAN	16-9/16	Aug 1943	1	Test of autoloader for 76 mm gun, new smaller two-man turret with only a gunner and commander, converted from a T22 tank
T23	76 mm M1A1	3	VVSS	Electrical	GAN	16-9/16	Jan–Dec 1943	250+	Used same vertical volute spring suspension (VVSS) of the M4 Sherman. New cast turret mounting the 76 mm gun (used for the 76 mm M4)
T23E3	76 mm M1A1	3	torsion bar	Electrical	GAN	19	Aug. 1944	1	Test of torsion bars, electrical transmission, and 19-in tracks together
T23E4	76 mm M1A1	3	HVSS	Electrical	GAN	23	late 1944	3	HVSS, electrical transmission, and 23in tracks
T25	90 mm T7	3	HVSS	Electrical	GAN	23	Jan 1944	2	Test of 90 mm gun and electrical transmission on converted T23s. The 90 mm T7 was later standardized as the 90 mm M3
T25E1	90 mm M3	3	torsion bar	Torqmatic	GAF	19	Feb–May 1944	40	Improved version of Model 30-30B Torqmatic transmission. The Ford GAF engine was a minor modification of the GAN engine.
T26	90 mm M3	4	torsion bar	Electrical	GAN	24	Oct 1944	1	Weighed 95,100 lbs, with 90 mm gun, 4 in armor, electrical transmission
T26E1	90 mm M3	4	torsion bar	Torqmatic	GAF	24	Feb–May 1944	10	Prototype model selected for full production after testing
T26E2	105 mm howitzer M4	4	torsion bar	Torqmatic	GAF	24	Jul 1945	185	Standardized as M45 tank post-war
T26E3 / M26	90 mm M3	4	torsion bar	Torqmatic	GAF	24/23	Nov. 1944	2000+	Standardized as M26 tank in March 1945, later production had 23in tracks
T26E4	90 mm T15E1, T15E2	4	torsion bar	Torqmatic	GAF	24	Nov. 1944	25	"Super Pershing", the first pilot was a converted T26E1 and the only one to see combat. Its T15E1 gun used one-piece ammunition. All other T26E4s had the T15E2 with two-piece ammunition
T26E5	90 mm M3	6	torsion bar	Torqmatic	GAF	23	June–July 1945	27	Based on the experience of the M4A3E2 "Jumbo" assault tank. Uparmored T26E3, weighed 102,300 lbs. Tracks could take 5 in "duckbill" extenders
M26E1	90 mm T54	4	torsion bar	Torqmatic	GAF	23	after June 1945	25	Improved version of "Super Pershing" high-velocity 90 mm gun and ammunition with short, fat propellant casing instead of very long casing. Converted from M26 tanks
M26E2 / M46	90 mm M3A1	4	torsion bar	Allison CD-850-1 cross-drive	Continental AV-1790-3	23	1948–1949	1 / 800	Upgrade of existing M26. New compact transmission and engine with increased power to 810 hp (600 kW). Improved 90 mm M3 gun, with bore evacuator and other modifications. Additional conversions beyond the prototype were redesignated as the T40, then were standardized as the M46 Patton. A total of 800 M26 tanks were converted to the M46.
M26A1	90 mm M3A1	4	torsion bar	Torqmatic	GAF	23	1948	1200?	Lack of funds postwar prevented conversion of all of the M26 tanks to the M46. Most of the remaining M26s only received a gun upgrade with the M3A1 gun.
M26 T99	x2 T99 multiple rocket launchers	4	N/A	N/A	N/A	N/A	1945	N/A	Potentially made to replace the T34 Calliope and T40 Whizbang, it was tested at the Aberdeen Proving Grounds in late 1945. However, it must've proved unsatisfactory and was likely cancelled in 1946. It had a total of 44 rocket tubes, 22 on each side of the turret.

== Operators ==
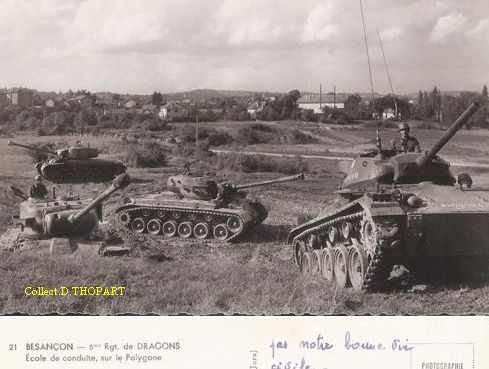
Postcard of M24 Chaffee and M26 Pershing tanks of the French 6th Dragoon Regiment of Besançon in 1955.

- Belgium
- Italy
- France
- South Korea: A number of M26s were transferred from withdrawing U.S. troops after the Korean War.
- Soviet Union: Received one through the Lend-Lease program; this was allegedly a T26 model
- United Kingdom: Received twelve through the Lend-Lease program, presumably six T26 and six T26E3
- United States

== See also ==
- Tanks of the United States
- Tanks of the United States in the world wars
- Tanks of the United States in the Cold War
- 240 mm T92 Howitzer Motor Carriage
- List of "M" series military vehicles
- List of named tanks

=== Comparable tanks ===
- German Tiger I and Panther
- German Tiger II – comparable to T26E4 "Super Pershing" and in armor with the T26E5
- Soviet IS-85 and IS-1
- Soviet T-44
- British Centurion tank
