= Tanks of the United States in the Cold War =

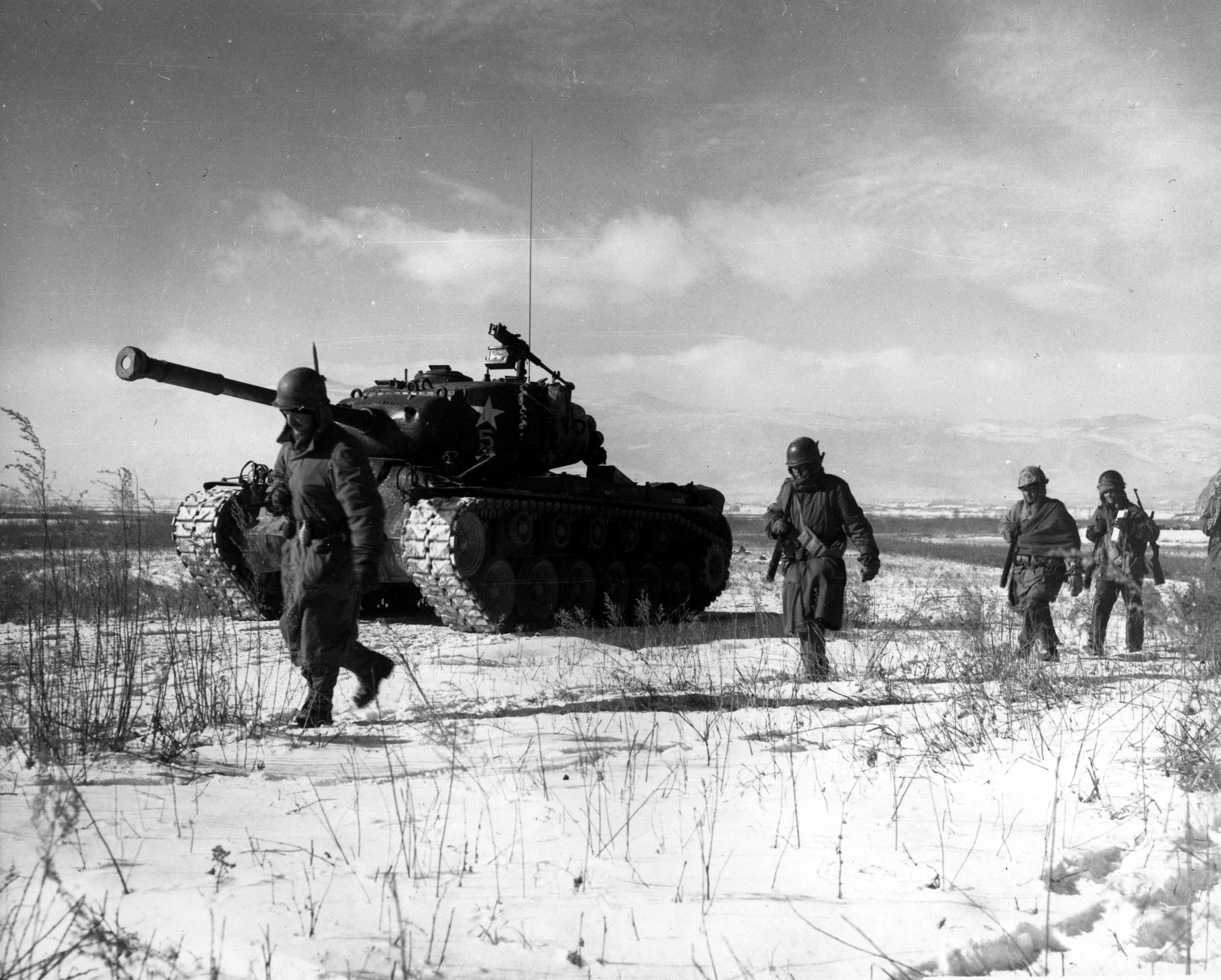
Marines of 1st Marine Division at the Battle of Chosin Reservoir supported by M46 Patton tank.

This article deals with the history and development of American tanks from the end of World War II and during the Cold War.

== Light tanks ==
=== M24 Chaffee ===
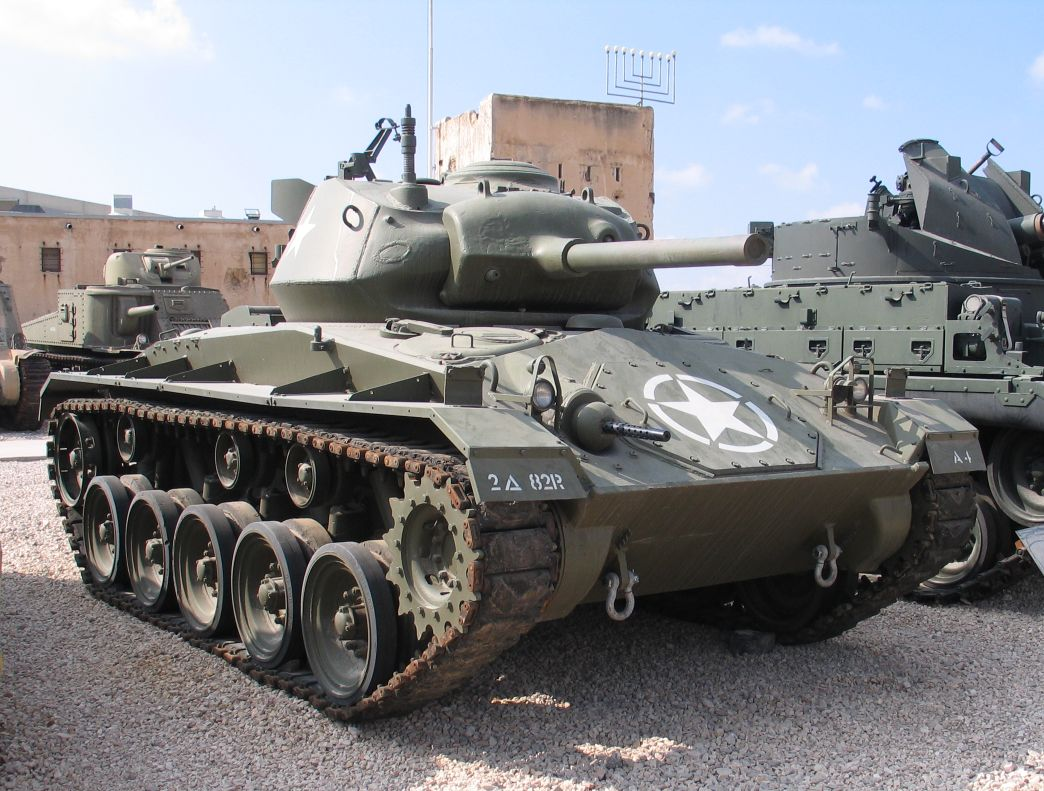
M24 Chaffee

In the Korean War M24 Chaffees were the first U.S. tanks to fight the North Korean T-34-85s. The M24 fared poorly against the much better-armed and armored medium tanks. When the war began in June 1950, the four American infantry divisions on occupation duty in Japan had no medium tanks at all, having only one active tank company (equipped with M24 Chaffee light tanks) each. When these divisions were sent to Korea at the end of June 1950, they soon found that the 75 mm gun on the M24 could not penetrate the armor of North Korean T-34 tanks, which had no difficulty penetrating the M24's thin armor. M24s were more successful later in the war in their reconnaissance role, supported by heavier tanks.

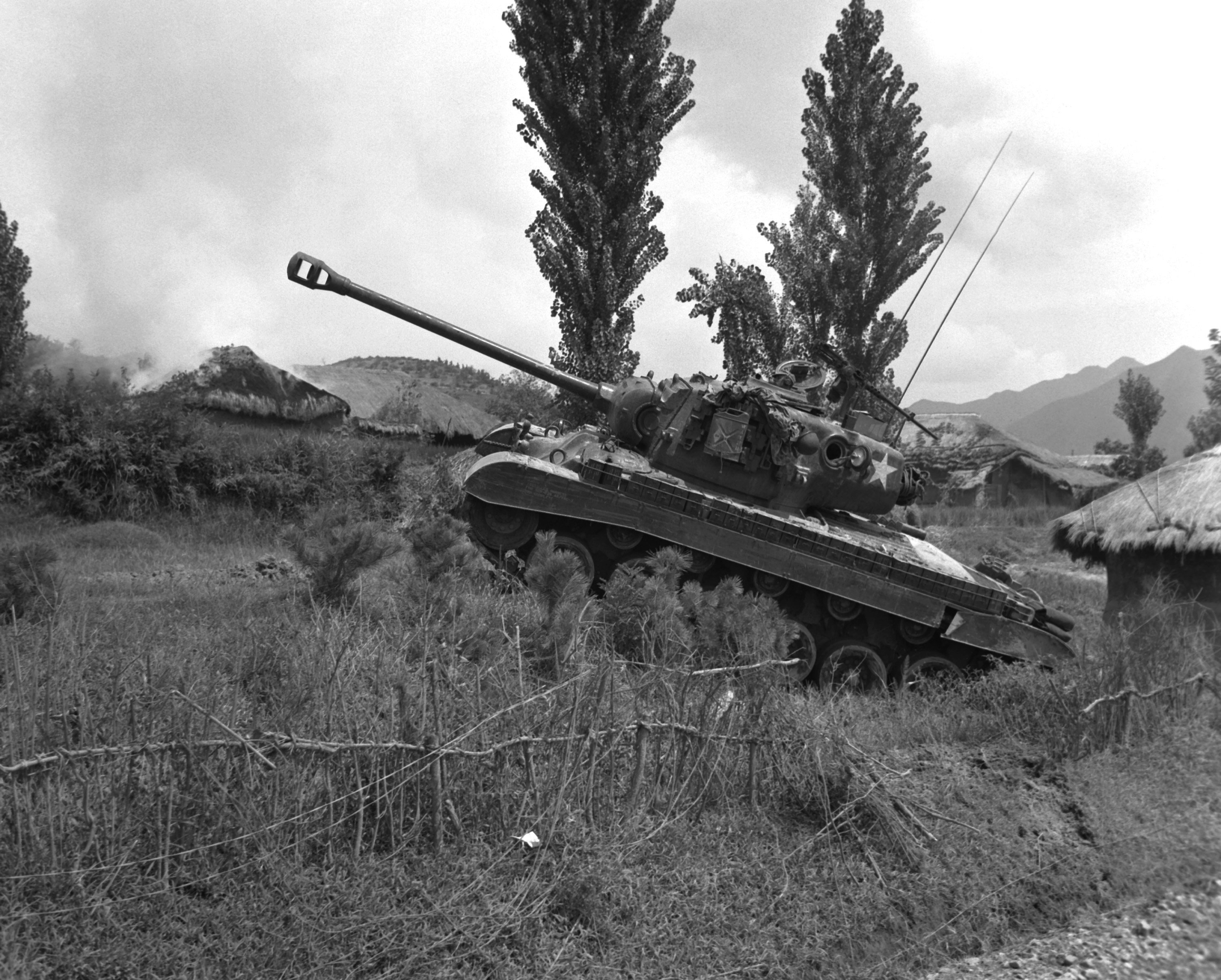
USMC M26 Pershing in Korea, 1950.

=== M41 Walker Bulldog ===
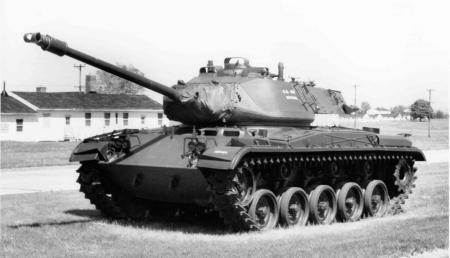
M41 Walker Bulldog

The development of the M41 Walker Bulldog began in 1947 to replace the M24 Chaffee. The vehicle was designed to be air-transportable and carry heavier firepower provided by an advanced 76 mm gun. The M41 was an agile and well armed. On the other hand, it was noisy, fuel-hungry and heavy enough to cause problems with air transport.

The Walker Bulldog saw limited combat with the Army during the Korean War, but for the most part the conflict served as a testing ground to work out the tank's deficiencies, especially with its rangefinder. At the time, it was designated as the T-41, and was rushed to the battlefield even before its first test run. This was because the North Koreans were supplied with Soviet T-34 tanks, which were superior to the M-24. By 1961, 150 were delivered to the Japan Ground Self-Defense Force to supplement their Type 61 medium tanks.

=== T92 ===
The T92 Light Tank was designed in the 1950s by Aircraft Armaments as an airborne/airdropped replacement for the much heavier M41 Walker Bulldog. The main gun was a 76 mm cannon on a low profile turret. It had a crew of four with a semi-automatic loading system. Study of the Soviet PT-76 led to a new swimming requirement for light tanks, for which the design could not be modified, and thus the T-92 was never used.

=== M551 Sheridan ===
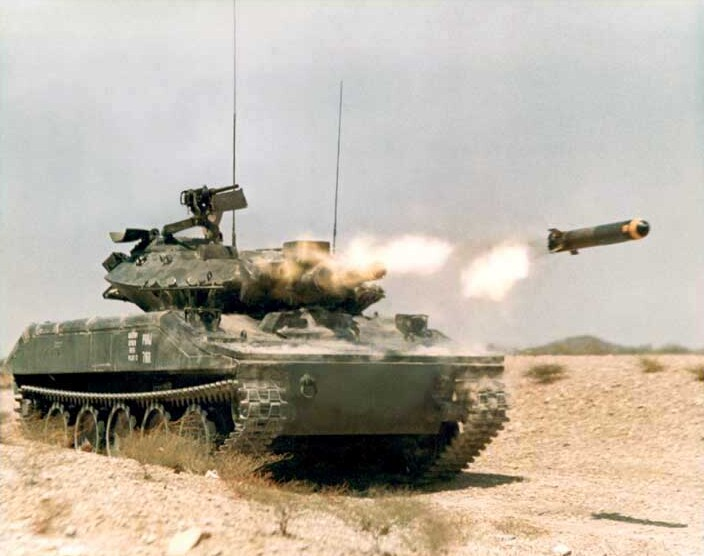
XM551 Sheridan

Plans started to build an even lighter replacement mounting the same gun, resulting in the T-71 and T-92 test designs. Two prototypes of the 19 ton T-92 were ordered. However, as the prototypes were entering testing, information about the new Soviet PT-76 tank became available. The PT-76 was amphibious, and soon there were demands that any U.S. light tank be able to swim as well. The T-92 was already in the prototype stage and could not be easily refitted for this role, so the design of an entirely new system started as the XM551 Sheridan.

The vehicle proved to be very noisy and unreliable under combat conditions. The armor was thin enough that it could be penetrated even by heavy machine gun rounds as well as being highly vulnerable to mines.

==== Vietnam War ====
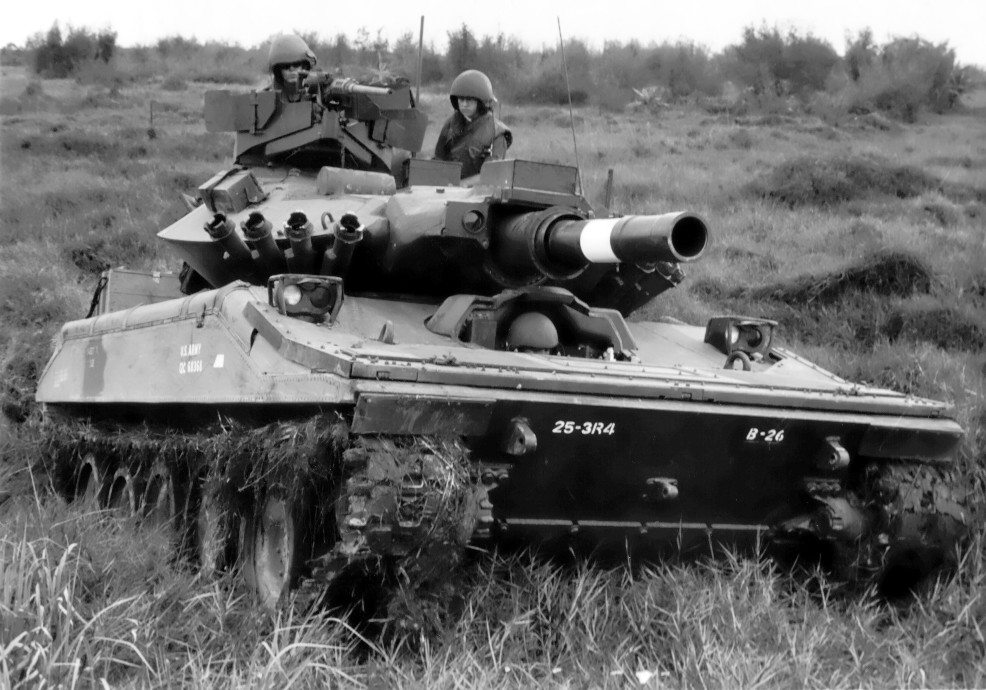
An M551 Sheridan and crew of the 3rd Squadron, 4th Armored Cavalry in Vietnam.

The Sheridan saw extensive action in the Vietnam War, being assigned to nearly all armored cavalry squadrons in country. In 1969, armored cavalry units began replacing their M48 Patton tanks.

The battle reports from the troops were sometimes glowing, while the reports higher up the chain of command were often negative. A 1969 evaluation of the vehicles found the M551 was employed in reconnaissance, night patrol and road clearing, accumulating 39,455 road miles and 520 combat missions, with a ready rate of 81%. Despite vulnerability to rockets and mines, it was judged worth applying modifications and equip all cavalry squadrons with the Sheridan.

The Sheridan was much appreciated by the infantry who were desperate for direct-fire support, which generally served in combination with ACAVs (M113s) as armored cavalry units consisted of both M113s and M551s as part of their table of organization and equipment. Armor units consisted solely of tanks (minus headquarters company) and mechanized infantry units consisted solely of M113s. In this role the real problem with the Sheridan was its limited ammunition load of only 20 rounds and 8 missiles (though M551s in Vietnam service were not equipped with missiles or their guidance equipment, increasing the basic load of conventional rounds).

A common field modification was to mount a large steel shield, known as an "ACAV set" (Armored Cavalry Assault Vehicle), around the commander's .50-cal. (12.7 mm) gun, allowing it to be fired with some level of protection. The driver has an unusual rotating hatch which has vision blocks when rotated forward. Included with the set was an extra layer of steel belly armor which was bolted onto the vehicle's bottom, although only covering from the front to halfway to the end, possibly due to weight reasons.

A standard modification made during the mid-1970s was the addition of the "cereal bowl" commander's cupola. This mod came about by the broken rib effect that occurred when the Sheridan fired conventional rounds: the recoil would pitch the tank commander against the armor plating, resulting in cracked ribs.

==== Post-Vietnam ====
The Army began to phase out the Sheridan in 1978, although at the time there was no real replacement. Nevertheless, the 82nd Airborne were able to keep them on until 1996. The Sheridan was the only air-deployable tank in the inventory, and as an elite force they had considerably more "pull" than general infantry and armor units who were forced to get rid of them. Their units were later upgraded to the M551A1 model, including a thermal sighting system for the commander and gunner.

The Sheridan's only air drop in combat occurred during Operation Just Cause in Panama in 1989, when 14 M551's were deployed; four were transported by C-5 Galaxies and ten were dropped by air, but two Sheridans were destroyed upon landing. The Sheridans' performance received mixed reviews. They were lauded by their operators and some commanders as providing firepower in needed situations to destroy hard targets. However, the Sheridans' employment of only HEAT rounds limited their effectiveness against reinforced concrete construction.

51 Sheridans were deployed in the Gulf War as some of the first tanks sent. They were not very effective against the Russian-built T-72s. Their role was limited by age and light armor to reconnaissance, possibly 6 or less Shillelagh missiles were fired at Iraqi bunkers, these fewer than a half-dozen missiles, were the only time that the Shillelagh had been fired in a combat environment, from the inventory of the aforementioned 88,000 missiles produced.

Several attempts to upgun or replace the Sheridan have been made over the years since it was introduced, but none proved successful. Several experimental versions of the Sheridan mounting a new turret carrying the NATO-standard 105 mm gun were made, but the resulting recoil was so great as to make the vehicle almost unusable. Several possible replacements for the M551 were tested as a part of the XM8 Armored Gun System effort of the 1980s, but none of these entered service. The Stryker wheeled M1128 mobile gun system has filled this role in the United States.

=== Armored Gun System ===
The Armored Gun System was a 1980s program to replace the M551 Sheridan in the 82nd Airborne Division. United Defense's M8 AGS was selected in 1992, but the program was canceled in 1997.

==== Expeditionary Tank ====
The Expeditionary Tank was developed by Teledyne Vehicle Systems as a competitor to the Armored Gun System program. In the late 1970s Teledyne Vehicle Systems carried out several studies on a highly mobile light tracked vehicle, which could be used for a variety of tasks. The in-house trials lasted from 1980 to 1981. By 1982 a detailed design had been decided. The first prototype was completed in December 1983. A 1986 test firing took place. After the program had proved to be a success, it was discontinued.

==== Stingray ====
Eliminated from the AGS competition, the Cadillac Gage's Stingray light tank is used by Thailand's armed forces.

==== M8 armored gun system ====
United Defense' M8 armored gun system was selected in 1992 for further development. Prototypes were made in the 1990s but the program was canceled for budgetary reasons in 1997. The eight-wheeled M1128 mobile gun system replaced this project.

== Medium tanks ==
=== M46 Patton ===
The mobility of the M26 Pershing was deemed unsatisfactory for a medium tank, as it used the same engine that powered the much lighter M4 Sherman. Work began in 1948 on replacing the power plant in the M26 Pershing. Modifications continued to accumulate, and eventually the Bureau of Ordnance decided that the tank needed its own unique designation. When the rebuild began in November 1949, the upgraded M26 received a new power plant and a main gun with bore evacuator, and the M46 Patton designation. Less than a thousand were upgraded to M46 standard.

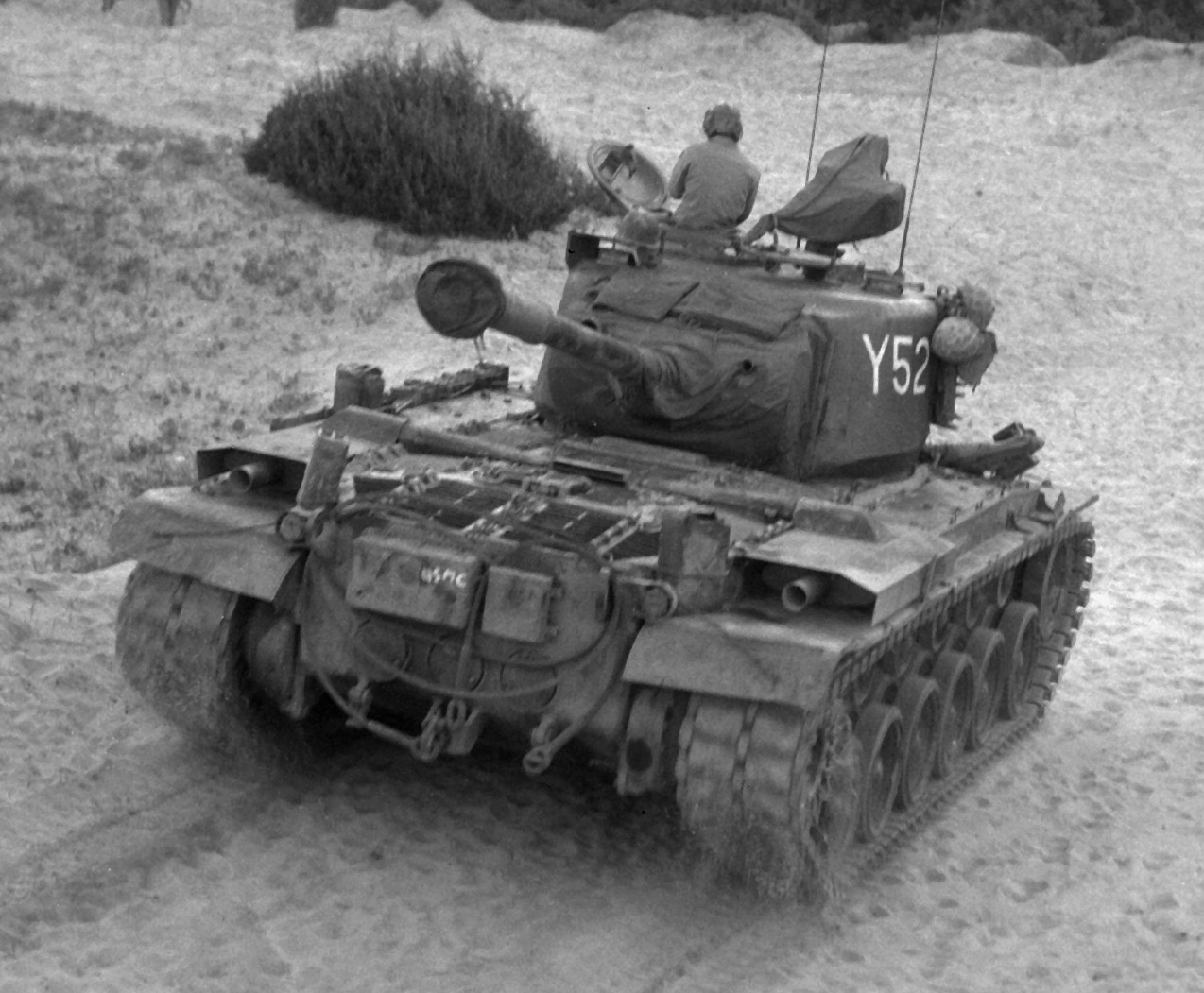
USMC M46 in Korea, 8 July 1952.

On 8 August 1950 the first M46 Pattons landed in South Korea. The tank proved superior to the much lighter North Korean T-34-85, which were encountered in relatively small numbers. By the end of 1950, 200 M46 Pattons had been fielded, forming about 15% of U.S. tank strength in Korea; the balance of 1,326 tanks shipped to Korea during 1950 included 679 M4A3 Shermans, 309 M26 Pershings, and 138 M24 Chaffee light tanks. Subsequent shipments of M46 and M46A1 Pattons allowed all remaining M26 Pershings to be withdrawn during 1951, and most Sherman equipped units were also reequipped.

=== M47 Patton ===
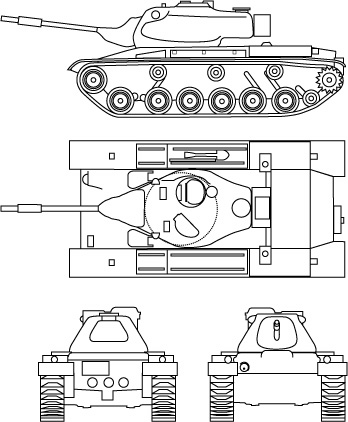
Line drawing of the M47.

Although a new power plant corrected the mobility and reliability problems of the M26 Pershing, the subsequently renamed M46 was considered a stopgap solution that would be replaced later by the T42 medium tank. However, after fighting erupted in Korea, the Army decided it needed the new tank earlier than planned. The M47 Patton was the second tank of the Patton series, and one of the U.S Army's principal medium gun tanks of the Cold War.

It had a 90 mm gun and a crew of 5. The M47 was the U.S. Army and Marine Corps primary tank, intended to replace the M46 Patton and M4 Sherman tanks. Although roughly similar (from a distance) to the later M48 and M60, these were completely new tank designs. Many different M47 Patton models remain in service internationally. The M47 was the last U.S. tank to have a bow-mounted machine gun in the hull. Despite it being the primary tank of the U.S., it never saw combat while in U.S. service.

=== M48 Patton ===
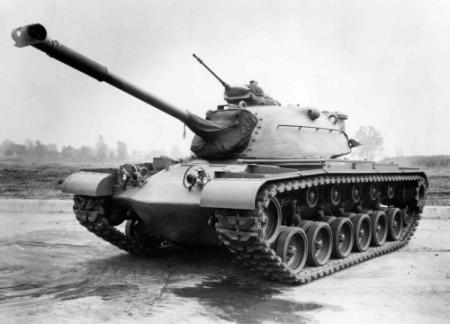
M48A1

In early 1951, the U.S. initiated the design of the M48 Patton, designated the T-48 with a 90 mm cannon. The T48 featured a new turret, new redesigned hull and an improved suspension. The hull machine gunner position was removed, reducing the crew to four. Nearly 12,000 M48s were built from 1952 to 1959. The early designs, up to the M48A2, were powered by a gasoline 12-cylinder engine which was coupled with an auxiliary 8-cylinder engine. The gas engines gave the tank a short operating range and were prone to catching fire when hit. This version was considered unreliable.

The M48s saw extensive action during the Vietnam War, with over 600 Pattons deployed. The initial M48s landed with the Marines in 1965. Remaining Pattons deployed to South Vietnam were in three U.S. Army battalions, the 1-77th Armor near the demilitarized zone, the 1-69th Armor in the Central Highlands, and the 2-34th Armor near the Mekong Delta. Each battalion consisted of approximately 57 tanks. M48s were also used by Armored Cavalry Squadrons until replaced by M551 Sheridan. The M67A1 flamethrower tank (nicknamed the Zippo) was an M48 variant used in Vietnam.

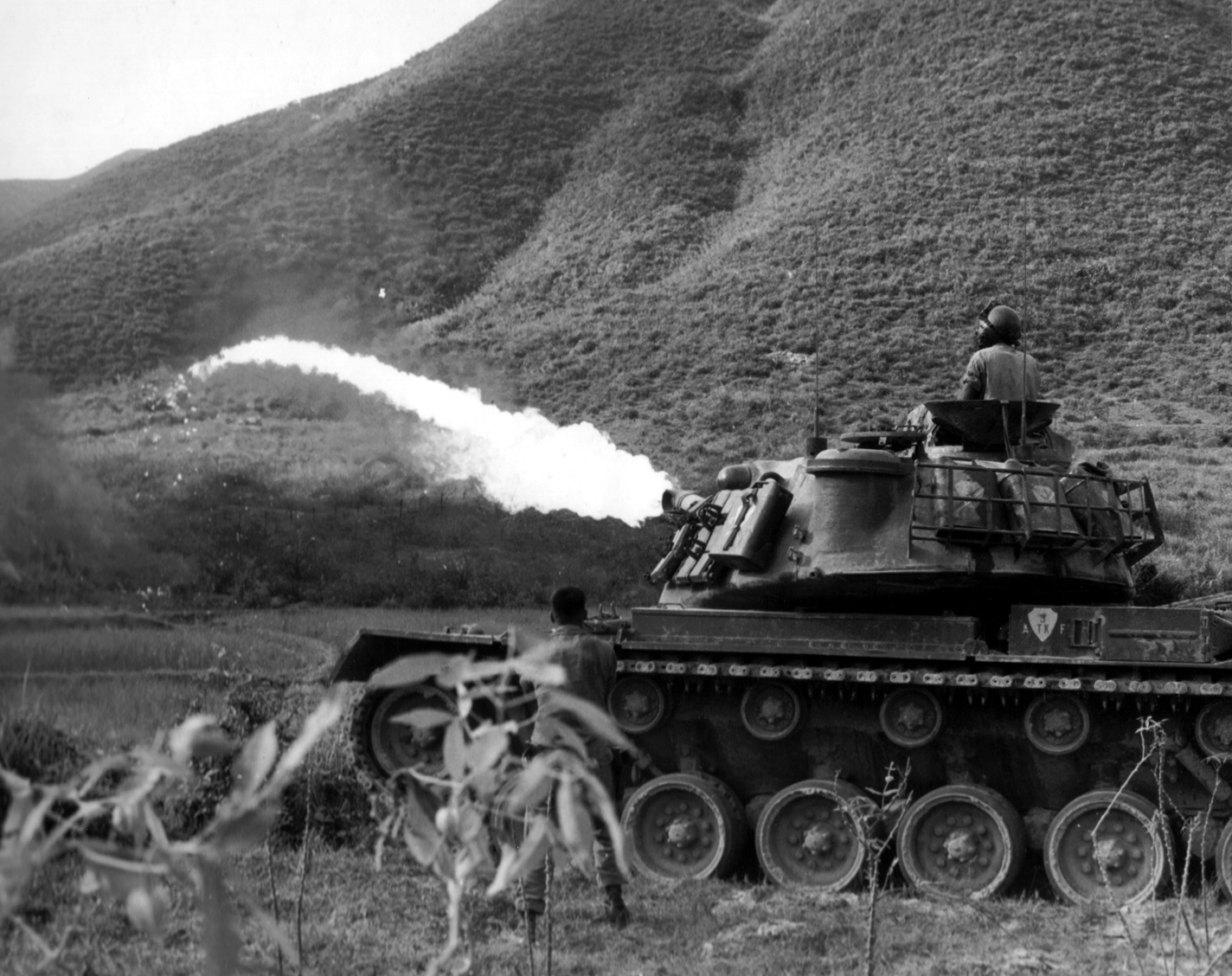
A USMC M67 "Zippo" in action near Da Nang, Vietnam.

The M48 Patton has the distinction of playing a unique role in an event that was destined to radically alter the conduct of armored warfare. When U.S. forces commenced redeployment operations, many of the M48A3 Pattons were turned over to the Army of the Republic of Vietnam (ARVN) forces, in particular creating the ARVN 20th Tank Regiment; which supplemented their M41 Walker Bulldog units. During the North Vietnamese Army (NVA) Easter Offensive in 1972, tank clashes between NVA T-54/PT-76 and ARVN M48/M41 units became commonplace. But on 23 April 1972, tankers of the 20th Tank Regiment were attacked by an NVA infantry-tank team, which was equipped with the new 9M14M Malyutka (NATO designation: Sagger) wire guided anti-tank missile. During this battle, one M48A3 Patton tank and one M113 ACAV were destroyed, becoming the first losses to the Sagger missile; losses that would echo on an even larger scale a year later during the Yom Kippur War in the Middle East in 1973.

Men of Troop B, 1st Squadron, 10th Cavalry Regiment, 4th Infantry Division, and their M48 Patton tank move through the jungle in the Central Highlands of Vietnam, June 1969.

The M48s performed admirably in Vietnam in the infantry-support role. However, there were few actual tank versus tank battles. The M48s provided adequate protection for its crew from small arms, mines, and rocket-propelled grenades.

In the mid-1970s, the M48A5 upgrade was developed to allow the vehicle to carry the heavier 105 mm gun. This was designed to bring the M48s up to speed with the M60 tanks then in regular use. Most of the M48s were placed into service with reserve units by this time. By the mid-1990s, the M48s were phased out.

=== T54 ===
The T54 was a series of prototype tanks of the 1950s. Three tanks were built with different turrets and a 105 mm gun, were mounted on the M48 Patton chassis. The original T54 had a conventional turret with an autoloader, while the turret on T54E1 was of an oscillating design with an autoloader, and the one on T54E2 was conventional with a human loader. The turret on T54E1 was similar to that of the T69 in its oscillating design and in that it held a crew of three and a nine-round drum autoloader under the gun. The T54E1 was abandoned in 1956.

==== T95 ====
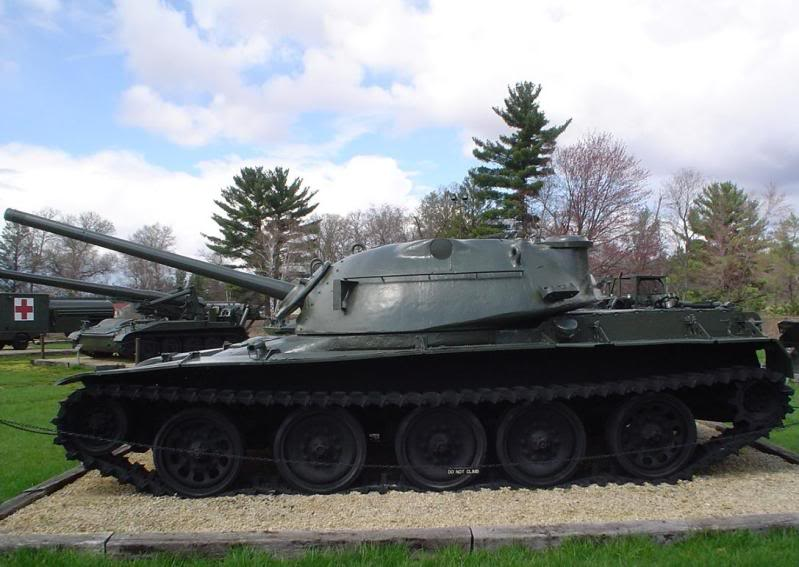
T95 Medium Tank

The T95 medium tank was developed from 1955 to 1959. These tanks used many advanced or unusual features, such as siliceous-cored armor, the APFSDS-firing 90 mm T208 smoothbore gun in a rigid mounting without recoil, a new transmission, and the OPTAC fire-control system, which incorporated the T53 Optical Tracking, Acquisition and Ranging (OPTAR) system, emitted pulsed beams of intense but incoherent infrared light.

=== M26 Pershing ===
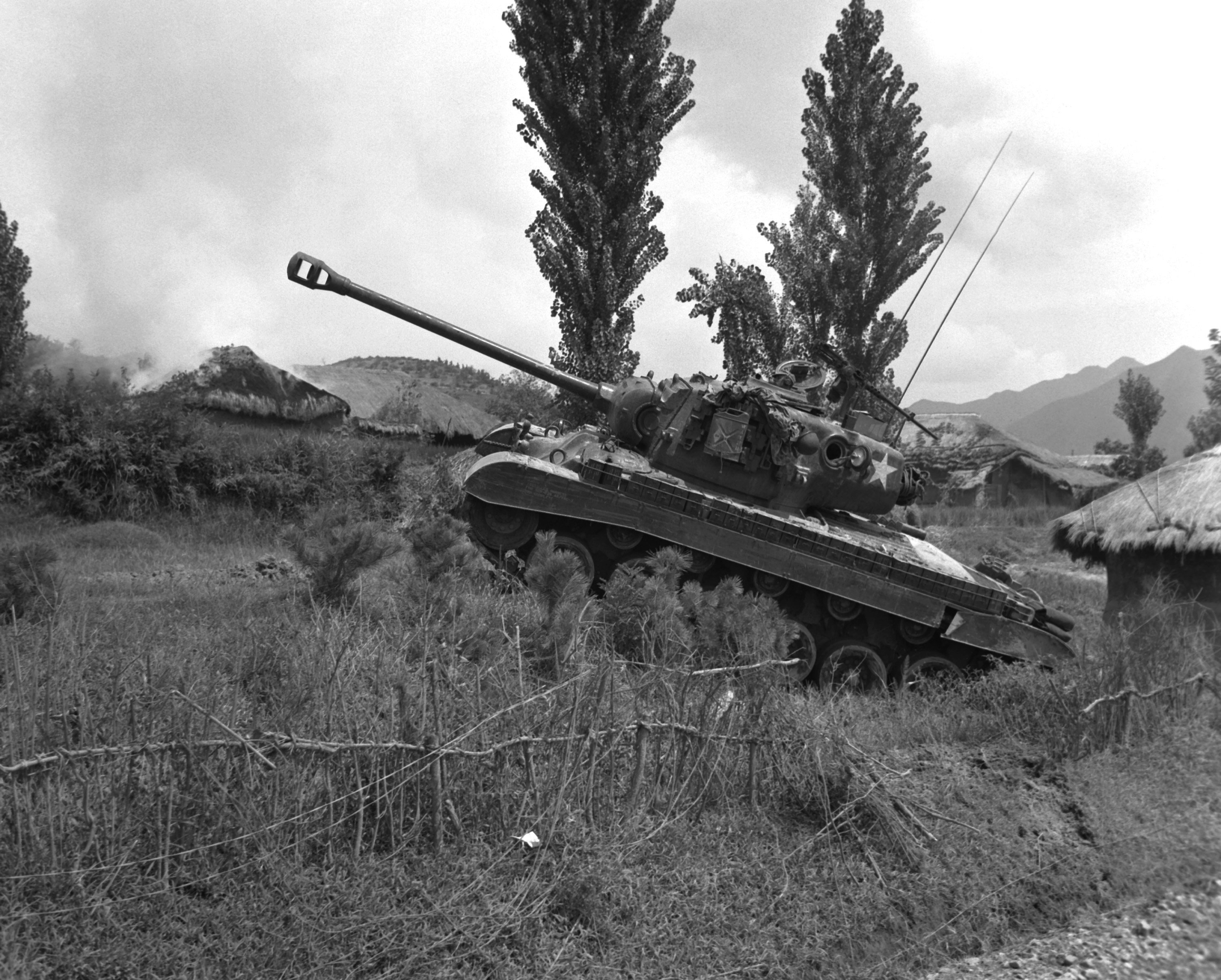
Marine Pershing tanks around the edge of burning Korean village.

The M26 Pershing saw service in the Korean War. When the war began in June 1950, the four American infantry divisions on occupation duty in Japan had no medium tanks, only light tanks. When these divisions were sent to Korea in June 1950, they found that the 75 mm gun on their light tanks could not penetrate the armor of North Korean T-34 tanks, whose 85 mm guns had no difficulty piercing the American tanks' thin armor. In a Tokyo ordnance depot, three Pershing tanks were discovered in poor condition; they were hastily rebuilt with improvised parts. These Pershings were formed into a provisional tank platoon and sent to Korea in July; used to defend the town of Chinju, the tanks soon lost mobility and were destroyed when the improvised parts failed, meaning that the only three American medium tanks in Korea were lost.

More medium tanks began arriving in Korea at the end of July 1950. Although no armored divisions were sent because the initial response from battlefield commanders was that Korea was not suitable for tanks, six Army infantry divisions and one Marine division were deployed. Each Army infantry division had one divisional tank battalion of 69 tanks, and each Army infantry regiment had a company of 22 tanks; the Marine division had a tank battalion of 70 gun tanks and nine combination flamethrower-howitzer tanks, and each Marine infantry regiment had an anti-tank platoon with five tanks each.

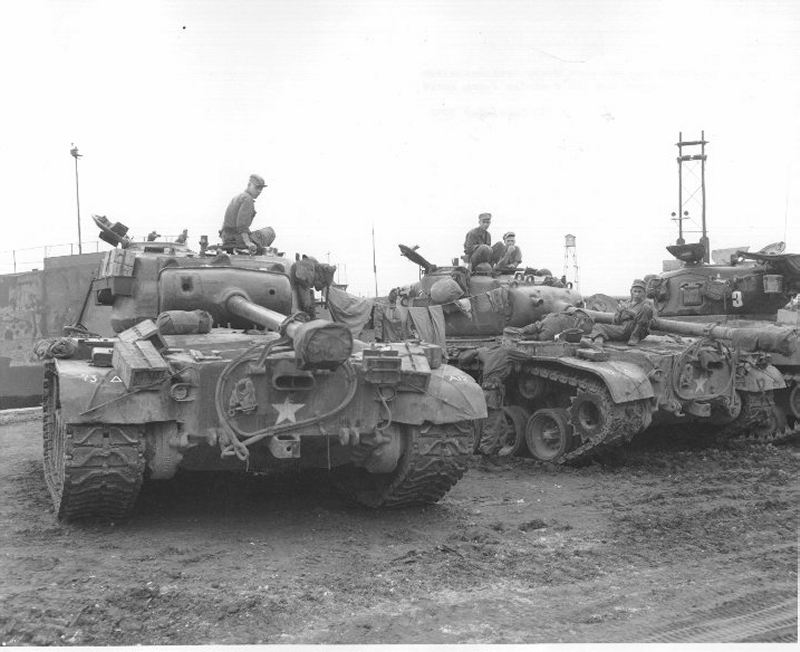
Pershing and Sherman tanks of the 73rd Heavy Tank Battalion at the Pusan Docks, Korea.

While tables of organization and equipment mandated that all tank platoon vehicles be Pershings, with howitzer tanks in company headquarters and light tanks in reconnaissance units only, some units had a shortfall that had to be filled with other tanks. The 70th Tank Battalion at Fort Knox, Kentucky, had pulled World War II memorial M26s off of pedestals and reconditioned them for use, but had to fill out two companies with M4A3 Shermans; the 72nd Tank Battalion at Fort Lewis, Washington, and the 73rd Tank Battalion at Fort Benning, Georgia, were fully equipped with M26s; the 89th Medium Tank Battalion in Japan constituted three companies of reconditioned M4A3s and one of M26s from various bases in the Pacific. Because of the shortage of M26s, most regimental tank companies had M4 Shermans instead. Two battalions detached from the 2nd Armored Division at Fort Hood, Texas, the 6th Medium and 64th Heavy Tank Battalions, were fully equipped with M46 Patton tanks. The 1st Marine Division at Camp Pendleton, California, had all M4 howitzer tanks, which were replaced with M26s just days before boarding ships for Korea. A total of 309 Pershings were rushed to Korea in 1950. The Pershing and its derivative M46 Patton were credited with almost half of the North Korean T-34s destroyed by U.S. tanks.

Being underpowered and unreliable in the mountainous Korean terrain, all M26 Pershings were withdrawn from Korea in 1951 and replaced with M4 Shermans and M46 Pattons.

== Heavy tanks ==
=== M103 heavy tank ===
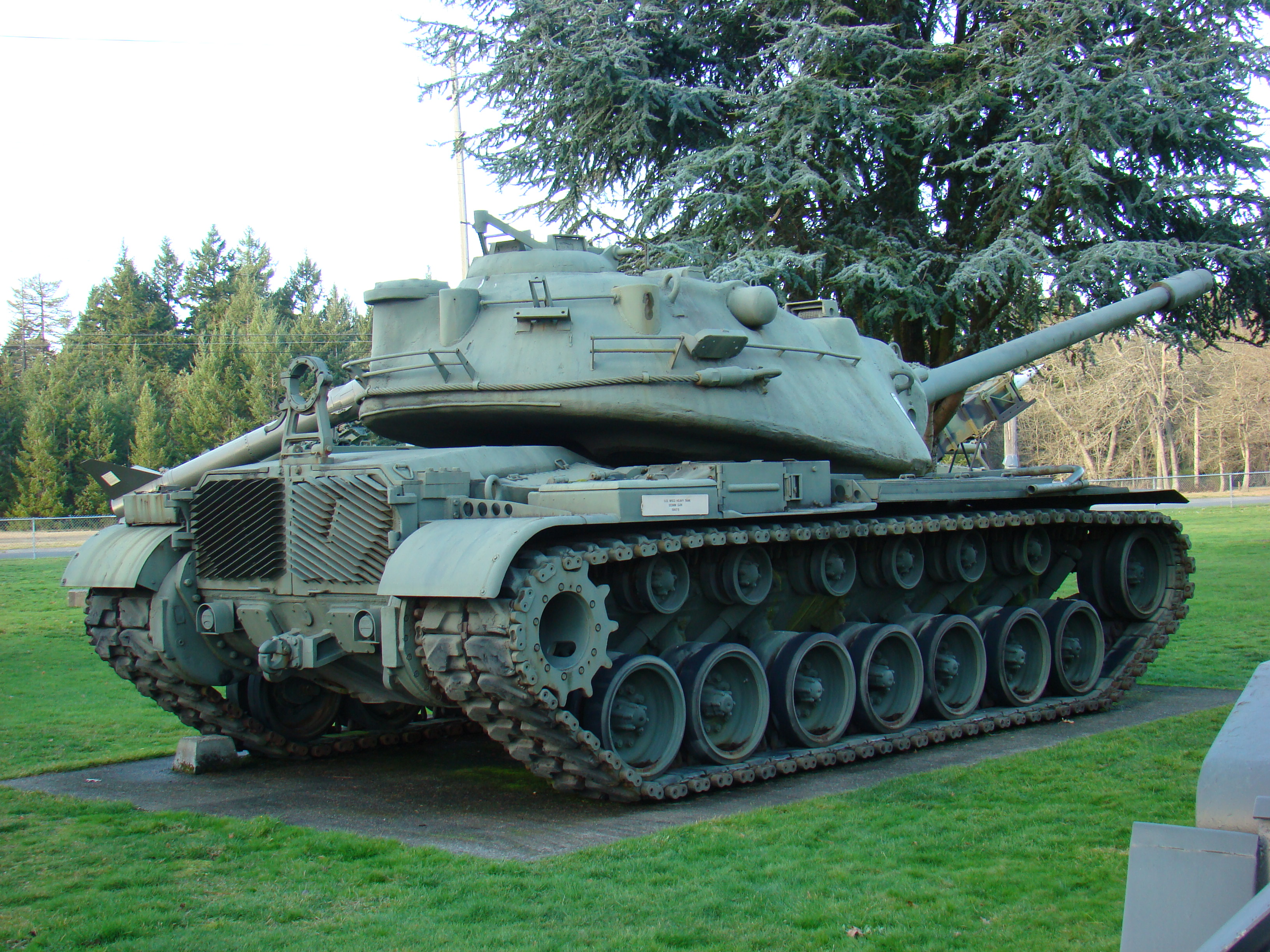
M103 at Ft. Lewis

The M103 was manufactured at the Detroit Arsenal Tank Plant, and the first units were accepted in 1957. The M103 was designed to counter Soviet heavy tanks. Its long-ranged 120 mm cannon was designed to hit enemy tanks at extreme distances, but it was never used in combat. Of the 300 M103s built, most went to the Marines. The tank was relatively underpowered, and the drive systems were fragile.

The turret of the M103 was larger than that of the M48 or the M60 to make room for the huge 120 mm gun and the two loaders assigned to it, in addition to the gunner and the commander. The driver sat in the hull. The gun was capable of elevation from +15 to -8 degrees.

While the U.S. Army deactivated its heavy armor units with the reception of the new M60 series main battle tanks in 1960, the remaining M103s stayed within the U.S. Marine Corps inventory until they began receiving the M60 series MBT. With the disappearance of the heavy tank from U.S. forces came the full acceptance of the main battle tank in 1960 for the Army and 1973 for the Marine Corps.

== Main battle tanks ==
=== M60 ===
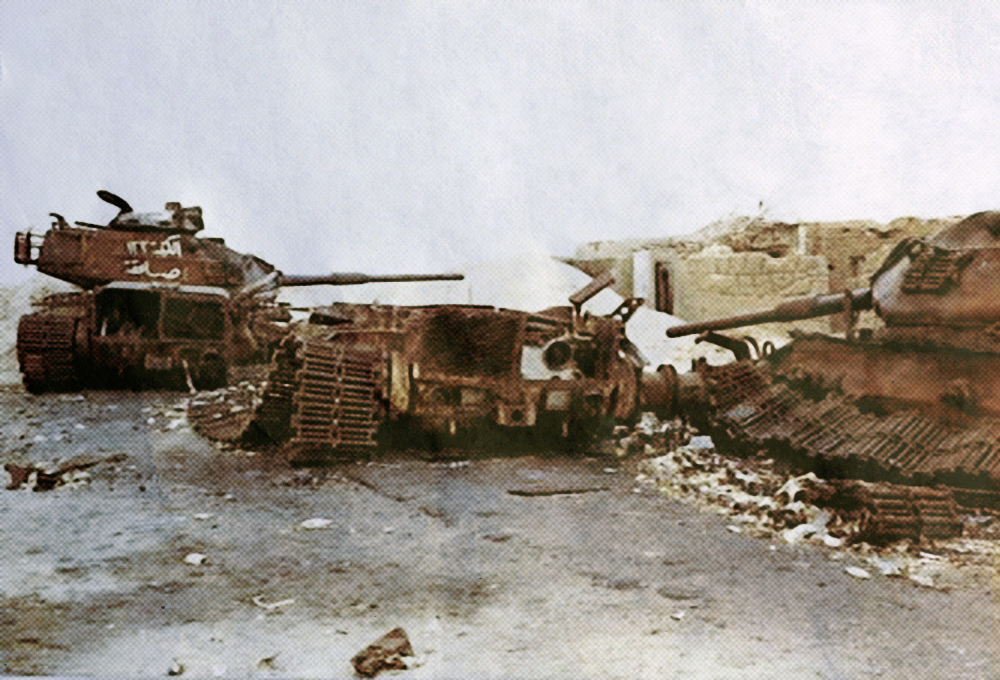
Destroyed Israeli Pattons during Yom Kippur War

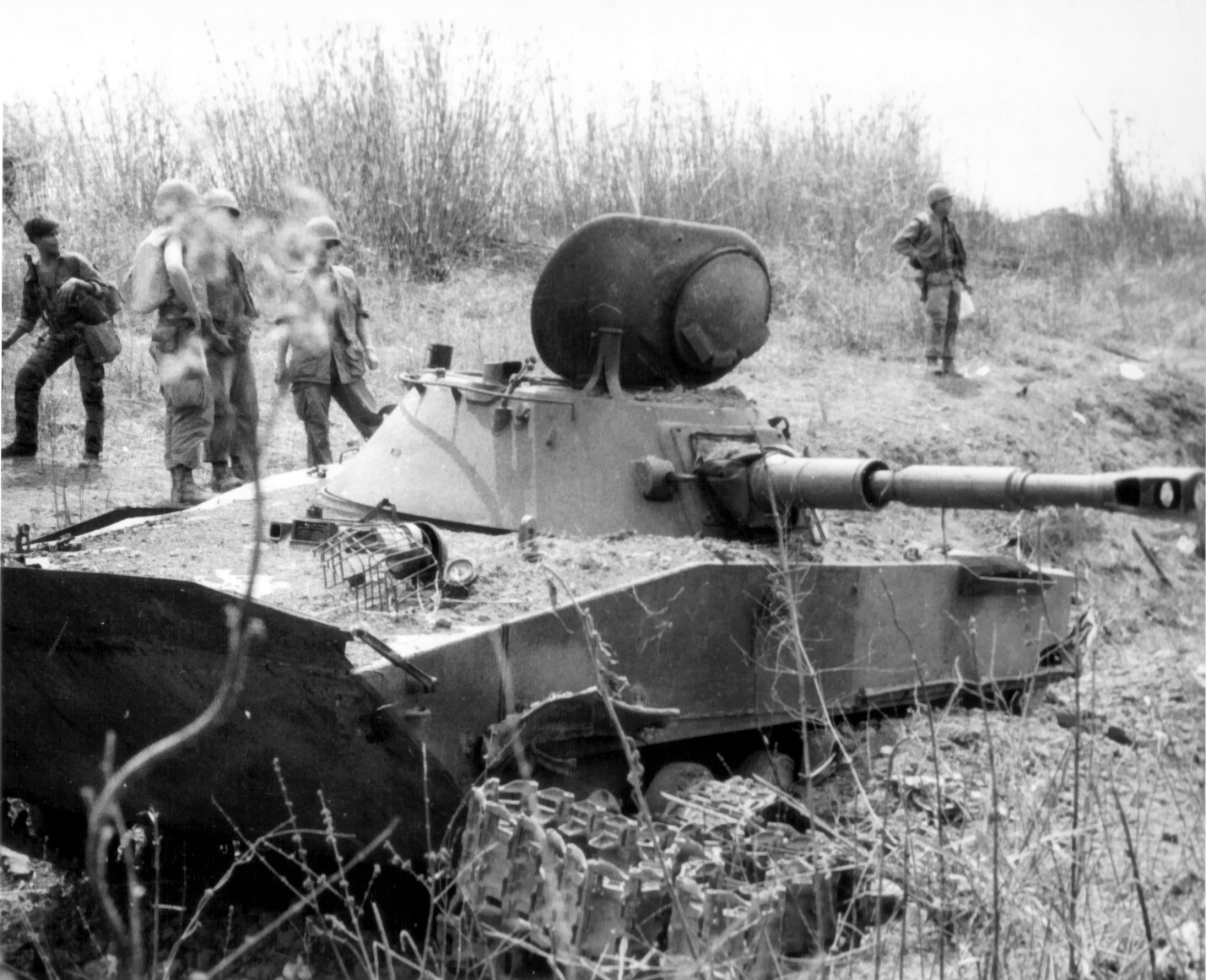
One of two PT-76s from the NVA 202nd Armored Regiment, destroyed by US M48 Pattons, from the 1/69th Armored battalion, during the Battle of Ben Het, March 3, 1969, Vietnam.

The M60 was designed as a replacement for the M48 Patton and is indeed based on the same chassis. The M60 was the last U.S. main battle tank to utilize homogeneous steel armor for protection. It was also the last to feature either the M60 machine gun or an escape hatch under the hull. Originally designated the M68, the new vehicle was put into production in 1959, reclassified as the M60, and entered service in 1960. Over 15,000 M60s (all variants) were constructed.

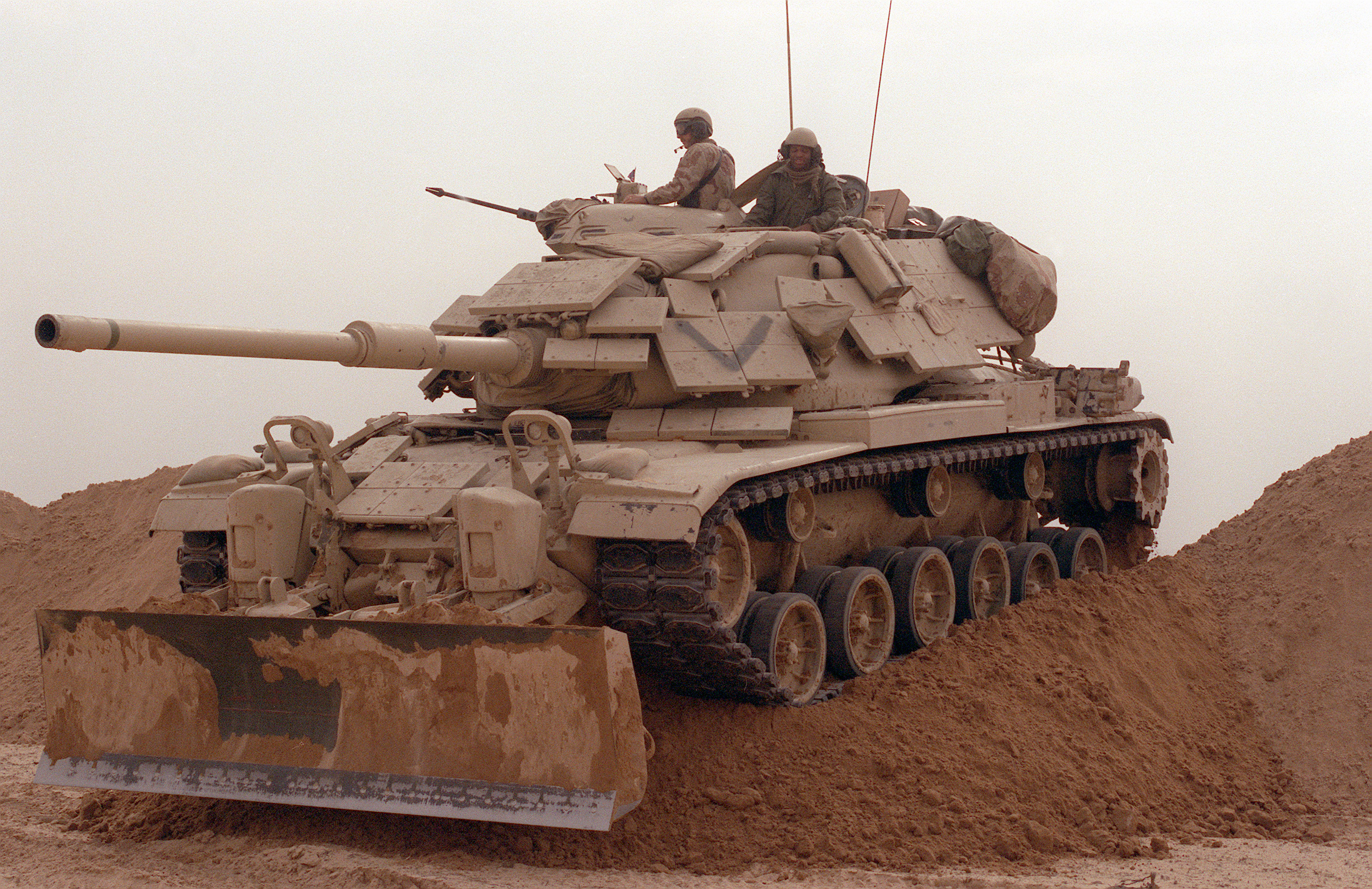
Marines from Company D, 2nd Tank Battalion, drive their M60A1 main battle tank during a breach exercise in Operation Desert Storm in 1991. The tank is fitted with reactive armor and an M-9 bulldozer kit.

In 1963, the M60 was upgraded to the M60A1. This variant, which stayed in production until 1980, featured a larger, better-shaped turret and improvements to the armor protection and shock absorbers. Later versions were equipped with a stabilization system for the main gun and coaxial machine gun, along with Passive night vision sights for gunner, commander, and driver.

The M60A2, nicknamed the "Starship" because of its Space Age technology, featured an entirely new low-profile turret with a commander's machine-gun cupola on top, giving the commander a good view and field of fire while under armor but spoiling the low profile. It also featured a 152 mm cannon, which fired conventional rounds as well as guided missiles. The M60A2 proved a disappointment, though technical advancements would pave the way for future tanks. The Shillelagh/M60A2 system was phased out from active units by 1981 and the turrets scrapped. Most of the M60A2 tanks were rebuilt as M60A3.

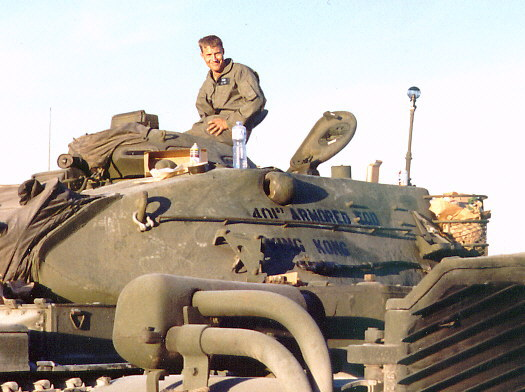
A 401st TFW (P) M60 tank seen at Doha, Qatar during the 1991 Gulf War.

In 1978, work began on the M60A3 variant. It featured a number of technological enhancements, including smoke dischargers, a new rangefinder, and M21 ballistic computer, and a turret stabilization system. Perhaps the most impressive addition to the A3 variant was the Tank Thermal Sight (TTS), which dramatically improved the gunner's night vision enabling the M60A3 to become a greater threat in darkness or inclement weather. In addition it reverted to the 105 mm cannon. All active American M60s eventually underwent the conversion to the A3 model. The M60A3 was phased out of U.S. service in 1997.

=== MBT-70 and XM803 ===
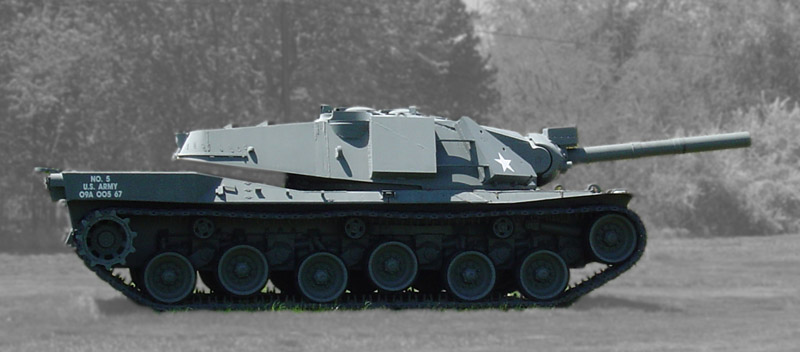
American prototype of the MBT-70.

The MBT-70 was a 1960s joint German–U.S. project to develop a replacement for the M60 Patton using several advanced design features. It used a kneeling suspension, housed the entire crew in the turret, and the American version incorporated a gun-fired missile.

By 1969 the MBT-70 cost five times what was projected, at $1 million a unit ($8.57 million in present-day terms). Germany backed out of the project and restarted development of what would become the Leopard 2. At this point Congress also began objecting to the rapidly increasing price, to which the Army responded by introducing a lower-cost system based on the same design, known as the XM803. This succeeded only in producing an expensive system with capabilities similar to the M60 it was supposed to replace.

=== M1 Abrams ===
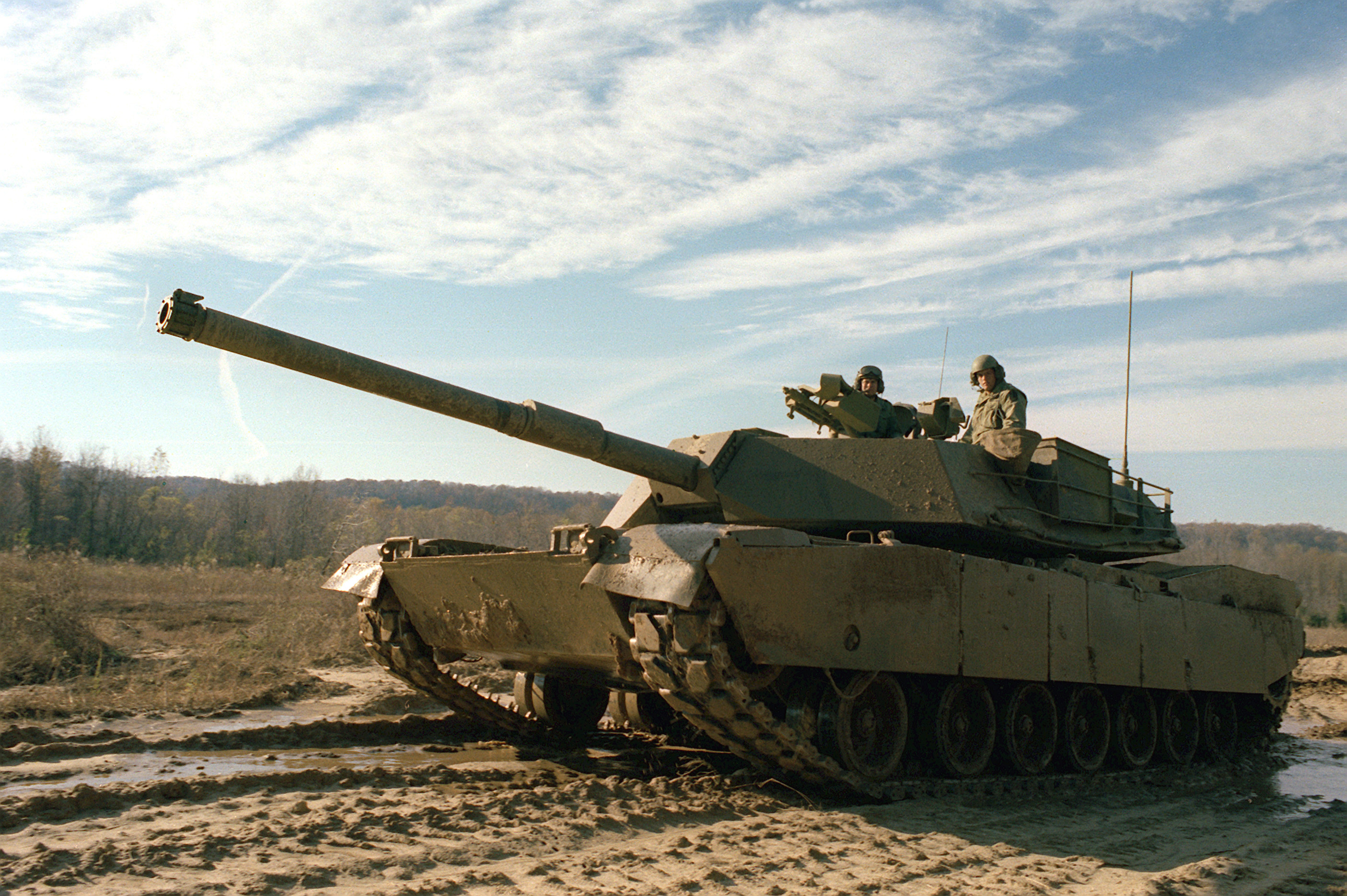
An XM1 Abrams, during a demonstration at Fort Knox, Kentucky in 1979.

Congress redistributed funds from the MBT-70 and XM803 to the XM1. Prototypes were delivered in 1976 by Chrysler Defense and General Motors armed with a 105 mm rifled cannon. The Chrysler Defense design was selected for development as the M1. In 1979, General Dynamics Land Systems Division purchased Chrysler Defense.

The M1 Abrams was the first of its kind. It featured a low profile turret, and for the first time ever on a tank, composite chobham armor. Despite all these advances, the Abrams still retained the 4-man crew of the M60 Patton as the autoloader was considered unproven and risky. Over 3200 M1 Abrams were produced and first entered U.S. Army service in 1980.

About 6,000 M1A1 Abrams were produced and used a 120 mm smoothbore cannon, improved armor, and a CBRN protection system. As the Abrams entered service in the 1980s, they would operate alongside M60A3 Patton. These exercises usually took place in Western Europe, especially West Germany, but also in some other countries like South Korea. During such training, Abrams crews honed their skills for use against the Soviet Union. However, by 1991 the USSR had collapsed, and the Abrams would have its trial by fire in the Middle East during the Gulf War.

== See also ==
- History of the tank
- Tanks in World War I
- List of interwar armoured fighting vehicles
- Tanks in World War II
- Tanks of the U.S. in the World Wars
- American armored fighting vehicle production during World War II
