= List of named tanks =

Throughout the history of armored warfare, tankers have been known to give nicknames to their tanks. This is a list of named tanks.

== Canada ==
Churchill Oke

- Bull
- Beetle

M4A2 Sherman

- Bomb
- Caribou
- Holy Roller

M4(105)

- Cougar

== People's Republic of China ==
Type 97 ShinHōtō Chi-Ha medium tank

- Gongchen tank

== Finland ==
Renault FT

- Koiras
- Naaras

T-50 tank

- Niki

KV-1

- Klimi

== France ==
Char B1

- Rhin (Formerly Flandres)
- Rhône

Char B1 Bis

- Eure

Char 2C

- Poitou
- Provence
- Picardie
- Alsace
- Bretagne
- Touraine
- Anjou
- Normandie (Later renamed Lorraine)
- Berry
- Champagne

== German Empire ==
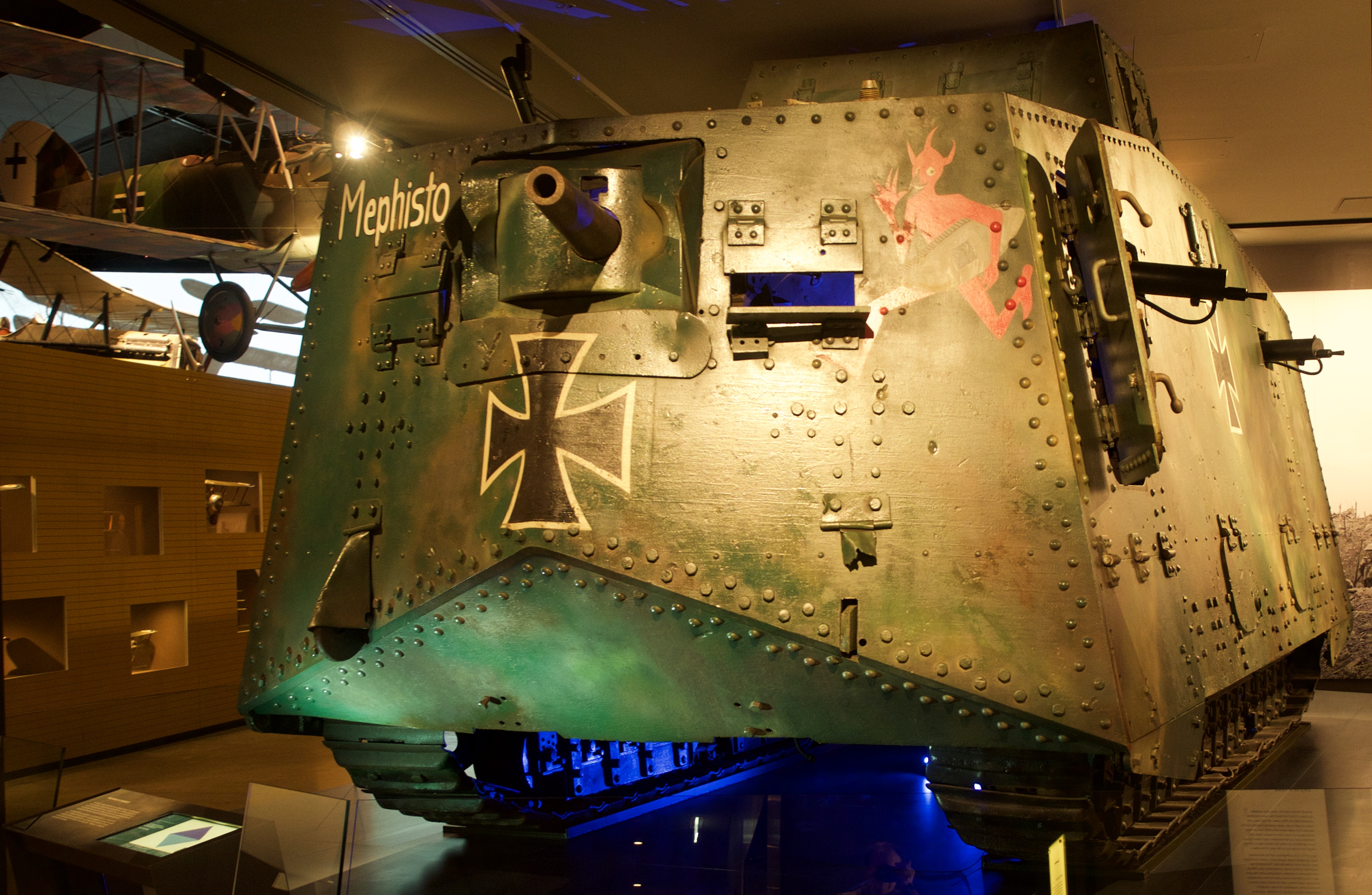
Mephisto on display in Australia

A7V

- Mephisto
- Gretchen
- Faust
- Schnuck
- Baden I
- Cyklop (later renamed Imperator)
- Siegfried
- Alter Fritz
- Lotti
- Hagen
- Nixe
- Nixe II
- Heiland
- Elfriede
- Bulle (later renamed Adalbert)
- Herkules
- Wotan
- Prinz Oskar

== Nazi Germany ==
Tiger I

- Tiger Eagle

== Greece ==
L3/33

- Avenger of Ellie

== Russia ==
T-80BV

- Alyosha

T-72B3 obr.2022

- Tsar

== Soviet Union ==
T-34

- Fighting Girlfriend

== Spain ==
Renault FT

- INFANTERIA Nº10

== United Kingdom ==
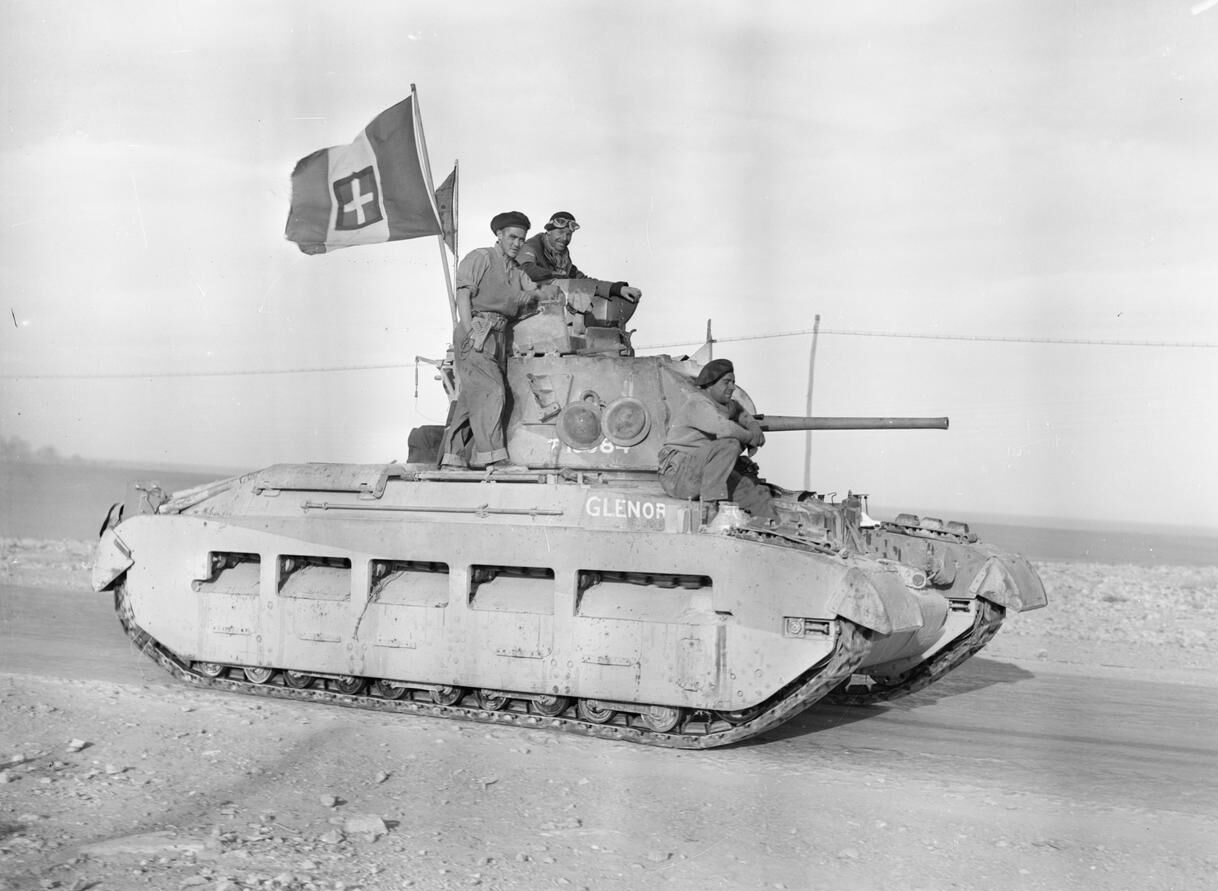
A British Matilda Mk II named "Glenorchy" of Major K.P. Harris, MC, commander of 'D' Squadron, 7th Royal Tank Regiment during Operation Compass displaying an Italian flag captured at Tobruk, 24 January 1941

Mark IV tank

- Black Bess
- Britannia
- Fray Bentos

Matilda II

- Glenorchy

Sexton MK.II

- Culloden
- Exterminator
- Vindictive

== United States of America ==
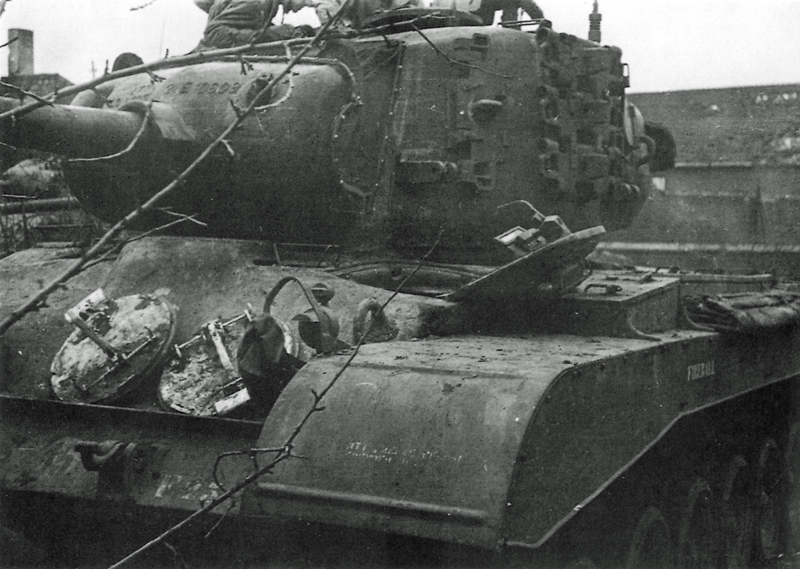
T26E3 nicknamed Fireball, knocked out by a Tiger I in an ambush.

M4 Sherman

- Cobra King

M4A1(76)W

- IN THE MOOD

M26 Pershing

- Eagle 7
- Fireball

M48 Patton

- The Grim Reaper
