= 130 mm air defense gun KS-30 =

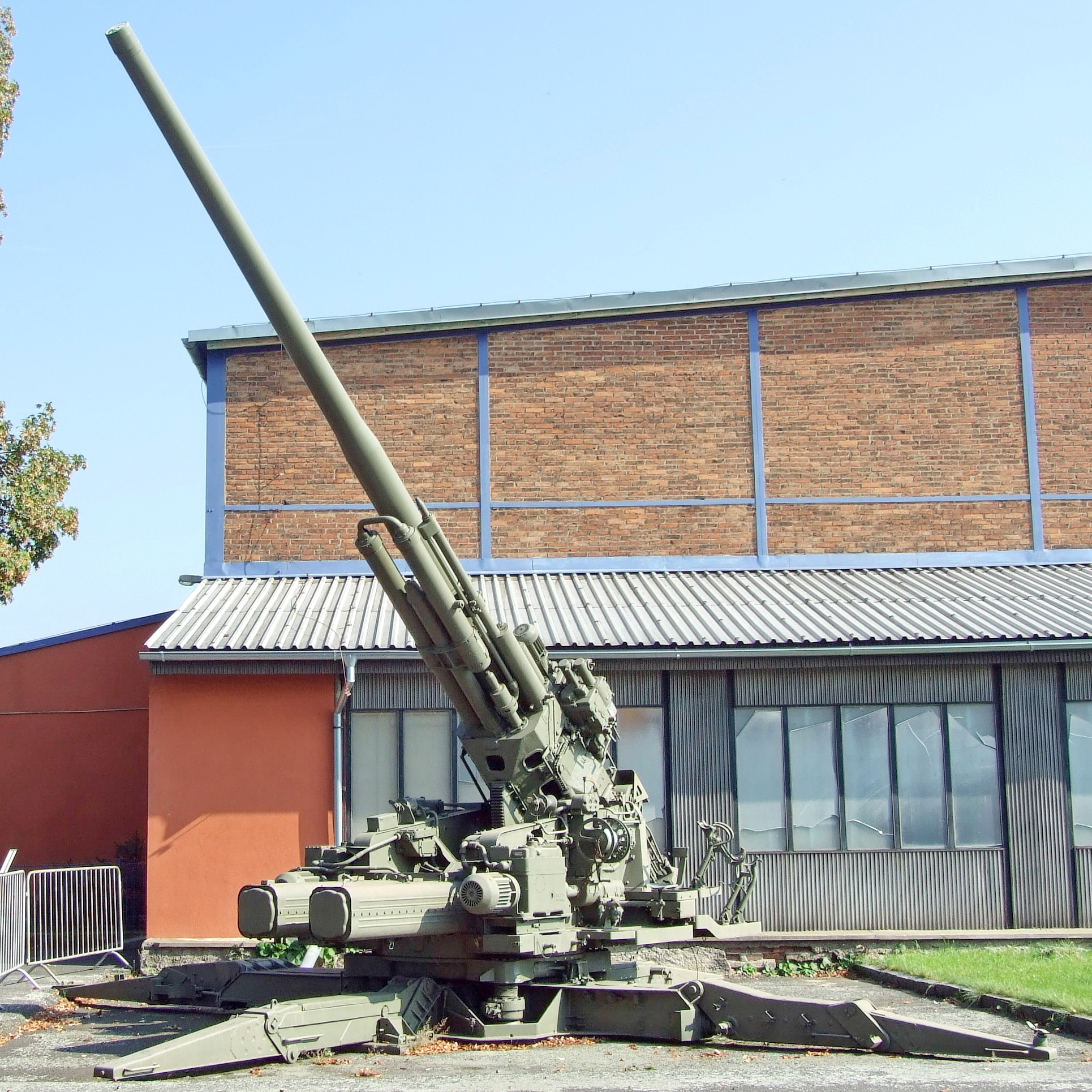
- Type: Anti-aircraft gun
- Place of origin: Soviet Union

Service history
- In service: 1955–1962 (Soviet Union)
- Used by: See users
- Wars: Vietnam War; Iran–Iraq War; Gulf War; 2003 invasion of Iraq

Production history
- Designer: M. N. Loginov
- Designed: 1946–1954

Specifications
- Mass: 24,900 kg (54,900 lb) (combat); 29,500 kg (65,000 lb) (traveling)
- Length: 11.5 m (37 ft 9 in) (traveling)
- Barrel length: 8.4 m (27 ft 7 in)
- Width: 3 m (9.8 ft) (traveling)
- Height: 3 m (9.8 ft) (traveling)
- Crew: 15–20 (Note: According to Cullen and Foss. While Isby gives a figure of 11 men.)
- Shell: High-explosive fragmentation (HE-FRAG); Armour-piercing high explosive (APHE)
- Caliber: 130 mm (5.1 in)
- Breech: Semi-automatic horizontal sliding-wedge
- Recoil: Hydraulic
- Elevation: −5°/+80
- Traverse: 360°
- Rate of fire: 10–12 rpm
- Muzzle velocity: 970 m/s (3,200 ft/s)
- Effective firing range: 16.5 km (10.3 mi)
- Maximum firing range: 29 km (18 mi) (horizontal); 22 km (14 mi) (vertical)

The KS-30 is a Soviet 130 mm (5.1 in) L/65 caliber anti-aircraft gun first introduced into Soviet service in 1955. An interim design intended to provide medium-altitude air defense of strategic infrastructure, it was used until 1960−1962, when they were phased out in favor of surface-to-air missiles, but several were retained in strategic reserve as late as of 1988.

The gun saw service in the Vietnam War, Iran–Iraq War, and Gulf War, remaining in service in Iraq and Vietnam as late as 2002.

== Development ==
Development of the 130 mm KS-30 began in 1946 at the Zavod no. 9 at Kalinin under a team led by M. N. Loginov. While the gun provided a 25% increase in effective ceiling over the KS-19 100 mm anti-aircraft gun, development was slow since the Soviets were focused on the development of surface-to-air missiles. After it became clear that it would take time to develop and deploy an effective SAM network, work on the KS-30 gun and associated fire control systems resumed as a stopgap measure.

The Soviets greatly benefited from captured German operational and technical expertise following the end of World War II, as well from American and British technologies, with the KS-30 making use of radar and fire control systems copied from United States-supplied Lend-Lease equipment and automatic rammers taken from the British QF 3.7-inch AA gun.

According to Cullen and Foss, the KS-30 was equivalent of the American 120 mm gun M1 and may have been based on a 130 mm naval gun.

== Design ==
Like other Soviet field artillery pieces, the KS-30 was a simple and rugged design, using a hydraulic recoil system and fixed-charge separate-loading ammunition. The weapon also benefited from the use of adapted Western technologies.

The KS-30 used a 130 mm (5.1 in) L/65 caliber barrel; the gun was carried on a two-axle, eight-wheeled carriage. When readied for firing, the axles were removed and the carriage was folded into a firing platform. It was towed either by a AT-T tracked artillery tractor or a Ural-375 6×6 truck. While the carriage had in-built fire-control systems, the gun was usually used in conjunction with the PUAZO director and the SON-9 (NATO reporting name: "Fire Can") fire-control radar which was derived from the US-made SCR-584 radar, supplied under Lend-Lease.

It was a medium-altitude weapon. The fire control radars had difficulty acquiring targets flying low and the gun weight and bulk made tracking fast moving aircraft difficult. At high-altitudes, accuracy suffered from increased shell dispersion. Like other Soviet large caliber anti-aircraft guns, the KS-30 could also be used against ground targets.

== Ammunition ==
Ammunition used were of the fixed-charge, separate-loading type that was not interchangeable with the 130 mm towed field gun M1954 (M-46) or the 130 mm gun SM-4-1 coastal gun. It could fire high-explosive fragmentation (HE-FRAG) or armour-piercing high explosive (APHE) rounds.

Type	Weight		Muzzle velocity		Penetration at 0°	
Source:	Isby	Cullen & Foss	Isby	Cullen & Foss	Isby	Cullen & Foss
HE-FRAG	22.4 kg (49 lb)	33.4 kg (74 lb)	950 m/s (3,100 ft/s)	970 m/s (3,200 ft/s)	N/A	N/A
APHE	N/A	33.4 kg (74 lb)	N/A	970 m/s (3,200 ft/s)	N/A	250 mm (9.8 in) (Note: Against rolled homogeneous armor at a range of 1,000 m (3,300 ft).)

== History ==
The KS-30 was introduced in the Soviet Army and Soviet Air Defence Forces service in 1955. It was intended to provide medium-alititude protection high-priority targets such as bridges, factories, transportation hubs, and cities. Large caliber anti-aircraft guns were widely used until 1960–1962, when they were phased out in favor of surface-to-air missiles, but several were retained in strategic reserve as late as 1988, presumably to be deployed by anti-aircraft units after their stockpile of missiles were exhausted in a prolonged conflict. These guns were to be accompanied by a cadre of gun-trained reserve officers.

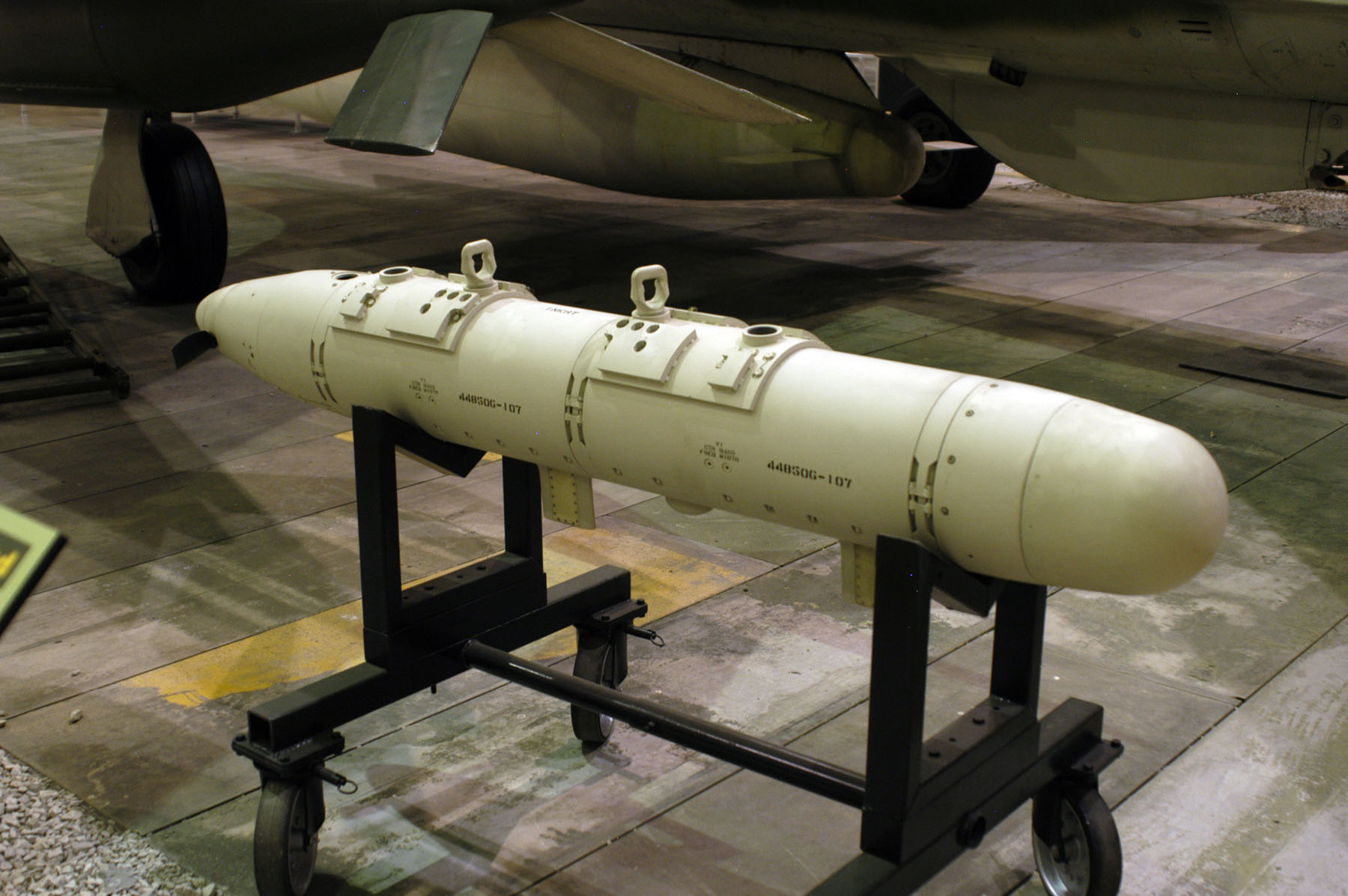
The ALQ-71 ECM pod was effective against the KS-30 radars

North Vietnam also used a small number of guns during the Vietnam War. During the conflict, the fire-control radars of Soviet-made AA guns were constantly jammed by American chaffs and the ALQ-71/72 electronic countermeasure pods, which contributed in making the guns effectively obsolete.

The gun was also used by Iraq during the Iran–Iraq War. Prior to the Gulf War in 1991, it was estimated that Iraq had 200 guns in service. An unknown number of guns survived the conflict and would remain in service with the Iraqi Army until the 2003 invasion of Iraq.

== Operators ==
=== Former Operators ===
- Iraq
- Soviet Union
- Vietnam − Remained in service as late as of 2002

== Comparable weapons ==
- 12.8 cm FlaK 40 – Nazi Germany
- 120 mm M1 gun – United States

== See also ==
- 100 mm air defense gun KS-19 – contemporary and complementary weapons system
- 85 mm air defense gun M1939 (52-K) – previous generation Soviet AA-gun, much more known
- 152 mm air defense gun KM-52 – 152 mm anti-aircraft gun developed from the KS-30
