= 152 mm air defense gun KM-52 =

Soviet anti-aircraft weapon

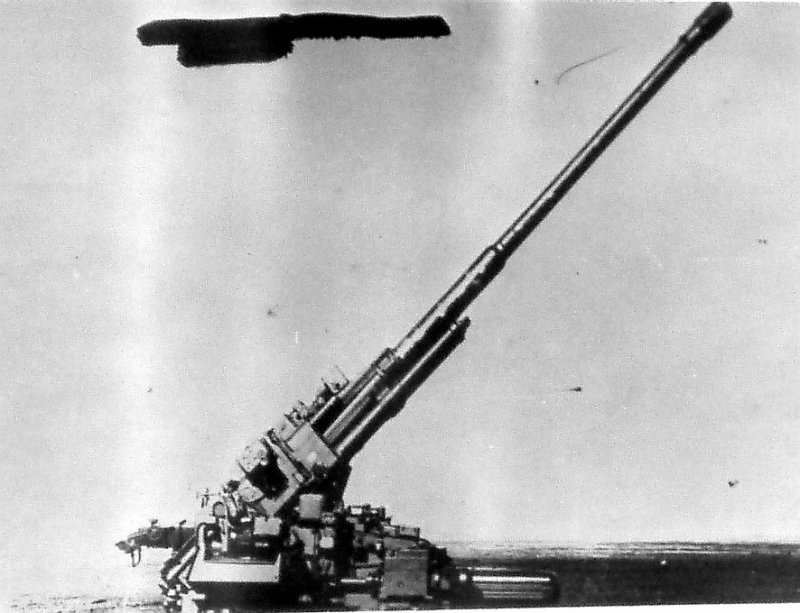
- Place of origin: USSR

Production history
- No. built: 16

Specifications
- Mass: 33,500 kg (73,855 lb)
- Caliber: 152.4 mm (6.0 in)
- Traverse: 360°
- Rate of fire: 16-17 RPM

The 152 mm air defense gun KM-52 is a type of experimental anti-aircraft artillery developed by the Experimental Design Bureau (now independent as NPO Novator) of Plant No.8.

Originally developed as the 152 mm air defense gun KS-52 in 1949, the gun had a muzzle velocity of 1030 m/s, firing a 49 kg shell at 10 rounds per minute with a travel weight of 46 tons. After inspection by the Soviet Artillery Committee (the Artkom) and the Ministry of Armaments, work on the KS-52 was halted in 1949.

Resolution No. 2966-1727 of November 26, 1951 from the Council of Ministers approved development of a "152 mm air defense gun on the basis of the KS-30", which was entrusted to OKB-8 and the Design Bureau of Plant No.172. Its head designer was Tsyrulnikov. The new gun, carrying the designation KM-52, was not fully developed until 1954. The Technical Council of the Ministry of Defense Industry inspected the gun on January 28–29, 1955.

Production work of the KM-52 and its shells were distributed to different factories; the gun itself was mainly assigned to Plant No.172 (now Motovilikha Plants), who received different gun parts from other plants, including barrels from Plant No.232 (now Obukhov State Plant), which were in turn made from technical drawings by Plant No.8, GSP-152 traverse mechanisms from TsNII-173 (headed by Monastyrsky). Plant No.710 (now the defunct Podolsk Electro-Mechanical Plant). Shells were developed in NII-24, built by Plant No.73 with casings developed by NII-147. Firing mechanisms were developed from that of the SM-27 gun.

Plant No.221 (now Titan-Barrikady) also prepared two barrels and sent them to Plant No.172 in 1955. The KM-52 underwent factory testing in December 1955, and was delivered on December 28. The KM-52's gun carriage did not differ greatly from that of the KS-30. It achieved a rate of fire of 16-17 rounds per minute and 16 units were accepted into service in 1957.

Controlled experiments with the gun in 1957 produced some results, but a resolution adopted by the Council of Ministers in June 1958 halted development of rocket-assisted projectiles for the KM-52 alongside all work on the gun.

== See also ==
- 100 mm air defense gun KS-19 – contemporary and complementary weapons system
- 85 mm air defense gun M1939 (52-K) – previous generation Soviet AA-gun, much more known
- 130 mm air defense gun KS-30 – 130 mm anti-aircraft gun from which the KM-52 was developed
- 120 mm gun M1 – standard super-heavy anti-aircraft gun for the US Army
