= T34 heavy tank =

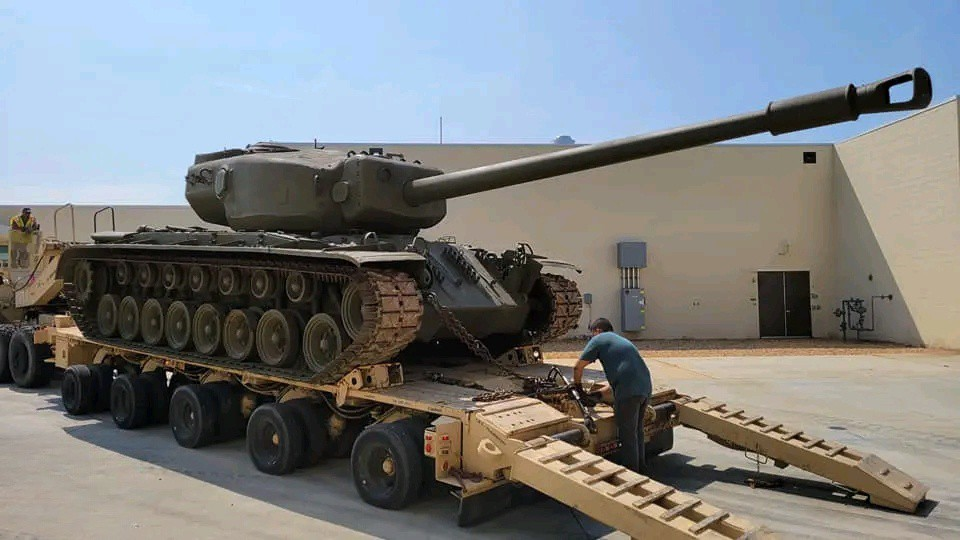
- The T34 heavy tank in the U.S. Army Armor & Cavalry Collection, 2021
- Type: Heavy tank
- Place of origin: United States

Service history
- In service: Trials only
- Used by: United States Army

Production history
- Designed: 1945-1948
- No. built: 2 prototypes

Specifications
- Mass: 158,512 lb (71.900 t) combat loaded
- Length: 37.5 ft (11.4 m) gun forward 25 ft (7.6 m) gun aft
- Width: 12.46 ft (3.80 m) over sand shields
- Height: 10.49 ft (3.20 m) over cupola
- Crew: 6 (driver, gunner, loader, assistant loader, commander, assistant driver)
- Armor: Hull front: 102 mm (4.0 in) at 54°(228 mm (9.0 in) effective); Hull side: 76 mm (3.0 in); Hull rear: 51 mm (2.0 in); Turret front 203–305 mm (8.0–12.0 in); Turret side: 158 mm (6.2 in); Turret rear: 204 mm (8.0 in)
- Main armament: 120 mm T53 L/60 rifled gun (34 rounds)
- Secondary armament: 3 x .50 in (12.7mm) M2HB AA (1,500 rounds), 2 × coaxial & 1 × pintle-mounted 1 x .30 in (7.6 mm) Browning M1919A4, bow (2,500 rounds)
- Engine: 1,649 cu in (27.02 L) Continental AV-1790-5A air-cooled 810 hp (600 kW) net at 2800 rpm
- Power/weight: 11.26 hp/t (8.40 kW/t)
- Transmission: General Motors CD-850-1 crossdrive, three speeds (two forward, one reverse)
- Suspension: torsion-bar
- Fuel capacity: 350 US gal (1,300 L; 290 imp gal)
- Maximum speed: 26 mph (42 km/h) (on road); 23 mph (37 km/h) (off-road)

The T34 heavy tank was an American design for a heavy tank. It evolved from the T29 heavy tank and T30 heavy tank in 1945, using the same chassis, but sporting a modified 120 mm gun M1 anti-aircraft gun. Extra armor plating was applied to the rear of the turret bustle as a counterweight for the heavier 120 mm T53 main gun. No production orders were placed for the T34, which was deemed to be too heavy.

== History ==
=== Intermediate caliber ===
An interesting trend can be observed in American tank and SPG development. Starting with the Medium Tank M3, many of the best and most popular American tank guns were based on AA guns. Of course, other nations often put the ballistics of an AA gun to work in a tank, but the Americans did this most often. The same thing ended up happening to the armament of heavy tanks. Several towed AA guns were used by the American military. The most powerful of them all was the 120 mm M1. Work on it lasted for 20 years and it saw very little use in battle. Nevertheless, its appearance in 1944 was not overlooked by the Ordnance Department. The gun had exceptional characteristics, surpassing its closest analogue, the 128 mm Flak 40, in muzzle velocity, while having a shorter barrel.

=== Prototypes ===
120mm gun T53

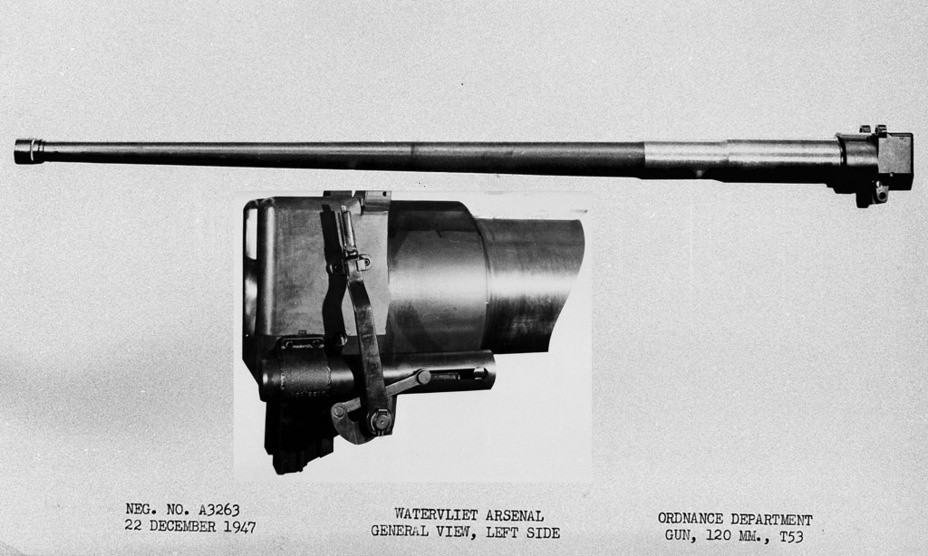
The 120 mm T53 gun used in the Heavy Tank T34

The idea to build a tank gun from the 120 mm M1 did not come immediately. Initially, design work focused on longer 90 mm guns and new 105 and 155 mm guns. It was clear by early 1945 that this development was not going as planned. A study of the effectiveness of tank weapons showed that the 120 mm AA gun was an ideal candidate. The gun was long, 7391 mm without a muzzle brake, but the T15E2 gun used on the Heavy Tank T32 was only 10 inches shorter. Even the 105 mm gun T5 was not much shorter, only by 13 inches. The high muzzle velocity, and therefore high penetration, was worth it. The projectile was also comparatively heavy. The characteristics of the 120 mm tank gun were similar to those of the Soviet OBM-51 gun, later renamed BL-13. The difference was that the Americans actually finished their gun.

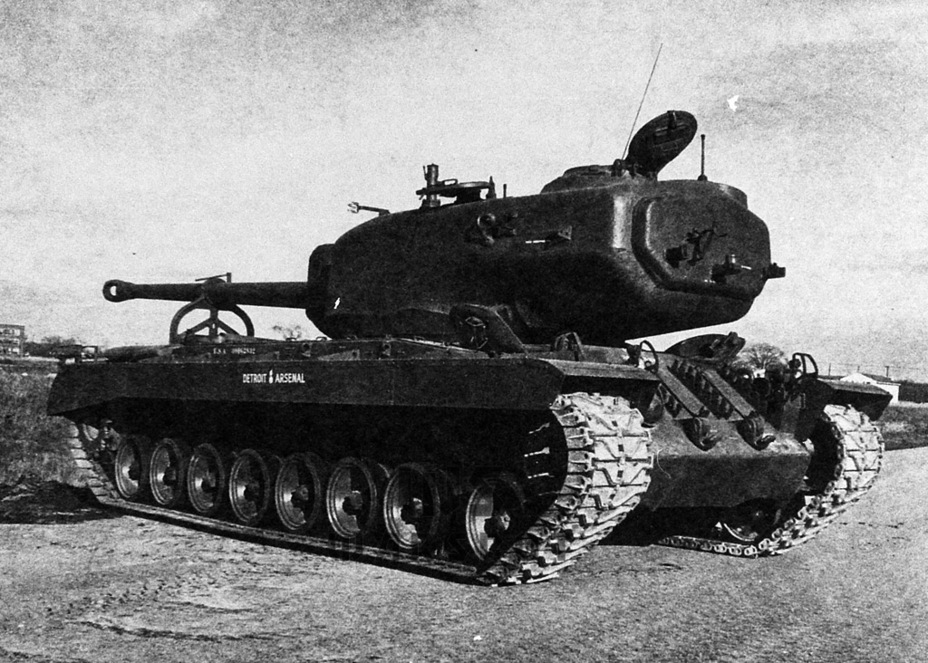
T34 prototype at the Aberdeen Proving Grounds, 1948

The turret was also the same initially. However, changes were introduced at the very beginning of development. The T53 gun was not only longer, but half a ton heavier than the T5E1. As a result, the balance of the turret shifted. A 102 mm thick plate had to be welded onto the back of the turret as a counterweight. The tank's gun mount received the index T125, even though it was identical to that of the T123 on the Heavy Tank T29. Like the T29, this tank had two coaxial machine guns.

Like the T29 and T30, the Heavy Tank T34 was built at the Detroit Tank Arsenal. However, work was not urgent, and these vehicles are only mentioned in the documents of the Aberdeen Proving Grounds starting with April 1948. According to plans, tank #2 and registration number USA 30162833 was going to be sent for trials. The other tank remained in Detroit as a test lab. The final tank weighed 65,136 kg, more than the T29 but less than the T30. As further trials showed, its mobility was analogous to that of the T30.

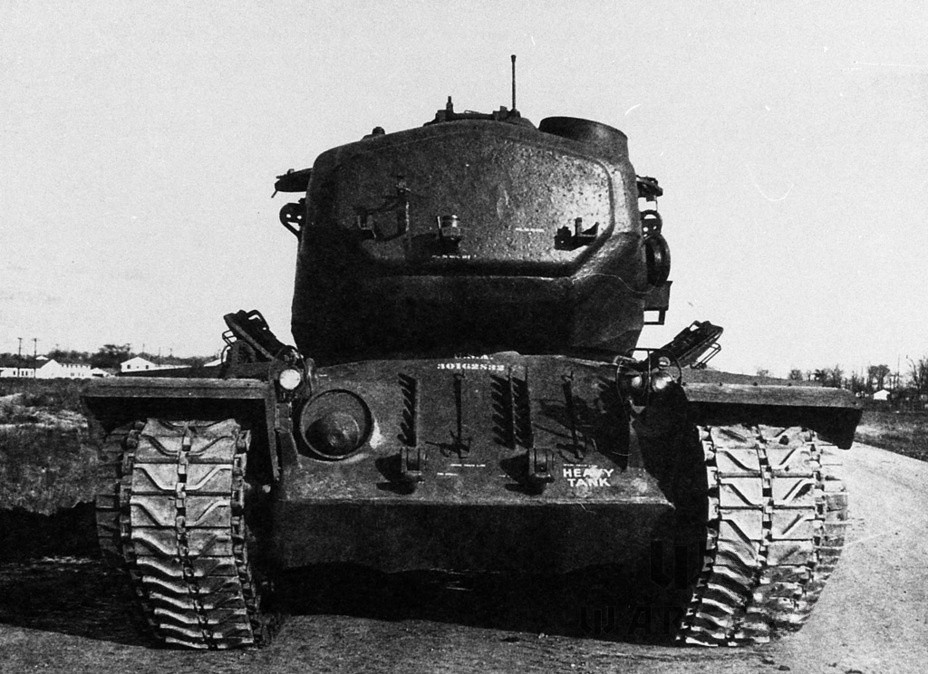
T34 Heavy Tank number USA 30162832 remained at the Detroit Tank Arsenal

The Heavy Tank T34 did not remain in Aberdeen for long. On August 18th, 1948, it was sent to Fort Knox. Considering that the tank only arrived on July 27th, it drove for only 80 km. Firing trials were also performed. The tank returned to Aberdeen in December of 1948 with the same number on its odometer, meaning that the tank was not used at all. Only 136 km was driven by mid-1949. These negligible numbers were due to the bulk of the effort being spent on the Heavy Tank T30. The T34 was mainly built to test the gun.

The major changes made to both Heavy Tanks T34 were linked to gunnery trials. Due to the bulky ammunition, the ammunition capacity was the same as the Heavy Tank T30, being 34 rounds. On the other hand, the lighter ammunition made loading the gun faster, especially with two loaders. The maximum rate of fire was 5 RPM, impressive for such a caliber.

The gunnery trials were much more important. The gun penetrated a 198 mm thick plate at 30 degrees from 1000 yards. This meant that the T34 could penetrate the side armour of the Maus from medium distances, and at close range could even penetrate the front. A HVAP shot was also available, with a penetration of 381 mm at 1000 yards and 318 mm at 2000. This meant that the gun was powerful enough to defeat any German tank, even prospective ones. However, the penetration dropped drastically if the angle of the plate was increased: at 60 degrees the AP shell penetrated 102 mm and the HVAP shell 112 mm.

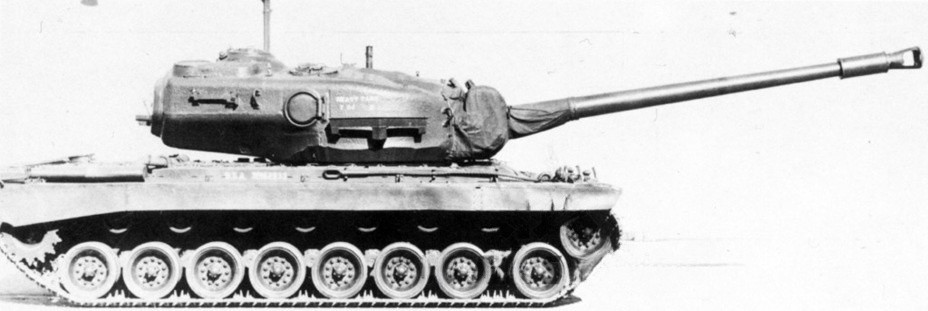
The second prototype also received a fume extractor. It survives to this day.

The biggest problem encountered during firing was the amount of fumes that collected in the turret. Gunnery trials at Fort Knox ended up with the loaders hospitalized, and the Aberdeen Proving Grounds had similar issues. Several solutions were tested to resolve this problem, with the most effective method being the installation of a fume extractor on the barrel. The fume extractor also had the benefit of being much simpler than the more complex solution of locking the breech and clearing it with compressed air that had had limited success in previous trials. Additional trials were performed after the fume extractor was added, which demonstrated and confirmed its effectiveness. Additionally, a new muzzle brake was also tested on the first prototype. Of the two prototypes of the T34, only the second survived. Today it is on display at the National Armor & Cavalry Museum. Even though the T29, T30, and T34 tank family was not put into production, they played an important role in American tank building. Production of the Heavy Tank M103 began in May of 1953. Its design used many innovations derived from the late 1940s testing of these tanks.

== Development ==
In 1945, encounters with German heavy tanks and tank destroyers such as the Tiger II and Jagdtiger led to a new project to create a vehicle that could counter these new threats. The results were the T29, armed with a 105 mm gun, and the T30 armed with a 155 mm gun. Both were built around a lengthened version of the T26E3 chassis, and apart from the different use of guns and engines, they were originally almost identical.

Early in 1942 the Ordnance Department began work on turning the 120mm anti-aircraft gun into a tank gun. It soon became clear that this gun would have better armor piercing abilities than the high velocity 105mm gun of the T29 or the lower velocity 155mm gun of the T30, and in May 1945 the Ordnance Department recommended that two of the T30 pilots be armed with the 120mm gun instead, as the heavy tank T34.

The two pilot models of the T34 were not delivered until 1947, and they went for tests at Fort Knox and the Aberdeen Proving Ground. However, the 120mm gun was found to be problematic due to the powder gases which leaked into the turret. This problem was addressed by the installation of an aspirator type bore evacuator.

Despite solving the problems with the gun, the tank was deemed too heavy for the US Army and the Marine Corps requirements, so no production orders were placed. However, in 1948 a work began on lightened version of the design, the heavy tank T43, which later entered production as the M103 Heavy Tank.

== Survivors ==
There is at least one surviving example on display in the National Armor and Cavalry Museum, Fort Benning, Georgia.

== Bibliography ==
- Hunnicutt, R.P. (March 1, 1988). Firepower: A History of the American Heavy Tank. Presidio Pr. p. 94. ISBN 978-0891413042.
