= T110 heavy tank =

120 mm Gun Tank T110
- Type: Heavy tank
- Place of origin: United States

Service history
- Used by: United States Army (planned)

Production history
- Designer: Chrysler
- Manufacturer: Detroit Arsenal Tank Plant (planned)
- No. built: 1 mockup

Specifications
- Mass: ~50 tons
- Crew: 4 or 5

The 120 mm Gun Tank T110, known during early development as the TS-31, was a canceled heavy tank project which began in 1954. It was an attempt to replace the T43 (M103) heavy tank. The T110 was a proposal created by Detroit Arsenal, and was introduced in a Detroit conference held in 1954. It was further developed by Chrysler.

Development was canceled due to the satisfactory results of the T43 (M103). The tank was planned to be powered by a Continental AVI-1790-8 engine power plant delivering around 875 hp or Continental AOI-1490-1 delivering around 700 hp.

== 1954 Question Mark Conference proposals ==
Beginning in 1952, the first Question Mark conference was held at Detroit Arsenal in Warren, Michigan. The goal of these annual conferences was to facilitate collaboration between tank designers and tank users.

The third conference in 1954 saw proposals to replace the T43E1. Six designs were proposed.

TS-2 was armed with 105 mm T210 smoothbore gun in a rotating turret and equipped with Continental AOI-1490-1 powerplant. TS-5 was armed with 105 mm T210 smoothbore gun in a fixed superstructure and equipped with Continental AOI-1490-1 powerplant. TS-6 was armed with a 120 mm T123E1 rifled gun in a rotating turret and equipped with a Continental AVI-1790-8 powerplant. TS-31 was equipped with a 120 mm T123E1 rifled gun in a fixed superstructure located at the rear of the hull. These four designs were considered short-term prospects, requiring about two years of development. Chrysler was chosen to further develop the TS-31, which was redesignated the T110.

TL-4 and TL-6 were more long-term prospects armed with the smoothbore T210 120 mm guns. Ford Motor Company was awarded a contract for the TL-4, which was redesignated the T96. It was later decided to instead combine the T96 program with the T95 medium tank project, and the T95E4 with the T96 turret was born.

== T110 variants ==
Original design

AV-1790 engine. XTG-500 transmission. T123E1 gun. Gun mounted in a limited traverse gimbal mount.

Design 1

Cab width reduced to fit major rail tunnels. Commander relocated to center rear and driver relocated from hull to cab.

Design 2

Relocated the transmission from the front hull to the engine compartment. Crew arrangement changes in revision 1 reverted. AV-1790 replaced by Continental AOI-1490. Gun traverse was 15 degrees to each side, with 20 degrees of gun elevation and 10 degrees of gun depression.

Design 3

Power pack mounted on rails for ease of maintenance. Aborted due to numerous difficulties this arrangement introduced.

Design 4

Engine and transmission (now XTG-510) moved to rear.

Design 5

The gun was made fully traversable using the turret ring of the M103. One mockup was built. Crew was reduced to 4 by removing one loader and the addition of gun rammer. Program was subsequently terminated as the T43E2 project had proved successful.

== Bibliography ==
- Hunnicutt, Richard Pearce (1988). Firepower: A History of the American Heavy Tank. Novato, California: Presidio Press. ISBN 0-89141-304-9.
