= SON-50 =

SON-50 (NATO reporting name Flap Wheel) is a type of Russian\Soviet fire director radar for 57 mm anti-aircraft guns.

It was widely employed during the Vietnam War.

== See also ==
- SON-9
- SON-30
