= SON-30 =

Russian fire director radar

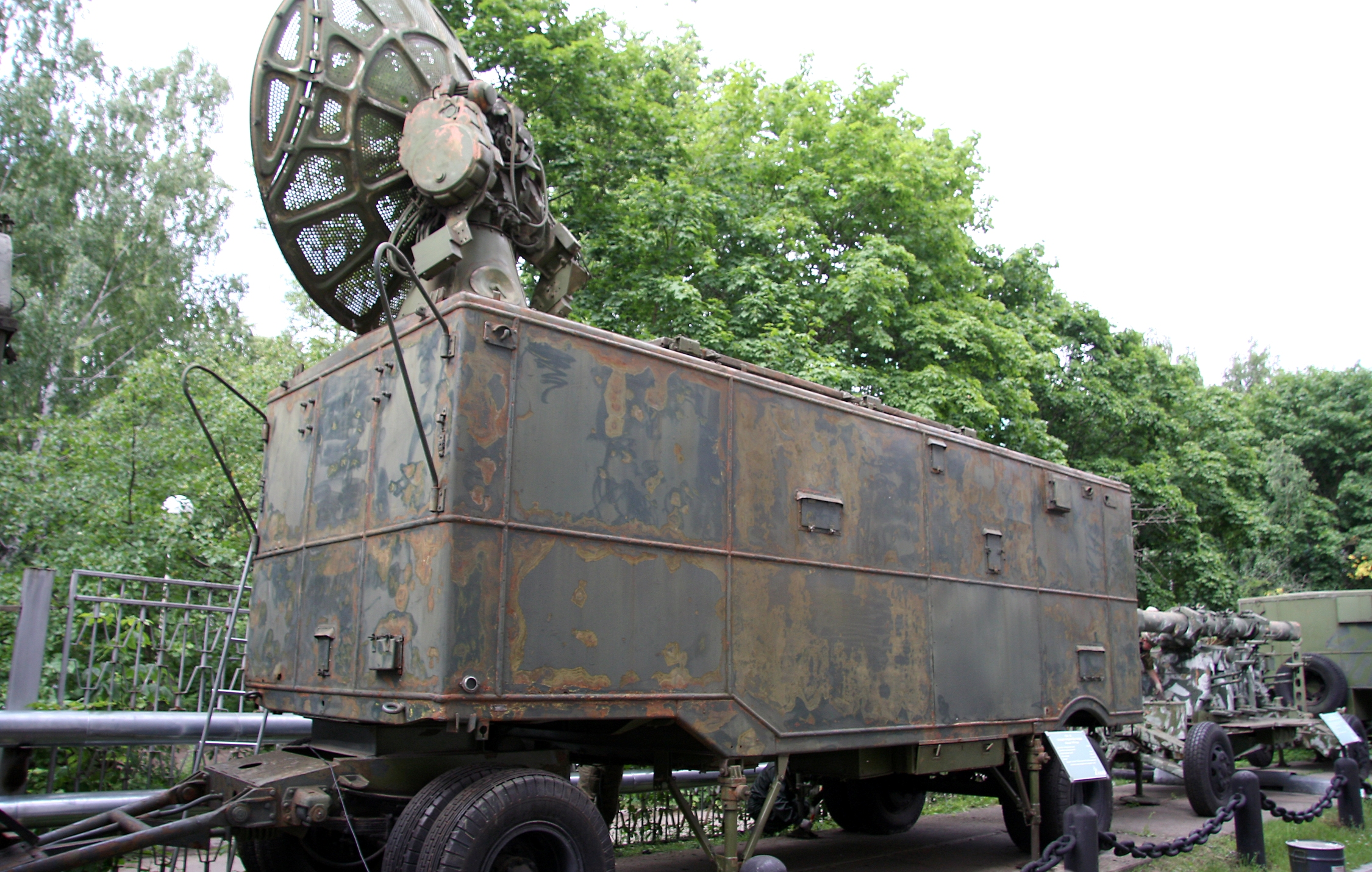
A SON-30 radar in Moscow.

SON-30 (NATO reporting name Fire Wheel) is a type of Russian/Soviet fire director radar for 130 mm anti-aircraft guns. It was a Soviet derivative of the US SCR-584 system.

== See also ==
- SON-9
- SON-50
