= 120 mm gun M1 =

120mm gun M1
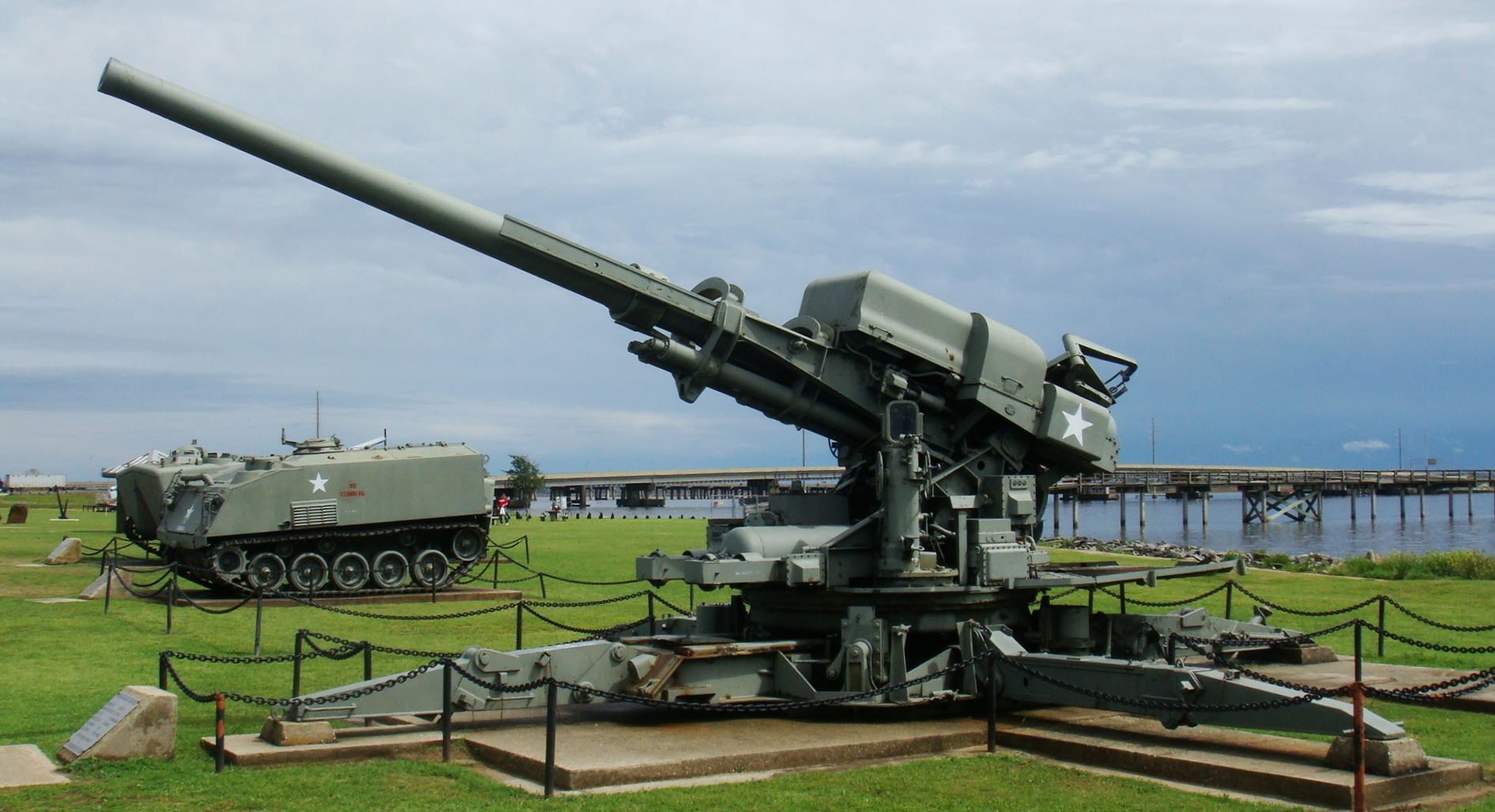
- 120 mm M1 anti-aircraft gun at Battleship Memorial Park
- Type: Anti-aircraft gun
- Place of origin: United States

Service history
- In service: 1944–1960
- Used by: U.S. Army
- Wars: World War II; Korean War

Specifications
- Mass: 64,000 lb (29,000 kg)
- Length: 24½ feet (7.39 m)
- Barrel length: 23½ feet (7.16 m)
- Crew: 13 (gun commander, gunner with eight man squad, ammunition chief supervising two ammunition handlers)
- Shell: 120 × 775 mm R
- Shell weight: 50 lb (22.7 kilograms)
- Caliber: 120 mm L/60
- Barrels: 1
- Breech: Vertical sliding-wedge
- Recoil: Hydro-pneumatic
- Carriage: towed
- Elevation: 80 degrees
- Traverse: 360 degrees
- Rate of fire: 12 rpm
- Muzzle velocity: 3,100 ft/s (945 m/s)
- Maximum firing range: 82,000 ft (25,000 m), 57,500 ft (17,500 m) maximum altitude

The 120 mm gun M1 was the United States Army's standard super-heavy anti-aircraft gun during World War II and the Korean War, complementing the smaller and more mobile M2 90 mm gun in service. Its maximum altitude was about 60,000 ft (18,000 m), which earned it the nickname stratosphere gun.

The M1 gun was used by the Army for air defense from 1944 to 1960, serving primarily in static defensive roles, although it had been designed to be mobile. It became obsolete with the development of anti-aircraft missiles and was phased out after 1954. However, a derivative mounted in the M103 tank served in that capacity until 1974.

== History ==
The United States Army first worked on a 120 mm gun after the end of World War I, with a prototype being presented in 1924. The system was considered far too heavy and expensive to be useful, and the project slowed, although it was never canceled outright.

In 1938, the Army reviewed its needs for newer AA systems and decided to order new systems for both the heavy and super-heavy role. The former was filled by the new M1 90 mm gun, which replaced the earlier M3 3-inch gun then in use. For the super-heavy role, the 120 mm gun design was dusted off and mated to a new eight-wheel carriage, designated 4.7-inch M1 when it was accepted in 1940.

Like the 90 mm, the M1 gun was typically operated in a battery of four guns, initially with an associated searchlight, SCR-268 radar (replaced later by the much-improved SCR-584), M10 gun director, and M4 Gun Data Computer that automatically laid the guns. The M6 tractor was used as the prime mover.

The M1 gun entered service late in World War II. One battalion of M1 guns, the 513th AAA Gun Battalion, was deployed in the Philippines in February 1945, but never fired on any hostile aircraft.

After World War II ended and the Cold War with the Soviet Union began, M1 guns were deployed in many locations in the U.S. and Canada. To defend against long range Soviet Tu-4 bomber attack, the Army Anti-Aircraft Command (ARAACOM) formed 44 active duty and 22 National Guard battalions equipped with M1 guns, divided into seven brigades and 20 anti-aircraft artillery groups. Two Canadian anti-aircraft battalions were also equipped with M1 guns for the joint defense of the Soo Locks. These guns were guided by the long range Lashup Radar Network equipped with AN/CPS-5. M1 guns were deployed for the protection of nuclear production facilities, major industrial centers, strategic air force bases, and select major population centers.

In 1954, the MIM-3 Nike Ajax surface-to-air missile became operational with ARAACOM. It substantially outranged the M1 gun, rendering it obsolete. ARAACOM began retiring the M1 gun from active-duty units and then from National Guard units. Then in 1957, the Soviet Union introduced the R-7, its first ICBM, and the M1 gun became practically useless. By January 1960, all remaining National Guard units with M1 guns were converted to Nike missiles or deactivated.

== Modification as a tank gun ==
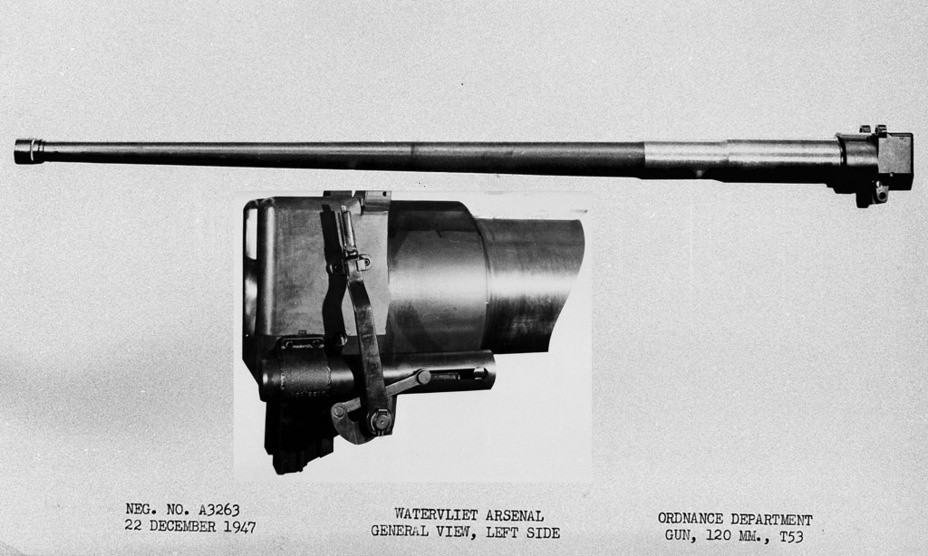
The 120 mm gun T53 intended for the T34 heavy tank.

Design studies began in early 1945 to modify the design of the M1 for use as an armament in heavy tank programs, the result of these being designated 120 mm gun T53. Two T30 Heavy Tank chassis were diverted to fit the gun, resulting in the T34 Heavy Tank. Firing tests revealed issues with fumes from the gun entering the turret, causing flarebacks and a high concentration of toxic gases in the fighting compartment. As a result of this, the design of the gun was modified to fit a bore evacuator.

In 1948, a new heavy tank project T43, later to become the M103, was proposed to use a lightened version of the T53. This gun, 120mm gun T122, was ballistically identical to the earlier model. The design was further evolved with the T123 design increasing the powder pressure from 38,000 to 48,000 psi (260 to 330 MPa), before finally introducing a quick change gun tube with the T123E1. In this form the design was standardized as 120 mm gun M58, which would see service in production M103s.

While the T123 design was still evolving the British Army adopted the gun in a modified form designated as the Royal Ordnance OQF 120mm Tank L1. This was to be the main armament of the Heavy Gun Tanks FV214 Conqueror and FV4004 Conway. The L1 would be produced in two variants, with a thread for a muzzle brake present on the L1A1 but deleted on the L1A2.

== See also ==
- List of U.S. Army weapons by supply catalog designation (SNL D-32)
- Rangekeeper
- Fire-control system
- Kerrison Predictor

=== Weapons of comparable role, performance and era ===
- 12.8 cm FlaK 40
- 130 mm air defense gun KS-30
- 152 mm air defense gun KM-52
- QF 4.5-inch Mk I – V naval gun
- Type 3 12 cm AA gun

== Bibliography ==
- TM 9-2300 Standard Artillery and Fire Control Materiel dated 1944
- TM 9-380
- SNL D-32
- Hunnicutt, Richard Pearce (1988). Firepower: A History of the American Heavy Tank. Novato, California: Presidio Press. ISBN 0-89141-304-9.
- Griffin, Rob (1999). Conqueror. Ramsbury, Wiltshire: The Crowood Press. pp. 113–116. ISBN 1-86126-251-5.
