= SON-9 =

Russian and Soviet military radar

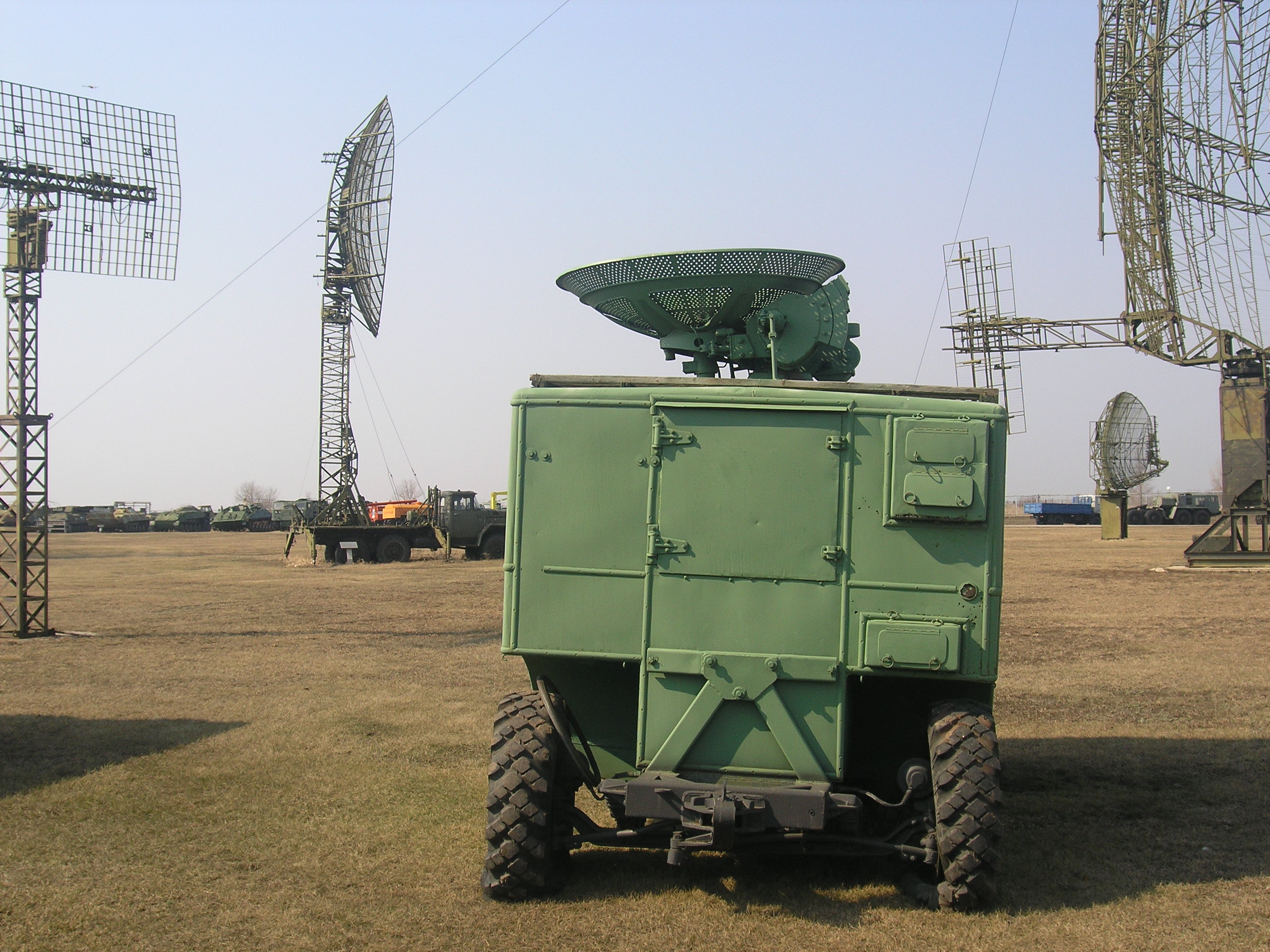
- A SON-9 gun laying radar, AutoVAZ Technical Museum
- Country of origin: Soviet Union
- Type: E-band, trailer-mounted
- Frequency: 2700-2900 MHz
- PRF: 1840-1900 pps
- Beamwidth: 5 degrees (search mode)
- Pulsewidth: 0.3-0.8 microsec
- Power: 300kw (peak)
- Other Names: Fire Can

SON-9 (NATO reporting name Fire Can) is a type of Russian/Soviet fire director radar for air defence guns including the 57 mm, 85mm, and 100 mm, and 130mm anti-aircraft guns. The design was based on an older SON-4 Soviet design that was in turn based on a US-origin SCR-584 system, the plans for which were provided to the USSR during the Second World War. It was used in combination with the PUAZO 6/60 fire director.

== Operational service ==
The SON-9 was widely employed during the Vietnam War, with as many as 75 of them being deployed at one point. Its range of 50 nautical miles was considered useful but the lack of a moving target indicator on the viewing scope complicated the task of tracking fast-moving, low-flying targets. It was also more vulnerable to jamming than newer designs available during the Vietnam War. In use it was van-mounted, and could be used to direct the fire of 4-8 guns.

A captured example of the SON-9 was used by NOTS (Naval Ordnance Test Station) engineers to develop simulator SON-9 radars for training against.

== See also ==
- wikisource:Wild Weasel mission 1 October 1967
- SON-30
- SON-50
