= M103 heavy tank =

American heavy tank

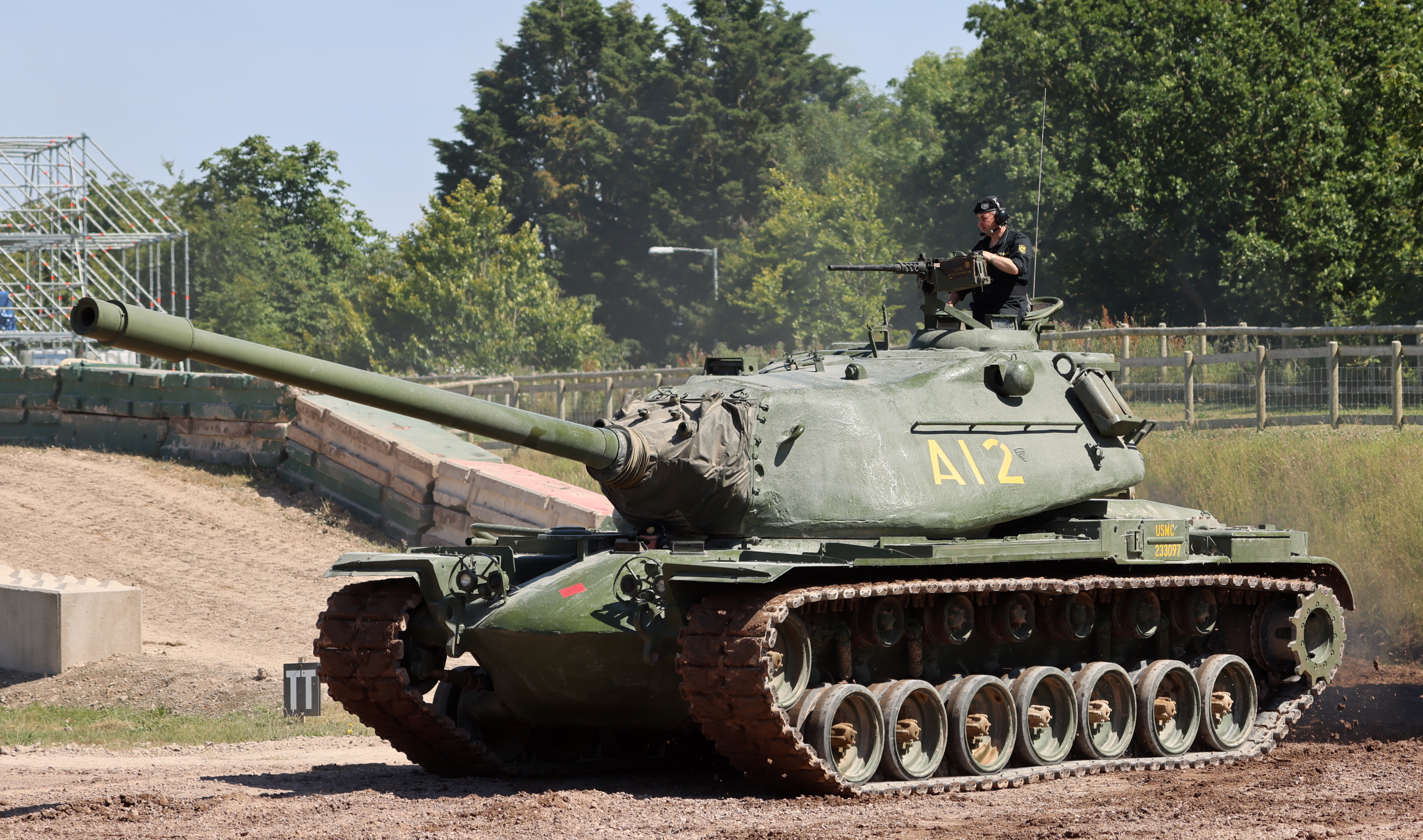
- M103A2 at the Bovington Tank Museum
- Type: Heavy tank
- Place of origin: United States

Service history
- In service: 1957–1974
- Used by: United States

Production history
- Manufacturer: Chrysler
- No. built: 300
- Variants: M103A1, M103A2

Specifications
- Mass: 65 short tons (58 long tons; 59 t)
- Length: 37 ft 2 in (11.33 m)
- Width: 12 ft 2 in (3.71 m)
- Height: 10 ft 6 in (3.20 m)
- Crew: 5 (commander, gunner, driver, 2 loaders)
- Armor: 127 mm (5 in) @ 60 degrees 254 mm LoS (10 in)
- Main armament: (4.7 in ) 120 mm gun M58 L/60, 34 rounds
- Secondary armament: 2×.30-cal (7.62 mm) M1919A4E1 machine gun (co-axial); 1×.50-cal (12.7 mm) M2 AA machine gun
- Engine: (M103A1) Continental AV1790 12-cylinder air-cooled gasoline 810 hp (604 kW) (M103A2) Continental AVDS-1790-2, V12, air-cooled, twin turbocharged diesel 750 hp (560 kW)
- Power/weight: M103A2: 12.7 hp (9.5 kW) / tonne
- Transmission: General Motors CD-850-4A or -4B, 2 ranges forward, 1 reverse
- Suspension: torsion bar
- Fuel capacity: 280 US gallons (1,100 L; 230 imp gal)
- Operational range: M103: 80 mi (130 km); M103A2: 295 mi (480 km)
- Maximum speed: M103: 21 mph (34 km/h); M103A2: 23 mph (37 km/h)

The M103 heavy tank (officially designated 120mm gun combat tank M103, initially T43) was a heavy tank that served in the United States Army and the United States Marine Corps during the Cold War. Introduced in 1957, it served until 1974, by which time evolution of the concept of a main battle tank rendered heavy tanks obsolete.

== Design and development ==
In December 1950, the U.S. Army made blueprints for a heavy tank reference design. In January 1951, it awarded Chrysler a $99 million contract to produce the tank. Chrysler tasked Robert T. Keller, the son of Chrysler Board Chairman K.T. Keller, with overseeing its design, and construction at the company's new Newark, Delaware, tank plant.

The first T43 pilot model was completed in November 1951. Officials said the tank would "out-slug any land-fighting machine ever built."

Like the contemporary British Conqueror, the M103 was designed to counter Soviet heavy tanks, such as the later IS-series tanks or the T-10, if conflict with the Eastern Bloc broke out. Its long-ranged 4.7 in (120 mm) cannon was designed to destroy enemy tanks at extreme distances.

In 1953, the Pentagon began to reverse the Truman administration's policy of a broad production base in favor of recently-appointed Secretary of Defense Charles E. Wilson's "single, efficient producer" concept. In September of that year, Wilson chose General Motors over Chrysler to take over production of the M48 Patton. General Motors would also become heir to any additional T43 orders, after Chrysler fulfilled the initial order. Tank production by Chrysler wrapped up in June 1954. (Note: This change left General Motors as the sole tank producer for the USA as of 1954. Wilson was the CEO of General Motors until his appointment as Secretary of Defense in 1953.)

Some 300 tanks were built between 1953 and 1954, initially designated T43E1. Details about the tank, including production plans and specifications, were tightly held. Seeking to keep the tank out of public sight, Wilson nixed an October 1953 exhibition for the American Ordnance Association at Aberdeen Proving Ground. In May 1954, the tank was debuted publicly at a demonstration at the Newark tank plant.

Testing was unsatisfactory, with the tanks failing to meet Continental Army Command's standards and being put into storage in August 1955. Following the approval of 98 improvements the tank was redesignated the M103 Heavy Tank in April 1956. Of the 300 T43E1s built, 80 went to the US Army (74 of which were rebuilt to M103 standard), and 220 were accepted by the US Marine Corps, to be used as infantry support, rebuilt successively to improved M103A1 and then later M103A2 standards.

As Estes makes clear (2013), while the Army opted for 98 of the simplest production line upgrades and declared its 80 tanks as the type standard M103 tank, the Marine Corps took the complete set of modifications for its 220 tanks and placed them in service as the M103A1 tank.

A House Government Operations subcommittee report in July 1957 called for the heavy tank program to be audited. Investigators had been unable to determine the cost of the program, which was estimated in the hundreds of millions of dollars. The report said the Army had hastened production of the tank for war in Korea despite there being no need for it there. The tank was also unsuited to the rigors of the nuclear battlefield, the report said.

=== Specifics ===
Following contemporary American design philosophy, the M103 was built with a two-piece, cast elliptic armor scheme, similar to the M48's design. It featured seven road wheels per side, mounted with long-arm independent torsion bars. The 28-inch (71 cm) track was shoed in steel backed rubber chevron tracks, allowing for a ground pressure of 12.9 psi (89 kPa). The Continental AV-1790 engine was placed at the rear of the tank, and produced a maximum output of 810 horsepower (600 kW) and 1,600 pound-feet (2,200 N⋅m) of torque, fed through a General Motors CD-850-4 two-speed transmission. This allowed the 60-short-ton (54 t; 54-long-ton) heavy tank to achieve a maximum road speed of 21 miles per hour (34 km/h) and a maximum climbing gradient of 60%.

Initial production versions suffered a host of drivetrain mechanical problems. The Continental powerpack, shared by the much lighter M48 tank, was insufficient to drive the much heavier M103. The tank was, consequently, severely underpowered and very fuel intensive. This presented a host of logistical problems for the vehicle, most prominently the extremely limited range of just 80 miles (130 km). Though this was partially corrected with the introduction of the AV-1790-2 diesel unit, the M103 would remain cumbersome and fuel-thirsty for the majority of its service life.

The crew of an M103A1 consisted of: 1 - driver, 2 - gunner, 3-4 - two loaders, 5 - commander

For ease of production, many of the large components of the tank were made from cast armor. This design scheme was also much more mass efficient than traditional rolled plate armor. Despite being better protected than the T29-series of prototypes which preceded it, the M103 was nearly 10 short tons (9.1 t; 8.9 long tons) lighter, making it competitive with the Soviet T-10/IS-8 tank. The frontal hull glacis was a compound pike, welded at the center seam, with up to 10-inch (250 mm) thick armor at the front. The turret was a massive single-piece cast design, fitted with heavily sloped 10-inch (250 mm) rolled-homogeneous armor.

The M103 was designed to mount the 4.7 in (120 mm) M58 gun, fitted in the M89 turret mount. Using standard Armor-Piercing Ballistic Cap Tracer rounds, it was capable of penetrating 221 millimetres (8.7 in) of 30-degree sloped rolled-homogeneous armor at 1,000 yards (910 m) and 196 millimetres (7.7 in) at 2,000 yards (1,800 m). It could also penetrate 124 millimetres (4.9 in) 60-degree sloped rolled-homogeneous armor at 1,000 yards (910 m) and 114 millimetres (4.5 in) at 2,000 yards (1,800 m). The commander could select from 34 rounds of either M358 Armor-Piercing Ballistic Cap Tracer Rounds or M469 HEAT shells, mounted at the rear of the turret and in the hull. With both loaders, the maximum firing rate of the gun was five rounds per minute, owing to the design of the two-piece ammunition. Using the electrohydraulic turret traverse, the gunner could turn the turret at 18 degrees per second, with 15 degrees of elevation and 8 degrees of gun depression.

The armor was made from welded rolled and cast homogeneous steel of varying thickness.

	T43	M103	M103A1	M103A2
Length (gun forward)	448.6 in (11.4 m)			442.2 in (11.2 m)
Width	147.6 in (3.7 m) (over sandshields)	143.0 in (3.6 m) (over tracks)		
Height	126.7 in (3.2 m) (over cupola)	140.1 in (3.6 m) (over MG)		
Ground clearance	16.1 in (40.9 cm)	15.4 in (39.1 cm)		
Top speed	25 mph (40 km/h)	21 mph (34 km/h)		23 mph (37 km/h)
Fording	48 in (1.2 m)		48 in (1.2 m) (w/o kit); 96 in (2.4 m) (w/ kit)	
Max. grade	60%			
Max. trench	7.5 ft (2.3 m)			8.5 ft (2.6 m)
Max. wall	27 in (0.7 m)	36 in (0.9 m)		
Range	80 mi (130 km)		80 mi (130 km); 145 mi (233 km) (jettison tanks)	300 mi (480 km)
Power	810 hp (600 kW) at 2800 rpm			740 hp (550 kW) at 2400 rpm
Power-to-weight ratio	13.5 hp/ST (11.1 kW/t)	13.0 hp/ST (10.7 kW/t)		11.7 hp/ST (9.6 kW/t)
Torque	1,575 lb⋅ft (2,140 N⋅m) at 2200 rpm	1,600 lb⋅ft (2,170 N⋅m) at 2200 rpm		1,710 lb⋅ft (2,320 N⋅m) at 1800 rpm
Weight, combat loaded	120,000 lb (54,430 kg)	125,000 lb (56,700 kg)		128,000 lb (58,060 kg)
Ground pressure	12.4 psi (85 kPa)	12.9 psi (89 kPa)	13.0 psi (90 kPa)	13.2 psi (91 kPa)
Main armament	T122 4.7 in (120 mm) gun	M58 120 mm gun		
Elevation, main gun	+15° / −8°			
Traverse rate	20 seconds/360°		17 seconds/360°	
Elevation rate	4°/second			
Main gun ammo	34 rounds	33 rounds	38 rounds	
Firing rate	5 rounds/minute (two loaders)			

Armor
Aspect	Thickness – inches (mm)	Angle to vertical degrees
Hull front, upper	5 (127)	60
Hull front, lower	4.5 (114)	50
Hull side, upper	equals 2 (51)	40
Hull side, lower	equals 1.75 (44)	30
Hull top	1 (25)	90
Hull floor, front	1.5 (38)	90
Hull floor, rear	1.25 (32)	90
Turret mantlet	10–4 (254–102)	0–45
Turret front	5 (127)	50
Turret side	5.38–2.78 (137–70)	20–40
Turret rear	2 (51)	40
Turret top	1.5 (38)	85–90

== Service ==
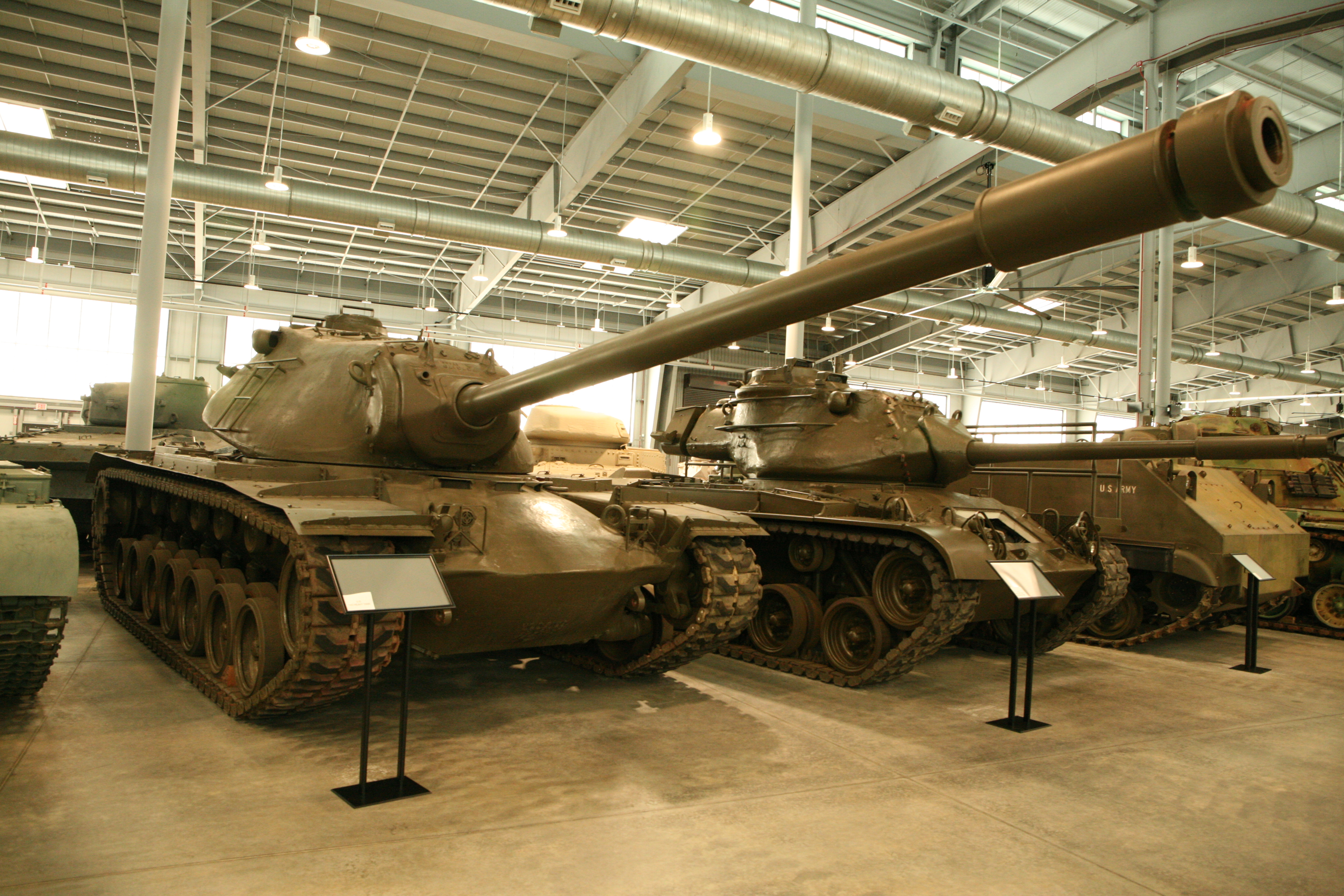
T43 pilot #1 at the U.S. Army Armor & Cavalry Collection at Fort Benning

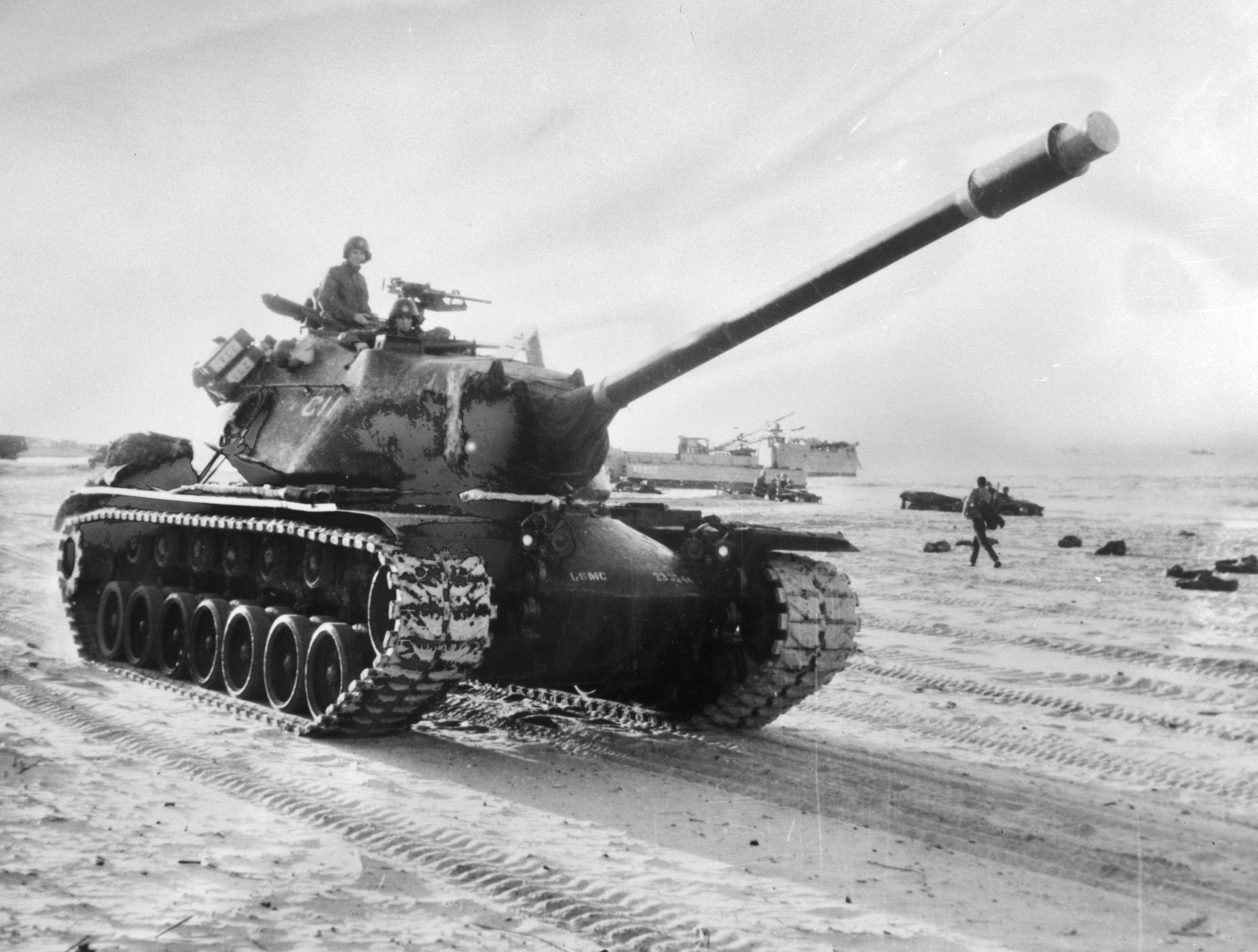
A Marine M103 on American-Spanish naval exercises, October 1964

US Army 7th Army wanted the new heavy tank to supplement its M48 tanks. In Europe, the US Army fielded only one battalion of heavy tanks, from January 1958, originally assigned to the 899th Tank Battalion, later re-designated to the 2nd Battalion, 33rd Armor Regiment. The US Army heavy armor battalion, in contrast to other armor units, was organized into four tank companies, composed of six platoons each, of which each platoon contained three M103s, for a total of 18 tanks per company. Standard US Army armor battalions at the time had three companies per battalion, each with three five-tank platoons, with 17 tanks per company (two tanks were in headquarters platoon).

In March 1959, the Army requested to borrow 72 M103A1 tanks from the USMC, which was agreed to on March 11th. These tanks were sent to Europe in May and June. The Army agreed to return them in like condition. The tanks were returned during 1963. (Estes, 2013)

One of the flaws of M103 vehicle was it did not have adequate reliability in retreat operations. US Army was aware that more Tiger tanks had been lost during retreat operations than during actual combat, and US Army in Europe could not afford that. In Europe it was found that the engine was underpowered, requiring replacement of engines and transmissions after only about 500 mi (800 km).

In addition, the ammunition stowage was not convenient, repeated firing caused excess chamber erosion, and tracks were easily thrown. Last but not least crew safety, comfort and ability to function were impaired by poor interior arrangement.

The M103 was placed on the road to obsolescence when the US Army shifted to the concept of a single main battle tank optimizing firepower, protection, and mobility in a single medium tank design. The U.S. M60 tank fulfilled the breakthrough functions of M103 heavy tank while retaining the mobility of M48 medium tanks. By that time it was years since US Army had realized Soviet heavy tanks were not as potent as suspected, and thus the M103s were rather overkill and expensive to deal with T-54 and T-55 tanks.

The US Marine Corps assigned one M103 company to each of its three Marine tank battalions, including its Marine reserve units. The M103 was never used in combat. Five were deployed to Guantanamo Bay Naval Base during the Cuban Missile Crisis.

The USMC continued to deploy M103A1 tanks to Guantanamo Defense Force mission, by way of the 2nd Tank Battalion, C Company. Every six months five M103A1/A2s and two flame tanks were shipped to Guantanamo to train, exercise and man a two-tank guard post, in revetments, overlooking the fences and minefields, esp. in case of attack by IS-2 heavy tanks or SU-100 tank destroyers. The use of M103s in this role ran from 1963-71. (Estes, 2013)

The USMC did not deploy these heavy tanks to Vietnam due to a lack of suitable targets. (Estes, 2013)

While the US Army deactivated its heavy armor units with the reception of the new M60 series main battle tanks in 1963, the remaining M103s stayed within the US Marine Corps inventory until they began receiving the M60 series main battle tank. With the disappearance of the heavy tank from US forces came the full acceptance of the main battle tank in 1960 for the US Army, and 1973 for the US Marine Corps. Although the later variants of the M1 Abrams main battle tank utilize the same caliber of main gun, 4.7 in (120 mm), the M103's cannon was a rifled gun firing a separate-loading round, in which the projectile was loaded into the breech, followed by a cartridge case consisting of a brass case, primer, and propellant in a fixed unit. This separate-loading system necessitated the use of two loaders. The only part of the cartridge case consumed during firing was the propellant and a plastic cap on the end of the brass cartridge case. The spent brass cartridge case was ejected after firing. The M1A1 tank's 4.7 in (120 mm) main gun is a smooth bore firing a semi-caseless round, ejecting only a back cap of the original loaded round; the bulk of the M1A1's 4.7 in (120 mm) shell casing is consumed during firing.

While the USMC was pleased with the initial M103A1 tanks, they were even more pleased by the A2 version, which was a highly successful upgrade. Testing over time proved to the Corps that the M103A1/A2 were superior to the M60 in both firepower and armor protection. Its 120 mm main gun outperformed all the other weapons tested for the then new M60 at the Aberdeen Proving Ground in October 1958. Besting even the British X15E8 that was eventually selected for the M60. (Estes, 2013)

NOTE: Estes (2013) clarifies why the USMC only fielded 219 M103A1 tanks, as one tank out of the 220 was retained by Ordnance for testing and configuration reference. And the reason why 218 of these were upgraded to the M103A2 standard is that one was a pilot vehicle given to the Army, used to proof the design.

== Ammunition ==
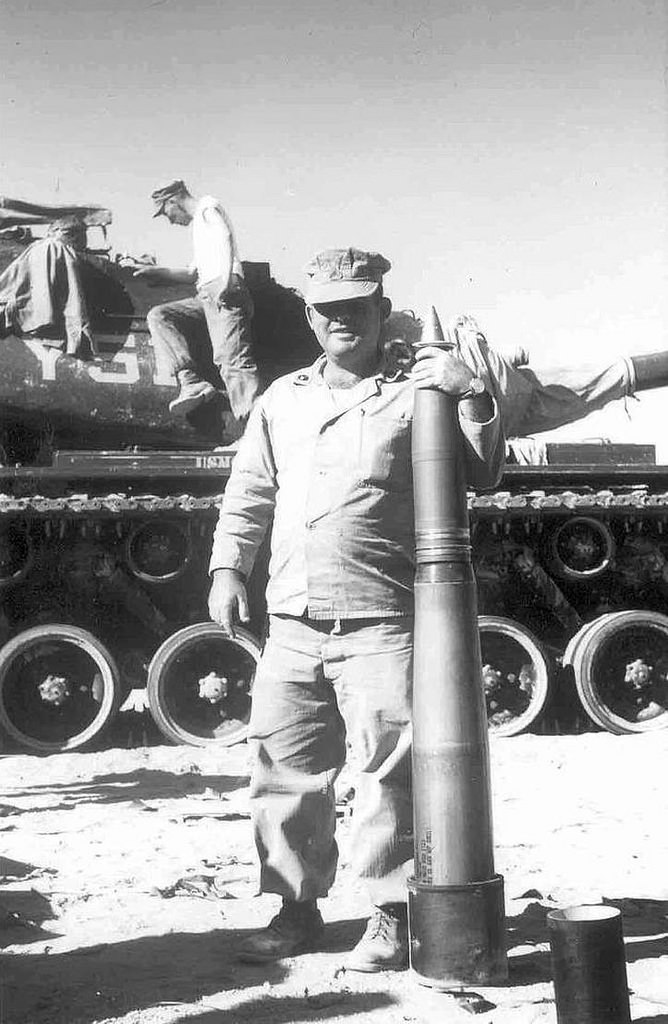
US Marine Corps 1st Tank Battalion staff sergeant holding an M356 HE-T high-explosive round in 1959

Ammunition for M103's M58 gun included:

- M358 APBC-T
- M356 HE-T
- M357 WP-T
- M359E2 TP-T
- M469 HEAT-T

== Variants ==
- T43 – Six pilot vehicles produced in 1951.
- T43E1 – 300 built in 1953.
- T43E2 – Two vehicles produced from 1955–1956. Turret basket and gunner moved to front of turret. New targeting system (T52 rangefinder, T33 computer, T44 gunners periscopic sight) and hydraulic turret traverse replaced with electric
- T-58 - A experimental prototype developed in the 1950's.
- M103 – Produced in 1957. 74 converted into other models.
- M103A1 Produced in 1959. 219 converted or rebuilt. New sight (Stereoscopic T52) and M14 ballistic computer. Removed one coaxial machine gun. New turret electric amplidyne system traverse. Turret basket.
- M103A2 Produced 1964. 153 converted or rebuilt. New 750 hp (559 kW) diesel engine from the M60 tank, increasing the road range to 295 mi (480 km) and maximum speed to 23 mph (37 km/h). The M15 Stereoscopic Rangefinder was replaced with the M24 Coincidence Rangefinder. [Estes (2013) states that 218 of the M103A1 tanks were converted into M103A2 tanks by the Army for the Marine Corps.]

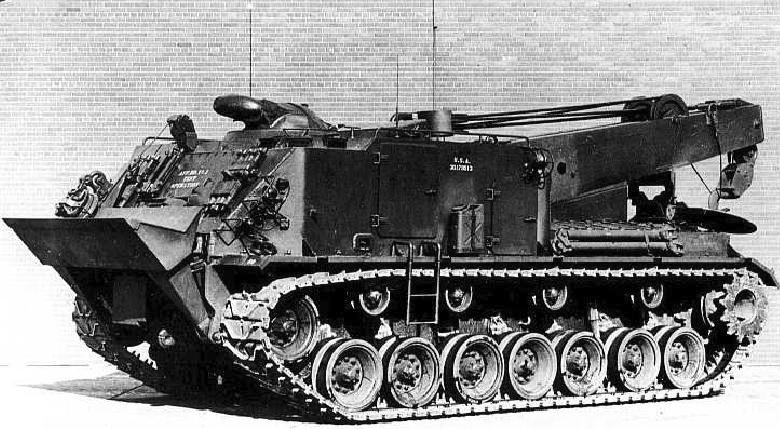
M51 recovery vehicle under evaluation tests at Fort Knox in 1951

- Heavy Recovery Vehicle M51 Initially built 1954–1955 and modified 1956–1958 to bring up to standard. Tank recovery version of the M103 heavy tank. 187 built by Chrysler.
- Manned Evasive Target Tank M103A2s modified in 1977 for use as targets in training TOW missile crews (firing dummy warheads).

== Operators ==
- United States
  - The U.S. Army operated 80 T43E1 tanks, 74 of them were later converted to the M103 standard.
  - The U.S. Marines operated 220 T43E1 tanks, 219 of them which were later converted to the M103A1 then 154 were rebuilt to the M103A2 standard.

== Surviving examples ==
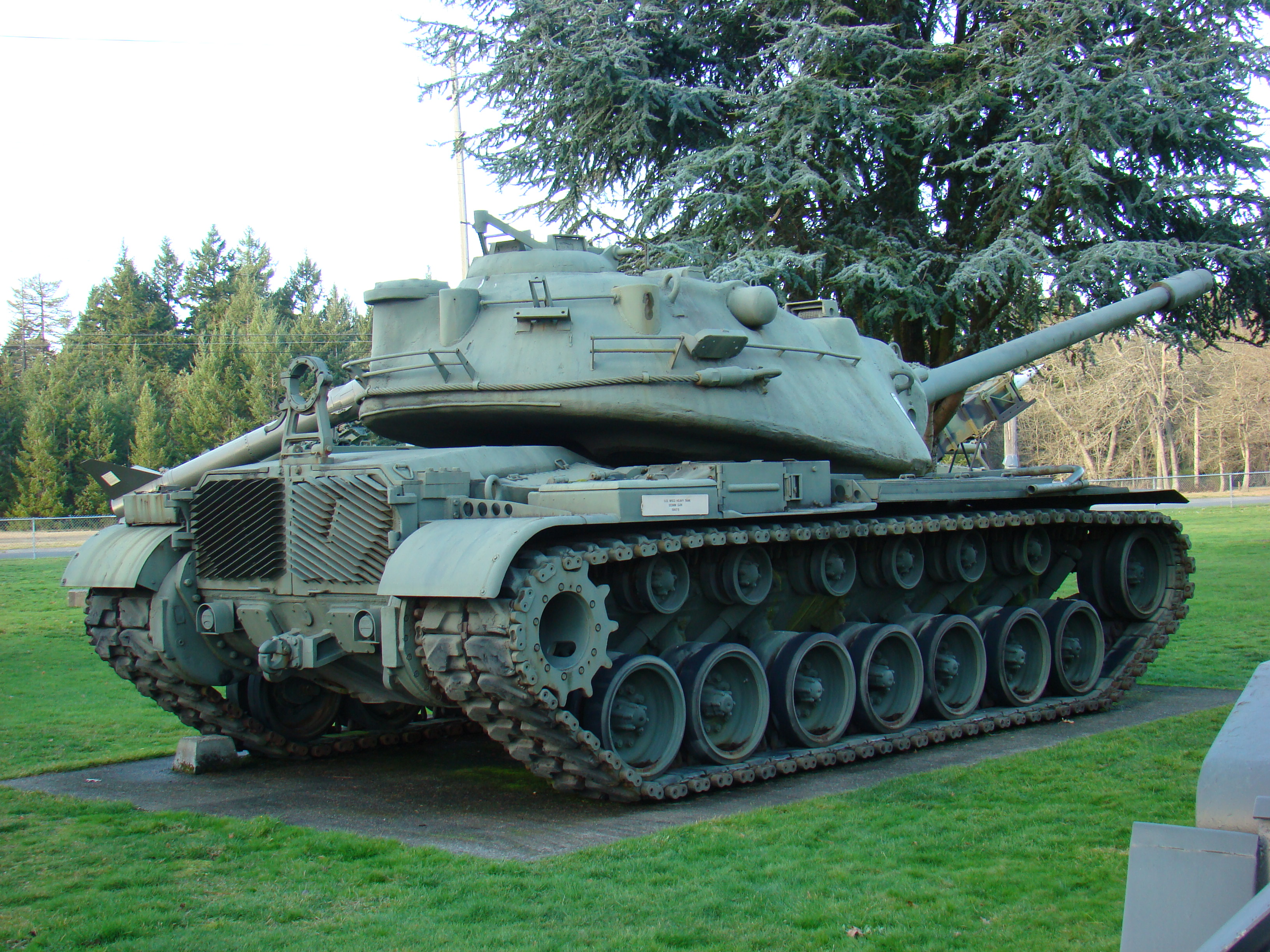
M103A2 at Ft. Lewis

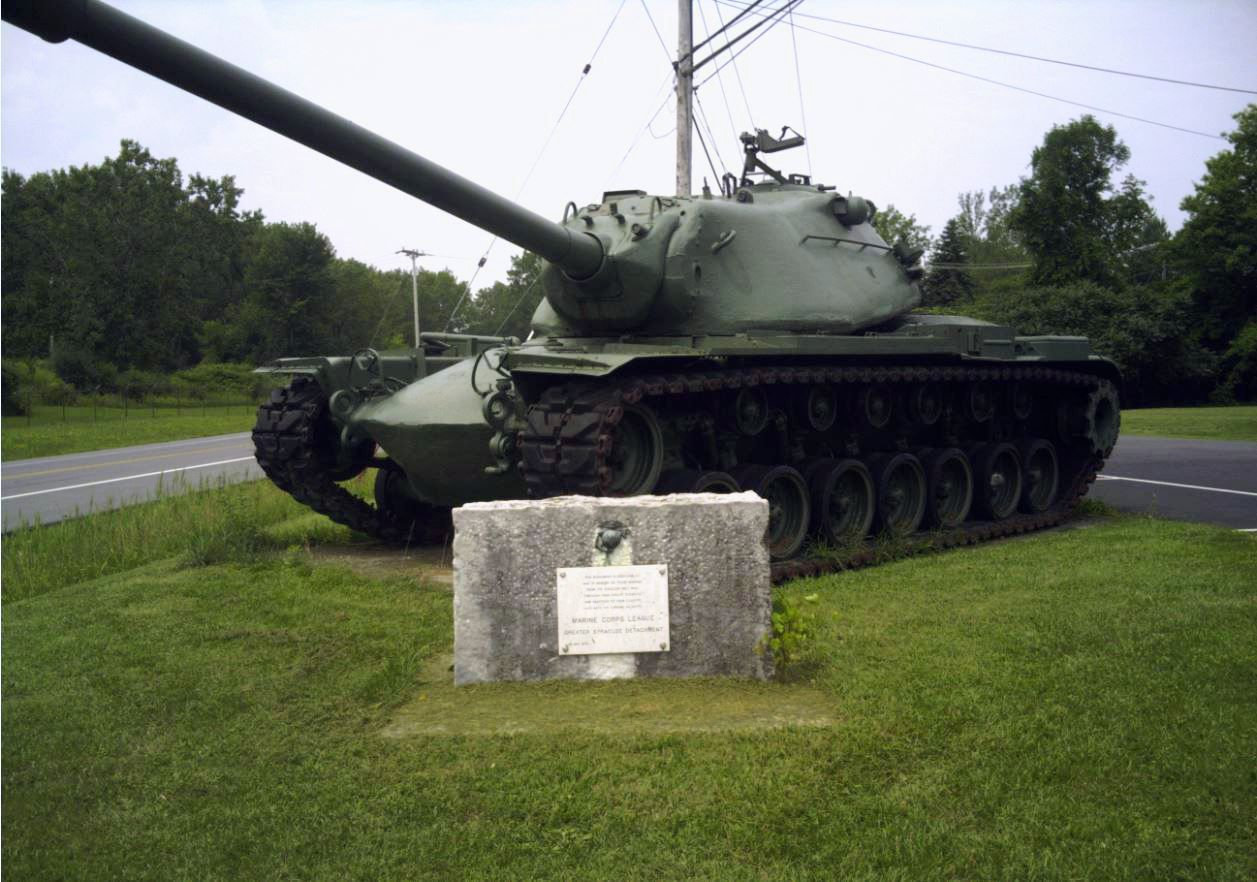
M103A2 heavy tank in front of Armed Forces Reserve Center Syracuse

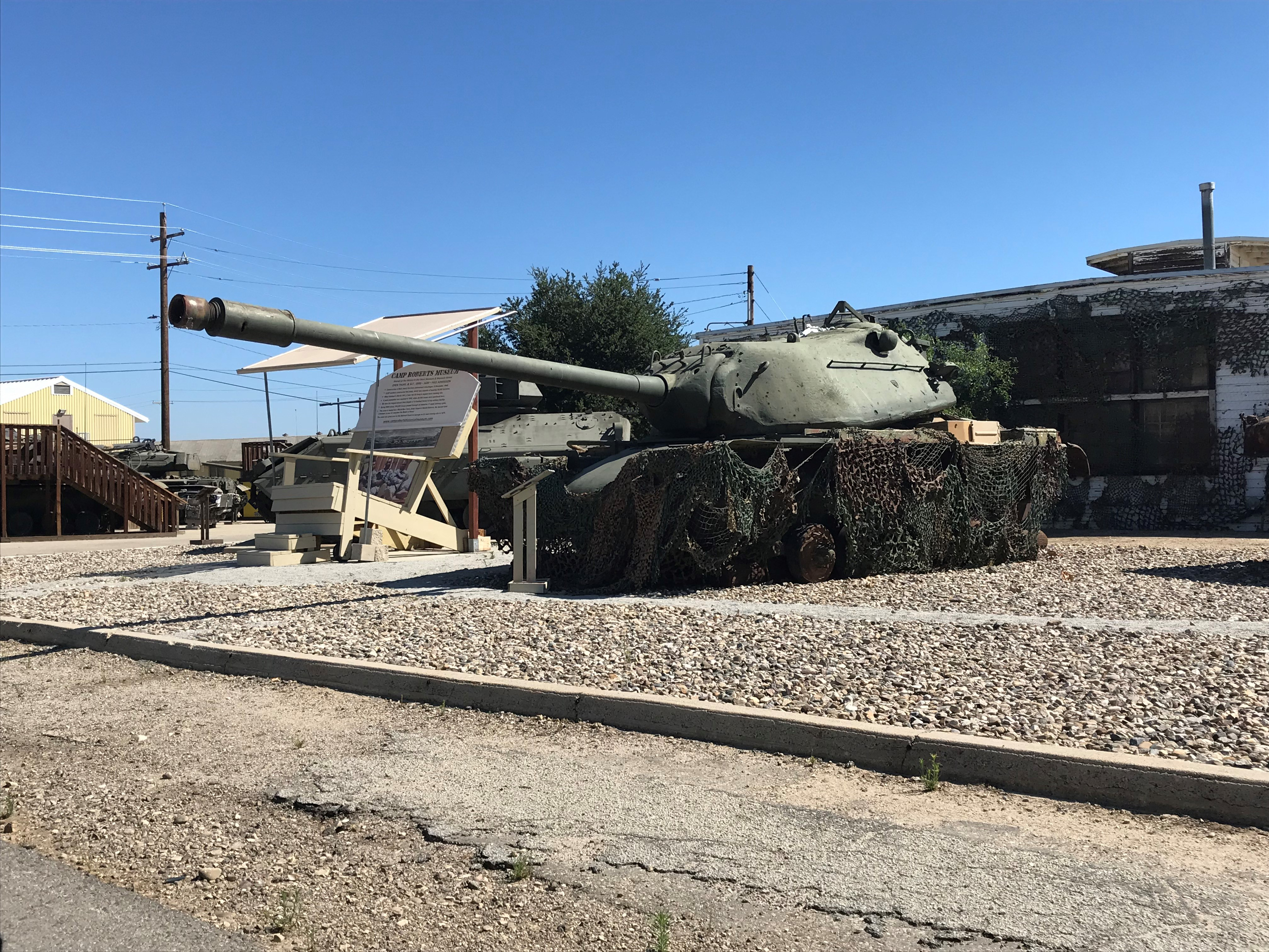
M103 tank at Camp Roberts Historical Museum

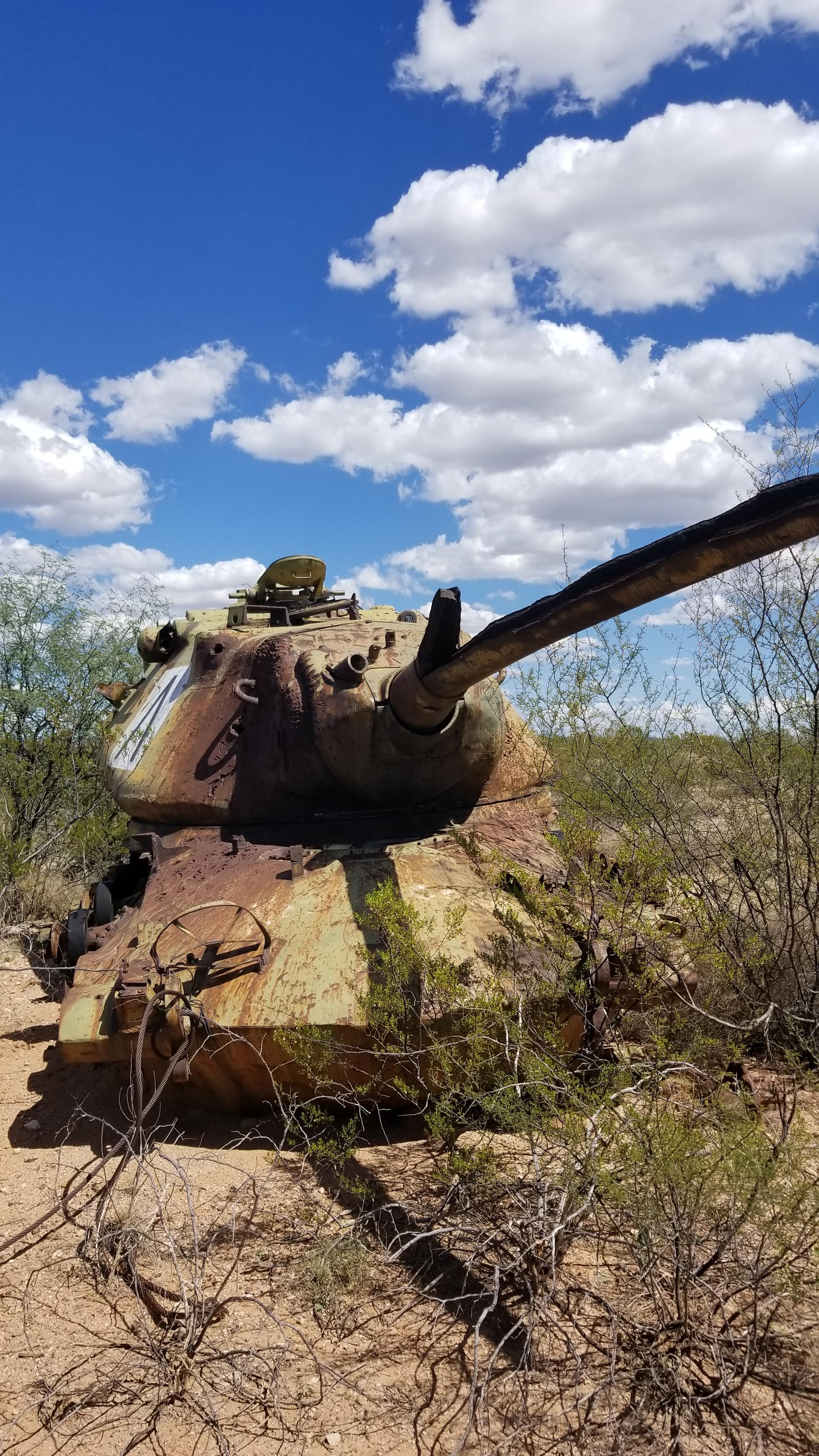
Blown out M103 on Ft. Huachuca, Arizona

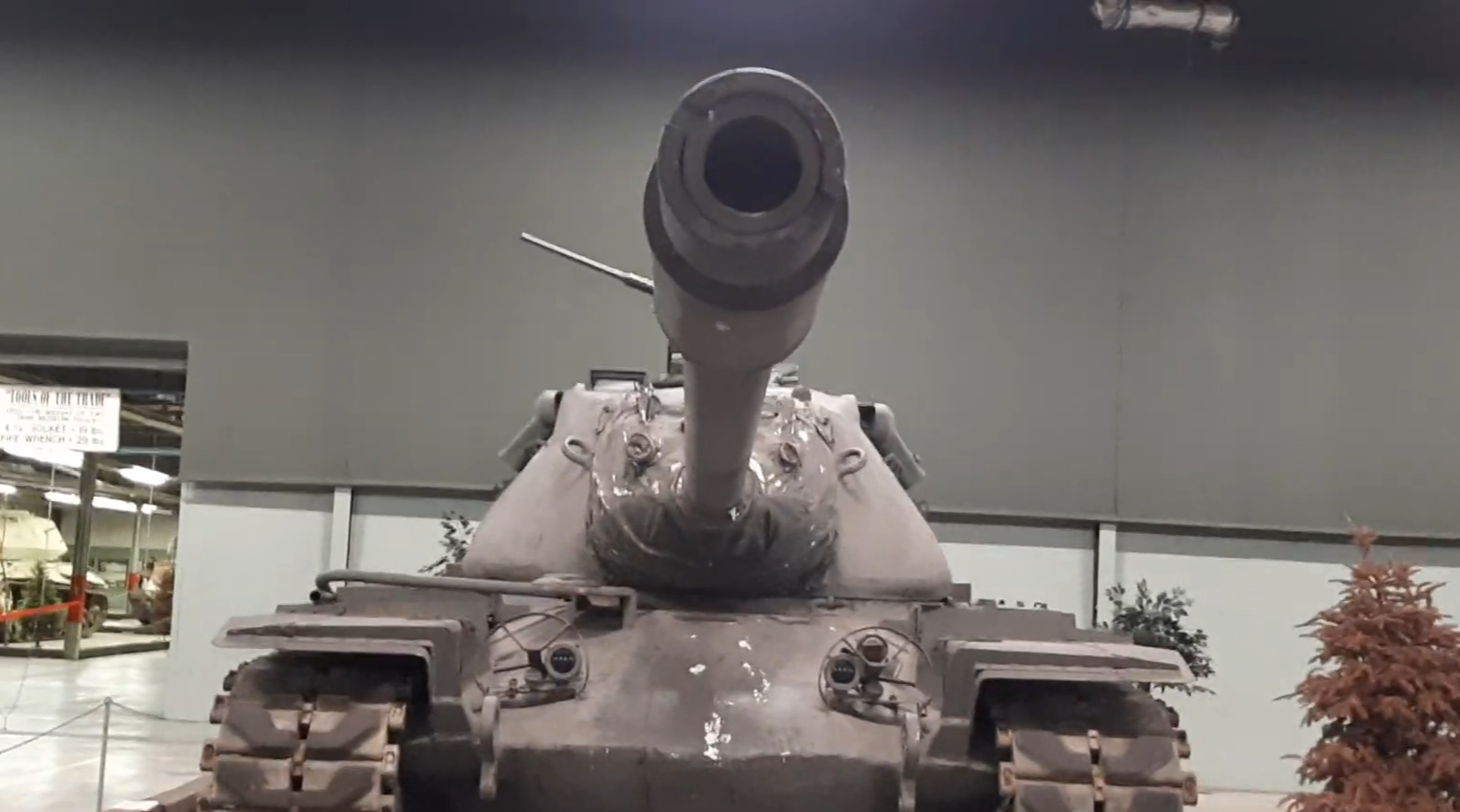
M103A2 display at the AAF Tank Museum

Existing M103 and M103A2s include:

Location	Model
Range 408A, Camp Pendleton, California	Blown out, former practice target
U.S. Army Ordnance Center and Museum at the Aberdeen Proving Grounds	M103
Radcliff, Kentucky	M103
Shively, Kentucky	M103A2
Mt. Sterling, Kentucky	M103A1
Rod Lowe Post #124 American Legion, Greensburg, Kentucky	M103A1
Fort Lewis, Washington	M103A2
Fort McClellan, Anniston, Alabama	M103A2
45th Infantry Museum, Oklahoma City, Oklahoma	M103A2
Armed Forces Center, Syracuse, New York @ 1064 E Molloy Rd., Salina, New York.	M103A2
Veteran’s Memorial Park, 315 S. Marquette St. Davenport, Iowa	M103
Military Vehicle Technology Foundation in Portola Valley, California	M103A2
3d Cavalry Regiment Museum, Fort Hood, Texas	M103
Marine Corps Mechanized Museum, Camp Pendleton, California
Newman Park, Sweetwater, Texas	non-functioning
Pioneer Park, Nacogdoches, Texas	non-functioning
Euclid City Hall, E. 222nd Street. Euclid, Ohio	M103A2
Heritage Center of the Yuma Proving Ground, Yuma, Arizona	
Dugway Proving Ground, Utah	M103 hulk for testing
Former VFW in Anniston, Alabama (Google Street View shows it was removed sometime between 2014 and 2019)
The Tank Museum, Bovington, UK	M103A2, running condition
American Armor Foundation Tank Museum, Danville, Virginia	M103A2
United States Army TACOM Life Cycle Management Command, Warren, Michigan
Camp Shelby, Mississippi	M103
U.S. Army Armor & Cavalry Collection, Fort Benning, Georgia	M103A1, M103A2, T43 & M51
Range 68 MOUT site, Fort Bragg, North Carolina	non-functioning
On display at the Calvary Cemetery, Yakima, WA, at 46°34'28.79"N 120°32'21.26"W	M103A2
Institute of Military Technology, Titusville, Florida	M103A2
Clay County Veterans Memorial in Lineville City Park, Lineville, Alabama
Camp Roberts Historical Museum, Camp Roberts, California	non-functioning, rusted interior, missing track pieces and wheels on the exterior
Fort Huachuca, Arizona, at 31°37'27.94"N 110°19'45.42"W, 31°37'28.04"N 110°19'38.20"W, and 31°37'30.04"N 110°19'36.56"W. 2 others are unlocated.	5 M103A2s All have been exposed to the elements, with all missing parts.
Pima Air & Space Museum, Tucson, Arizona on outdoor display at the new Tucson Military Vehicle Museum. It is the gate guardian vehicle in the entrance roundabout. This is the same vehicle, marked USMC 23298, that was formerly at the Yakima Marine Reserve Center, Yakima, WA.	M103A2

== See also ==
- T110 heavy tank canceled M103 successor
