= KS-19 =

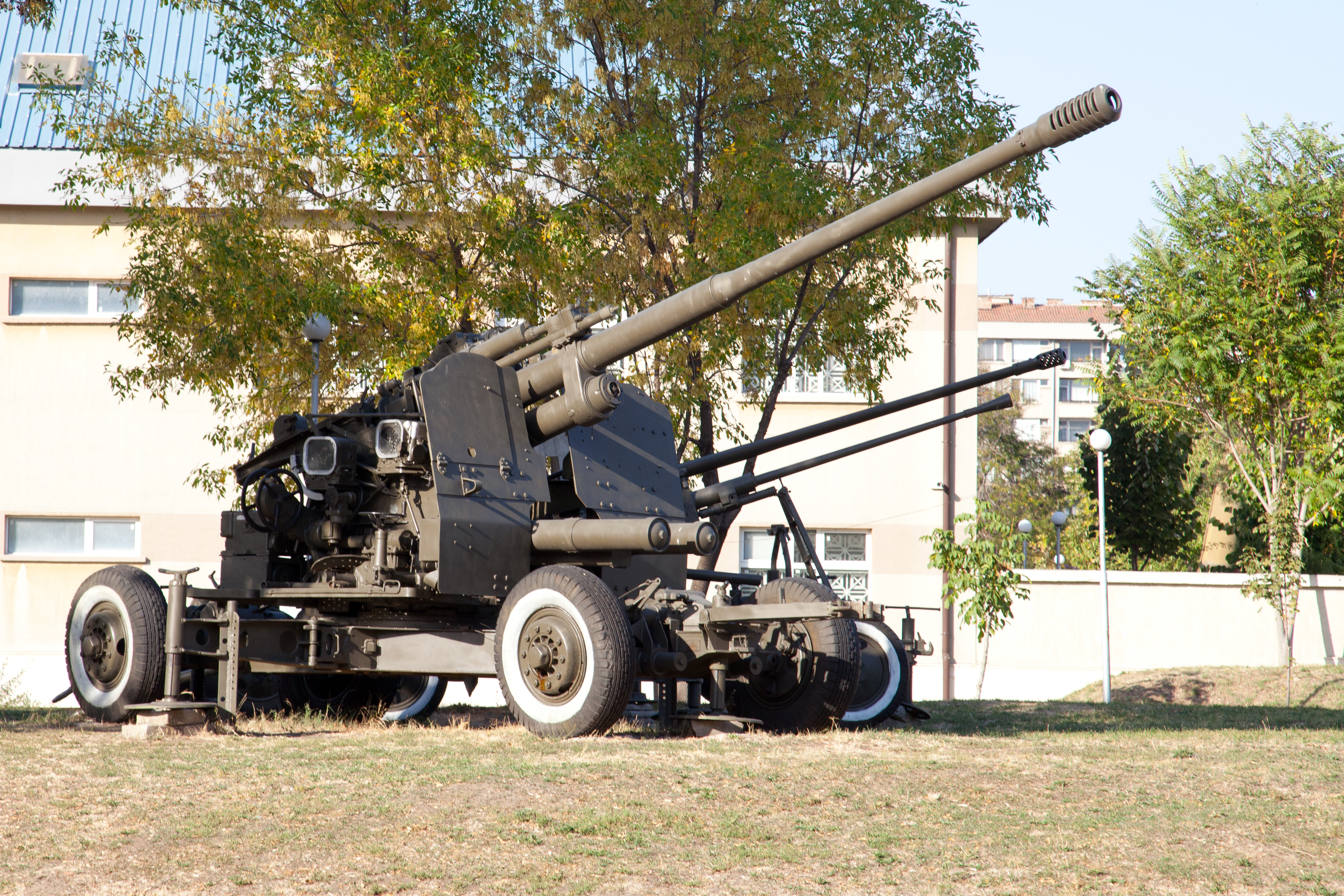
- On display at the National Museum of Military History in Sofia, Bulgaria
- Type: Anti-aircraft gun
- Place of origin: Soviet Union

Service history
- In service: 1948−present
- Used by: See § Operators
- Wars: Korean War; Vietnam War; Iran–Iraq War; Soviet–Afghan War; Gulf War; Somali Civil War; 2003 invasion of Iraq; Russo-Ukrainian War; Second Nagorno-Karabakh War

Production history
- Designer: L. V. Lyuliev
- Designed: 1947
- Manufacturer: Plant No. 4, Perm
- Produced: 1948−1957
- No. built: 10,151
- Variants: See § Variants

Specifications
- Mass: 9,550 kg (21,050 lb)
- Length: 9.45 m (31.0 ft)
- Barrel length: 5.742 m (18.84 ft)
- Width: 2.35 m (7 ft 9 in)
- Height: 2.201 m (7 ft 2.7 in)
- Crew: 15
- Shell: AP-T, APC-T, HE, HE-FRAG, FRAG
- Caliber: 100 mm (3.9 in)
- Action: Semi-automatic horizontal sliding wedge
- Elevation: +85°/-3°
- Traverse: 360°
- Rate of fire: 15 rpm
- Maximum firing range: 21 km (13 mi) (horizontal); 15 km (9.3 mi) (vertical, proximity fuze); 12.7 km (7.9 mi) (vertical, time fuze)

The KS-19 100mm anti-aircraft gun (Russian: КС-19 100мм зенитная установка) is a Soviet anti-aircraft gun that also features efficient capabilities against ground targets.

== Characteristics ==
The KS-19 is a towed anti-aircraft gun that was specifically designed to excel in ground combat, particularly against armored targets and as artillery. Due to its towed nature, it requires an external means of mobility, typically an AT-S Medium or AT-T Heavy tracked artillery tractor. The 15-man crew is transported on the tractor, along with readily available ammunition for the gun.

This rifled gun boasts a semiautomatic horizontal sliding wedge block, a power rammer, an automatic fuze setter, and a long muzzle brake. The loading tray allows for quick and efficient ammunition loading, enabling a well-trained crew to fire a maximum of 15 rounds per minute. The fire control system comprises the PUAZO-6/19 directional system, along with a SON 9 (NATO Reporting name 'Fire Can') or SON-9A fire control radar. While the onboard sights are adequate for engaging air targets, greater accuracy is achieved when used in conjunction with the fire control radar.

The ammunition is of a fixed type and is largely interchangeable with other 100mm rifled tank and field guns. Anti-aircraft ammunition includes high explosive, high explosive fragmentation, and fragmentation types. The two types of armor-piercing rounds are the AP-T (Armor Piercing-Tracer) and the APC-T (Armor Piercing Capped-Tracer). The AP-T round is reputed to penetrate 185 mm of armor at a range of 1000 m.

== History ==
The KS-19 gun was developed to replace the 85mm anti-aircraft guns that were used during World War II. It was widely adopted by all of the Warsaw Pact armies and saw action with communist forces in both Korea and Vietnam.

However, the KS-19 gun has largely been phased out of front line arsenals due to the increased use of more effective surface-to-air missiles. As a result, it is no longer a commonly used weapon in modern warfare.

=== Iraq ===
It was estimated that Iraq had 200 guns in service prior to 1990, around Baghdad alone from 1980 until 2003. During the Gulf War and 2003 invasion of Iraq, the anti-aircraft guns and tactics used by the Iraqis proved to be obsolete in face of the coalition use of electronic warfare and precision munitions capable of striking targets outside of AA gun range.

=== Russo-Ukrainian War ===
At the beginning of the Russian invasion of Ukraine in February 2022, a number of KS-19 guns were stored in Balakliia. However, the city was captured by Russian forces on March 3 and it is believed that the Russians may have used some of the guns as decoys. During the Kharkiv counteroffensive in 2022, Ukraine regained control of Balakliia on September 10.

As of April 1, 2023, it has been reported that Ukraine is using some of the KS-19 guns that were stored in Balakliia for indirect fire against ground targets, and possibly for direct fire as well. One advantage of using these guns as artillery is that they fire older ammunition that is not commonly used by other Ukrainian artillery. In fact, one of the Soviet UOF-412 rounds that was seen in use had been manufactured as far back as 1962.

== Variants ==
=== Soviet Union ===
- KS-19 − Original production model introduced in 1948 on KZU-16 carriage.
- KS-19M − Updated model introduced in 1951. The grooves in the barrel were broadened to reduce the projectile's friction and reduce barrel wear.
- KS-19M2 − Final production model introduced in 1955. Features the heavier and more stable KZU-28 carriage, which is easier to set up as well. Produced until 1957
- KSM-65 − Late modification, coastal defence, produced in some Soviet state factories until 1957

=== China ===
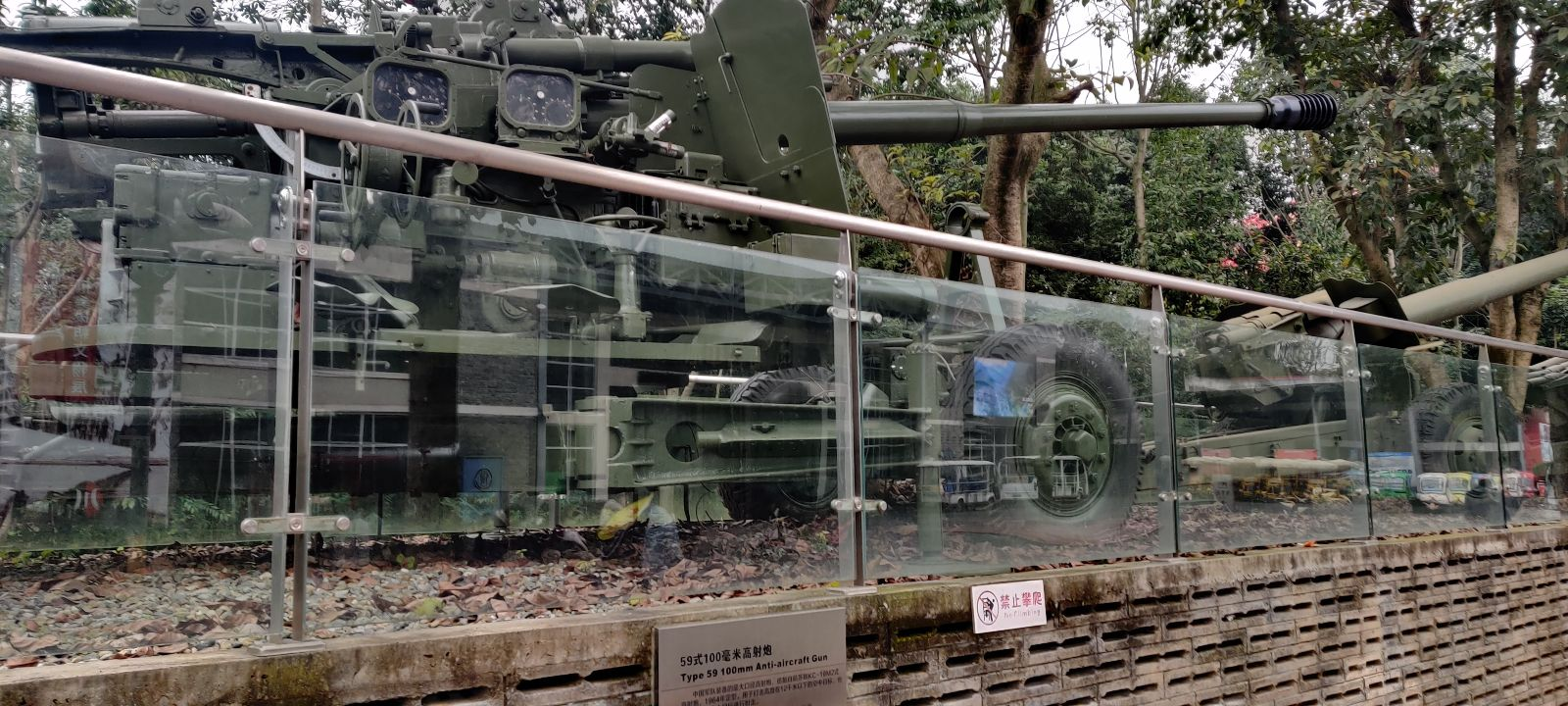
Chinese Type 59 anti aircraft gun, license produced KS-19 in Jianchuan Museum.

- Type 59 − Chinese production model.

=== Iran ===
- Sa'eer − Iranian upgrade of either Soviet KS-19 or Chinese Type 59 with automatic targeting and reloading system revealed to the public in November 2011. Since then also observed in use in Iraq mounted on a truck.

=== Self-propelled guns ===
According to photographic evidence, Hezbollah has developed improvised mounts based on a 2P25 tracked chassis and a truck chassis. Similarly, the Ukrainian Territorial Defence Forces also made use of improvised truck mounted guns in the indirect fire support role during the Russian invasion of Ukraine.

== Surviving Examples ==
- Jianchuan Museum - Type 59 variant

== Operators ==
=== Current ===
- Armenia
- Azerbaijan – 8
- Cuba – Unknown
- Guinea – 4
- Iran
- Mauritania – 12
- North Korea
- Republic of the Congo - Unknown
- Syria – Unknown
- Vietnam

=== Former ===
- Afghanistan
- Albania − 56 as of 2002
- Algeria – 150 in 2018.
- Bulgaria
- Cambodia − 8
- China – Produced as Type 59. Retired.
- Czechoslovakia
- Egypt – 300 in 2018.
- Georgia – Used in ground role
- Hungary
- Iraq − 200 prior to the Gulf War. According to Schuster, less than a dozen batteries remained in 1990
- Kazakhstan − 24 delivered to North Korea in 1995
- Libya − 150
- Poland – Withdrawn from service in late 1950s.
- Morocco – 17 in 2018.
- Nicaragua − 18
- North Vietnam
- Romania − 30 as of 2002
- Russia – Used at least until 2008.
- Somalia – 24 in 1989.
- Soviet Union
- Sudan − 10

=== Non-state ===
- Artsakh − Seized by Azerbaijan after the 2023 Azerbaijani offensive in Nagorno-Karabakh
- Hezbollah − Supplied by Syria
- Transnistria − Used as a howitzer
