= Main Agency of Automobiles and Tanks of the Ministry of Defense of the Russian Federation =

- Russian: Главное автобронетанковое управление Министерства обороны Российской Федерации
- Great emblem
- Active: 1929–present
- Country: Russia
- Branch: Army
- Type: Military administration
- Role: Armoured warfare

Commanders
- Current commander: Lieutenant General Alexander Shestakov

Insignia
- Sleeve patch

The Main Automotive-Armoured Directorate of the Ministry of Defence of the Russian Federation (Russian: Главное автобронетанковое управление МО РФ, romanized: Glavnoye Avtobronetankovoye Upravleniye MO RF, abbr. GABTU; another translation: Main Directorate of Armoured Forces) is a department of the Russian Ministry of Defence which is subordinated to the Chief of Armaments and Munitions of the Armed Forces, vice-minister of defense (nachal'nik vooruzheniya VS RF – zamestitel' Ministra oborony RF).

In January 1943, the Main Automobile Directorate (GAU) of the Red Army was formed.

In January 1946, the Main Automobile Directorate of the Red Army was transformed into the Automobile Directorate of the Armed Forces of the USSR.

In 1949, on the basis of the Automotive Directorate of the Armed Forces and the Tractor Directorate of the GAU of the Armed Forces, the Main Automotive and Tractor Directorate (GAVTU) was formed.

In 1953, the Main Automotive Directorate was transformed into the Autotractor Directorate (AVTU) of the Ministry of Defence.

In 1961, the Autotractor Directorate was transformed into the Central Autotractor Directorate (TSAVTU) of the Ministry of Defence.

In December 1982, the Central Automobile and Tractor Directorate of the Ministry of Defence was renamed the Main Automobile Directorate (GLAVTU) of the Ministry of Defence.

== Main Armored Directorate ==
In December 1994, the GBTU of the Russian Ministry of Defense and the GLAVTU of the Russian Ministry of Defense were reorganized into the Main Armored Directorate of the Ministry of Defense of the Russian Federation (GABTU of the Russian Ministry of Defense). Today it is the main developer of military-technical policy in the field of military vehicles and armored weapons and equipment. It is also the main customer and supplier of armored and automotive equipment to the troops.

The T-80 performed so poorly that after the First Chechen War that General-Lieutenant A. Galkin, the head of the Main Armour Directorate, convinced the Minister of Defence to never again procure tanks with gas-turbine engines.

On November 22, 2019, the Main Armored Directorate was awarded the Diploma of the Supreme Commander-in-Chief of the Armed Forces of the Russian Federation.

== Heads of the Main Armored Directorate ==
- 1992–1996 — Aleksandr Aleksandrovich Galkin – colonel general (ru:Галкин, Александр Александрович (генерал))
- 1996–2004 — Sergey Aleksandrovich Mayev – colonel general
- 2004–2007 — Vladislav Aleksandrovich Polonsky – colonel general, General Major Vladislav Polonskiy was identified by Krasnaya Zvezda on September 14, 2004.
- 2007–2009 — Nikolay Fyodorovich Yershov – lieutenant general
- 2009–2019 — Aleksandr Aleksandrovich Shevchenko – Major General.
- 2019–2021 — Sergey Vladimirovich Bibik – Major General
- 2022–present — Aleksandr Anatolyevich Shestakov – Lieutenant General

== Storage sites ==
- 22nd Central Tank Reserve Base, Military Unit Number 42713, 157001, Buy, Kostroma Oblast, (also "Bui")
- 91st Central Base for Reserve of Automotive Vehicles: Located in Kamensk-Shakhtinsky, Rostov Oblast
- 103rd Central Tank Reserve Base (Military Unit 42689): Located in Shilovo, Novosibirsk Oblast
- 104th Central Tank Reserve Base (Military Unit 42841): Located in Aleysk, Altai Krai
- 111th Central Tank Reserve Base (Military Unit 42857): Located in Bui, Kostroma Oblast
- 187th Central Tank Reserve Base: Located in Nizhneudinsk, Irkutsk Oblast
- 245th Central Tank Reserve Base: Location in Central/Western Russia
- 349th Central Tank Reserve Base: Located in Topchikha (or Krasnoyarsk), Altai Krai
- 1047th Central Tank Reserve Base: Located in Ulan-Ude, Buryatia
- 1295th Central Tank Reserve Base: Located in Arsenyev, Primorsky Krai
- 1311th Central Base for Storage and Repair: Located in Verkhnyaya Pyshma, Sverdlovsk Oblast (V/Ch 42716)
- 2544th Central Tank Reserve Base: Located in Kozulka, Krasnoyarsk Krai
- 3018th Central Tank Reserve Base (Military Unit Number 75485) (624852, Kamyshlov, Sverdlovsk Oblast)
- 7024th Central Tank Reserve Base: Located near the Ukrainian border / Southern Russia

== Object numbers ==
GABTU is responsible for assignment of object (Russian: Объект) numbers to almost all the tanks and other combat vehicles entering service in the Armed Forces of the Russian Federation. Объект is often transliterated as objekt, obyekt, ob'yekt, obyect, obiekt, etc. These names are sometimes referred to incorrectly as "industry designation" or "factory names".

The initial digit corresponds to the design bureau.

1–99	Gorky Automobile Factory (GAZ)
100–199	Ural Railway Car Building Factory (Uralvagonzavod plant №183)
201–299	Leningrad Kirov Plant (LKZ)
300–349	Ural Plant of Transport Engineering (UZTM)
400–499	Malyshev Factory (HZTM)
500	Omsktransmash (plant №174)
501–549	Rubtsovsk Engineering Works
550–599	Mytishchi Machine Building Factory (MMZ)
600–699	Kurgan Engineering Factory (KMZ)
700–799	Chelyabinsk Kirov (Tractor) Plant (ChKZ, ChTZ)
800–849	Various
850–899	Moscow Automobile Factory (ZIS, ZIL)
900–999	Stalingrad (Volgograd) Tractor Factory (STZ, VgTZ)
1000–1050	Kutaisi Automotive Factory (KAZ)

=== List ===
Object	Vehicle	Type	Year	Notes
010	MT-LBu	Armoured transporter		
019		Infantry fighting vehicle		Experimental wheeled IFV
101	SU-101	Self propelled gun	1944	Experimental (Uralmash-1), 100 mm D10S casemate based on T-44 hull
102	SU-102	Self propelled gun	1945	Experimental (Uralmash-1), 100 mm D10S up-armored casemate based on T-44 hull
105	SU-100P	Self propelled gun	1949	Experimental, rear mounted 100 mm D-10S
105M	SU-100PM	Self propelled gun	1958	Experimental, modernization of SU-100P with 100 mm D-50
108	SU-152G	Self propelled gun	1949	Experimental, with 152 mm D-1
110	PT-76	Light tank	1961	740 modified by UZTM with PAZ NBC protection system
111	T-111	Light tank	1939	Known as T-46-5, designed and built by OKMO prior to GABTU standardization.
112	BTR-112	Armoured personnel carrier	1949	Armoured personnel carrier variant of 105
115	T-115	Medium tank	1938	Prospective breakthrough tank design based on T-28, never built
116	T-116	Light tank	1932	8 ton experimental, never built. Designed by OKMO prior to GABTU standardization.
116	SU-152P	Self propelled gun		Experimental, with 152 mm M-53
117	SPU-117	Self propelled searchlight		
118	GMZ-1	Minelayer based on the SU-100P chassis.		
118-2	GMZ-2	Minelayer based on the SU-100P chassis.		
119	ZSU-37-2 Yenisei	Self propelled anti aircraft gun	1960	Experimental, 2A1 SPAAG with 2A12 (AZP-37) consisting of two 2A11 (500P) 37 mm cannons.
120	SU-152 "Taran"	Tank destroyer	1965	Experimental, enclosed tank destroyer with 152 mm M-53
121	2K9 "Shmel'"	Self propelled launch platform	1959	Experimental, based on the 740 with 2P8 launcher for 3M1 "Onega" missile
122	2K9 "Shmel'"	Self propelled launch platform	1959	Experimental, based on the 740 with 2P9 loading mechanism for 3M1 "Onega" missile
123	2K11 Krug	Self propelled TEL	1959	Transporter-Erector-Launcher 2P24, based on GM-123 tracked chassis
124	1S32	Self propelled TADS	1959	Target Acquisition and Designation System for 2K11 Krug anti-aircraft missile system
125		Light tank		
126	T-50	Light tank	1941	
135	T-34-85	Medium tank	1943	
136	T-44	Medium tank	1944	
137-1	T-54-1	Main battle tank	1946	M1946
137G	T-54A	Main battle tank		
137G2	T-54B	Main battle tank		
137G2K	T-54BK	Main battle tank		
137GK	T-54AK	Main battle tank		Command version
137GM	T-54AM	Main battle tank		137G modernization
137GMK	T-54AMK	Main battle tank		137GM command version
137K	T-54K	Main battle tank		137-3 command version
137M	T-54M	Main battle tank		137-1, 137-2, 137-3 modernization
137MK	T-54MK	Main battle tank		137M command version
137R	T-54-2	Main battle tank	1949	M1949
137Sh	T-54-3	Main battle tank	1951	M1951
138	SU-100	Tank destroyer	1944	
139	T-54M	Main battle tank		Accepted for service, but not produced
140		Main battle tank	1954	Accepted for service, but not produced
141		Main battle tank	1953	Modernization of the Object 137
142		Main battle tank	1954	Variant of the 140 but with a chassis similar to that of Object 155, accepted for service, but not produced
148	T-14	Main battle tank	2015	
149	T-15	Infantry fighting vehicle	2015	
150	IT-1	Missile tank	1968	Missile armed
155	T-55	Main battle tank		
155A	T-55A	Main battle tank		
155AD-1	T-55AD-1	Main battle tank	1983	155A with Drozd and V-46-5M engine
155AD	T-55AD	Main battle tank	1983	155A with Drozd
155AK	T-55AK	Main battle tank		155A command version
155K	T-55K	Main battle tank		155 command version
155M	T-55M	Main battle tank	1984	
165	T-62A	Main battle tank	1959	
165K		Main battle tank		Command version of the 165
165P		Main battle tank		Variant of the 165 with increased radiation protection
166	T-62	Main battle tank	1959	Based on the 165 but unlike the 165 it was armed with the smooth-bore U-5TS
166D	T-62D	Main battle tank	1983	T-62 with add-on armor and improved mine protection developed in the early 1980s.
166K	T-62K	Main battle tank	1964	Command version of 166
166P	T-62P	Main battle tank		Variant of the 166 with increased radiation protection
166KN	T-62K	Main battle tank	1964	166 with TNA-2 Navigational Aid
166M-1	T-62M-1	Main battle tank		166M with different engine
166M	T-62M	Main battle tank	1983	166 modernization
166M1-1	T-62M1-1	Main battle tank		166M-1 without missile
166M1-2-1	T-62M1-2-1	Main battle tank		166M-1 without missile or armor upgrade
166M1-2	T-62M1-2	Main battle tank		166M without missile or armor upgrade
166M1	T-62M1	Main battle tank		166M without missile
166M1V-1	T-62M1V-1	Main battle tank		166M1-1 with K-1 ERA
166M1V	T-62M1V	Main battle tank		166M1 with K-1 ERA
166MD-1	T-62MD-1	Main battle tank	1983	166M-1 with Drozd
166MD	T-62MD	Main battle tank	1983	166M with Drozd
166MK-1	T-62MK-1	Main battle tank		166M-1 command version
166MK	T-62MK	Main battle tank		166M command version
166MV-1	T-62MV-1	Main battle tank	1985	166M-1 with K-1 ERA
166MV	T-62MV	Main battle tank	1985	166M with K-1 ERA
167		Main battle tank	1963	Modernization of the 166
167TU		Main battle tank		167 variant with a new turbine engine
172	T-72	Main battle tank	1968	experimental pre-production sample with a B-45K engine and a mass of 39 tons.
172-2M	T-72	Main battle tank	1972	experienced pre-production sample with a more powerful B-46F engine and a mass of 42 tons.
184-1	T-72B1	Main battle tank	1985 (service)	T-72B without the Svir GLATGM system.
187		Main battle tank		Prototypes developed under the « Improvement-88 » program.
188	T-90	Main battle tank	1992 (service)	Tank developed under the « Improvement T-72B » program.
188M	T-90M	Main battle tank	2020 (service)	
195	T-95	Main battle tank	1991-2010 (development)	Tank developed under the « Improvement-88 » program.
199	BMPT	Tank support fighting vehicle	1995	
211		Light tank		126 (T-50) with changed hull
212		Self propelled gun	1941	
217	PPG tankette	Tankette	1941	Single prototype
219	T-80	Main battle tank	1976	
219A	Improved T-80 (during development) T-80U-1 (service designation) || Main battle tank || 1976 (development) 1985 (service)	Improved T-80 using a new turret with new FCS, gun and engine.		
219AS	T-80U	Main battle tank	1985 (service)	Improved version of the 219A.
219E		Main battle tank		219R with Arena
219R	T-80B	Main battle tank	1978 (service)	Improved version of the T-80 with a new turret, FCS and the Kobra GLATGM system.
220	KV-220	Heavy tank	1941	Single prototype with an 85 mm gun
221	KV-221	Heavy tank	1941	Single prototype
222	KV-222	Heavy tank	1941	Single prototype
223	KV-3	Heavy tank	1941	Single prototype
224	KV-4	Super heavy tank		Never built
225	KV-5	Heavy tank		Cancelled
226	KV-6	Heavy tank	1941	Flamethrower tank, single prototype
227	KV-7	Self propelled gun	1941	Single prototype
228	KV-8	Heavy tank		Flamethrower tank
229	KV-9	Heavy tank	1941	Prototype
230	KV-10	Heavy tank	1942	Single prototype. Also known as KV-1K. A KV-1S with 4 rocket launchers on the back of the hull
232	KV-12	Heavy tank		Experimental chemical tank
233	KV-13	Medium tank		Prototype
234	KV-234	Heavy tank		Also known as the "Super KV-2". A failed attempt to place a 203mm gun into a fully rotating turret on the chassis of the KV-1
236	SU-152	Self propelled gun	1943	Initially KV-14
237	IS-1	Heavy tank	1943	Also known as IS-85
239	KV-85	Heavy tank	1943	
240	IS-2	Heavy tank	1943	
241	ISU-152	Self propelled gun	1943	M1943
241K	ISU-152K	Self propelled gun	1953	
241M	ISU-152M	Self propelled gun	1959	
242	ISU-122	Self propelled gun	1944	
243	ISU-122BM	Self propelled gun		
244		Heavy tank	1944	240 variant
245	IS-4	Heavy tank		240 variant
246	ISU-152BM	Self propelled gun	1944	241 variant. Also known as ISU-152BM-1 & ISU152-1
247	ISU-152-2	Self propelled gun	1944	
248	IS-5	Heavy tank		
249	ISU-122S	Self propelled gun		
250	ISU-130	Self propelled gun		
252	IS-6	Heavy tank		Experimental, armed with 122mm D-30(unrelated to the 2A18)
253	IS-6	Heavy tank		252 variant, electro-mechanical transmission and 240 chassis
254		Heavy tank		Planned
255		Heavy tank		Planned
256		Heavy tank		Planned
257		Heavy tank		Planned
258		Heavy tank	1945	Planned
259		Heavy tank	1945	Planned
260	IS-7	Heavy tank	1945	
261		Heavy tank	1945	Planned, designation was later reused
261		Self propelled gun	1947	Self propelled gun based on the 260. It had a forward fighting closed compartment and was armed with the 152mm M-31 with a muzzle velocity 880 m/s
262		Self propelled gun	1947	Variant of the 261 SPG, both of which were based on the 260. It had a rear fighting compartment and was armed with the 152mm M-48 with a muzzle velocity of 1000 m/s
263		Self propelled gun	1948	Direct fire SPG based on the 260. It was armed with the 130mm S-70A.
268		Tank destroyer		Prototype SPG on the 730 (T-10) chassis. Armed with the 152mm M-64. One built.
271		Self propelled gun		
272	T-10M	Heavy tank		Leningrad-Built
272K	T-10MK	Heavy tank	1959	272 command version
273		Self propelled gun		
277	-	Heavy tank	1958	
279	-	Heavy tank	1957	Heavy tank prototype with an unconventional hull shape and quadruple-track system. Four built.
282		Main battle tank	1961	Missile armed
287		Main battle tank		Missile armed (Taifun)
288		Main battle tank		T-80 engine prototype
292		Main battle tank	1990	Prototype MBT armed with a 152mm smoothbore. One built.
317	2S19 Msta	Self propelled artillery	1989	
327	Self propelled artillery	1987		
416	SU-100M	Medium tank	1951	Medium tank prototype with a rear-mounted turret. It was later re-designated as an SPG and given the name SU-100M.
430		Main battle tank	1952	Medium tank that would serve as the basis of the 432, and thus, the T-64
432	T-64	Main battle tank	1963 (production) 1966 (service)	Initial production run of the T-64, armed with the 115mm D-68.
434	T-64A	Main battle tank	1969 (production) 1973 (service)	Improved version of the T-64
435		Main battle tank	1960	Modernization of the 430. Unlike the 430, it was armed with the 115mm U-5TS
436		Main Battle tank	1965	Variant of the 432 with a new engine
437	T-64A	Main battle tank		Variant of the 432 with a new engine
446	T-64BK	Main battle tank		Command version of the T-64B
447A	T-64B	Main battle tank	1976 (service)	Improved version of the T-64A. New 1A33 FCS, Kobra GLATGM system and 2A46 gun.
450	T-74	Main battle tank		Prototype
476	T-64AM and T-64BM	Main battle tank	1976 (development) 1983 (service)	Improved version of the T-64A and T-64B with a new turret and 6TD-1 engine.
477	"Molot"	Main battle tank	1987	Prototype
478B	T-80UD	Main battle tank		"Bereza"
481	OT-54	Main battle tank		Flamethrower variant
482	OT-55	Main battle tank		Flamethrower variant
483		Main battle tank		Flamethrower variant, not produced
490	"Poplar"	experimental main battle tank		
490A	"Rebel"	experimental main battle tank		
500	ZSU-57-2	Anti Aircraft		
600	IT-122		1949	Also SU-122-54. Tank destroyer based on 137 hull
630	T-80BK	Main battle tank		Command version of the T-80B
630A	T-80UK	Main battle tank	1995 (service)	Command version of the T-80U
634	TOS-1	Self propelled rocket launcher	1988	
640	"Black Eagle"	Main battle tank		
675	BMP-2	Infantry fighting vehicle	1980's	
685		Light tank	1975	Amphibious airborne light tank prototype, armed with the 100mm 2A48. One built.
688	BMP-3	Infantry combat vehicle		
701-2	IS-4	Heavy tank		Tested with 122mm D-25T, 100mm S-34-II, 122mm S-34-I
701-5	IS-4	Heavy tank		Prototype IS-4
701-6	IS-4	Heavy tank	1949	Prototype IS-4
703	IS-3	Heavy tank	1945	240 variant
704		Self propelled gun	1945	Prototype SPG on the chassis of the Kirovets-1, the first IS-3 prototype. Armed with the 152mm ML-20SM. One built.
705		Heavy tank	1945	
705A		Heavy tank	1948	Heavy tank proposal based on the 705 – it was rear turreted and weighed 100 tons.
715		Self propelled gun	1947	SPG based on the 701(IS-4). It was armed with a high power 152mm gun
717		Bridge layer	1947	Bridge layer based on the 701(IS-4)
730	T-10	Heavy tank	1949	
730A	T-10A	Heavy tank		
730B	T-10B	Heavy tank	1957	
730BK	T-10BK	Heavy tank		730B command version
734	T-10M	Heavy tank		Chelyabinsk built
740	PT-76	Light tank	1949	Amphibious
757		Main battle tank		Missile armed
764		Infantry fighting vehicle		BMP-1 prototype competitor
765	BMP-1	Infantry fighting vehicle	1966	
770	-	Heavy tank	1955	One prototype
770-K				Command Variant of the 770
775		Main battle tank	1962	Missile armed
777		Heavy tank	1953	Planned
780		Main battle tank	1971	Prototype
785		Main Battle tank	1978	Prototype
906	PT-85	Light tank		Intended to be a successor of the 740; Amphibious
907	PT-76M	Light tank		Planned, designation was later reused
914		Infantry fighting vehicle		BMD-1 prototype, former BMP-1 competitor
915	BMD-1	Infantry fighting vehicle	1969	
916	BMD-2	Infantry fighting vehicle	1985	
925	BTR-D	Infantry fighting vehicle	1975	
934		Light tank	1962	Prototype; Amphibious
950	BMD-3	Infantry fighting vehicle	1990	
952	2S25 Sprut-SD	Light tank		
955	BTR-MD	Infantry fighting vehicle		
958	RKhM-5	Infantry fighting vehicle		Chemical reconnaissance
960	BMD-4	Infantry fighting vehicle		
1200		Infantry fighting vehicle		Wheeled BMP-1

== See also ==
- GRAU
- List of Soviet tank factories
