= SU-100P =

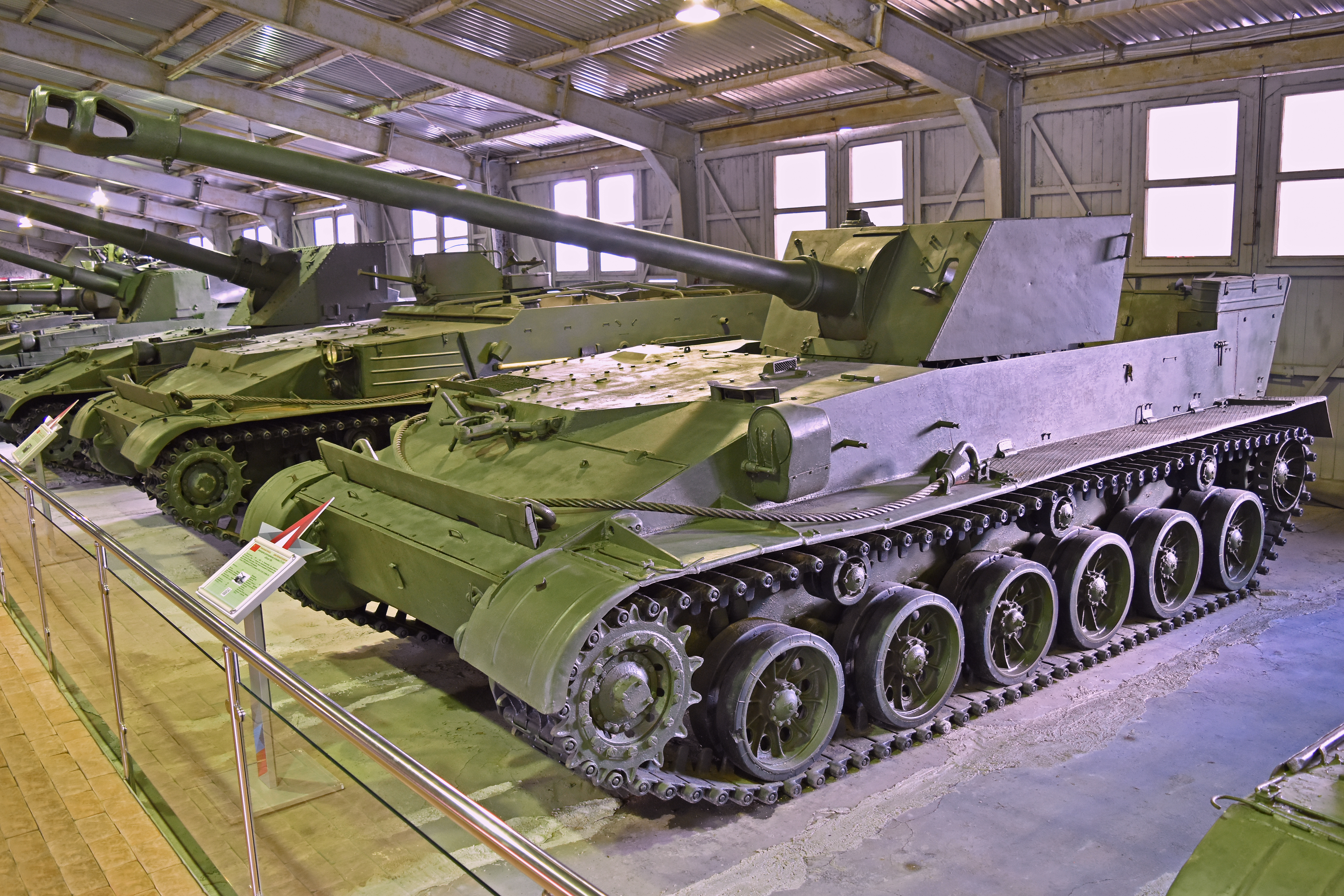
- SU-100P in the Kubinka Tank Museum
- Type: Self-propelled howitzer
- Place of origin: Soviet Union

Production history
- Designer: Lev Gorlitsky
- Designed: 1947–1950
- Produced: 1949
- No. built: 1 (prototype)

Specifications
- Mass: 21.6 t (21.3 long tons; 23.8 short tons)
- Length: 7.8m
- Width: 3.1m
- Height: 2.262m
- Crew: 4
- Caliber: 100mm (3.93 in)
- Barrels: 1
- Action: breech loaded
- Elevation: -5 to 37 degrees
- Traverse: -143 degrees to 143 degrees
- Rate of fire: 4 – 6 rounds per minute
- Muzzle velocity: ~895 metres per second (2,940 ft/s)
- Sights: Telescopic and Panoramic sights
- Main armament: 100 mm D-50/D-10 cannon
- Engine: V-105 (V-54-105) 12-cylinder, four-stroke diesel engine 400 horsepower (300 kW)
- Operational range: 300km on highway
- Maximum speed: 65 kilometres per hour (40 mph)

The SU-100P (Russian: СУ-100П, GABTU index "Object 105") is a Soviet experimental 100-mm self-propelled howitzer, and is designed by OKB-3 of the heavy machine construction division of Uralmash. The main designer of the SU-100P is Lev Gorlitsky. The SU-100P was intended to suppress and destroy enemy firing positions, engage enemy armored vehicles, as well as area denial, in addition to conducting counter-battery tasks. It was intended to be the main competitor of the Object 416.

== History ==
After the Second World War in 1945, the USSR started to make plans for a new anti-tank and assault gun to defeat enemy armored vehicles with direct fire. At that time, Europe and the United States were developing artillery that are able to fire from closed positions. Gradually, these artillery began to replace the towed guns in their roles. The importance of self-propelled guns became apparent in local conflicts. Despite the artillery then in use by the USSR being equipped with the necessary sighting adaptations for firing from closed positions, the maximum barrel elevation of most artillery was limited to only 15-20 degrees. This significantly decreased the performance of self-propelled artillery, especially when compared with the towed guns.

Utilizing experience gained during the Eastern Front, OKB-3 under L. I. Gorlitsky prepared two projects for the new artillery. After Decree No. 2252-935 of the USSR was issued on 22 June 1948, OKB-3 commenced the designing of the SU-100P in compliance with the decree.

The designing of the SU-100P was mainly handled by OKB-3, while the gun, the D-50/D-10 was developed separately by OKB-9. After development of the prototype, the SU-100P, together with the SU-152G, underwent factory testing during the fall of 1948. The prototype had a number of problems, unreliability of the lifting mechanism and insufficient stability of self-propelled guns when firing.

In October 1949, the SU-100P, together with the SU-152G and the SU-152P took part in state trials, which revealed flaws in the chassis of the SU-100P. Improvements of the chassis and elimination of identified flaws continued until June 1955, after which the SU-100P and the SU-152G were accepted into service by the Soviet Army. However, most of the work on self-propelled guns was canceled by Khrushchev in 1955, and the SU-100P never saw mass production.

== Design description ==
=== Hull and turret ===
The SU-100P has an open turret mounted on the hull. In bad weather conditions, the combat compartment could be covered with a canopy. The hull is divided into 3 compartments: the power compartment, the driving compartment and the combat compartment. The engine and the transmissions were housed in the front right part of the vehicle.The front left part was the driving compartment. The middle of the vehicle was the combat compartment, and a box-shaped turret houses the gun. The entire vehicle needed a crew of 4 to operate. The armor for the hull was 25 mm thick (0.98 in), while the turret had 15 mm-thick (0.59 in) armor.

=== Armament ===
The main armament of the SU-100P was the D-50/D-10 100-mm gun developed by a team led by F.F. Petrov in the design bureau of Plant No. 9 in 1947. The SU-100P is capable of firing Armor-Piercing and High-Explosive Fragmentation shells.The vehicle can hold 50 shells.The gun had a traverse range of 143 degrees to either the left or the right, and the maximum elevation range was from -4 to +37 degrees. The ZIS-3 panoramic sight was used when firing from closed position while the OP-2 telescopic sight was used to aim the gun during direct firing.

=== Communications ===
The SU-100P was equipped with a 10 RT-26 radio for external communications. The crew communicated via the TPU-47-3 intercom as well as light signaling.

=== Engine and transmission ===
The SU-100P is powered by a V-105 (V-54-105) V12 4-stroke diesel engine that can output 400 hp (300 kW). It is modified from a V-54 engine while having the following adjustments:

- The spring corrector of the NK-10 pump was removed;
- The outlet nozzles, intake manifold, fan drive and the water pump cover was modified;
- The "Kimaf-STZ" oil filter was installed on a separate bracket;
- A G-74 3 kW generator was installed;
- The motor resource was increased;
- The radiator grille was changed for better cooling efficiency.

=== Chassis ===
The chassis of the SU-100P had 6 pairs of road wheels and three pairs of support rollers, a pair of drive wheels and a pair of guide wheels.

== Variants ==
- SU-152G (Obj 108)- Self-propelled gun based on the chassis of the SU-100P and armed with a 152mm D-50/D-1 howitzer.
- BTR-112 (Obj 112)- Armoured Personnel Carrier based on the SU-100P chassis.
- SU-152P (Obj 116)- Self-propelled gun based on the chassis of the SU-100P and armed with a 152mm M-53 cannon.
- SPU-117 (Obj 117)- A searchlight mounted on a modified SU-100P chassis to support other armored vehicles during night combat.
- GMZ-1 (Obj 118)- Minelayer based on the SU-100P chassis.
- GMZ-2 (Obj 118-2)- Minelayer based on the SU-100P chassis.
- ZSU-37-2 Yenisei self-propelled anti-aircraft gun (Obj 119)- Self-propelled anti-aircraft gun based on the SU-100P chassis.
- SU-152 "Taran" (Obj 120)- Experimental self-propelled gun.
- 2K11 Krug anti-aircraft missile system (Obj 123)- 2K11 Krug anti-aircraft missile system mounted on a SU-100P chassis.
- 1S32 (Obj 124)- Missile guidance system for the 2K11 Krug anti-aircraft missile system.
- 2K10 Ladoga (Obj 125)- Tactical ballistic missile mounted on a SU-100P chassis.
- 2K10 Ladoga (Obj 126)- Tactical ballistic missile mounted on a SU-100P chassis.
- Object 127 (Obj 127)- Special combat vehicle designed to clear accumulations of tanks and other enemy targets (existed only in blueprints).
- Object 130 (Obj 130)- Self-propelled anti-aircraft gun (existed only in blueprints).
- 2S3 Akatsiya (Obj 303)- In the late 1960s, the SU-100P chassis formed the basis for the 2SZ Akatsiya self-propelled howitzer.
- 2S4 Tyulpan (Obj 305)- Heavy self-propelled mortar.
- Object 306 (Obj 306)- Multi-purpose conveyor tractor.
- 2S5 "Hyacinth-S" (Obj 307)- Self-propelled gun.
- Buk-M1-2 SAM system 9S18M1-1 Tube Arm target acquisition radar (Obj 308)- Target acquisition radar for the Buk missile system.
- 1K17 Szhatie (Obj 312)- Self-propelled laser system for counteracting enemy optical-electronic devices.
- 2S11 "Hyacinth-SK" (Obj 313)- Modified version of 2S5 "Hyacinth-S" self-propelled gun.
- GMZ-3 (Obj 318)- Minelayer.
- Object 319 (Obj 319)

== Surviving examples ==
- Russia:
  - Kubinka: The single experimental prototype is held on display at the Kubinka Tank Museum.
