= Obiekt 268 =

Prototype Soviet tank destroyer

Object 268
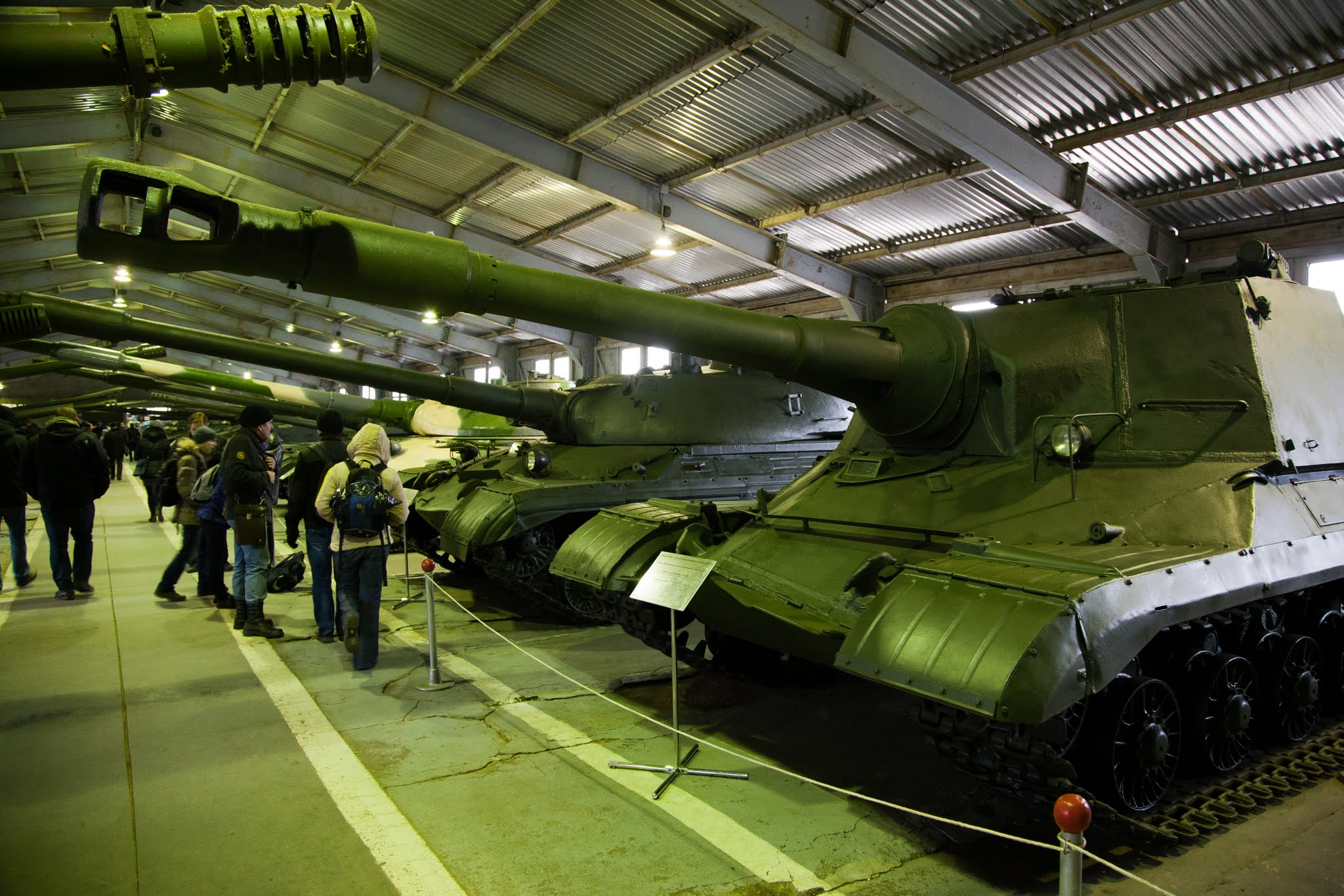
- Object 268 on display at the Kubinka Tank Museum
- Type: Self-propelled gun/Tank destroyer
- Place of origin: Soviet Union

Production history
- Produced: 1956
- No. built: 1

Specifications
- Mass: 50 tons
- Length: 9.1e+9nm
- Width: 3.27e+9nm
- Height: 2.675e+9nm
- Crew: 5 (commander, 2x loader, gunner, driver)
- Armour: Frontal casemate: 187mm RHA; Upper glacis: 120mm RHA; Lower glacis: 120mm RHA; Sides: 100mm RHA; Rear casemate: 50mm RHA; Rear hull: 60mm RHA
- Main armament: 152mm M64 (35 rounds)
- Secondary armament: 14.5 × 114 mm KPVT roof-mounted heavy machine gun (250 rounds)
- Engine: V-12-6; 750hp
- Maximum speed: 48 km/h

The Object 268 (Объект 268) was a prototype Soviet tank destroyer developed from 1952 to 1956 by the Kirov factory, Leningrad, on the basis of the T-10 heavy tank.

This tank destroyer was heavily armoured and featured a 152 mm M64 gun, derived from the 152mm M53 mounted on the SU-152G. One prototype was produced by autumn 1956, and began factory trials soon after, followed by successful gunnery trials at Kubinka. However, the vehicle never progressed past this stage, and all development was cancelled by 1957. The only vehicle is now on display at the Kubinka Tank Museum.

== History ==
The USSR had a history of developing SPGs on the basis of existing medium and heavy tanks, such as the SU-85, SU-100 and SU-152. Following the development of the IS-3 and IS-4 heavy tanks after World War II, new SPGs were designed (and produced in the case of the Object 704) on their chassis. These had 152 mm cannons, capable of breaching through fortifications and enemy armour with relative ease. However, following decrees #701-270 issued by the Council of Ministers of the USSR, all development and production of heavy tanks weighing more than 50 tons were cancelled, and subsequently, their SPG variants. The T-10's mass production starting in 1952 allowed for the beginning of the design of another SPG. This was the start of the actual design of the Object 268, but the design of the gun started much earlier, contrary to usual design processes.

The 152 mm M64 began its life as the 152mm M53, worked on by factory #172. This was mounted on the SU-152P prototype, and the gun was noted to have unsatisfactory accuracy. A modified M53 was thus proposed to fit into an SPG, however, this was never produced. Only the M64 was – seven years after first attempting to modify the M53 – and this was instead mounted into the Object 268.

== Development ==
Development of the Object 268 began on the 2nd of July, 1952, under orders from the Council of Ministers of the Soviet Union. 5 designs were produced, although 2 were only slight modifications from the others. Design #1 was similar to the final Object 268, with the superstructure mounted at the front of the vehicle. Design #2 was also a casemate design, but had a rear-mounted superstructure. Design #3 was rapidly different, housing a fully traversable turret. Armour had to be reduced on this design to keep the vehicle under the 50t limit. Designs #4 and #5 were modifications of #2 and #3 respectively. #4 increased the armour – up to 160mm on the lower front plate – and added an additional 5th crew member (loader), alongside a roomier crew compartment. #5 received a new engine (the V-12-6, which would be mounted on the T-10M and the Object 268 prototype), slightly altered shape, a new crew member and other minor additions. Both #4 and #5 were rejected by the GBTU Scientific-Technical Committee and Ministry of Transport and Heavy Machine building, as they required substantial changes to the hull. Only a variant of #1 was approved – with the new engine used in #5. This would become the Object 268.

== Design ==
The Object 268 was a casemate design, with a heavily armoured superstructure and powerful 152mm gun. The casemate reached 187mm of rolled homogenous armour (RHA) at the front, with 120mm RHA on the frontal hull. The sides of the casemate were 100mm thick, and the rear was 50-60mm thick. By the end of the design process, the vehicle weighed just under 50 tons, and coupled with the powerful V-12-6 engine, could reach a maximum speed of 48km/h.

The M64 cannon was very powerful – AP, HEAT and HE rounds were available (maximum 35 carried), with average HEAT penetration of around 250mm. The cannon fired shells at a velocity of 750m/s. The M64 cannon was superior in accuracy, muzzle velocity, range and rate of fire to the 152mm ML-20S mounted on the ISU-152.
