= List of Soviet tank factories =

This is a list of the former Soviet tank factories. Today most of them are located in the Russian Federation, while only the Malyshev Factory is located in Ukraine.

This list includes the heavy steel manufacturing plants where main production and assembly of medium and heavy armoured vehicles took place, initiated first in the late 1920s as a prerequisite for the developing Red Army doctrine that called for large tank forces. It does not list the related facilities which fabricated components for them, the many lighter automotive industries which built light tracked vehicles and armoured cars, nor the armoured vehicle repair and overhaul plants.

Keeping track of the tank factories can be difficult. Many were based on pre-Soviet imperial Russian shipbuilding or locomotive factories, and may have changed names more than once. The majority were evacuated and consolidated in the Urals in the fall of 1941, shortly after the disastrous German invasion of June 22. After World War II, some remained in their new location, others were moved back or re-established at other factories. Most were also known by their designation numbers as well as honorific names.

English translations of the factory names can also be confusing. In various sources, the Russian "завод" is translated either as "factory", "plant", "works", or simply transliterated as "zavod".

== List ==
Initial Location	Kharkov (Kharkiv)	Kharkov (Kharkiv)	Nizhny Tagil	Leningrad (St Petersburg)	Leningrad (St Petersburg)	Leningrad (St Petersburg)	Chelyabinsk	Stalingrad (later Volgograd)	Gorky (Nizhny Novgorod)	Sverdlovsk (Yekaterinburg)
Pre-Soviet name		Kharkov Locomotive Factory (KhPZ), 1895			Treasury iron foundry, 1801; Putilov Factory, 1868				Nizhny Novgorod Machine Factory, 1849	
Early Soviet name	Kharkov Diesel Factory	Kharkov Komintern Locomotive Factory, 1928	Dzerzhinsky Ural Railroad Car Factory, Uralvagonzavod, (UVZ or Vagonka), 1936	Factory No. 185 (S.M. Kirov), 1935; originally a part of Bolshevik Factory No. 232	Red Putilovite Plant, 1922 renamed Kirov Plant, 1934	K.E. Voroshilov (Russian), 1932; originally a part of Bolshevik Factory No. 232	Chelyabinsk Tractor Plant (ChTZ), 1933	Dzerzhinsky Stalingrad Tractor Factory (STZ), 1930	Krasnoye Sormovo (Andrei Zhdanov), 1920	Ordzhonikidze Ural Heavy Machine Building Plant (UZTM), 1933
Factory Number	Factory No. 75	Factory No. 183, 1936		Factory No. 185	Factory No. 100 until 1941	Factory No. 174	Factory No. 100, 1941		Factory No. 112	
World War II	Moved to Tankograd in Chelyabinsk, 1941	KhPZ merged with Uralvagonzavod in Nizhny Tagil to form Ural Tank Factory No. 183 (I.V. Stalin), 1941; Became the world's largest tank factory.		Partially moved to Tankograd in Chelyabinsk, 1941	Partially moved to Tankograd in Chelyabinsk, 1941	Moved to Chkalov, 1941; Moved again to Omsk, as Omsk Lenin Factory No. 174, 1942	Chelyabinsk Kirov Factory, unofficially known as Tankograd	Overran in the Battle of Stalingrad, 1942		
Location after World War II	Kharkov, Ukrainian SSR	Nizhny Tagil		St Petersburg (Leningrad)	St Petersburg (Leningrad)	Omsk, 1962	Chelyabinsk	Volgograd (Stalingrad)	Nizhny Novgorod (Gorky)	Yekaterinburg (Sverdlovsk)
After World War II	Restored as Kharkov Diesel Factory No. 75 by partly moving Factory No. 183 back from Nizhny Tagil, 1944-1952; Renamed Malyshev Factory, 1957	Uralvagonzavod, 1984				Switched to engines construction	Chelyabinsk Tractor Plant, 1958	Volgograd Tractor Factory, 1961	Returned to shipbuilding	
Post-Soviet	independent Ukraine, 1991	Uralvagonzavod OAO			Kirov Plant	Omsk Transmash	ChTZ-Uraltrac, 1998	Bankrupt, 2002. Restored as VgTZ, one of the 4 successor companies in 2004.	OAO Zavod "Krasnoye Sormovo", 1994	Uralmash, 1992
Design Bureau	Morozov Design Bureau (KMDB)		OKB-520 Kartsev-Venediktov Design Bureau, 1944	OKMO	SKB-2 (Josef Kotin)	KBTM	Dukhov			
Designed	T-24, BT tanks, T-34, T-44, T-54, T-64, T-80 turret, T-80UD, T-84		T-54A, T-55, T-62, T-72, T-90, T-95 prototype, T-14	T-26, T-35	SMK, KV, IS-2, IS-3 hull, T-10	(SKB-1: T-50); T-80 hull, BTR-T, TOS-1, Black Eagle tank prototype	IS-3 turret		T-34-85 turret	
Built	T-34 engine	T-26, BT tanks, T-28, T-35, T-34	T-34	T-34	KV, T-34, IS	T-26, T-50, T-34	KV, IS, SU-152, ISU-122, ISU-152, T-34, SU-85	T-34	Russkiy Reno, T-34	T-34, SU-85, SU-122, SU-100
Built	T-54/55, T-64, T-80UD, T-84		T-44, T-54/55, T-62, T-72, T-90, T-14		IS-4, T-10, T-80, PT-76	T-10, T-80		PT-76		T-54

== See also ==
- GABTU
- Soviet armored fighting vehicle production during World War II

== Bibliography ==
- Zaloga, Steven J. and James Grandsen (1984). Soviet Tanks and Combat Vehicles of World War Two. London: Arms and Armour Press. ISBN 0-85368-606-8.
