= D-10 tank gun =

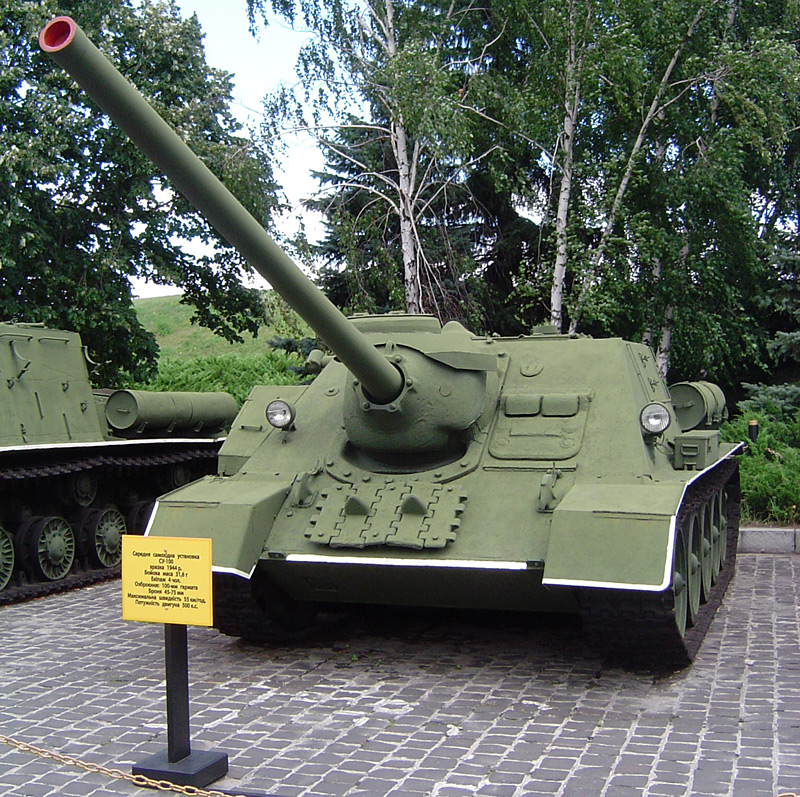
- D-10S gun on an SU-100 tank destroyer
- Type: Rifled tank/antitank gun
- Place of origin: Soviet Union

Service history
- In service: 1944–present
- Wars: see SU-100 and T-54

Production history
- Designer: F. F. Petrov
- Variants: D-10S, D-10T, D-10TG, D-10T2S

Specifications
- Mass: 1,438 kg (3,170 lbs)
- Length: 5.608 m (18 ft 4.8 in)
- Barrel length: 5.35 m (17 ft 7 in) L/53.5
- Shell: Fixed QF 100 × 695 mmR
- Calibre: 100 mm (3.93 in)
- Breech: horizontal sliding wedge (semi-automatic)
- Recoil: hydraulic buffer and hydropneumatic recuperator
- Carriage: vehicle mount
- Elevation: +18°, –3°
- Rate of fire: 4 rounds/min avg 5–6 rounds/min max.
- Muzzle velocity: 895 m/s (3,281 ft/s)
- Maximum firing range: 14,600 m (16,000 yds), or 16,000 m (17,500 yds)

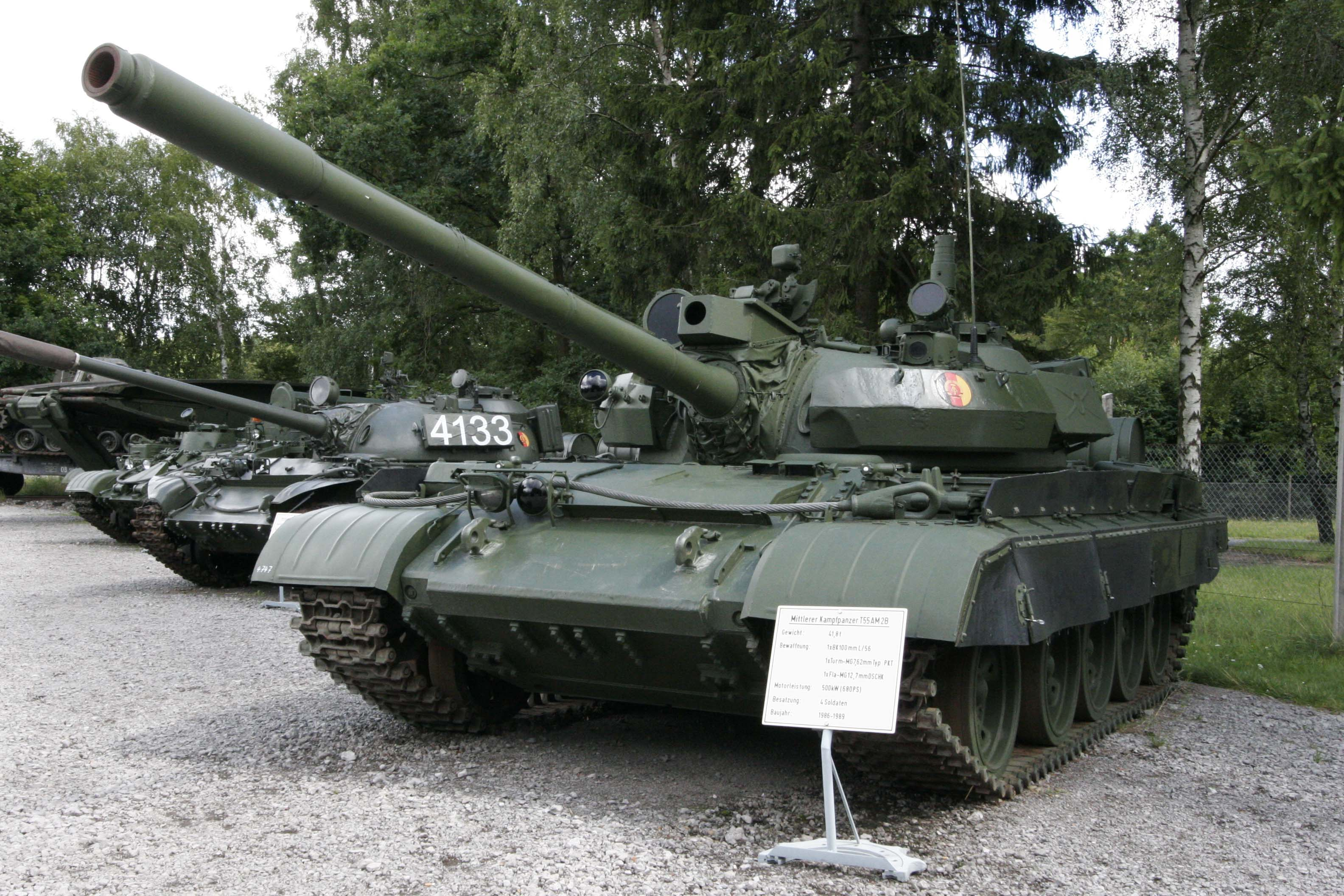
Versions of the D-10 were mounted on new T-54 and T-55 tanks until at least 1979, as well as on Chinese Type 59s. This is a German T-55AM2B.

The D-10 is a Soviet 100 mm tank gun developed in late World War II. It originally equipped the SU-100 tank destroyers and was later selected for the T-55 tank, equipping these as late as 1979. On the T-55 the D-10 continues to be in active service in many countries.

== History ==
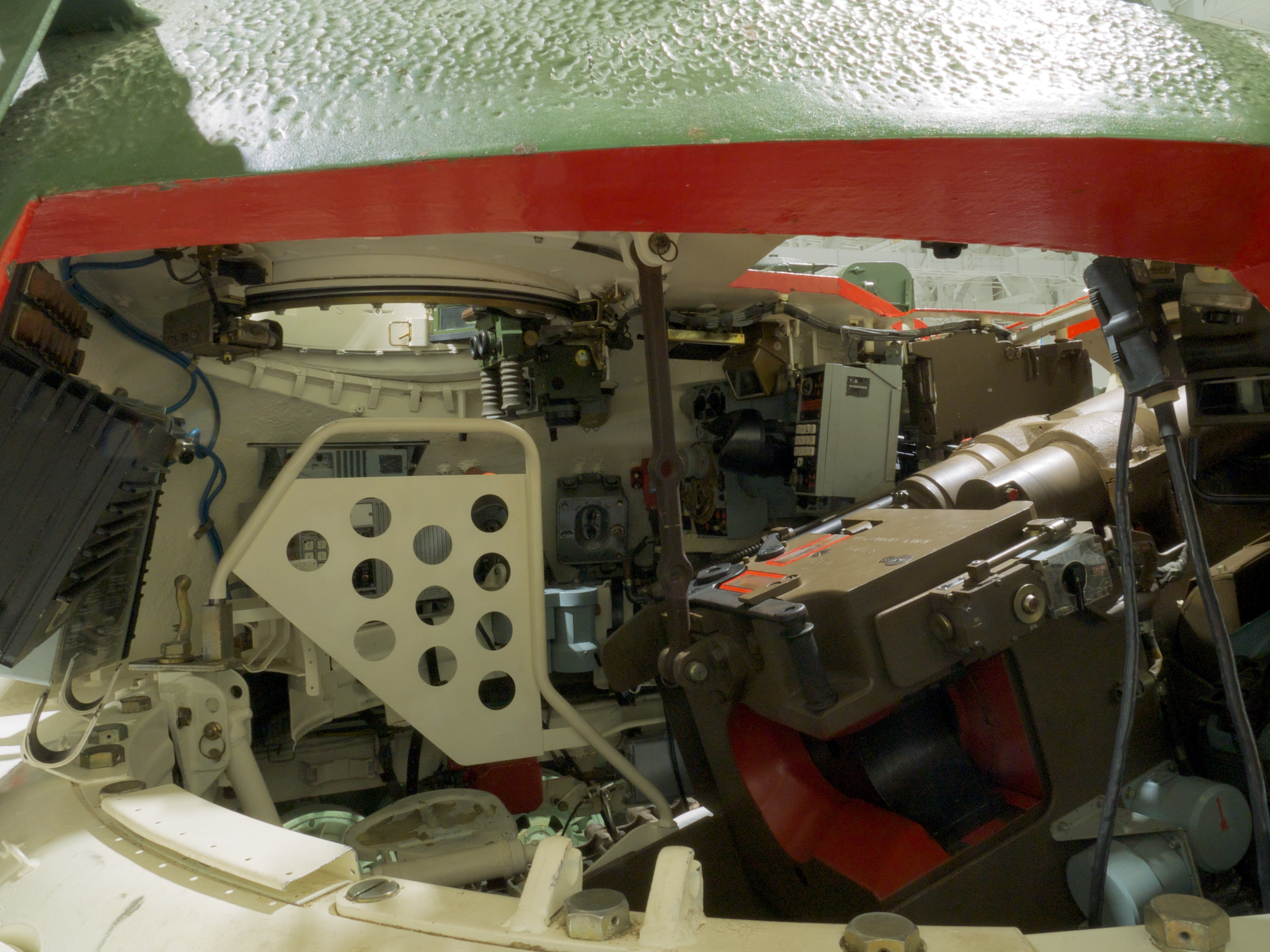
D-10 tank gun in a T-55 tank

At the beginning of 1944, the T-34 tank's F-34 76.2 mm tank gun was replaced by a more powerful 85 mm gun. This rendered the year-old SU-85 tank destroyer effectively obsolescent, since its D-5T 85 mm gun was now also fielded by a more flexible medium tank. F. F. Petrov's Design Bureau at Artillery Factory No. 9 was assigned the task of producing a 100 mm anti-tank gun that could be used on the SU-85 chassis, for the proposed SU-100. To achieve this goal, Petrov's team modified the S-34 naval gun for use in an armoured fighting vehicle.

The D-10 is a high-velocity gun of 100 mm calibre (bore diameter), with a barrel length of 53.5 calibres. A muzzle velocity of 895 m/s gave it good anti-tank performance by late-war standards. With its original ammunition, it could penetrate about 164 mm of steel armor plate at 1,000 m, which made it superior to the German 75 mm KwK 42 mounted on the Panther tank as well as the Tiger I's 88 mm KwK 36 gun. Testing against Panther tanks at Kubinka showed the D-10T could penetrate the Panther's glacis up to 1500 m. Armor penetration performance increased further with the development of APDS (Armor-Piercing, Discarding Sabot) and other more modern ammunition types after WWII. A more effective high-explosive shell was also developed after the war, taking advantage of the larger 100 mm bore.

It was originally designed to equip the SU-100 tank destroyer as the D-10S (for samokhodnaya, 'self-propelled'), and was later mounted on the post-war T-54 main battle tank as the D-10T (for tankovaya, 'tank' adj.). There was no significant difference in functionality or performance between the two versions. It was also tested on the T-34, T-44, KV-1, and IS-2 (obyekt 245).

In 1955 a stabilizer (vertical-plane STP-1 Gorizont) and bore evacuator were added to the new D-10TG version of the gun. In 1956, the subsequent D-10T2S version of the gun began production for T-54B and T-55 tanks, equipped with two-plane Tsyklon gun stabilization. Versions of the D-10 were installed on new tanks as late as 1979, and thousands still remain in service in various countries.

Returning to its naval roots, a version of the D-10 was installed as a coastal artillery piece in Finland in the 1960s. This weapon is designated 100 56 TK in Finnish Navy service and consists of a complete T-55 tank turret without the stabilizer but furnished with a manually operated ammunition lift, a chute for used cases, and gun laying apparatus allowing indirect fire directed by remote fire control. The maximum elevation of the barrel was also increased and the turret was furnished with new aiming optics, in some cases including a thermographic camera for night use.

== Variants ==
- BS-3 - field gun 52-P-412
- ZIF-25 - Casemates gun 52-PC-412
- D-10S - anti-tank gun 52-SS-412, designed for installation in ACS SU-100 and SU-101
  - D-10SU - anti-tank gun 52-PS-412U differs from the basic version of the presence of the balancing mechanism
- D-10T - tank gun 52-PT-412 is designed for installation in the tank T-54
  - D-10T2 - tank gun 52-PT-412-2 is equipped with a balancing mechanism, designed for installation in the tank T-54
  - D-10TG - tank gun 52-PT-412c, and is equipped with an ejector one-plane stabilizer arms, designed for installation in the tank T-54A
  - D-10T2S - tank gun 52-PT-412D is equipped with an ejector and two-plane stabilizer arms, designed for installation in the tank T-54B and T-55
- D-33 - tank gun 2A48 and 2A48-1, lightweight 600 kg, designed for installation in light/amphibious tanks object 685 and object 934
- D-50 / D-10 - anti-tank gun, designed for installation in SU-100P
- M-63 - modification, designed for installation in Object 416
- Type 59 - Chinese copy gun D-10T for installation in the tank Type 59

== Ammunition ==
During World War II, UOF-412 round carried the 15.6 kg (34.39 lbs) F-412 high-explosive fragmentation shell. Anti-tank ammunition available from World War II until the late 1960s was based on the UBR-412 round, including the BR-412 armour-piercing high-explosive projectile, with the ballistic-capped BR-412B and BR-412D ammunition becoming available in the late 1940s. There was also a D-412 smoke shell.

In 1964, the NII-24 research bureau started design work on an improved 3UBM6 anti-tank round. In 1967 the 3BM6 hyper-velocity armour-piercing discarding-sabot round (HVAPDS) entered service: At a range of 2,000 m, it could penetrate 290 mm of flat armour, or 145 mm of armour angled at 60 degrees from the vertical. It was later replaced by the 3BM8 HVAPDS projectile, with a tungsten carbide penetrator. High-explosive anti-tank (HEAT) rounds, which penetrate armour with the focused explosion of a shaped charge, included the 3UBK4 with 3BK5M warhead, later replaced by the 3UBK9 with 3BK17M warhead.

In the 1980s, 3UBM11 antitank rounds were introduced, with 3BM25 armour-piercing fin-stabilized discarding-sabot (APFSDS) tungsten carbide penetrator, which increased its armor penetration.

In 1983, the T-55M and T-55AM tank upgrade program also added the ability to some tanks to fire the 9K116-1 Bastion guided missile system (NATO reporting name AT-10 Stabber), for long-range engagements of tanks and low-flying helicopters. The anti-tank missile is encased in the 3UBK10-1 shell, which is handled, loaded, and fired exactly like a conventional tank gun round. 1.5 seconds after firing, a laser guidance window in the tail of the round is uncovered, and its rocket engine ignites to burn for up to six seconds, with a total missile flight time of up to 41 seconds.

Missile ammunition includes:

- 3UBK10-1 (9M117 Bastion), penetrating 600 mm at up to 4,000 m
- 3UBK10M-1 (9M117M Kan) tandem warhead, penetrating 650 mm at up to 4,000 m
- 3UBK23-1 (9M117M1 Arkan) extended-range tandem warhead, penetrating 750 mm at up to 6,000 m
- 3UBK23M-1 (9M117M2 Boltok) extended-range warhead penetrating 850 mm at up to 6,000 m

== Performance ==
D-10S 100 mm ammunition and penetration figures of Russian 80% success criteria.
Round	BR-412 APHE	F-412 HE
Weight	15.6 kg	15.8 kg
Muzzle velocity	895 m/s	900 m/s
Penetration at 500 m	160 mm	–
Penetration at 1,000 m	150 mm	–

== Ammunition specifications ==
Designation	Origin	Designer & producer	Year	(Sub)-projectile length	Penetrator dimension	L/D ratio (sub-projectile / penetrator only)	Penetrator material & weight	Sub-projectile weight with sabot / Projectile Weight	Propellant type & weight	Chamber pressure	Muzzle velocity	Velocity drop	Perforation at normal and oblique incidences	Notes
BR-412	Soviet Union			362mm (326mm penetrator)	100mm		Steel, 15.6 kg				895 m/s		150mm at 0° at 1000m	APHE projectile
BR-412B	Soviet Union			404mm (309mm penetrator)	100mm						895 m/s			APHE projectile
BR-412D	Soviet Union			394mm	100mm						887 m/s			APHE projectile
3BM-8	Soviet Union			223mm	55mm diameter	4.05 L/D					1415 m/s	106.5 m/s (at 1000 m)	290mm at 0° at 1900m, ~80mm at 60° at 1900m	APDS-T projectile
3BM-19	Soviet Union										1480 m/s			
3BM-20	Soviet Union			475mm	38mm	12.5 L/D					1480 m/s			APFSDS projectile
3BM-25	Soviet Union													
Type 1959	China										1435 m/s		100mm at 65° at 2000m	Original Chinese APFSDS from 1980's
M1000A1	Belgium	Mecar (subsidiary of Nexter Systems)					Tungsten alloy	5.0 kg	8.0 kg		1475 m/s		380 mm LOS at 1000 m at 60°	
DTW2-100	China	NORINCO									1475 m/s		150mm at 65° at 2400m	License produced M1000A1
M309	Israel	Israel Military Industries (now Elbit Systems)					Tungsten alloy		6 kg		1400 m/s			Israeli 105mm M413 penetrator inside 100mm Sabot

== See also ==
=== Weapons of comparable role, performance and era ===
- 8.8 cm KwK 43 German tank gun
- 90 mm gun M1/M2/M3 US tank gun
- Ordnance QF 20 pounder British tank gun

=== Anti-tank guns using the same 100×695mmR ammunition ===
- 100 mm field gun M1944 (BS-3) Soviet anti-tank gun
- 100 mm vz. 53 Czechoslovak anti-tank gun
- Tampella 100 PSTK Finnish anti-tank gun
