= SU-152G =

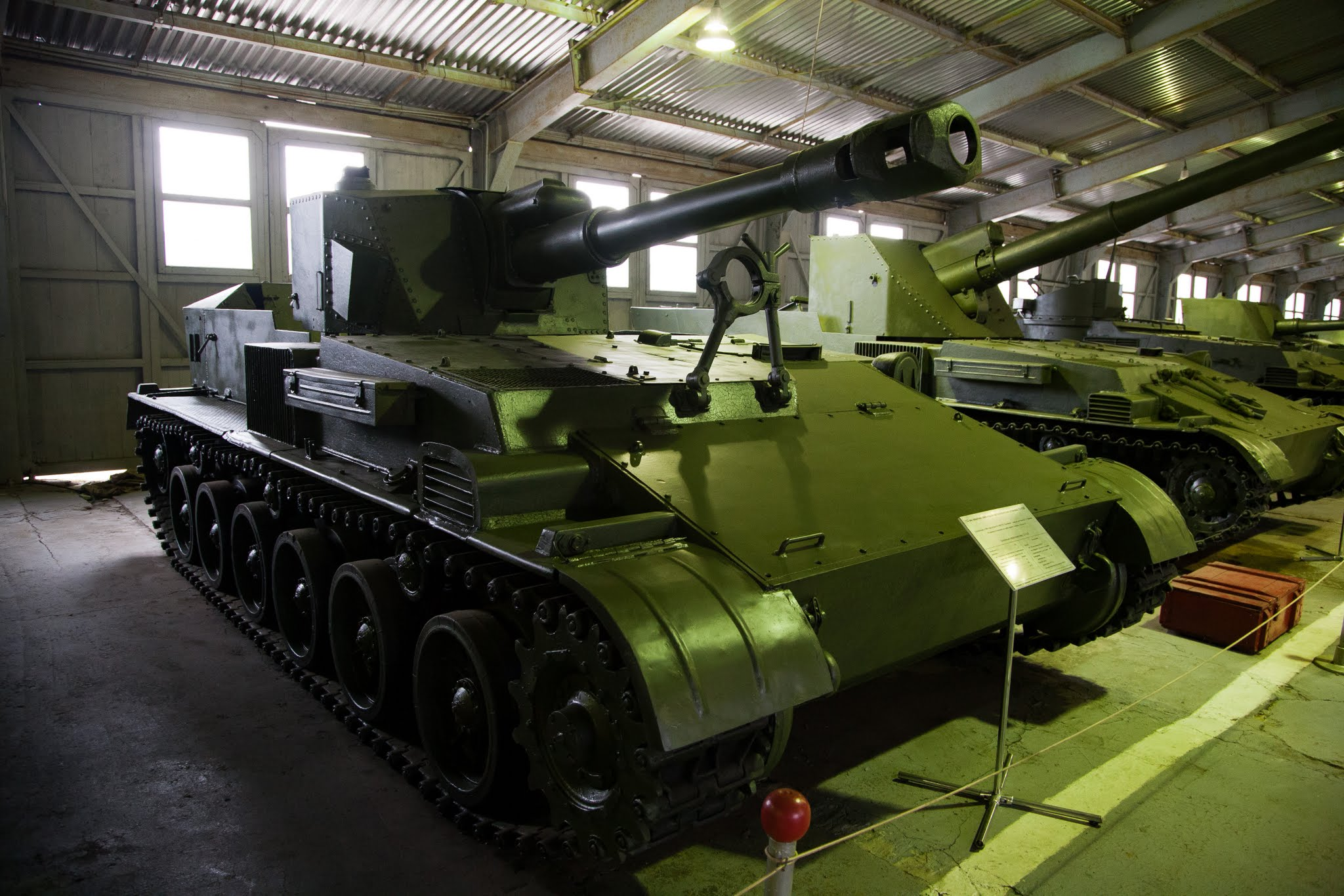
- The SU-152G on display at the Kubinka Tank Museum
- Type: Self-propelled howitzer
- Place of origin: USSR

Production history
- Designer: Lev Gorlitsky
- Designed: 1948–1950
- Produced: 1948
- No. built: 1

Specifications
- Mass: 23.8 t
- Length: 6.46 metres (21 ft 2 in)
- Width: 3.1 metres (10 ft 2 in)
- Height: 2.62 metres (8 ft 7 in)
- Crew: 5
- Main armament: 152mm D-50/D-1
- Engine: V-105; 294 kW, 394hp
- Ground clearance: 400 mm
- Operational range: 290 km on-road

The SU-152G (Russian: СУ-152Г, GABTU index "Object 108") was a Soviet experimental 152-mm self-propelled howitzer or Russian: Samokhodnaya Ustanovka, and was designed by OKB-3 of the heavy machine construction division of Uralmash. The main designer of the SU-152G was Lev Gorlitsky. The SU-152G was intended to suppress and destroy enemy firing positions, engage enemy armored vehicles, as well as conducting area denial and counter-battery tasks.

== History ==
At the end of the World War II in 1945, the USSR started to seek a new anti-tank and assault gun to defeat armored targets by direct fire. At that time, the Western world and the US were developing artillery capable of firing at high elevation angles from behind cover. Gradually, these artillery began to replace the towed guns that had once been used. The important role self-propelled guns played in local conflicts was also becoming obvious. Despite the necessary sighting adaptations for high-elevation firing provided to Soviet artillery guns, the maximum barrel elevation available was often only 15-20 degrees. This significantly hampered the performance of self-propelled artillery, especially when compared with the towed ones.

The main threats against self-propelled artillery were German Waffenträgers, lightly armored self-propelled anti-tank guns, some models of which were captured by the Soviet army in the spring of 1945. Using data from these artillery, OKB-3 under L. I. Gorlitsky prepared two projects for the new artillery. Decree No. 2252-935 of the USSR was issued on 22 June 1948, in accordance to which OKB-3 started the designing process.

The designing of the SU-152G was mainly handled by OKB-3, while the D-50/D-1 gun was developed by OKB-9. The first experimental model of the artillery was completed in March 1948, and was handed over to the military representatives of the factory on 16 June 1948. Two more D-50/D-1 guns were made by factory No. 9 till 31 December 1948. The SU-152G, together with the SU-100P anti-tank gun, was directed to undergo factory trial. The trial included a 865-kilometer drive, as well as an 88- and a 51-round firing volley. Results of the test showed that the rate of fire and the performance of the SU-152G was satisfactory. However, a number of defects were found in the design of rubber-metal hinges, which were used in Soviet armored vehicles for the first times, and there were problems with the tracks as well.

After the factory trial the SU-152G underwent state trials. The SU-152G, together with the SU-100P and the SU-152P took part in state trials, which revealed flaws in the chassis of the SU-100P. Improvements of the basic chassis and elimination of identified flaws continued until June 1955, after which the SU-100P and the SU-152G were adopted into service by the Soviet Army, but most of the work on self-propelled guns were called off by Khrushchev in 1955, which stopped the SU-152G from entering mass production.

== Design description ==
=== Hull and turret ===
The SU-152G uses an open turret mounted on the hull. The hull was welded from rolled homogeneous armor (RHA) and is divided into 3 compartments: the power compartment which houses the transmissions and the engine, the driving compartment, and the combat compartment. The engine and the transmissions were housed in the front right part of the vehicle. To its left were the driving mechanisms with chassis controls. In the middle of the vehicle was the combat compartment, which was equipped with armored shielding. The ammo rack is located to the rear, analogous to that of the SU-100P. The gun was located on the turret above the hull. The turret had a traverse range of 71.5 degrees to either the left or the right, and the maximum elevation range was from -5 to +40 degrees. The entire vehicle needed a crew of 5 to operate. The armor was made to withstand gunfire and shrapnel damage. The armor for the hull was 25 mm thick (0.98 in), while the turret had 15 mm-thick (0.59 in) armor.

=== Armament ===
Main 152.4-mm shells used by the SU-152G. Note how the letter Г is incorrectly shown as r.: 1. OF-530 High Explosive Fragmentation shell; 2. O-530A Fragmentation shell; 3. G-530 High Explosive Anti-Concrete shell

The main armament of the SU-152G was the D-50/D-1 152-mm howitzer. It had identical ballistic characteristics, internal mechanisms and uses the same ammunition with the D-1 152 mm towed howitzer. The barrel was connected to the breech, and a muzzle brake was fitted to the barrel. A vertical, wedged gate was installed in the breech, along with a semi-automatic, free-floating ejector. To ease the loading process, a mechanical loader was placed as well. The gunner's seat has a ZIS-3 panoramic sight for high-elevation indirect firing, and an OP1-7 direct-firing sight for observation of shell impact. The ammo rack of the SU-152G holds 42 shells.

The main shell employed by the D-50/D-1 was the 53-OF-530 High Explosive Fragmentation shell fitted with an RGM, RGM-2 or a D-1 fuse. When fired with full propellant charge, the shells had a muzzle velocity of 508 meters per second with a maximum range of 12.39 km. The 53-OF-530 has a steel casing and 5.83 kg of TNT as payload. When equipped with a contact fuze, it was capable of a 2100-square-meter area denial against enemy infantry in a standing profile, and was able to create a crater up to 1.2 m deep and up to 3.5 m in diameter. For greater effect against infantry the 53-O-530A fragmentation round was used with an RGM-2 or D-1-U fuse, or the 53-OF-530R High Explosive Fragmentation shell and the 3OF9, armed with AR-26 and AR-30 radio-fuzes for air-bursting capabilities, respectively.

For anti-tank fire the SU-152G was capable of using 53-BP-540 HEAT shells, with a penetration capability of up to 250 mm of Rolled Homogeneous Armor. Naval High-Explosive, Semi-Armor-Piercing A3-PB-35 shells were also available, with the capability of penetrating 68 mm of RHA at a range of 2 km. The range of choice also included special-purpose shells, which include illumination rounds, smoke shells, concrete-piercing shells and chemical shells. 4Zh5 and 54-Zh-536M propellant charges were used to fire HEAT and naval shells. The 54-Zh-536 propellant charge was used for the rest, intended for D-1 and M-10 howitzers, the 54-Zh-534 propellant, on the other hand, was dedicated to firing from 152 mm howitzer model M1909/30s, and their use was recommended to be avoided since their use could lead to chamber expansion and consequentially, difficult shell exits.

==== Table of ammunition ====
Ammunition designations
Shell index	Projectile index	Charge index	Charge weight, kg	Projectile weight, kg	Fuse	Muzzle velocity, with maximum charge, m/s	Maximum range, km
Armor-piercing
3VBP1	53-BP-540	4Zh5	27.67	5.6	GKB, GPB-3	560	3
Semi-armor-piercing
53-VF-536M	A3-PB-35	54-Zh-536M	51.07	3.15	KTMF	432	5
Concrete-piercing
53-VG-534	53-G-530	54-Zh-534	40	5.1	KTD	405	10.14
53-VG-536	53-G-530	54-Zh-536	40	5.1	KTD, DBT	457	11.2
53-VG-536	53-G-530Sh	54-Zh-536/4Zh13	40	4.89	KTD, DBT	508	12.33
High explosive
53-VO-534A	53-O-530A	54-Zh-534	40	5.31	RGM, RGM-2, D-1	405	10.14
53-VO-536A	53-O-530A	54-Zh-536/4Zh13	40	5.31	RGM-2, D-1-U	508	12.39
High explosive fragmentation
53-VOF-534	53-OF-530	54-Zh-534	40	5.83	RGM, RGM-2, D-1	405	10.14
53-VOF-536	53-OF-530	54-Zh-536/4Zh13	40	5.83	RGM-2, D-1-U	508	12.39
53-VOF-536R	53-OF-530R	54-Zh-536/4Zh13	40	5.43	AR-26	508	12.39
3VOF13	3OF9	4Zh13	40	5.43	AR-30	508	12.39
3VOF101	3OF66	4Zh13	40.85	7.8	RGM-2M, V-90, AR-5		13.7
Fragmentation
	53-F-531		44.91	5.7
53-VF-534	53-F-533	54-Zh-534	40.3	8.8		386	8.57
53-VF-534K	53-F-533K	54-Zh-534	40.7	7.3	RGM, RGM-2, RG-6	386	8.57
53-VF-534N	53-F-533N	54-Zh-534	40.7	7.3	UGT-2	386	8.57
53-VF-534U	53-F-533U	54-Zh-534	40.8	8.8	RGM, RGM-2, RG-6	386	8.57
53-VF-534F	53-F-533F	54-Zh-534	41.1	3.9	AD, AD-2, ADN	384	8.57
Shrapnel
53-VSh-534	53-Sh-501	54-Zh-534	41.2	0.5	45 sec.	384	8.28
53-VSh-534T	53-Sh-501T	54-Zh-534	41.2	0.5	T-6	384	7.89
Smoke
53-VD-536	53-D-530	54-Zh-536
Illumination
3VS4	3S1	4Zh13	40.2	—	T-7	654
Chemical
	53-KhS-530 (Note: Persistent poison type)	54-Zh-536/4Zh13	38.8			508	12.39
	53-KhS-530D		42.5	5.4 (Note: R-43 substance (Viscous Lewisite))
	53-KhN-530 (Note: Unstable poison type)	54-Zh-536/4Zh13	39.1		KTM-2	508	12.39
	53-OKh-530		40		KTM-2, RG-6	508	12.39
	3Kh3		40	2.873 (Note: R-55 substance (Soman))	RGM-2
	3Kh3-35		40	2.82 (Note: R-35 substance (Sarin))	RGM-2

=== Communications ===
The SU-152G was equipped with a 10-RT radio station for communications, while internal communications between the crew was accomplished by the TPU-47-3 intercom.

=== Engine and transmission ===
A V-105 (V-54-105) V12 four-stroke diesel engine was mounted on the SU-152G, capable of outputs of up to 400 horsepower. It is modified from a V-54 engine while making the following adjustments:

- The spring corrector of the NK-10 pump was removed;
- The outlet nozzles, intake manifold, fan drive and the water pump cover was modified;
- The "Kimaf-STZ" oil filter was installed on a separate bracket;
- A G-74 3 kW generator was installed;
- The motor resource was increased;
- The radiator grille was changed for better cooling efficiency.

The SU-152G utilizes planetary transmission, with six shifts for going forward and two for reversing. The maximum speed at shift 6 was found to be at 63 km/h.

=== Chassis ===
The chassis of the SU-152G was based on that of the SU-100P self-propelled anti-tank gun, and consisted of 6 pairs of rubberized support and three pairs of supporting rollers. On the rear part of the vehicle the guide wheels were installed, while the driving sprockets were mounted on the front. The tracks consisted of small links with rubber-metal forged hinges. Each track measured 412 by 133 millimeters. The SU-152G used individual torsion for suspension. Hydraulic shock absorbers were installed on the first and the sixth pair of rollers.

== Comparison to similar vehicles ==
=== Comparison with previous and next generation artillery ===
	ISU-152M	SU-152G	2S3
Combat weight, t	46.0	23.8	27.5
Crew, # people	5	5	4
Gun employment	Closed top	Open top	Closed top
Gun model	ML-20S	D-50/D-1	2A33
Gun length, caliber(s)	28	23	28
Vertical elevation, degrees	−3...+20	−5...+40	−4...+60
Horizontal elevation, degrees	10	143	360
Ammunition, rounds	20	42	40
Maximum range of HEF rounds, km	13.0	12.39	17.4
HEF round weight, kg	43.56	40.00	43.56
Rate of fire, rounds/min	2—3	3—4	1.9—3.5
Possibility of artillery fire	No	Yes	Yes
Possibility of mortar fire	No	No	Yes
Anti-aircraft machine gun caliber, mm	12.7	—	7.62
Maximum speed on-road, km	40	65	60
Range on-road, km	400	290	500

The main differences between the SU-152G and the ISU-152 as well as its variants, and that between it and 2S3 made it what appeared to be a middle ground between these two self-propelled guns. The ISU-152 was intended to be a heavy assault gun from the beginning, which required capability of direct firing, and a weak transition towards firing from closed positions began. In addition, the crew of the vehicles were often poisoned by the exhaust gases after firing in closed combat compartments. Despite the overt advantage of the SU-152G over the ISU-152 in terms of firing from closed positions, serial production of the SU-152G was never put in effect. All the work on Soviet self-propelled guns were put into a halt in the 1960s and only resumed when the First Secretary of the TsK KPSS was removed from position. As a result, the 2S3 "Acacia" was made, favorably different from its predecessor with further increased vertical traverse angles, a closed combat compartment, CBRN protection, a turret capable of circular fire and an increased angle.

=== Comparison of the SU-152G with foreign counterparts ===
	Soviet Union—SU-152G	France--F3	US--M44	UK--FV 3805
Designed	1946—1955	Early 1950s	1946—1951	1950s
Combat weight, t	23.8	17.4	25.3	50
Crew, # people	5	10	5	5
Gun caliber, mm	152.4	155	155	139.7
Gun length, calibers	23	33	23.2	30
Vertical traverse range, degree	−5...+40	0...+67	−5...+65	−5...+45
Horizontal traverse range, degree	143	46—50	60	
Ammunition, rounds	42	25	24	
Maximum range of HEF shells, km	12.39	14.7	15	14,63 (Note: For the 45.34 kg shell)/16,46 (Note: For the 36.28 kg shell)
HEF shell weight, kg	40.00	43.75	43.88	45.34/36.28
Maximum speed on-road, km/h	65	60	56.3	34
Unit power, hp/t		15.6	14	10.73
Unit pressure, kg/cm^{2}		0.71	0.84	
Range on-road, km	290	300	120	120

The US had developed a new 155-mm self-propelled howitzer on the basis of the T41 light tank from 1946 to 1947, receiving the designation of T99. The T99 was a 155-mm T97 howitzer mounted in a closed armored compartment, which in turn is mounted on a chasses. To fire the howitzer a separated loading procedure is mandatory. It also came with an automated fire control. However, the results of the Korean War had forced the US military to accelerate the process of designing a new self-propelled howitzer. The resulting T99E1 had a capped loading procedure. The gun control system was also simplified and differed from that used on SPGs of the Second World War. During the course of further development of the T99E1, the T194 was created, featuring an open combat compartment with a reduced ammunition load from 30 to 24 rounds. The T194 was subsequently adopted into use as the M44

On the basis of the Centurion Mk.7 the 139.7 mm self-propelled howitzer, designated FV3805, was created. The main armament of this self-propelled gun was the 5.5-inch cannon-howitzer. The maximum range achievable with a 45.35 kg shell was 14.8 km, however, a lighter 36.28 kg shell also used for the cannon had a better range of 16.46 km. The body of the SPG provides armored protection for the crew at the base of the vehicle. To increase stability of the automatic control system during firing, a folding opener was located in the rear of the hull. An easier option with an open installation of the gun was available as well, but it did not go further than a prototype obtained by combining the Crusader tank with some parts of the FV300 series.

France in the beginning of the 1950s developed a 155 mm SPG, designated the F3, on the basis of the AMX-13 light tank. The maximum range was 14.7 km with M107 shells. An advantage over the SU-152G, the F3 had a lighter combat weight (17.4 t against 23.8 t), however, it could only carry a total of 25 rounds. Additionally, it required 10 people to operate, two would station in the vehicle while it was mobile, an additional 4 would be transported when it was preparing for firing missions, while the rest would be transported in a special truck that would accompany the SPG.

Local conflicts during the post-war period had proved the necessity of this class of self propelled guns. A series of SPGs were created by the USSR in an attempt to design new self-propelled howitzers, which included the SU-152G. However, most of the work ceased when Nikita Khrushchev issued an order in 1955. The result of this decision was a backstep in the following decades for the USSR, compared to NATO countries, which could only be liquidated by the early 1970s.

== Surviving examples ==
- Russia:
  - Kubinka: The single experimental prototype is held on display at the Kubinka Museum.
