= Tampella 100 PSTK =

Finnish anti-tank gun

100 PSTK
- Type: Anti-tank gun
- Place of origin: Finland

Service history
- Used by: See operators

Production history
- Designer: Tampella
- Designed: 1986–1988
- Manufacturer: Tampella
- Produced: 1988–1989
- No. built: 1

Specifications
- Mass: <4,000 kg (8,800 lb) (combat)
- Length: 6.80 m (22 ft 4 in) (transport); 10.50 m (34 ft 5 in) (combat)
- Barrel length: 5,350 mm (211 in) L/54
- Width: 2.40 m (7 ft 10 in)
- Height: 1.75 m (5 ft 9 in)
- Crew: 1+7
- Shell: Fixed QF 100 × 695 mmR
- Caliber: 100 mm (3.9 in)
- Breech: Horizontal semi-automatic sliding block
- Recoil: Hydro-pneumatic
- Carriage: Shielded split trail, auxiliary power unit and hydraulics
- Elevation: −10° to +20°
- Traverse: ±30° from centreline
- Rate of fire: 6 rpm
- Muzzle velocity: 1,450 m/s (4,800 ft/s) (APFSDS)
- Effective firing range: 2,000 m (2,200 yd) (APFSDS)
- Sights: NIFE RS-420 telescopic day sight Night sight
- Engine: Rotax 635; 28 kW (38 bhp)
- Ground clearance: 0.35 m (1 ft 2 in); Boreline: 0.80 m (2 ft 7 in)
- Maximum speed: 20 km/h (12 mph) (with APU); 80 km/h (50 mph) (towed)

The Tampella 100 PSTK (from Finnish 100 millimetrin panssarintorjuntakanuuna, '100 millimetre anti-tank gun'; Tampella project name projekti 487 "Piiska") is a Finnish towed 100 mm anti-tank gun, designed in the 1980s by Tampella. It was designed for commonality with the D-10T tank gun, in use by the Finnish Defence Forces in the T-54 and T-55 tanks, as well as the 100 56 TK coastal artillery piece. However, due to multitude of reasons it never went into serial production.

== Development ==
In 1986 chief of the Infantry Office of the Finnish Defence Command, Lt. Col. Paavo Kuronen, brought out the question of a range gap in anti-tank weaponry, between contemporary man-portable anti-tank weaponry and anti-tank missiles, ie. 400 and 1000 metres, as well as the multitude of armed vehicles and their rising performance against infantry on the contemporary battlefield. In addition, the FDF Defence Command was worrying of the lack of suitable anti-tank weaponry at the aforementioned ranges to match the increasingly more common explosive reactive armour and layered composite armour. At the time, Finland was also in the process of scrapping its stock of obsolete 75 PstK 40 anti-tank guns (German 7.5 cm Pak 40). The existing 95 S 58-61 recoilless rifle was theoretically suitable, but its backblast was a remarkable downside, and the old ammunition types didn't offer much to defeat the reactive and composite armour. To this dilemma, the Infantry Office proposed a new anti-tank gun firing modern armour-piercing fin-stabilized discarding sabot (APFSDS) ammunition, a system which could be manufactured entirely in Finland (as opposed to the American and Soviet anti-tank missile systems currently in use by FDF).

The FDF Defence Command Infantry Office created a draft of specifications and presented them to Tampella in spring 1986. The new anti-tank gun were to use the barrel and breech block (complete barrel assembly) of the Soviet D-10T (which was in use by FDF in the existing T-54, T-55 and 100 56 TK systems), with a new carriage, cradle (including recoil system) and traverse unit. Thanks to this, it could use the new Mecar APFSDS which was introduced to the T-55 in the FDF T-55M project. It were to have an auxiliary power unit (APU) for assisted movement, a shield to protect from small arms fire and both day and image intensifier based night sights. Its combat weight were to be under 3 tonnes, traverse 60° (±30° from centreline) and elevation −10° to +20°, according to the initial specifications.

After initial calculations by Tampella, FDF Defence Command ordered Tampella to design the gun in May 1987. Tampella ordered the design of the carriage from Sisu Defence, while Tampella concentrated on the design of the gun itself. After the design was ready in November 1987, a prototype gun was ordered by FDF in February 1988, and the final specifications were given. The prototype was delivered in August 1989 after some issues, and field trials were held from January to June 1990 in the Lapland Jaeger Battalion at Sodankylä and to the end of 1990 in the Armoured Brigade at Hämeenlinna.

The trials proved many serious issues: the APU was underpowered for the gun, steering the carriage was difficult and the towing bar of the carriage proved to be too weak, as it fractured repeatedly in use, and the muzzle brake broke due to the pieces of the sabot hitting it. The bore axis was also considered to be too low. The trials were also hindered by lack of spares for the single prototype gun and trivial technical issues such as oil leaks. However, the performance of the gun was considered excellent and the gun was stable in firing position.

The serial production of the gun was intended to be started in 1991, but unsurprisingly, due to the technical issues and a new assessment on the viability of towed anti-tank guns, in July 1991 the FDF Chief of Training Lt. Gen. Matti Kopra officially terminated the project.

The prototype gun was stored in Armoured Brigade, and has been displayed sporadically to the public.

Parts of the recoil mechanism were used in the Patria AMOS and NEMO mortar systems, as Tampella Defence was first merged to FDF Vammaskoski factory after its bankruptcy and subsequently to Patria.

== Technical details ==
- Mass under 4,000 kg (8,800 lb)
- Length 6.8 m (270 in) (transport)
  10.5 m (410 in) (combat)
- Height 1.75 m (69 in)
- Width 2.4 m (94 in)
- Ground clearance 0.35 m (14 in)
- Driving speed 20 km/h (12 mph)
- Towing speed 80 km/h (50 mph)
- Crew 1+7
- Rate of fire 6 rpm
- Shield to protect from small arms fire
- NIFE RS-420 telescopic day sight
- Image intensifier night sight

=== Gun ===
- Barrel from D-10T:
  - Calibre 100 mm (3.9 in)
  - Barrel assembly length 5,600 mm (220 in) L/56
  - Barrel length 5,350 mm (211 in) L/54
  - Rifled bore length 4,630 mm (182 in)
  - Bore axis height 800 mm (31 in) (combat, 0° elevation)
  - Breech semi-automatic horizontal sliding block
- Elevation −10° to +20°
- Traverse ±30° from centreline
- Hydro-pneumatic recoil system

=== Ammunition ===
- JVA 3908 (Mecar M-1000 APFSDS-T)
  - Round weight 20 kg (44 lb)
  - Muzzle velocity 1,450 m/s (4,800 ft/s)
  - Effective firing range 2,000 m (6,600 ft)
- JVA 3900 (UBR-412D APCBC-T)
  - Round weight 30.4 kg (67 lb)
  - Muzzle velocity 895 m/s (2,940 ft/s)
- UOF-412 HE
  - Round weight 30.2 kg (67 lb)
  - Muzzle velocity 900 m/s (3,000 ft/s)

=== Carriage ===
- APU engine Rotax 635
  - Two-stroke petrol engine
  - Power output 28 kW (38 bhp) at 5,300 rpm
  - Torque 53 N⋅m (39 ft⋅lb) at 4,700 rpm
- Traction wheels 14.5x20
  - Double Rexroth hydraulic pumps for power transmission
  - Valmet Black Bear 1600/800 wheel hub motors
  - Drum brakes
- Trail wheel 6.5x16
- Hydraulic suspension

== Operators ==
=== Former operators ===
- Finland – 1 prototype in trials in 1990, withdrawn at the end of the year.

== See also ==
- D-10 tank gun
- BS-3 100 mm AT/field gun
- 100 mm vz. 53 AT/field gun
- 2A19/2A29 100 mm AT gun
- 2A45 Sprut 125 mm AT gun
