= SU-100 =

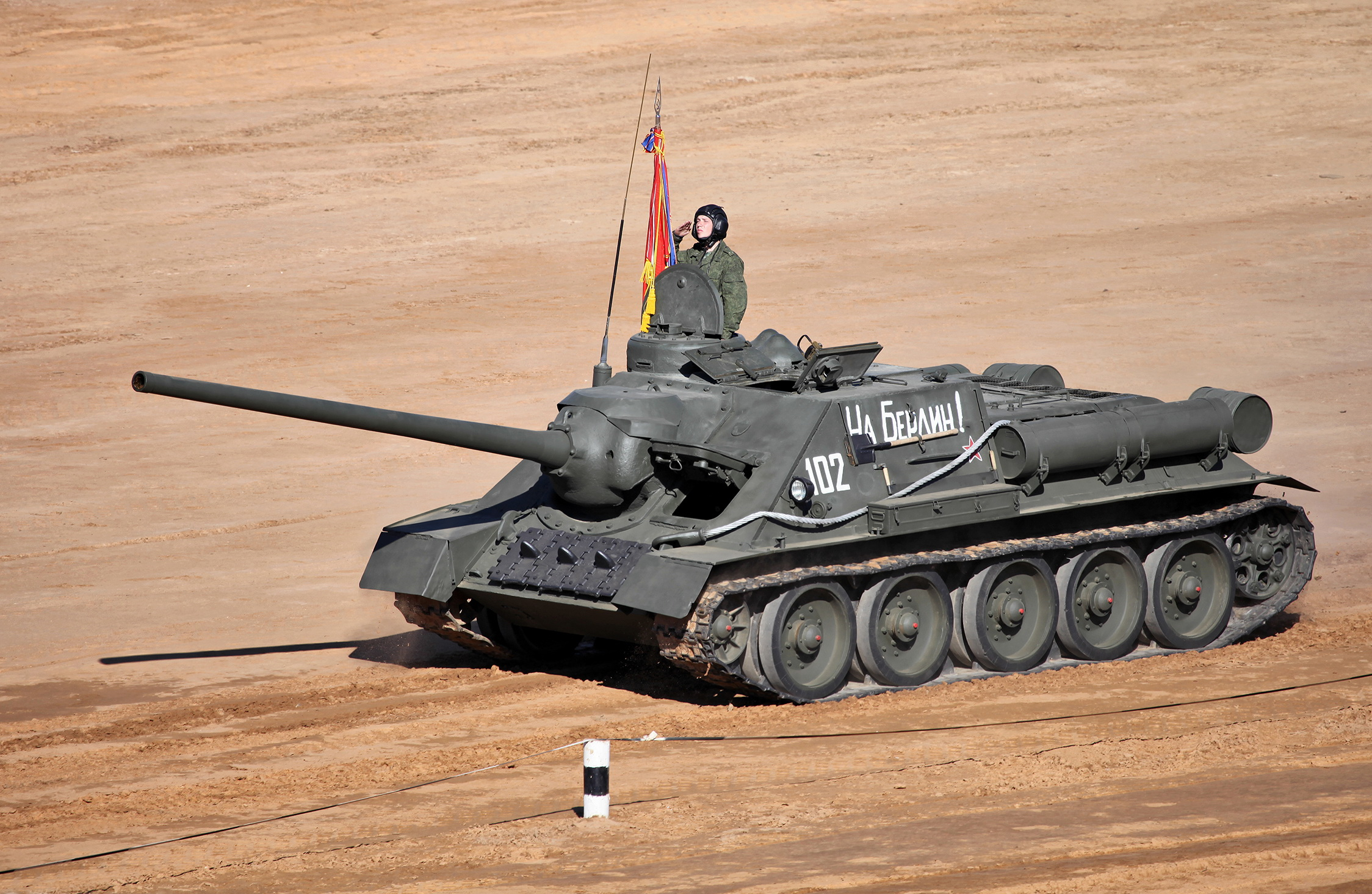
- Russian SU-100 at a 2013 tank biathlon.
- Type: Self-propelled anti-tank gun
- Place of origin: Soviet Union

Service history
- In service: October 1944 – present
- Wars: World War II; Suez Crisis; Vietnam War; Bay of Pigs Invasion; Six-Day War; Yom Kippur War; Iran–Iraq War; Yemeni Civil War (2014-present)

Production history
- Designed: 1944
- Unit cost: $448,000 (vehicle's unit price for Morocco in 1967)
- No. built: 4,976

Specifications
- Mass: 31.6 tonnes (69,665 lbs)
- Length: 9.45 m (30 ft)
- Width: 3.00 m (9 ft 10 in)
- Height: 2.25 m (7 ft 5 in)
- Crew: 4 (Commander/Radio Operator, Gunner, Loader, Driver)
- Armor: front: 75 mm (3 in) sides: 45 mm (1.77 in) rear: 45 mm (1.77 in) roof: 20 mm (.78 in)
- Main armament: 100 mm D-10S gun
- Engine: V-2-34 based on the Kharkiv Model V-2; 500 hp (370 kW)
- Power/weight: 15.8 hp/tonne
- Suspension: Christie
- Operational range: Road: 250 km (160 mi); 320 km (200 mi) (with additional fuel tanks); Cross-country: 140 km (87 mi); 180 km (110 mi) (with additional fuel tanks)
- Maximum speed: 48 km/h (30 mph)

The SU-100 (Russian: самоходная установка-100, СУ-100 romanized: Samokhodnaya Ustanovka-100) is a Soviet tank destroyer armed with the D-10S 100 mm anti-tank gun in a casemate superstructure. It was used extensively during the last year of World War II and saw service for many years afterwards with the armies of Soviet allies around the world.

== Development ==
The SU-85 was developed from the chassis of the T-34 tank replacing the turret with a larger, fixed superstructure that allowed a larger gun to be fitted: the 85 mm D-5 gun, providing dramatically upgraded firepower compared to the T-34's 76.2 mm models. Introduced to service in 1943, the SU-85 was quickly rendered obsolete as a new tank design featured the same gun on the T-34-85.

This prompted the design of a more advanced turretless tank destroyer with an even more powerful cannon. Development was conducted under supervision of L. I. Gorlitskiy, chief designer of all medium Soviet self-propelled guns. The work started in February 1944 and the first prototype of the SU-100, "Object 138", was delivered in March. After intensive testing with different models of 100 mm gun, Soviet engineers approved the D-10S gun for mass production. This gun was developed in Constructors Bureau of Artillery Factory No. 9 under the guidance of F. F. Petrov. After the Second World War this gun was installed on T-54 and T-55 tanks; these vehicles and their derivatives were in service forty years after initial development.

It was built at the UZTM (Russian abbreviation УЗТМ for Уральский Завод Тяжелого Машиностроения – Ural Heavy Machinery Factory, also called Uralmash) in Yekaterinburg. The SU-100 quickly proved itself to be able to penetrate around 125 mm (4.9 in) of vertical armor from a range of 2,000 m (1.2 mi) and the sloped 80 mm (3.1 in) front armor of the German Panther from 1,500 m (0.93 mi) (with APCBC - armour-piercing, capped, ballistic capped shell - round).

The hull of the SU-100 had major improvements over the SU-85; the thickness of the front armour was increased from 45 to 75 mm (1.8 to 3.0 in) with a constructional armour slope of 55 degrees, making armour as effective as 125 mm, which forced the Panzer IV and StuG III to all but the closest ranges and the Tiger I having to close in at less than 1 km. Additional improvements were the commander's station, as it now was positioned in a small sponson on the right side of the hull; combined with the commander's cupola this improved the commander's effectiveness. Its German Jagdpanzer-family counterparts — the Jagdpanzer IV, Jagdpanther and Jagdtiger, by comparison, lacked this key piece of observational equipment. On the other hand, the SU-100's optics were a little inferior (4x optics vs German 5x optics). For better ventilation two ventilator units were installed, instead of only one as in the SU-85. Mass production began in September 1944.

== Service history ==
The SU-100 was introduced in October 1944 and quickly became popular with Soviet tank crews as its gun could penetrate virtually any German tank then in service until being outmatched by the Tiger II. The gun was excellent, being able to penetrate the Tiger I at 2 km with APCBC (Armor Piercing Capped Ballistic Cap) rounds while its APHE (armour-piercing, high-explosive) rounds could penetrate a max of 218 mm of armour. The SU-100 especially saw extensive service during the last year of the war. It was used en masse in Hungary in March 1945, when Soviet forces defeated the German Operation Frühlingserwachen offensive at Lake Balaton. And although not intended for it, the SU-100 was also used in the Battle of Berlin because its gun could deal with heavy fortifications. However, its lack of a machine gun made it need aircraft and infantry support. By July 1945, 2,335 SU-100s had been built.

The vehicle remained in service with the Red Army well after the war; production continued in the Soviet Union until 1947 and into the 1950s in Czechoslovakia. It was withdrawn from Soviet service in 1967 but many vehicles were transferred to reserve stocks. Some exist to this day in the Russian Army holding facilities.

Many Warsaw Pact countries also used the SU-100, as did Soviet allies such as Egypt, Angola and Cuba. A few SU-100 were delivered to Yugoslavia after the war, under the designation M-44. The SU-100 saw service in the fighting that accompanied the 1956 Suez Crisis, in which the Egyptians used SU-100s against Israel's M4 Sherman tanks. The vehicle was also utilized in the 1967 Six-Day War and the 1973 Yom Kippur War. It was modified slightly to adapt it to the sandy conditions of the Middle East, thus creating the SU-100M variant. Exported SU-100s continued in service until the 1970s, and in some countries, even later. The Su-100 saw service during the Yugoslav Wars, but was quickly retired due to a lack of spare parts, despite its satisfactory performance. The SU-100 remains in use by the Vietnam People's Army and the Korean People's Army Ground Force.

SU-100s entered service with the People's Liberation Army (PLA) of China after 1 December 1950 when Soviet forces left Dalian. The armaments in Dalian were sold to China, including 99 SU-100s, 18 IS-2 heavy tanks, and 224 T-34s, with which PLA formed its 1st Mechanised Division.

In April 2015, a SU-100 self-propelled gun was photographed being used in Yemen as part of the ongoing conflict. Video evidence uploaded to YouTube in November 2016 showed an apparent SU-100 being knocked out by an anti-tank guided missile in Yemen.

== Operators ==
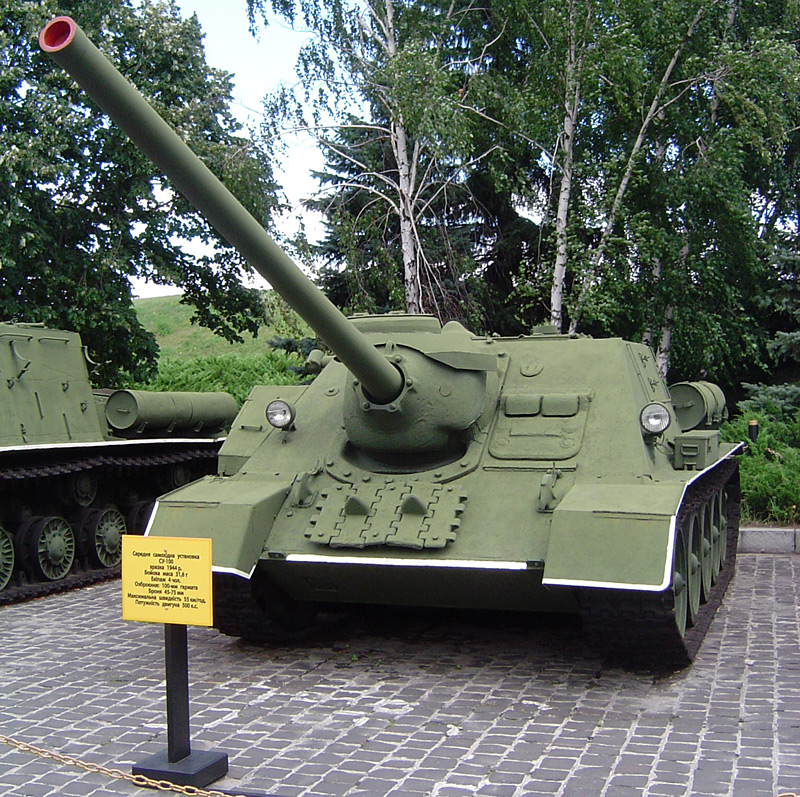
SU-100 at the Museum of the Great Patriotic War, Kyiv, Ukraine

- Algeria: 50 in reserve storage.
- North Korea: 100
- Morocco: 25; 8 operational.
- Romania: 85 acquired by 1957. 23-47 were in reserve storage as of 2022. Photographs show one being used for target practice during the Dacian Fall 2025 NATO multinational exercise.
- Vietnam: 100
- Yemen: 70

=== Former operators ===
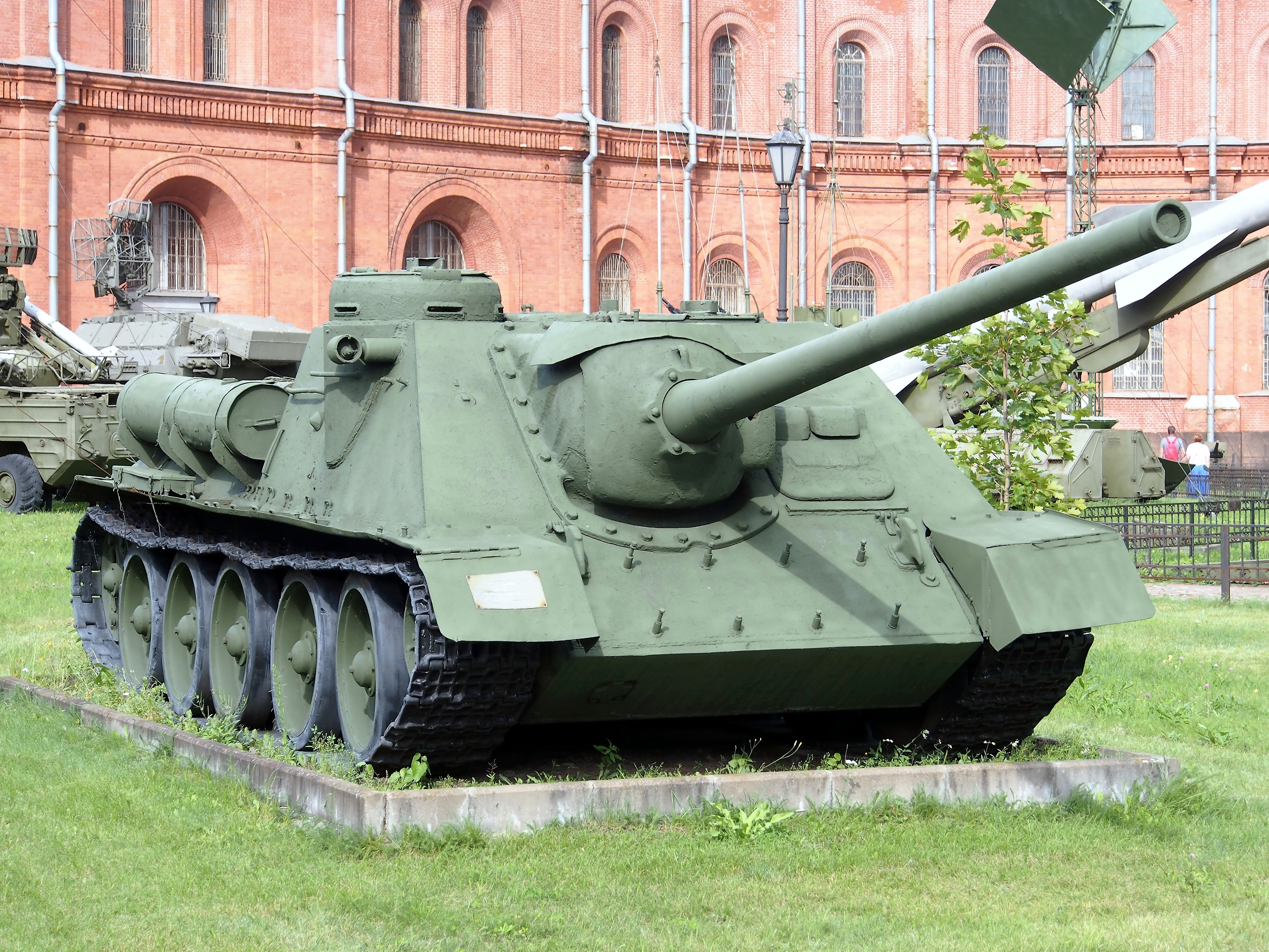
SU-100 in the Military Historical Museum of Artillery, Engineering Troops and Signal Corps. St. Petersburg

- Albania
- Angola: 40; all destroyed in the Angolan Civil War or decommissioned by the late 1980s.
- Bulgaria: 100
- People's Republic of China: 300
- Cuba: 100
- Czechoslovakia: 200
- East Germany: 50
- Egypt: 150
- Hungary: 50
- Iraq: 250
- Mongolia: 10
- North Yemen: 50
- Poland: 25 or 26. Withdrawn from service in late 1960s.
- Soviet Union
- Ba'athist Syria: 80
- Yugoslavia: 40

== See also ==
- List of armored fighting vehicles of the Soviet Union
- T-34
- SU-85
- SU-100Y

=== Tanks of comparable role, performance and era ===
- Jagdpanther
- Type 5 Ho-Ri
- M36 GMC
