= Obiekt 416 =

Object 416
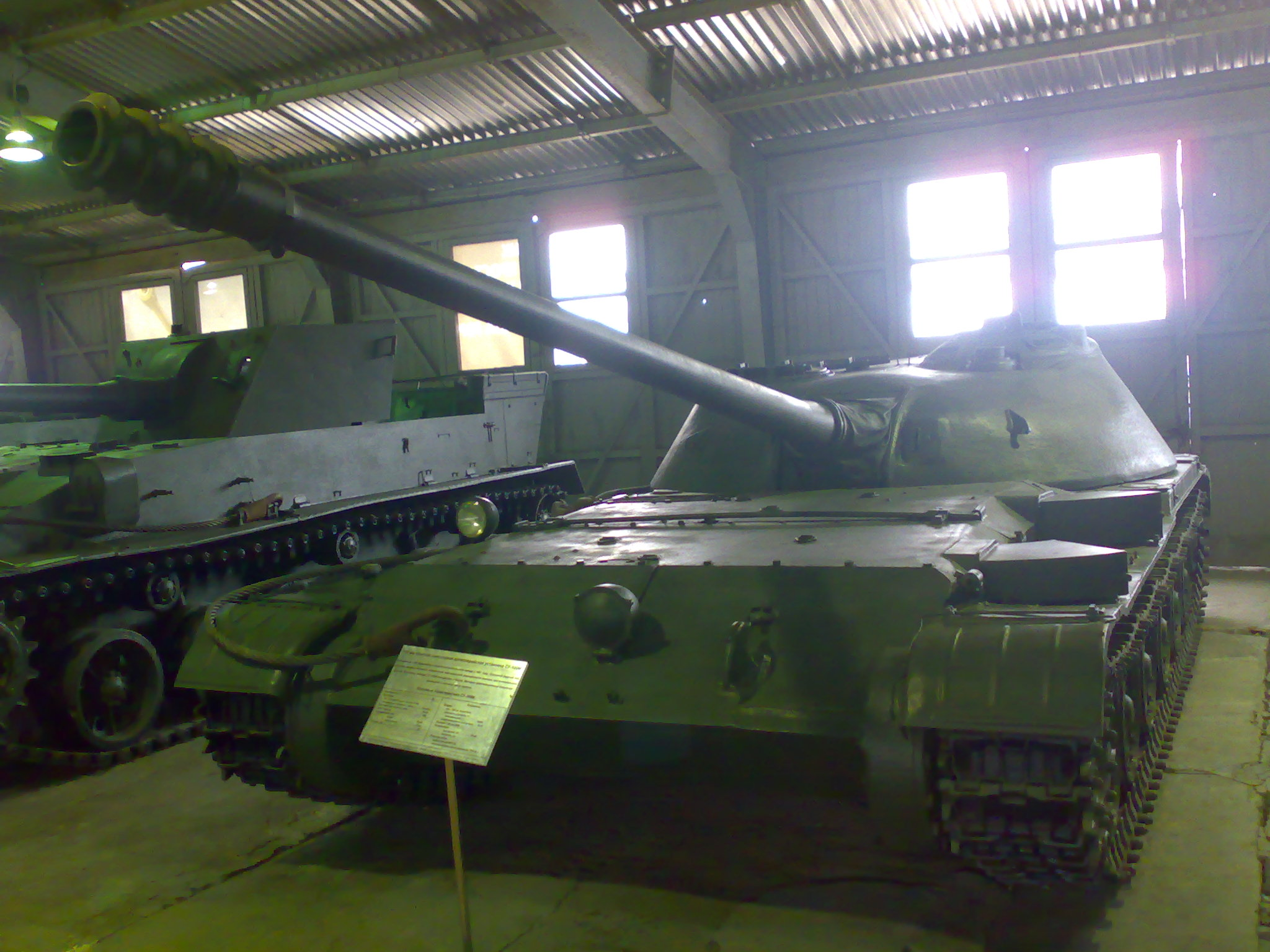
- The only surviving Object 416 in Kubinka Tank Museum.
- Type: Self-propelled gun
- Place of origin: Soviet Union

Production history
- Designed: 1951-1953
- Produced: 1951
- No. built: 1 (prototype)

Specifications
- Mass: 23.7 tons
- Length: 6.35 m
- Width: 3.24 m
- Height: 1.823 m
- Crew: 4
- Caliber: 100 mm (3.93 in)
- Barrels: 1
- Action: Chain drive loading mechanism
- Elevation: -5 to 36 degrees
- Traverse: -75 degrees to 75 degrees
- Rate of fire: 5 – 7 rounds per minute
- Muzzle velocity: ~895 metres per second (2,940 ft/s)
- Sights: Telescopic and Panoramic sights
- Armor: 75 mm (front upper plate)
- Main armament: 100 mm M-63 cannon
- Secondary armament: 7.62 SGMT coaxial machine gun
- Engine: 12 cylinder boxer engine 400 horsepower (300 kW)
- Power/weight: 16.88
- Suspension: Torsion bar
- Operational range: 300 km on highway
- Maximum speed: 50 kilometres per hour (31 mph)

The Object 416 (Russian: Объект 416) is a Soviet prototype self-propelled artillery. It never went beyond prototype stage. It was intended to be a low profile tank destroyer.

== History ==
Object 416 was an odd experimental Soviet medium tank constructed in Kharkov by Construction Bureau of Factory No. 75. Development on the vehicle began in 1950. The technical project of the Object 416 tank was completed in the same year. In 1951 the vehicle was re-designated as an assault gun/tank destroyer. In 1953 the design was finalized after problems with the unusual turret had been solved.

A prototype was produced in 1951. After preliminary tests, a number of defects were identified, such as unreliable control drives and rotating contact devices, and many others. Due to the very low angle of the combat compartment, the crew's work was severely hampered. Due to the complexity of simultaneous traffic control and fire management, work towards the creation of the tank was stopped.

In 1952, the Object 416 passed state tests, but was not adopted. The reason was that in many respects the Object 416 was the same as the SU-100P, and in some ways it was worse, so the deployment of serial production was impractical.

The tank was never accepted for production, and only a single prototype was ever produced. The major problem with the vehicle was steering, due to the unusual placement of the driver, and the limited traverse of the turret made firing on the move difficult.

== Description ==
=== Hull and turret ===
The Object 416 had a welded hull and a cast rotating turret. The M-63 gun were placed in the rotating turret on the back of the hull. The engine was placed in the front of the hull.

=== Armament ===
The Object 416's gun was an M-63 cannon. The M-63 gun was developed at the SKB at the Motovilikha plant in Perm. The D-10T tank gun was taken as a base design. The gun was equipped with a wedge shutter. To stabilize and resilience the gun during shooting, the gun was mounted with a quad-baffle muzzle brake and lowered the line of fire.

=== Engine and transmission ===
The tank was powered by a 400 hp, flat V12 engine.

== Surviving vehicles ==
- Russia: The only surviving prototype is currently in the Kubinka Tank Museum.

== See also ==
- SU-100P
