= ZSU-37-2 Yenisei =

- Type: Self-propelled anti-aircraft weapon

Production history
- Designer: Soviet Union
- Produced: 1960
- No. built: 2

Specifications
- Mass: 27.5 t
- Length: 6360 mm
- Width: 3100 mm
- Height: 3325-3525 mm
- Crew: 4
- Armor: Bulletproof steel plates
- Main armament: Dual 37mm 2A11 500P autocannons
- Engine: V-105V V12 diesel engine (400 hp)
- Power/weight: 14.5
- Suspension: Individual torsion bars with hydraulic shock absorbers in the 1st through 6th roller wheels
- Ground clearance: 450 mm
- Operational range: 450 km on-road; 310 km off-road
- Maximum speed: 60 km/h on-road; 20–25 km/h off-road

The ZSU-37-2 Yenisei ("Yenisey", GRAU index 2A1) was an experimental self-propelled anti-aircraft gun developed in the Soviet Union in the late 1950s. It employed dual 37 mm caliber autocannons with a combined rate of fire of 1048 rounds per minute. After trials the project was halted in 1962 and was not put into serial production.

== History ==
Almost immediately after the ZSU-57-2 went into production, the Council of Ministers of the Soviet Union signed decree Nr. 426-211 on 17 April 1957. The decree ordered that work be started on new types of rapid-firing self-propelled anti-aircraft guns, which were to be named "Shilka" and "Yenisei". Both types would incorporate fire control systems slaved to an on-board radar. The Yenisei was the Soviet Union's response to the M42 Duster which had been put into service in the US.

The Shilka and the Yenisei had different planned tactical purposes; the Shilka was to serve in mechanized infantry regiments and to engage targets up to 1,500 m in altitude, while the Yenisei was to serve in tank divisions and regiments and to engage targets up to 3,000 m in altitude. The prototype for the Yenisei was completed in December 1960. Both the Shilka and the Yenisei were put into trials practically at the same time, albeit with a few upgrades planned.

During state trials, the Yenisei was shown to be capable of firing-on-the-move on even terrain at a speed of 20–25 km/h. Firing on-the-move at speeds of 8–10 km/h resulted in a 25% decrease in accuracy compared to firing while stationary. The Angara cannons had an accuracy 2-2.5 times better than the AZP S-60 mounted on the ZSU-57-2. The guns jammed twice and malfunctioned 4 times throughout the 6266-round firing trial. During the trials it was capable of tracking targets traveling at up to 660 m/s at altitudes greater than 300 m, and at up to 415 m/s at altitudes between 100 and 300 m. It had a mean range of 18 km when attempting to discover a MiG-17-sized target in a 30-degree scanning sector without prior target designation. Maximum vertical tracking speed was 40 degrees/sec. The Yenisei could switch from combat-alert to combat-ready status in 15 seconds.

Results showed that the Yenisei had an effective firing zone similar to that of the ZSU-57-2, while fulfilling the requirement from the Council of Ministers to "cover tank forces in all kinds of battles, and from aerial attacks at altitudes up to 3,000 m".

Concluding from the results from state trials, the Yenisei was reassigned the task of defending the 2K11 Krug and the 2K12 Kub from attacks from the missiles' launch dead zones. It was recommended the Yenisei be accepted into services, however the Council of Ministers signed a decree on 5 September 1962 ordering the Shilka into service, whereas the Yenisei was not chosen for service. 15 days later all work on Yenisei came to a stop.

== Description ==
=== Armor protection and the turret ===
The Yenisei is protected from rifle fire by bulletproof armor plates, with the ammo rack protected from 7.62 mm B-32 armor-piercing rounds fired from 400 meters. A gas turbine designed by NAMI fed electricity to on-board electronics, which enabled quick transition to combat readiness even under low-temperature circumstances, as the radar needed to be properly heated up prior to use.

=== Armament ===
The Yenisei is equipped with the dedicated 2A12 "Angara" weapon complex, designed by OKB-43. The 2A12 consisted of twin 37 mm 500P (GRAU index 2A11) autocannons. The 500P autocannon was designed in OKB-16, headed by Alexander Nudelman, firing dedicated 37 mm cartridges with unique ballistic qualities. The cartridges for the 500P is not interchangeable with other 37 mm cartridges, except the little-known "Shkval" anti-aircraft system which was produced in small numbers. The Angara uses water cooling for its barrels and is traversed with electrohydraulic servos, designed by TsNII-173 of the State Committee of Council of Defence Industry (also known as GKOT) in Moscow, who handled the servos, and its Kovrov affiliate which was responsible for the stabilizers. There were also plans to upgrade the traverse system to a full-electrical one.

The Yenisei was guided with the 1A11 "Baikal" jamming-resistant radar station operating in the centimeter band, with a wavelength of around 3 cm. However, it was found during state trials that neither the "Tobol" radar on the Shilka nor the "Baikal" on the Yenisei could discover aerial targets effectively on its own. Due to this, decree Nr. 426-211 (which ordered the development of the two guns) also ordered that a new tracking radar complex, the "Ob", be put into state trials in the second quarter of 1960.

The Ob consisted of a "Neva" command vehicle with an "Irtysh" scanning radar and a Baikal radar station as mounted on the Yenisei. The Ob would need to control six to eight SPAAGs at once, but work on the Ob was halted in 1959 to speed up final work on the 2K11 Krug.

Normally the Angara would fire a 150-round burst followed by a 30-second cool-down period, after which a new burst could be fired. The cycle would repeat until the entire ammunition load is expended.

=== Chassis ===
The GM-123 chassis of the Yenisei was modified from that of the SU-100P (izdeliye 105M, Object 119), developed by Uraltransmash.

== Specifications ==
- Caliber: 37 mm
- Weapon count: 2
- Cartridge weight: 733 g
- Muzzle velocity: 1010 m/s
- Ammunition load: 540 rounds
- Effective altitude coverage: 100-3,000 m
- Slant range for firing at aerial targets: 4,500 m
- Maximum target speed: 660 m/s
- Slant range for firing at ground targets: 5,000 m
- Rate of fire: 1,048 rounds per minute
- Maximum burst size: 150 rounds
- Effective scanning range: 18 km (for a MiG-17-sized target)
- Effective tracking range: 20 km
- Maximum target speed: 660/414 m/s (for targets above 300 m/between 100–300 m, respectively)
- Vertical traverse: -1/+85 degrees
- Horizontal traverse: 360 degrees
- Combat weight: 27.5 t
- Crew: 4
- Engine power: 400 hp
- Maximum speed on-road: 60 km/h

== Similar vehicles ==
- Object 130 – a self-propelled anti-aircraft based on the ZSU-37-2 Yenisei and the SU-100PM incorporating parts and assemblies from the T-54/T-55. Remained on paper only.
- M247 Sergeant York – a later American equivalent SPAAG that also never entered service despite reaching a pre-production stage
