= SU-85 =

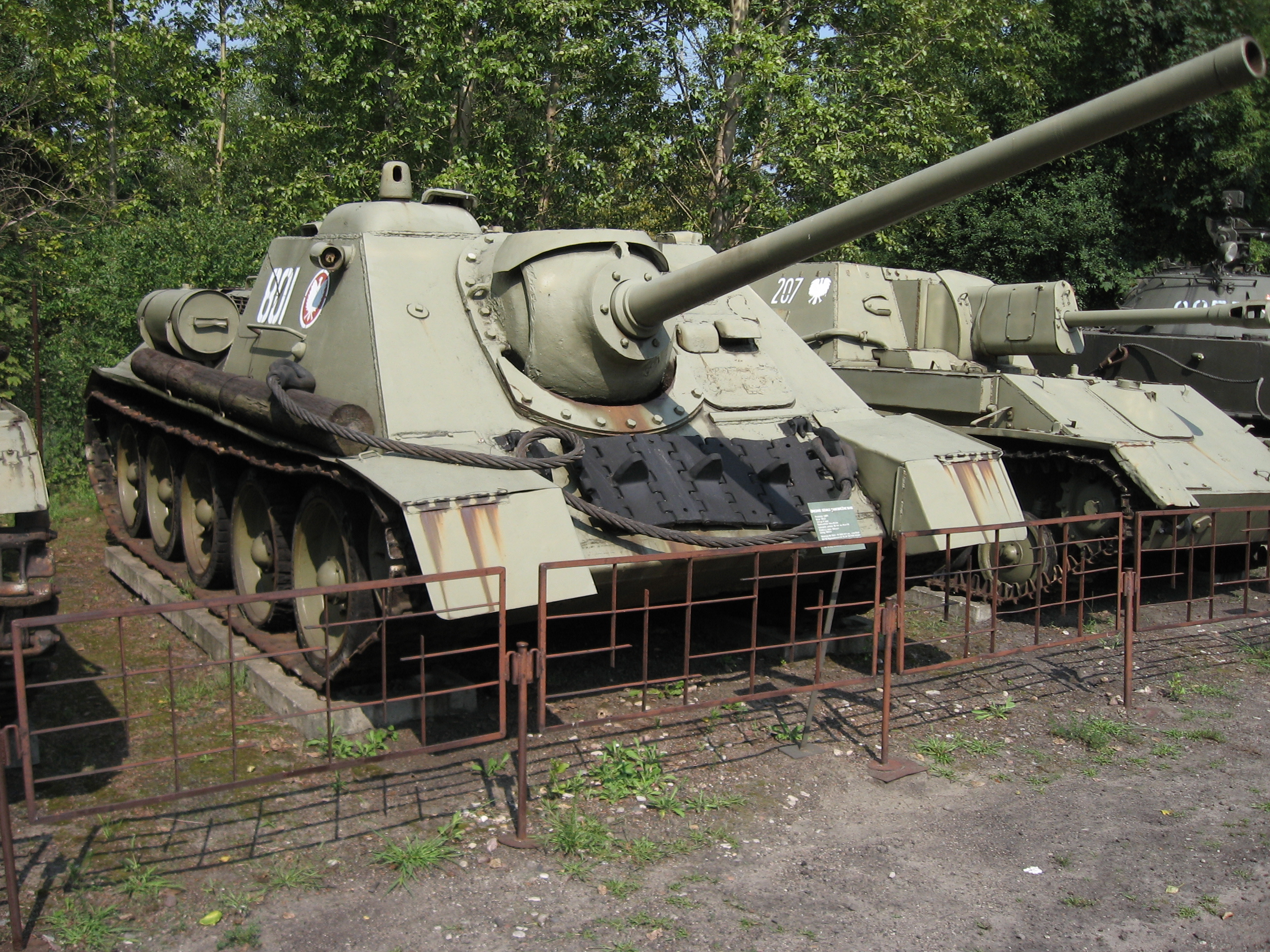
- SU-85 tank destroyer in Polish Army Museum.
- Type: Self-propelled anti-tank gun
- Place of origin: Soviet Union

Service history
- In service: 1943–1950s (USSR)
- Wars: World War II

Production history
- Designer: Lew S. Trojanow
- Designed: 1943
- Produced: 1943–1944
- No. built: 2,650
- Variants: See Variants section

Specifications
- Mass: 29.6 tonnes (65,256 lbs)
- Length: 8.15 m (26 ft 9 in) overall 6.10 m (20 ft) hull only
- Width: 3.00 m (9 ft 10 in)
- Height: 2.45 m (8 ft)
- Crew: 4 (commander, driver, gunner, loader)
- Armor: 45 mm(1.77 in)
- Main armament: 85 mm (3.34 in) D-5T gun
- Secondary armament: none
- Engine: Kharkiv model V-2 V-12 diesel engine 493 hp (500 PS, 368 kW)
- Power/weight: 16.7 hp/tonne (12.43 kW/tonne)
- Suspension: Christie
- Ground clearance: 0.40 m
- Fuel capacity: 460 L 810 L - 900 L (with additional fuel tanks)
- Operational range: Road: 280 km (170 mi); 400 km (250 mi) (with additional fuel tanks); Cross-country: 140 km (87 mi); 200 km (120 mi) (with additional fuel tanks)
- Maximum speed: 55 km/h (34 mph) (road)

The SU-85 (Samokhodnaya ustanovka 85) was a Soviet self-propelled gun used during World War II, based on the chassis of the T-34 medium tank. Earlier Soviet self-propelled guns were meant to serve as either assault guns, such as the SU-122, or as tank destroyers; the SU-85 fell into the latter category. As with the other AFVs in the SU series, the designation "85" refers to the vehicle's main armament, the 85 mm D-5T gun.

== Development history ==
Early in World War II, Soviet tanks such as the T-34 and KV-1 had adequate firepower to defeat any of the German tanks then available. By the fall of 1942, Soviet forces began to encounter the new German Tiger tank, with armor too thick to be penetrated by the 76.2 mm guns used in the T-34 and KV tanks at a safe range. The Soviet command also had reports of the Panther tank, that was in development then and possessed thicker armor than the Tiger; both represented an advance in German tank design. Although the Panther was not seen in combat until July 1943, the new generation of German vehicles meant the Red Army would need a new, more powerful main gun for their armoured formations.

In May 1943, work was begun on a new anti-tank gun. Military planners directed the design bureaus of both Gen. Vasiliy Grabin and Gen. Fyodor Petrov to modify the 85 mm anti-aircraft gun for use as an anti-tank weapon. Petrov's bureau developed the D-5 85 mm gun. Though much too large for the T-34 or KV-1 turret, it was thought the gun could be mounted upon the chassis of the SU-122 self-propelled gun to give the weapon mobility. The version of this gun intended to be mounted upon the SU-85 was called the D-5S, with the "S" standing for self-propelled. Initially the production factory at Uralmash rejected the proposed design. Nevertheless, the administrators at Uralmash were persuaded to proceed, and the new design was put into production. The weapon was later modified to include a telescopic sight and a new ball gun mantlet. This vehicle was retitled the SU-85-II.

== Description ==
The SU-85 was a modification of the earlier SU-122 self-propelled howitzer, essentially replacing the 122 mm M-30S howitzer of the SU-122 with a D-5T high-velocity 85 mm antitank gun. The D-5T was capable of penetrating the Tiger I from 1000 m. The vehicle had a low profile and excellent mobility. Initially given an armored commander's cap on the first batch, the SU-85's observational optics were improved by the introduction of a standard commander's cupola - the same as on the T-34/76 model 1942 - in addition to the already existing prismatic observation sights installed in left side and rear. On later vehicles, the same optics were added, allowing all-around observation.

== Production history ==
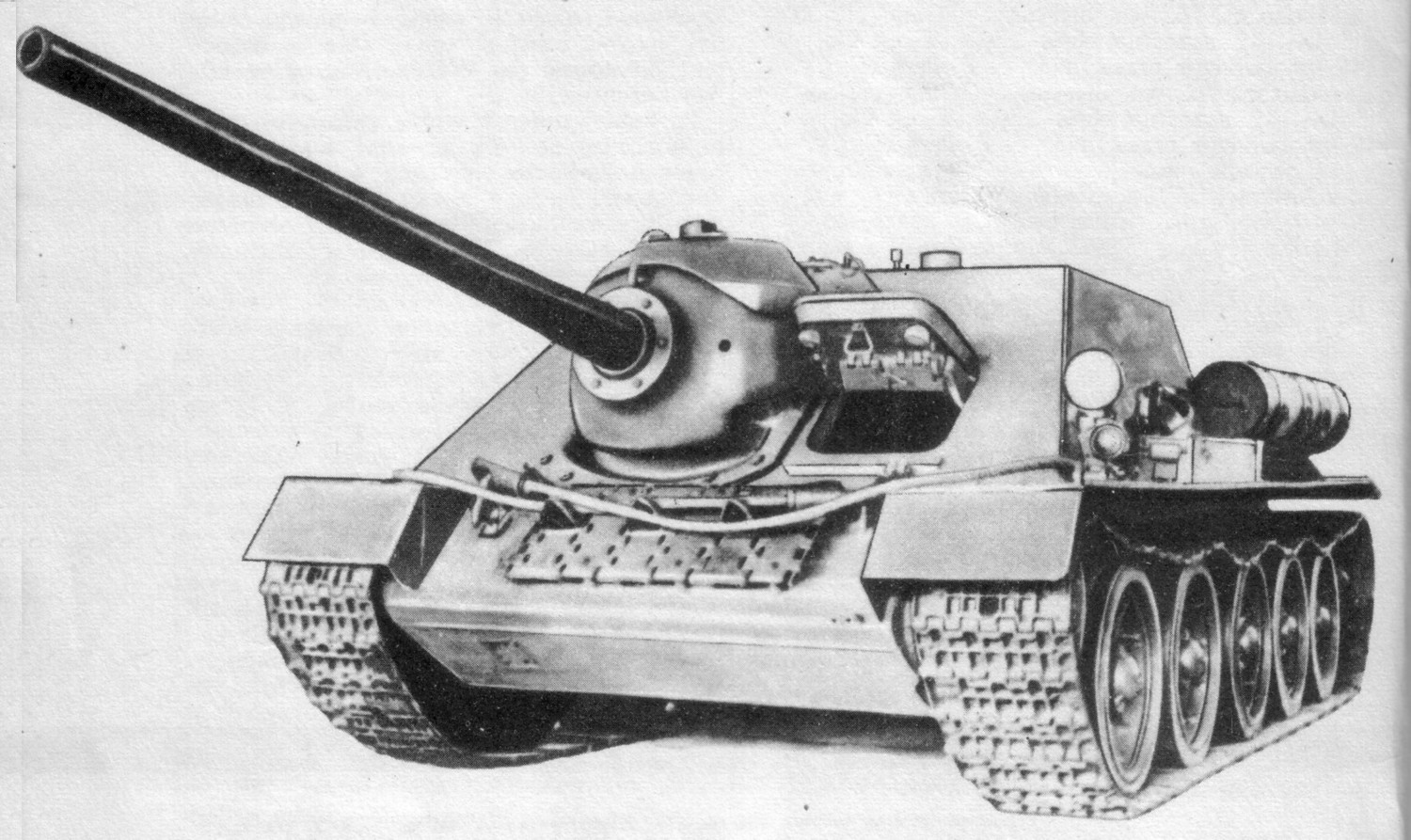
SU-85 (1944)

SU-85 production started in mid-1943, with the first vehicles reaching their units by August. When the up-gunned T-34-85 medium tank entered mass production in the spring of 1944, there was no point in continuing production of a tank destroyer without superior firepower. In light of this, SU-85 production was stopped in late 1944 after 2,650 vehicles had been produced. It was replaced on the production lines by the SU-100 tank destroyer, armed with the more powerful 100 mm D-10S gun, but due to delays with 100 mm ammunition, a stopgap version called the SU-85M appeared in September 1944, which was a factory SU-100 fitted with an 85 mm gun, along with thicker frontal armor and a prominent commander's cupola.

== Service history ==
The SU-85 entered combat in August 1943. It saw active service across the Eastern Front until the end of the war. Though a capable weapon, it was found that its 85 mm cannon was not adequate to penetrate the armour of the larger German armoured fighting vehicles, such as King Tigers. It was replaced by the SU-100.

The SU-85 was withdrawn from Soviet service soon after the war, and was exported to many Soviet client states in Europe and elsewhere. Some SU-85s were converted to use as command and recovery vehicles. Countries such as North Korea and Vietnam kept it in service for many years.

== Variants ==
=== Former Soviet Union ===
- SU-85 Basic version with four periscopes and no commander's cupola.
- SU-85M SU-100 hull fitted with 85 mm gun as a stopgap vehicle. 315 built.

=== Poland ===
- WPT-34 (1960s) - Polish repair and maintenance vehicle with a superstructure replacing the casemate, a crane, a large-diameter telescoping snorkel for deep fording operations as well as a large-spade type earth anchor in the rear. It was converted from SU-85 tank destroyers as well as T-34 medium tanks and SU-100 tank destroyers.

== Operators ==
- People's Republic of Bulgaria
- Czechoslovakia
- Hungarian People's Republic
- North Korea
- Polish People's Republic
- Romanian People's Republic – 26 armored recovery vehicles based on the SU-85 were received by 1 January 1956
- Soviet Union
- North Vietnam
- Yugoslavia
- East Germany from 1952/56 until 1962

== See also ==
- List of Soviet tanks - covers all periods
- ASU-85
- SU-100

=== Tanks of comparable role, performance and era ===
- Germany – StuG III, StuG IV and Jagdpanzer IV
- Italy – Semovente da 75/34
- Romania – Mareșal
- United Kingdom – SP 17pdr, A30 (Avenger)
- United States – M10 GMC

== Sources ==
- Perrett, Bryan (1987). Soviet Armour Since 1945, London: Blandford. ISBN 0-7137-1735-1.
- Zaloga, Steven J., James Grandsen (1984). Soviet Tanks and Combat Vehicles of World War Two, London: Arms and Armour Press. ISBN 0-85368-606-8.
