= SU-152 "Taran" =

Object 120 "Taran"
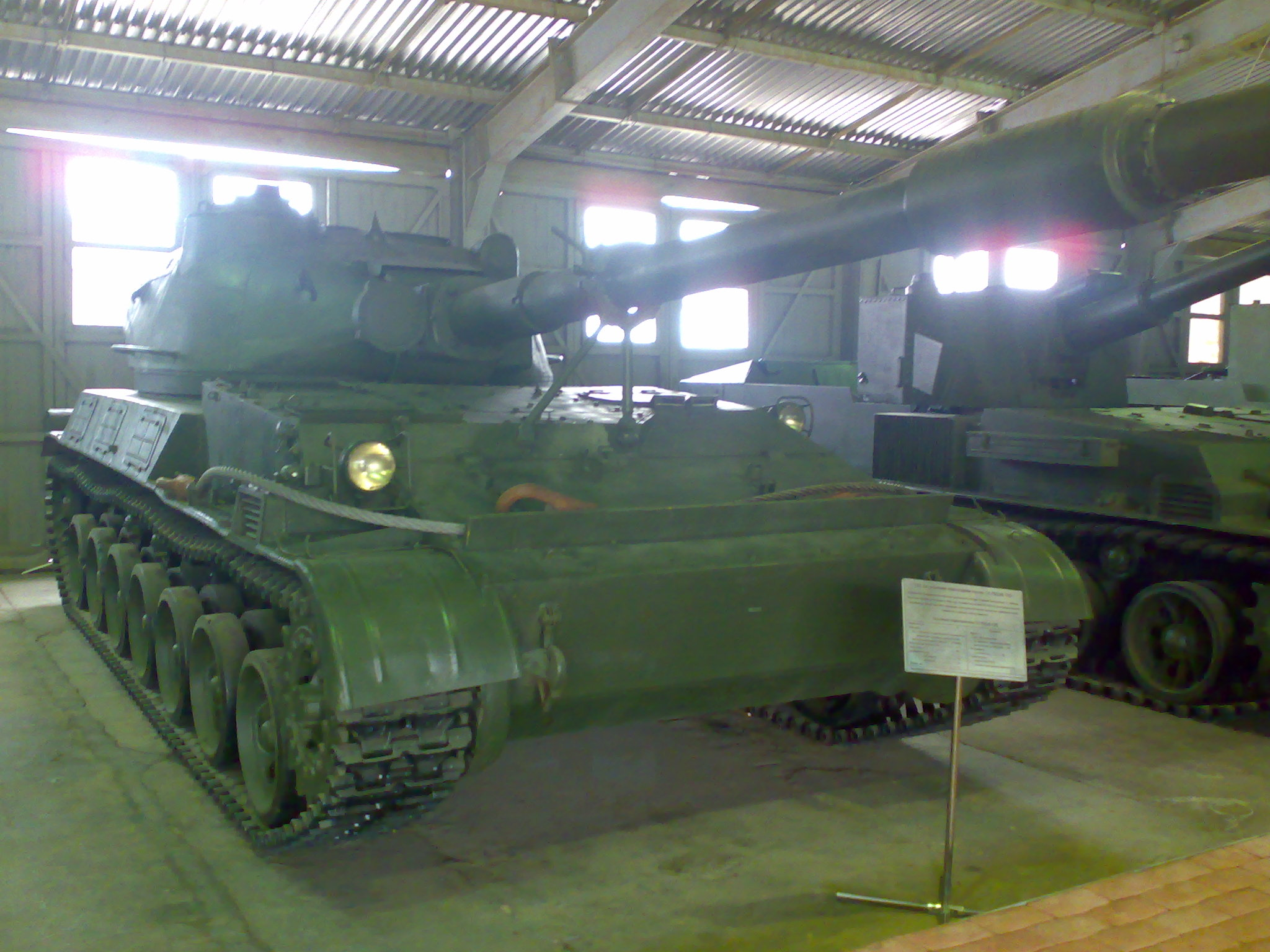
- The only prototype of the Object 120 at the Kubinka Tank Museum.
- Type: Tank destroyer
- Place of origin: Soviet Union

Production history
- Produced: 1965
- No. built: 1

Specifications
- Mass: 27 metric tons
- Length: 6.87 m (22 ft 6 in) (hull)
- Width: 3.12 m (10 ft 3 in)
- Height: 2.82 m (9 ft 3 in)
- Crew: 4
- Armour: 30 mm (hull front, turret front)
- Main armament: 152.4 mm M-69 "Taran" rifled gun (9.45m long barrel)
- Engine: V-54-105 diesel engine 353 kW (473 hp)
- Transmission: Mechanical
- Operational range: 280 km (173 mi)
- Maximum speed: 63 km/h (39 mph)

The Object 120 "Taran" (Russian: Объект 120 «Таран») was a fully enclosed Soviet tank destroyer built in 1965, which never progressed into serial or mass production.

== History ==
In the early 1960s, the Soviet military concluded that the armor-piercing ammunition used by the T-54 medium tank, and the T-10 heavy tank were getting unreliable at penetrating the frontal armor of the newest American M60 and British Chieftain and because rapid developments in NATO main battle tank armor were suspected, the Soviets began parallel research on several different anti-tank weapon systems, such as the development of new armour-piercing fin-stabilized discarding sabot and shaped charge ammunition for existing tank guns, new rifled and smoothbore tank guns with calibers ranging from 115 mm to 130 mm and anti-tank missiles for infantry and anti-tank missile carriers.

One of these projects became the Object 120 "Taran". The factory designation was Object 120 (Объект 120). In terms of firepower and mobility, it surpassed all foreign tank destroyers of the time. The main reason the Object 120 "Taran" wasn't adopted was due to the impracticality of a large caliber gun and the ongoing development and adoption of more cost effective 125 mm smoothbore tank gun and anti-tank missiles.

== Armament ==
The Object 120 "Taran" was armed with the 152.4 mm M-69 "Taran" rifled gun, with a barrel length of 9,045 mm, fitted with a powerful muzzle brake. With an overall length of about 10 meters, it is the longest gun of any type ever installed in a fully enclosed armoured fighting vehicle. The gun had a maximum direct fire range of 2,050 meters. The Object 120 "Taran" carried 22 rounds of APFSDS or high-explosive ammunition. The gun had a semi-automatic breech block, with a variable rate of fire of 3–6 rounds/min. The high-explosive ammunition had a 43.5 kg shell and a maximum charge of 10.7 kg. Firing the 12.5 kg APFSDS shell also had a maximum charge of 10.7 kg, which gave it a muzzle velocity of 1,720 m/s, the M-69 "Taran" had an armor penetration of 291 mm of RHA at 60°s at a range of 2,000 meters, or 507 mm at 0°s at a range of 2,000 meters.

== See also ==
- FV 4005 Stage 2, a similar experimental British design for a tank destroyer, armed with a 183 mm cannon
