= Lev Gorlitsky =

Lev Izrailevich Gorlitsky (Russian: Лев Израилевич Горлицкий) (3 March 1906 - 2 November 2003) was a Jewish Soviet weapons designer. Under the guidance of Gorlitsky special artillery pieces were designed to be mounted on T-34 self-propelled guns.

== See also ==
- List of Russian inventors
