= IS-4 =

1940s Soviet heavy tank

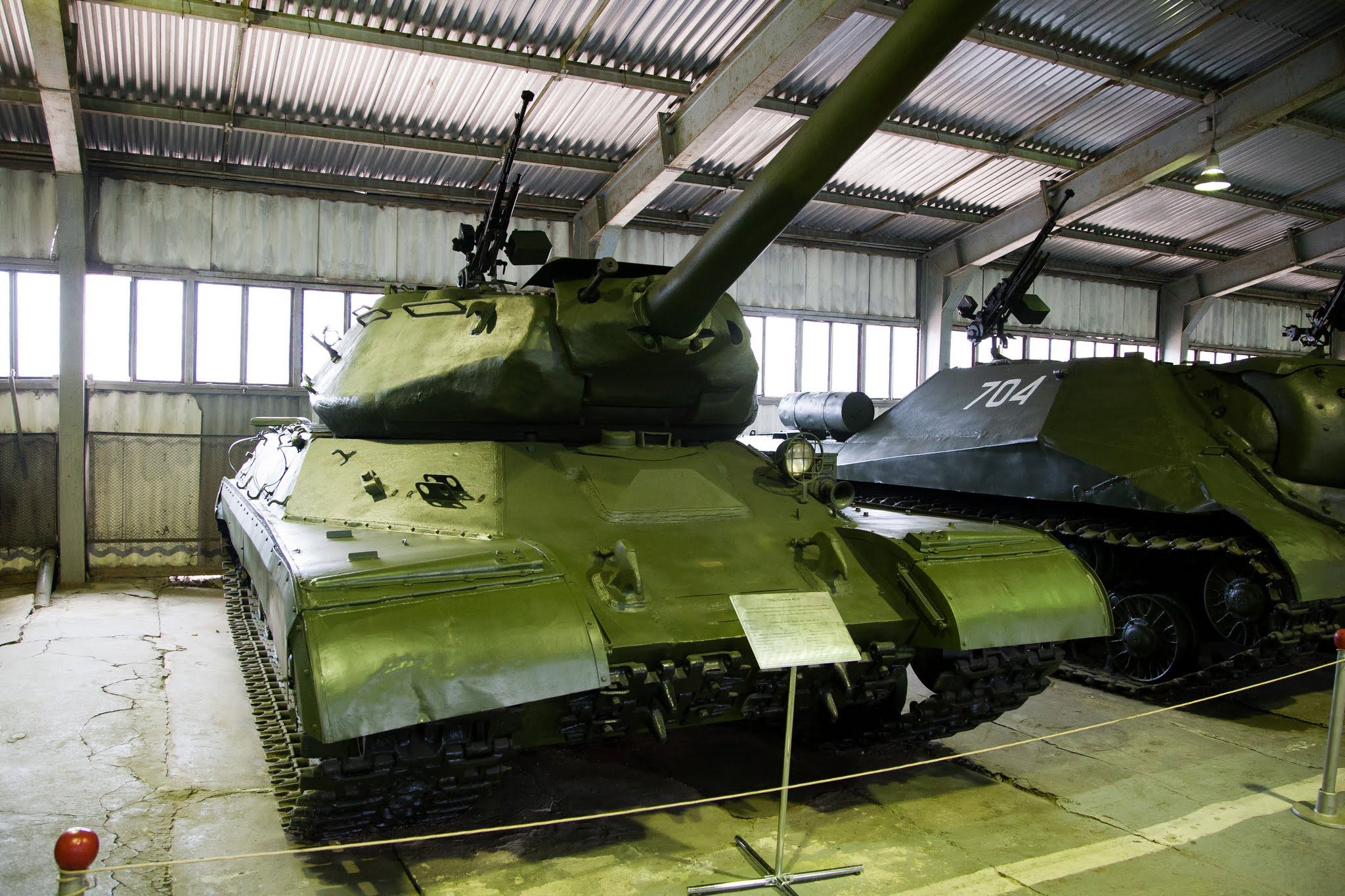
- An IS-4M at the Kubinka Tank Museum
- Type: Heavy tank
- Place of origin: Soviet Union

Service history
- In service: 1946-1970s (as pillboxes)
- Used by: See Operators

Production history
- Designed: 1944
- Manufacturer: CHKZ
- Produced: 1946-1949
- No. built: 200-<250

Specifications
- Mass: 130,000 lb (59,000 kg) (Combat)
- Length: 9.70 m (31.8 ft)
- Width: 3.26 m (10.7 ft)
- Height: 2.48 m (8 ft 2 in)
- Crew: 4 (Driver, Commander, Loader, Gunner)
- Armour: 30-250mm
- Main armament: 1x D-25T 122 mm gun (22 rounds)
- Secondary armament: 2 x 12.7mm DShK (1,000 rounds)
- Engine: V-12 Diesel; 750 hp @2,100 RPM
- Power/weight: 13hp/ton
- Suspension: Torsion bar suspension
- Fuel capacity: 410 L (90 imp gal; 110 US gal) (295/115 internal); 360 L (79 imp gal; 95 US gal) (4 external tanks)
- Operational range: 100 km (62 mi)-170 km (110 mi)100 km (62 mi)
- Maximum speed: 43 km/h (27 mph)
- Steering system: Speeds: 6 forward, 2 reverse

The IS-4, also known as the Object 701, was a Soviet heavy tank that started development in 1943 and began production in 1946. Derived from the IS-2 and part of the IS tank family, the IS-4 featured a longer hull and increased armor. With the IS-3 already in production, as well as the decreased need for tanks (particularly heavy tanks) and sluggish mobility, many were sent to the Russian Far East with some eventually becoming pillboxes along the Chinese border in the 1960s. Fewer than 250 were produced.

== Design and production ==
Development of the IS-4 started in November 1943 with the purpose of improving upon the IS-2 and incorporating captured enemy technology. This created a blend of IS-2 features and unique features not found in other Soviet tanks. The first variant IS-2 stepped front plate was judged to be a weak point and made into a single glacis with additional armor for the driver. This was in order to accomplish the IS-4 design parameters which included protection from the German 8.8 cm Pak 43 anti-tank gun. The side hull of the IS-4 is a simple angular step instead of angling out like the IS-3. The right side of the tank was fitted with clamp rings to carry an unditching log. The driver's position was described as cramped, though the writer of the review was taller than what was typical for tankers of the time.

The IS-4 track system is based on the IS-2 with an additional set of cast road wheels bringing the total to 7 pairs on a torsion bar suspension system. The IS-4 has bump stops similar to other torsion bar systems but notably does not have shock absorbers to stop rocking, relying instead on mass. The track is similar to others in the IS series, except it has a center guide on every track link instead of alternating ones. Each track is held in place by a single pin with a clip and washers. In the rear, each fender was able to hold two external 90-liter fuel tanks side by side. The rear also could hold an "MDH" ("Small Naval Generator") smoke generator which was equipped with a quick detach under the control of the driver who could activate it from inside the tank.

The IS-4 had a rear transmission system and a rear gun travel lock. The engine was a V12 which was an improvement over the V2 and fitted with a newly designed transmission and steering system capable of neutral steering. The IS-4 has two circular radiator fans externally identical to German World War II tanks, though internally different. It had two internal fuel tanks; the left 295 liters and the right 115 liters.

The turret resembles that of the IS-2 but also features components from the IS-3, a large access port to remove the cannon and a similar hatch layout. The commander was originally intended to have a rotating cupola similar to a late model M4 Sherman but this seems to have not been implemented. Unlike the IS-3, the IS-4 featured a dedicated bustle rack for ammunition in the rear of the turret. The IS-4 turret, with powered traverse, was noted by Nicholas Moran to be larger and roomier than the IS-3 turret, allowing for more ammunition for the coaxial machine gun. The IS-4 may have had an intercom system on the back of the turret to allow mounted infantry to talk with the tank crew.

Production started in 1946, too late for World War II. It was found to be overweight, and its original purpose (to fight against the Germans) was not needed anymore. Furthermore, the IS-3 was already in production, and for these reasons less than 250 were built. Most of them were transferred to the Russian Far East.

Later in the 1950s, a side skirt was added. In the early 1960s they were retired from service, with some serving on the Chinese border as pillboxes.

== Operators ==
USSR

- Soviet Army: Accepted into service on 29 April 1946

== Surviving vehicles ==
- Kubinka Tank Museum, Russia.

== See also ==
- IS tank family
- KV-1
- T-10
- ISU-122
- ISU-152
- List of Soviet tanks

=== Tanks of comparable role ===
- British Conqueror heavy tank
- French AMX 50 prototype heavy tank
- American M103 heavy tank
