= Fyodor Petrov =

Soviet artillery designer

Fyodor Fyodorovich Petrov (Russian: Фёдор Фёдорович Петров; 16 March 1902, Doktorovo, Tula Governorate – 19 August 1978, Moscow) was a Soviet artillery designer. Hero of Socialist Labour (1944). Lenin Prize (1967). Four Stalin Prizes first degree (1942, 1943, 1946 – twice).
