= Samokhodnaya Ustanovka =

Series of Soviet Self Propelled Guns

Samohodnaya Ustanovka (SU; Russian: самоходная установка, СУ, literally "Self-propelled installation") may refer to any of these Soviet self-propelled guns (including casemate self-propelled guns).

== List of vehicles ==
Vehicles with "SU" designations, sequential factory index (1920s to World War II-era) (Note: This does not include vehicles with other index types that is more used; Such as the SU-76M, which had the factory index SU-15.)

- SU-1 — SPG based on the T-26 tank, armed with a 76 mm regimental gun mod. 1927 in an armored casemate.
- SU-2 — SPG based on a Kommunar 9GU tractor, armed with a 76.2 mm divisional gun mod. 1902 behind an armoured shield, which could rotate 360°. It had a crew of 5. One was built in 1931 at the Bolshevik Factory.
- SU-3 — SPG using a T-27 tankette, armed with a 76 mm BKP-76 recoilless gun.
- SU-4 — SPG truck, using a GAZ-A truck, mounting a 76 mm BKP-76 recoilless gun.
- SU-5 — SPG based on a Kommunar 9GU tractor, armed with a 76.2 mm air-defense gun mod. 1915. It was developed in 1932 at the Bolshevik Factory. 1 built.
- SU-5 — A series of self-propelled guns. The design based on the T-26 tank with an open-top superstructure, equipped with different weapons.
  - SU-5-1 — Armed with the 76 mm divisional gun mod. 1902/30.
  - SU-5-2 — Armed with 122 mm howitzer mod. 1910/30.
  - SU-5-3 — Armed with 152 mm divisional mortar mod. 1931.
- SU-6 — SPG based on the T-26 tank with an open-top superstructure, armed with 76.2 mm air defense gun mod. 1931. The hull was wider and longer than a T-26, with an extra road wheel and folding armoured sides to protect the crew during transit.
- SU-7 — Heavy SPG with a 203 mm B-4 or 305 mm Br-18 howitzers, based on a special chassis developed at Factory No. 185, based on the T-35. Elements of the vehicle were built, but scrapped in 1937.
- SU-8 — An proposed SPG design on the chassis of the T-28 tank (never left design phase).
- SU-12 — SPG truck, using either a modified Moreland truck or GAZ-AAA truck. Armed with a 76 mm regimental gun mod. 1927 mounted on a shielded pedestal mount.
- SU-14 — Prototype heavy SPG built on a chassis with components from the T-28 and T-35 tanks.
  - SU-14-1 — Prototype heavy SPG built on a T-35 chassis.

Vehicles with "SU" designations, index based on tank/vehicle of origin (1920s to World War II-era)

- SU-18 — Self-propelled gun based on the T-18 tank (never left design phase).
- SU-26 (or SU-76P) — Self-propelled gun of an open-top design over a T-26 light tank chassis.

Vehicles with "SU" designations, gun caliber index (1920s to World War II-era)

- SU-57 — Soviet designation for lend-leased T48 Gun Motor Carriage.
- SU-76 (factory index SU-12) — A self-propelled gun used during and after World War II based to a modified T-70 chassis, with a rear-mounted casemate and an armored roof.
  - SU-76 (factory index SU-15M) — Commonly referred as SU-76M. An improved version rear-mounted partly-opened casemate. Main production model.
    - SU-85A — An elongated SU-76M with an 85mm D-5S-85A gun.
    - SU-85B — An improved SU-85A with 85mm LB-2 gun.
- SU-76 — Soviet designation for lend-leased M10 Gun Motor Carriage.
- SU-76i — An assault gun was based on the chassis of captured German Panzer IIIs and StuG IIIs.
- SU-85 — A tank destroyer used during World War II, based on the chassis of the T-34 medium tank.
- SU-100 — A tank destroyer armed with a powerful 100 mm anti-tank gun in a casemate superstructure over the chassis of the T-34 tank.
  - SU-122P — An SU-100 with a 122mm D-25S gun.
- SU-100Y — Prototype tank destroyer armed with a 130 mm naval gun mounted on the chassis of a T-100 tank.
- SU-122 — A self-propelled gun based on T-34 chassis armed with a 122mm M-30S howitzer.
- SU-2-122 — Self-propelled gun based on T-34 chassis armed with two 122mm M-30S howitzers.
- SU-122-44 — A tank destroyer over the T-44 chassis (never left design phase).
- SU-152 — A self-propelled heavy howitzer used during World War II over the KV-1S heavy tank chassis.

Vehicles with "ISU" designations

- ISU-122 — An assault gun based on the IS-2 chassis equipped with an A-19 122mm gun.
- ISU-130 — A tank destroyer based on the IS-2 chassis armed with an 130mm S-26 gun.
- ISU-152 — A self-propelled heavy howitzer used during World War II over the IS-2 heavy tank chassis.

Vehicles with "SU" designations (Cold War-era)

- SU-100P — An experimental self-propelled gun.
  - SU-152G — An experimental self-propelled howitzer based on the chassis of the SU-100P.
  - SU-152P — An experimental SPG.
- SU-122-54 — Self-propelled 122 mm gun, based on the T-54A.

Vehicles with "ASU" designations

- ASU-57 — A small, lightly constructed airborne assault gun of the Cold War Era
- ASU-76 — An experimental airborne assault gun
- ASU-85 — A Soviet-designed airborne self-propelled gun of the Cold War Era over the PT-76 light tank chassis.

Vehicles with unofficial "SU" or "ISU" designations

- Uralmash-1 (Unofficially: SU-101 / SU-102) — Experimental SPG design based on the T-44 chassis, equipped with either 100 mm D-10S or 122 mm D-25S, respectively.
- Object 704 (Unofficially: ISU-152 Model 1945; Also known as the Kirovets-2) — Prototype SPG developed in 1945, on the chassis of the Kirovets-1 (the initial prototype of the project that became the IS-3).
- Object 268 (Unofficially: ISU-152-10) — An experimental self-propelled heavy howitzer over the T-10 heavy tank chassis
- Object 120 (Unofficially: SU-152 "Taran") — A prototype turreted tank destroyer armed with a 152mm M69 cannon.

== Zenitnaya Samokhodnaya Ustanovka ==
Zenitnaya Samokhodnaya Ustanovka (Russian: зенитная самоходная установка - ЗСУ, lit. Zenithal (anti-aircraft) self-propelled installation), a subcategory of SU, May refer to any of these SPAAWs:

- ZSU-23-4 Shilka — A radar-guided self-propelled anti-aircraft weapon over the GM chassis.
- ZSU-37 — A World War II-era SPAAG on a modified SU-76 chassis.
- ZSU-37-2 Yenisei — A self-propelled anti-aircraft weapon developed in tandem with the Shilka.
- ZSU-57-2 — A self-propelled anti-aircraft weapon, and later light tank, over the T-54 medium tank chassis.

== See also ==
- List of armoured fighting vehicles by country § Soviet Union
- List of armored fighting vehicles of the Soviet Union
