= Uralmash-1 =

Uralmash-1 (SU-101 / SU-102)
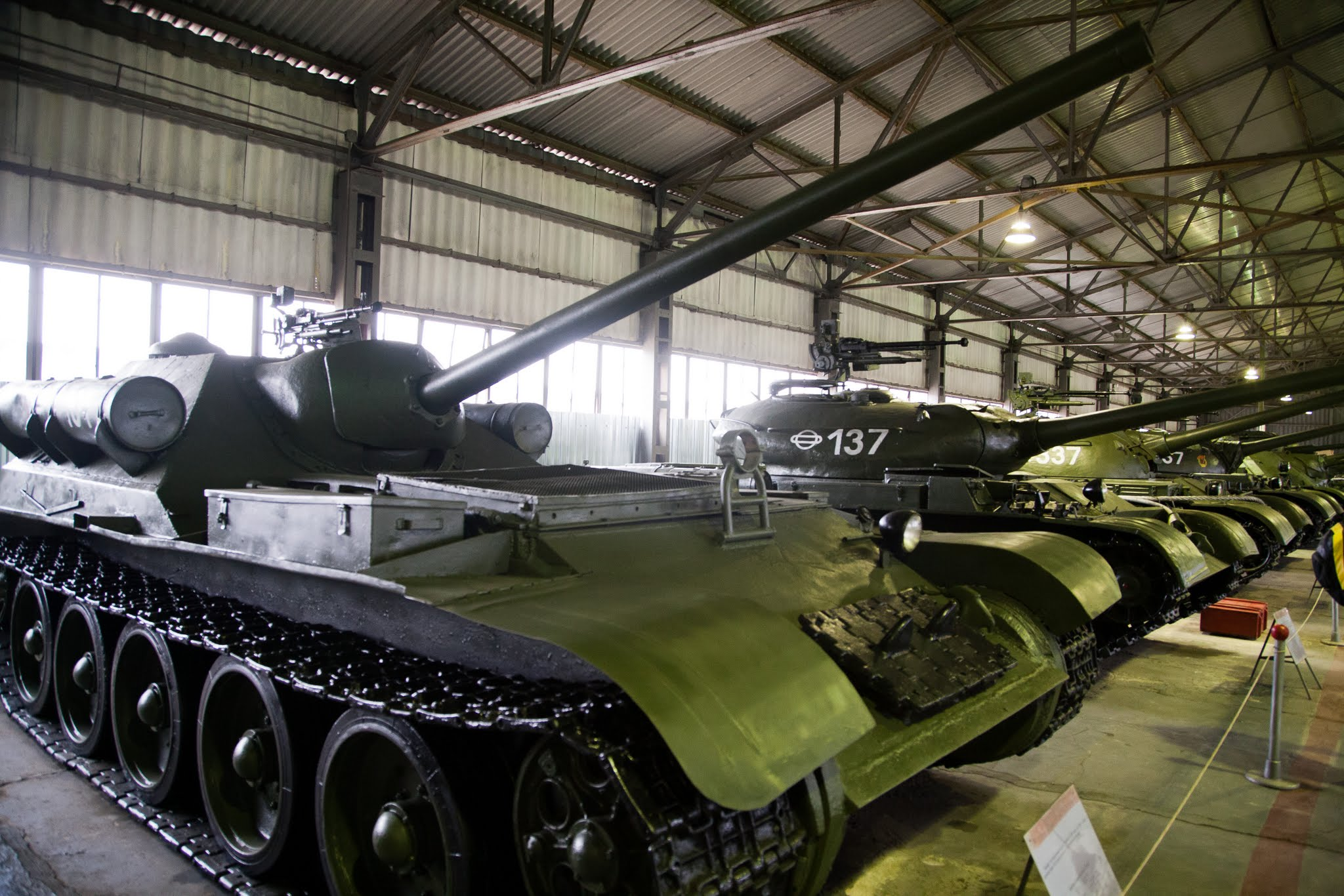
- SU-101 in Kubinka Tank Museum
- Type: Self-propelled gun (prototype)
- Place of origin: Soviet Union

Production history
- Designer: Uralmash design bureau
- Designed: 1944-1945

Specifications
- Mass: SU-101: 34.1 t (37.6 short tons; 33.6 long tons); SU-102: 34.8 t (38.4 short tons; 34.3 long tons)
- Crew: 4
- Armor: Front 90 mm / 27° Side 75 mm Rear 40 mm
- Main armament: SU-101: 100 mm D-10S; SU-102: 122 mm D-25S
- Secondary armament: 12.7 mm DShK AA machine gun
- Engine: V-2-44
- Suspension: Torsion bar
- Maximum speed: 54 km/h (33 mph)

The Uralmash-1 (Уралмаш-1) was a Soviet prototype self-propelled gun developed during World War II. It was a turretless, tracked armoured fighting vehicle designed by the Yekaterinburg-based Uralmash design bureau (UZTM) between autumn 1944 and spring 1945. It used the chassis of the T-44 medium tank and was intended to replace the SU-100 which itself had only entered service with the Red Army in late 1944. Two prototypes of the Uralmash-1 with different armament were built in early 1945, one with the 100 mm D-10 tank gun, the other with the 122 mm D-25S tank gun. While mass production was initially recommended, the end of the war with Germany in May 1945 eventually caused the project to be cancelled due to lack of necessity. If the Uralmash-1 had entered service, the 100 mm variant would have been designated SU-101 (СУ-101) while the 122 mm variant would have been designated SU-102 (СУ-102), in accordance with Soviet military nomenclature, where the "SU"-label stood for Samokhodnaya Ustanovka, or self-propelled gun.

== Development history ==
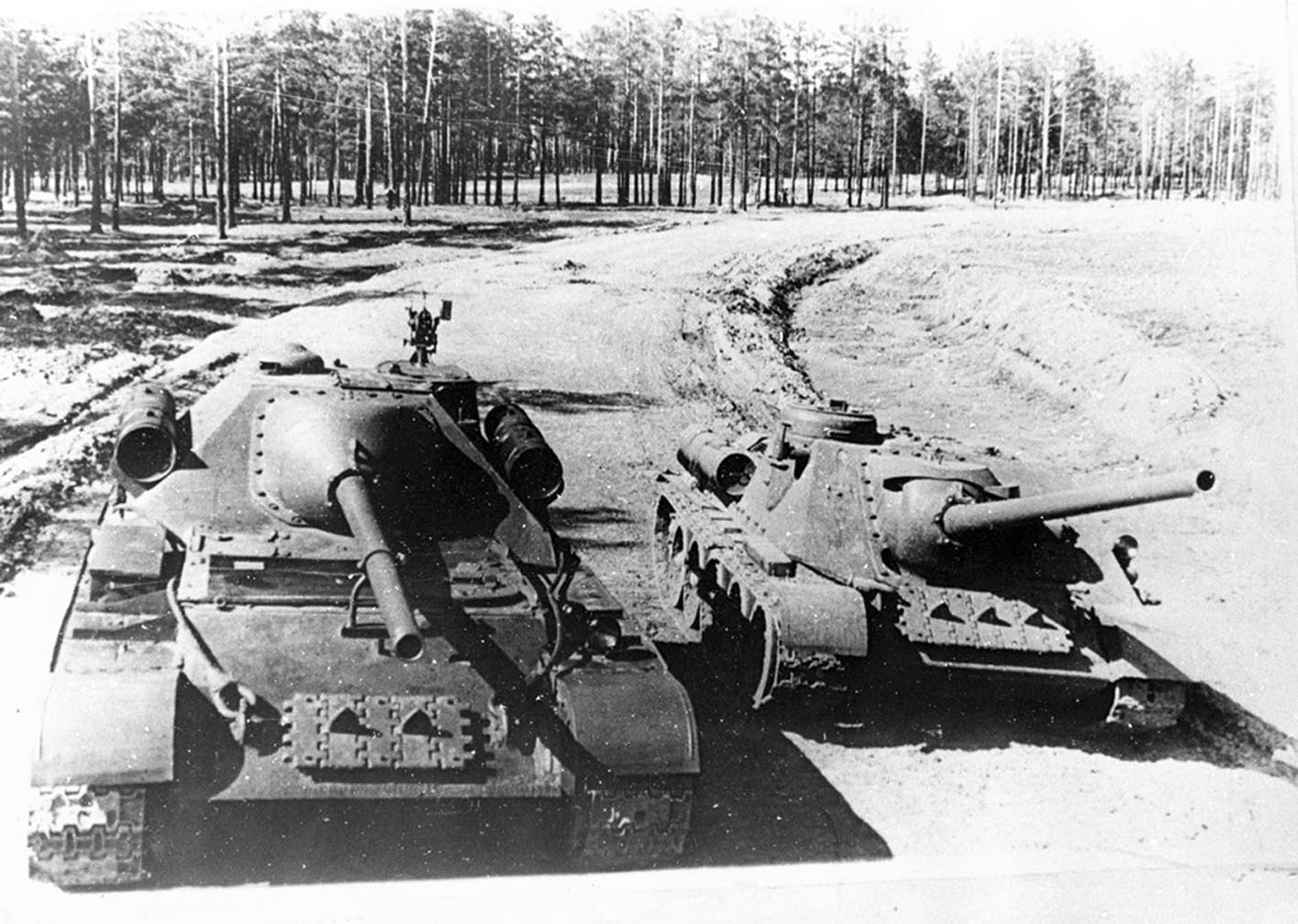
SU-101 and SU-100

Work on the SU-101 and SU-102 at the Uralmash design bureau had basically started parallel to the creation of the SU-100, in summer 1944. While the latter, based on the chassis of the T-34 medium tank, proved satisfactorily in combat, its basic layout with crew compartment in the front and engine in the back was considered a flaw. The lowly mounted gun protruded far from the vehicle's front, which resulted in cumbersome maneuverability in urban or forested areas and could cause problems in undulating terrain, where the vehicle could potentially ram its own muzzle into the ground if not driven carefully. Additionally, the SU-100 was very front heavy, which resulted in excessive stress on the forward road wheels, risking mechanical failure. Should the need for upgrading the vehicle with a bigger and heavier gun arise, all these problems were expected to be massively exacerbated.

To address these deficiencies, UZTM designer N.V. Kurin had developed a number of preliminary designs of new self-propelled guns, using the chassis of different contemporary Soviet tanks, both with crew compartment in the front and in the back. In October 1944 the bureau offered five projects to the technical review board of the Commissariat of Heavy Industry for further examination:

- SU-122P, a regular SU-100 equipped with the 122 mm D-25S gun.
- ESU-100, a regular SU-100 with an electric transmission.
- SU-100-M-1, armed with the 100 mm D-10S gun, based on the chassis of the T-34 tank, with a rear fighting compartment.
- SU-100-M-2, armed with the 100 mm D-10S gun, based on the chassis of the T-44 tank, with a rear fighting compartment.
- SU-122-44, armed with the 122 mm D-25-44S gun, based on the chassis of the T-44 tank, with a forward fighting compartment.

The technical review board recognized the SU-100-M-2 and the SU-122-44, both based on the new T-44 medium tank, as the most promising ones, and by order of directive № 625 to the tank industry, dated October 26, 1944 to the plant of UZTM, ordered the finalization of the design, distribution of the technical drawings and preparation of one prototype each.

While the SU-100-M-2 proved to be compact and light enough for a medium tank chassis as well sufficiently armoured, the SU-122-44 soon emerged as too big and too heavy. Thus, on March 7, 1945, by the commissariat's order № 107, all work on the SU-122-44 was terminated, whereas the SU-100-M-2 was redesignated as Uralmash-1 and the production of a first prototype by May 1, 1945 was ordered. The designation Uralmash-1 had already been used for a different self-propelled gun design in August 1943, but that design had not been approved by the commissariat and was frozen at that time.

In March and April 1945, two prototypes were built, one equipped with the 100 mm D-10 tank gun (to be designated SU-101 when inducted into actual service), the other with the 122 mm D-25S tank gun (to be named SU-102). Additionally, a third, empty, hull was made for armour tests under life fire circumstances.

While the war with Germany had already ended in May 1945, the prototypes were for the time being further tested by the UZTM design bureau during summer and autumn 1945. Several problems emerged, among them was the heating up of the vehicle's interior due to insufficient engine cooling. This was especially severe in the case of the driver, who was seated next to the engine and whose working station heated up to unbearable temperatures in summer. Another problem emerging was the very crammed and uncomfortable crew compartment. Finally, the SU-102 prototype faced structural problems, being not entirely suitable for absorbing the recoil of the powerful 122 mm gun. Yet these issues were deemed solvable and the vehicles were recommended for mass production after application of several modifications to address the prototypes' problems. Eventually, however, the end of World War II finally led to the conclusion that the vehicles had by now become unnecessary, and in the end, the production of the SU-101 and SU-102 was terminated before it began.

The SU-101 prototype survived and is now preserved in the Kubinka Tank Museum in Moscow, where it is displayed as an indoor exhibit.

== Design characteristics ==
The Uralmash-1 was a turretless casemate vehicle with a flat engine compartment in the front and a boxy elevated crew compartment in the rear, mounted on a suspension taken directly from the T-44 medium tank. The main gun protruded from the crew compartment and arched over the vehicle's engine. Thus, even a long-barreled gun only slightly increased the overall vehicle length, improving maneuverability and eliminating one of the SU-100's major deficits. This layout was referred to as of the Ferdinand sort ("по типу Фердинанда") in internal Soviet documents, referencing the German heavy tank destroyer Ferdinand faced by Soviet forces at that time, which was built in a similar fashion. The layout also spread the vehicles weight more evenly among the road wheels, addressing the mechanical issues faced by the front heavy SU-100.

The crew of 4 consisted of vehicle commander, gunner, loader and driver. While the driver was seated in the front left side of the vehicle next to the engine, the rest of the crew was placed in the crew compartment around the main gun in the rear. Access to the vehicle was provided by a door in the rear of the vehicle. This additionally increased crew survivability, as in the case of an emergency evacuation the crew could exit the vehicle without exposing themselves to enemy fire as much as an evacuation through the roof hatches would require.

The Uralmash-1's hull was made from plates of rolled homogeneous armour, welded together in a sloped fashion to give it improved protection. The frontal plates had a thickness of 90 mm, the sides 75 mm and the rear 40 mm. During firing tests with the empty hull, the vehicle's protection proved to be superior to the much heavier ISU-152 tank destroyer as well as the IS-2 heavy tank.

The SU-101 prototype with the 100 mm D-10S gun came with a combat loadout of 35 rounds. While the horizontal gun traverse at 22.5° and the vertical elevation at 18° were entirely sufficient, the engine compartment limited the gun depression at a very meagre −2°, almost eliminating the vehicle's ability to go hull-down. The bigger 122 mm D-25S gun of the SU-102 prototype, with 28 rounds of ammunition, was even more limited in its gun traverse, not being able to depress the gun further than 0.24° with an elevation of 18.5° and horizontal traverse of 19°. The very limited gun depression is one of the fundamental drawbacks of a rear-mounted gun layout.

The Uralmash-1's vehicle commander was additionally provided with a 12.7 mm DShK machine gun mounted in his roof hatch for use as an anti-aircraft weapon. The DShK ammunition loadout was 450 rounds.

The Russian designation "SU", meaning Samokhodnaya Ustanovka or self-propelled gun, is a rather diffuse term that was equally applied to vehicles which in combat fulfilled the roles of dedicated tank destroyers, infantry-supporting assault guns, and even indirect-fire artillery, i.e. self-propelled howitzers. The SU-101/SU-102 as a replacement for the SU-100, which was mainly used as tank destroyer, was potentially intended to fulfill the latter's role. The 100 mm D-10S of the SU-101 was a dedicated tank gun with capable kinetic energy armour-piercing rounds. The 122 mm D-25S of the SU-102 against that had originally been developed as an artillery howitzer to be used with high explosive rounds. However, in the course of the war, the gun had also proved to be a very effective anti-tank weapon, capable of knocking out even heavy German tanks, and armour-piercing kinetic energy ammunition had been developed to augment this battlefield role. As such the gun was already in use with the heavier ISU-122 tank destroyer.
