= SU-57 (disambiguation) =

The Sukhoi Su-57 is a multirole fighter aircraft.

SU-57, Su-57, or Su57 may also refer to:

- T48 Gun Motor Carriage, a United States WWII self-propelled anti-tank gun designated as SU-57 (Samokhodnaya ustanovka 57) under Soviet service under lend-lease
- ItPsv SU-57, the Finnish designation for the Soviet ZSU-57-2 self-propelled anti-aircraft gun
