= SU-122-44 =

- Type: Self-propelled gun
- Place of origin: Soviet Union

Production history
- Designer: Uralmash design bureau
- Designed: 1944–1945

Specifications
- Crew: 4
- Armor: Front 90 mm / 27° Side 75 mm Rear 40 mm
- Main armament: 122 mm D-25S
- Secondary armament: 12.7 mm DShK AA machine gun
- Engine: V-2-44
- Suspension: Torsion bar
- Maximum speed: 54 km/h (34 mph)

The SU-122-44 was a Soviet self-propelled gun (SPG) designed in early 1944 with a 122 mm (4.8 in) D-25S gun, with its fighting compartment situated at the front of the hull. The "44" in its name referred to the T-44 tank which the design was based on. The front had a sloped 90 mm (3.5 in) armor plate, inclined at 27 degrees. The side armor was 76.2 mm (3.00 in) thick, and the rear was 45 mm (1.8 in) thick. The design was found to be too heavy for the chassis; its competitor, the SU-100-M-2, proved a superior design, and on March 7, 1945, no prototype was built

== See also ==
- Uralmash-1
