= T-44 =

Soviet medium tank

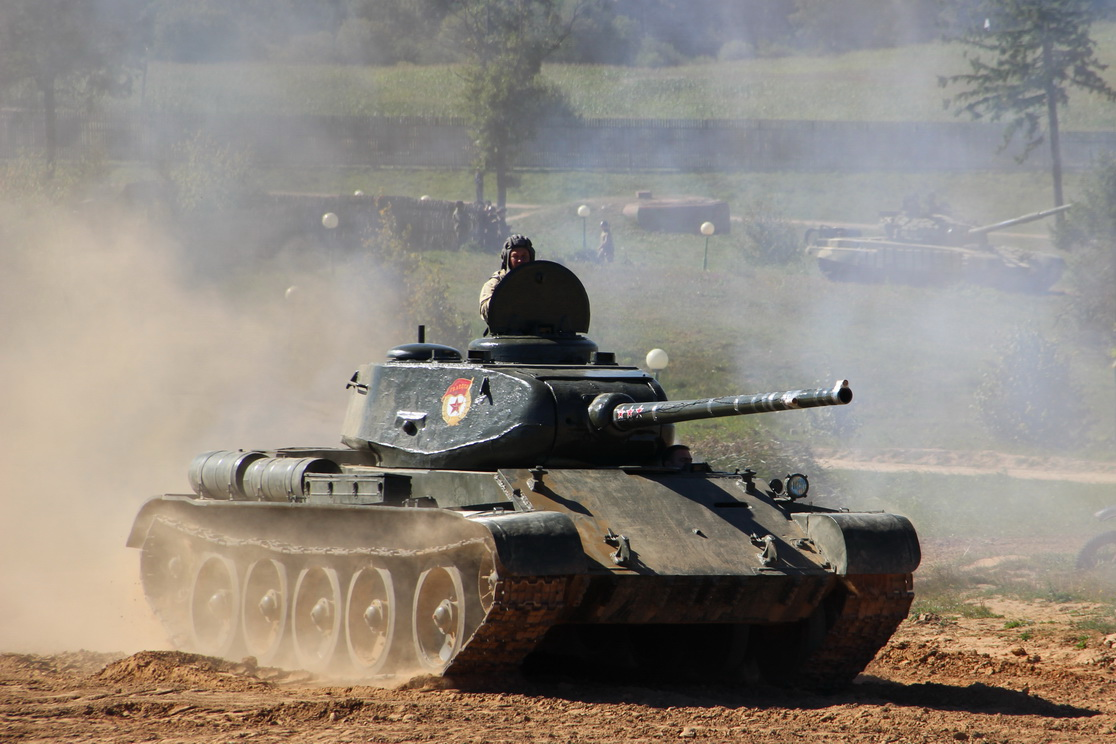
- A restored T-44 tank
- Type: Medium tank
- Place of origin: Soviet Union

Service history
- In service: 1944 – 1960s
- Used by: Soviet Union
- Wars: Hungarian Revolution of 1956; World War II (August 1945, Manchuria only)

Production history
- Designer: A.A. Morozov
- Designed: 1943–1944
- Manufacturer: Factory No. 75, Kharkov
- Produced: 1944–1947
- No. built: 1,823
- Variants: T-44-100, T-44-122

Specifications (T-44A)
- Mass: 32 t (35 short tons; 31 long tons)
- Length: 6.07 m (19 ft 11 in); 7.65 m (25.1 ft) over gun
- Width: 3.25 m (10 ft 8 in)
- Height: 2.455 m (8 ft 0.7 in)
- Crew: 4
- Armour: 120 mm (4.7 in)
- Main armament: 85 mm ZiS-S-53 tank gun (58 rds.) 100-mm D-10T tank gun 100-mm LB-1 tank gun 122-mm D-25-44 tank gun
- Secondary armament: 2× 7.62 mm DTM machine gun or 1x 12.7mm DshK
- Engine: Model V-44 12-cyl. 38.88 L diesel 520 hp (388 kW)
- Power/weight: 16.3 hp/tonne
- Transmission: planetary 5-speed manual
- Suspension: Torsion bar
- Ground clearance: 510 mm (20 in)
- Fuel capacity: 500 litres (110 imp gal; 130 US gal); 150 litres (33 imp gal; 40 US gal) external
- Operational range: Road: 240–300 km (150–190 mi) Cross-country: 150–210 km (93–130 mi)
- Maximum speed: 55 km/h (34 mph)

The T-44 was a medium tank developed and produced near the end of World War II by the Soviet Union. It was the successor to the T-34, offering an improved ride and cross-country performance, along with much greater armor. Designed to be equipped with an 85 mm main gun, by the time it was fully tested the T-34 had also moved to this weapon. Both tanks offered similar performance, so introducing the T-44 was not considered as important as increasing T-34 production. Fewer than 2,000 T-44s were built, compared to about 84,000 T-34s. Although the T-44 was available by the end of the war, it was not used in any battle. It was 1 ton lighter than the T-34-85 and slightly faster. The T-44 was heavily influential on the design of the T-54/55 Medium tank, most prominently lower hull and turret profiles. Also notable was the T-44-100, a 100mm D-10T-armed prototype, which would be the same 100mm gun mounted on the T-54/55, bar some minor changes.

Attempts were made to improve the T-44's armament with a new 122mm gun, but the turret proved to be very cramped and the rate of fire was poor, on the order of three rounds per minute. Design work on a slightly enlarged version of the T-44 began during the war and a prototype was produced in 1945. This newer design entered production in 1947 as the T-54/55 series of medium tanks, the most-produced tank series of all time.

== Development history ==
=== Genesis ===
By the end of 1940, when production of the T-34 started, there were already plans to improve the vehicle's reliability and operational capabilities by adopting more modern technology.

This design project was designated T-34M. It had enhanced armour protection, a three-man hexagonal turret, torsion bar suspension instead of Christie suspension, road wheels with internal shock absorption, increased fuel capacity, and more main gun ammunition (100 rounds instead of 77 in standard T-34). The bow machine gun and driver's hatch switched positions on the glacis plate. In addition to six smaller wheels, the suspension of the T-34M had four return rollers. The original model V-2 12-cylinder diesel engine developing 500 hp (373 kW) was replaced by a new 12-cylinder diesel engine which produced 600 horsepower (450 kW). It had a new 8-speed transmission system. It was the first tank design to feature transverse engine placement, which made it smaller than a standard T-34 and gave the crew more space.

The Zhdanov Metallurgical Factory manufactured five sets of armour plates for the hull of the T-34M and delivered them to Factory No. 183. However, early in 1941 work on the T-34M ceased as the production facilities were extremely busy with the mass production of the T-34. When the war with Nazi Germany broke out the only sensible solution was to gradually improve the existing design.

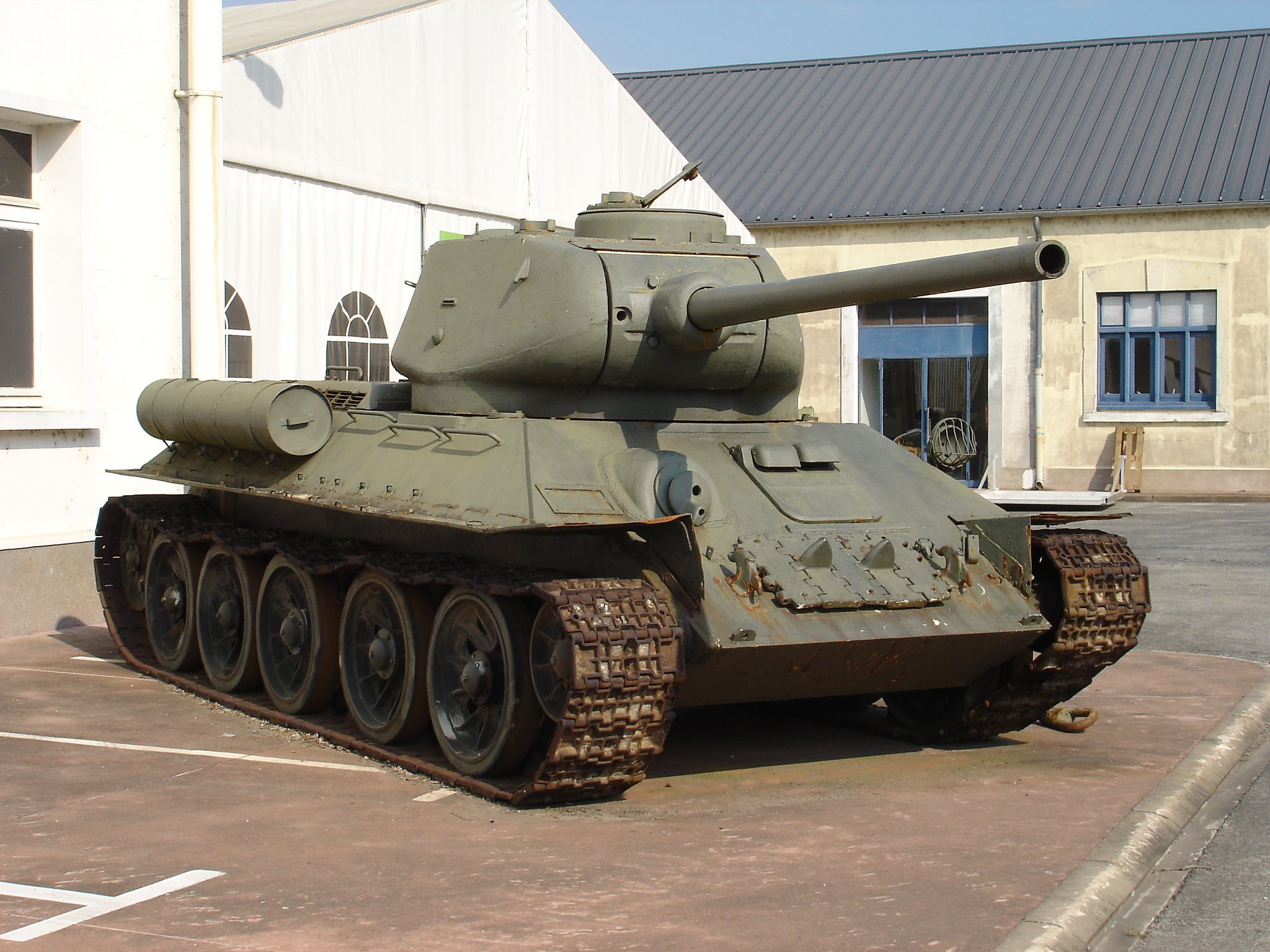
T-44's predecessor, the T-34-85

During the battles on the Eastern Front it became apparent that the Red Army needed a new medium tank. They requested that it should have better protection at a minimal increase of weight. In 1942 the T-43 tank design project began. It featured a new turret and shorter suspension which reduced the clearance between the roadwheels. However, it concentrated on increasing armour at a time when maintaining production and increasing firepower were more important. The T-43 was cancelled, but its new turret design was adapted to carry a larger 85mm D-5T and later ZiS-S-53 gun in a new variant called the T-34-85. It marked the end of T-34 improvements as fitting 100mm guns in T-34-100 prototypes proved unfeasible. (See T-34 variants article for details).

=== Prototypes ===
==== First generation ====
In the autumn of 1943 the design bureau of the Stalin Ural Tank Factory No. 183, located in Nizhny Tagil (in the Ural Mountains, where most of the Soviet tank industry had been evacuated after Operation Barbarossa in 1941), started working on a vehicle that would have improvement opportunities in the future, under a direct order from Joseph Stalin. The intention was to retain the high mobility of the T-34 and provide it with heavier armour protection against modern tank guns. In November 1943, the chief designer, A. A. Morozov, presented the overall design of the vehicle and a model of the tank, which received the designation T-44 (Ob'yekt 136). The first prototype was completed by January 1944 and two more were completed in February. The first two prototypes were armed with 85mm D-5T guns and received the designation T-44-85, while the third prototype was armed with the 122mm D-25-44T tank gun and received the designation T-44-122. The D-25-44T tank gun was very similar to the basic D-25 field gun, but differed in some minor details including fixed single-piece ammunition to increase the rate of fire and a double-baffle muzzle brake. The penetration of the gun is disputed over whether the in battle or tested under conditions results should be used but in battle the penetration like previous model the T-34 the gun was unable to penetrate the expected amount of armor due to the powder used in the shells. What allowed fitting such powerful armament in a medium tank weighing 30 tonnes was the construction of the hull with an innovative placement of the engine. Unlike most tanks, in the T-44 the engine was placed perpendicular to the axis of the tank. The hull was designed without sponsons. It was also much wider which made the crew compartment bigger and allowed the turret to be placed over the center part of the vehicle. This reduced the overall length of the vehicle. The thickness of the armour was 75mm on the front of the hull and 90mm on the front of the turret. The side armour was 45 mm thick and could be reinforced by 30 mm thick additional armour plate. All three prototypes were powered by the V-2IS diesel engine which developed 500 hp (373 kW). This first generation of prototypes featured a raised cast driver's hatch with an opening vision flap as well as mounting bolts in a ring around the base of the gun tube.

Morozov's new medium tank design received a skeptical response. It was believed that putting a high-speed 12-cylinder engine with a working displacement of almost 40 liters perpendicular to the direction of travel would cause problems, including breaking the connecting rods. It was believed that decreasing the displacement of the engine compartment for the purpose of enlarging the fighting compartment was unnecessary and that moving the turret rearwards would limit the elevation angle of the main gun. However, it turned out that even though rotating the engine complicated the transmission by introducing an additional reduction gear - gear-train and fan drive, it also solved many problems. The cover of the engine and transmission compartment turned along with the radiator; this allowed easier access to the engine, transmission and batteries. The significant decrease in the length of the engine compartment allowed the turret to be moved rearwards, which in turn moved its rotation axis and the center of mass to the center of the hull, increased the accuracy of the main gun and decreased a chance that the turret could get stuck after getting hit in the turret ring with a projectile that ricocheted. The thickness of the frontal armor protection more than doubled without disturbing the center of mass or drastically increasing the weight of the tank. At the beginning of World War II the thickness of T-34 armor was considered enough. Improvements made to the T-34 during World War II included increasing the caliber of the gun (from 76.2 mm to 85 mm) and thickening the armor of the turret. No significant improvements were made to the hull. Increasing the size of the fighting compartment allowed the removal of floor ammunition stowage. The height of the tank was decreased by 300 mm, even though the turret remained almost the same. Removal of the conical pair in the transmission permitted fitting a more compact gear-box and improved the control of the brakes and the steering clutch. Visibility from the driver's position was improved. The driver was protected from being splashed by water while the vehicle was fording. The new torsion bar suspension allowed easier crossing of rough ground.

==== Second generation ====
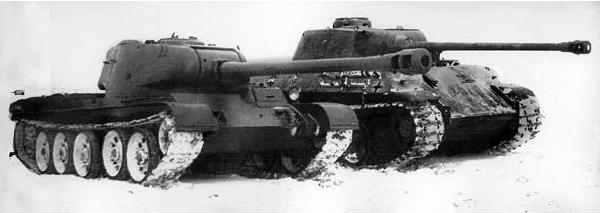
T-44-122 prototype during comparative trials against captured German Panther

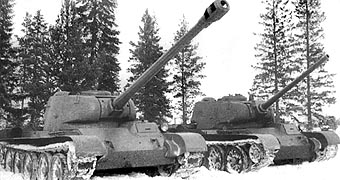
Second of the two first generation T-44-85 prototypes and T-44-122 prototype during comparative trials

The first trials of the T-44-122 prototype took place in February and March 1944, but were unsuccessful due to gun failure, and the gun was returned to the No. 9 factory for repair. In April and May 1944 the trials were resumed. Aside from standard trials, the T-44-122 was put in competitive trials against a captured German Panzerkampfwagen V Panther medium tank and the second of two first generation T-44-85 prototypes. The practical rate of fire was two to three rounds per minute due to the cramped turret and long, heavy ammunition. The vehicle had a very limited storage of only 24 rounds and this was considered insufficient for a medium tank. As a result, all further development of the T-44-122 prototype was cancelled.

Like the T-44-122 prototype, one of the two first-generation T-44-85 prototypes went through competitive trials against a captured German Panzerkampfwagen V Panther medium tank. The second of the two first-generation T-44-85 prototypes was put in competitive trials against the T-44-122 prototype. The second prototype uncovered additional faults in the design. By May 1944 two second-generation prototypes were being built. These featured the driver's position moved rearwards so that his hatch was partially on the hull roof. The driver's vision flap was reduced to a plain square flap with rounded lower corners, in line with the glacis plate. These prototypes had prominent collars at the base of the gun tube, without the mounting bolts which were present in the first generation prototypes. The two prototypes also have differences between each other. One prototype had a splashboard on the glacis plate while the other had a smooth uncluttered glacis plate. One of these prototypes passed trials at the NIBT proving grounds near Kubinka in June and July 1944. This prototype weighed 31.3 tonnes and was armed with an 85 mm ZiS-S-53 gun. The turret front armour thickness was increased to 115 mm. Hulls side armour thickness was increased to 75 mm.

=== T-44A ===
The third generation prototype, which received the designation T-44A, was completed after the Morozov Design Bureau had moved back to Kharkiv in Ukraine. The hull upper front armour (glacis plate) thickness was increased to 90 mm and the turret front armour thickness was increased to 120 mm. Even though it was more heavily armoured, the weight went down to 30.7 tonnes. This vehicle had a new V-44 12-cylinder 4-stroke diesel engine of 520 hp (388 kW) at 1,800 rpm, which allowed the tank to travel at a speed of 60.5 km/h. This prototype had the splashboard on the glacis plate like one of the second generation T-44-85 prototypes. This prototype featured some other differences from the earlier prototypes, including the fact that drivers hatch was moved entirely to the roof of the hull and the vision flap was deleted from the design and replaced by a vision slot in the glacis plate. After trials conducted in August and September 1944 and after it received several upgrades (which increased the weight of the vehicle to 32 tonnes), the T-44A officially entered service with the Red Army on the 23 November 1944, but did not see combat during World War II.

=== T-44-100 and T-54 ===
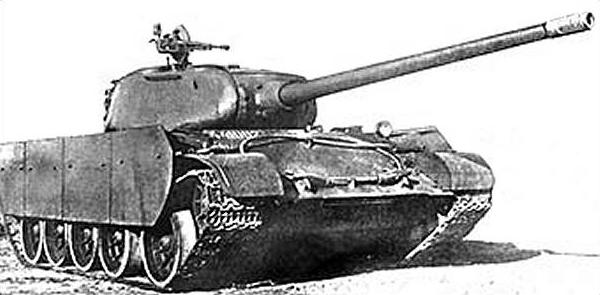
One of the two T-44-100 prototypes. The 100 mm gun, 12.7 mm DShK anti-aircraft heavy machine gun mounted on the loader's hatch and 6 mm thick anti-HEAT side-skirts protecting the sides are visible. This example does not have a splashboard on the glacis plate.

Even with its innovative technology and better armor protection the T-44A still used the same 85 mm ZiS-S-53 tank gun as fitted on the T-34-85 medium tank. The army needed a new tank armed with a more powerful 100 mm gun. At the end of 1944 the designers had three types of 100 mm guns at their disposal - the D-10 (which had already proved itself in combat use in the SU-100 tank destroyer) as well as prototypes of the ZiS-100 and LB-1 (LB stands for Lavrentiy Beria). The T-44 tank armed with the 100 mm tank gun originally received the designation T-44B. Two projects were started, both based on the T-44A. The development of the first one started in October 1944 at the design bureau of the Stalin Ural Tank Factory No. 183, located in Nizhny Tagil. The design stage was completed in December and the prototype was ready in February 1945. The trials conducted between March and April gave positive results and the vehicle eventually entered service with the Red Army as the T-54. The tank had almost the same hull and drive train as the T-44A. Differences included thickened front armour (120 mm on the upper section and 90 mm on the lower section) and a different hatch and vision slot for the driver. The turret had increased diameter to 1800 mm. There was thicker armour (180 mm on the front, between 90 mm and 150 mm on the sides and 30 mm on the roof). The armament included the 100 mm D-10TK tank gun as well as two 7.62 mm GWT machine guns. The tank was powered by a new V-54 12-cylinder 38.88 liter water-cooled diesel engine developing 520 hp (388 kW) at 2,000 rpm. The fuel capacity was increased (530 liters in the internal fuel tank and 165 liters in the external fuel tank). The external fuel tanks were connected to the fuel system. The rubber rollers on the roadwheels were widened. The weight was increased to 35.5 tonnes, which reduced the maximal road speed to 43.5 km/h. The maximal road operational range increased to 360 km. Because of positive results seen in trials, it was decided to modernize the tank before starting production (for more details about it see the T-54/55 article) as well as to put the new tank's turret onto two modified serial T-44A tanks. This was done in 1945 and the two prototype tanks received the designation T-44-100. One of the prototypes was armed with a D-10TK tank gun while the other one was armed with a LB-1 tank gun. Like the second generation T-44-85 prototypes, the two T-44-100 prototypes had differences between each other. One prototype had a splashboard on the glacis plate while the other did not. They both had the 12.7 mm DShK anti-aircraft heavy machine gun fitted to the loader's hatch, 6 mm thick anti-HEAT sideskirts protecting the sides and two cylindrical fuel tanks in the back which increased the fuel capacity to 1035 liters. These cylindrical fuel tanks were later used on Soviet main battle tanks as additional fuel tanks. Further development of the T-44 was canceled and all the attention was directed towards the development of the new T-54 main battle tank.

== Description ==
The T-44 had a typical tank layout: the driving compartment at the front, the fighting compartment in the middle and the engine compartment in the rear. The original intention was to retain the high mobility and speed of a T-34 and to provide the T-44 with heavier armour protection against large-caliber tank guns. This was accomplished by adding thicker armour but reducing the internal volume of the hull. The T-44 had a lower profile than the T-34, and was potentially simpler to manufacture. Although the T-44 used many components of the T-34, it had a new hull, and a modified model V-2 diesel engine, suspension and transmission.

Reflecting trends in other designs in this period, the T-44 was designed without the hull radio operator/machine gunner position present in many older designs. This was done for a number of reasons. The extensive machine gun firing port in the glacis plate (which was present in the T-34 medium tank) was a weak spot in the armour. In the T-34, this firing port and the driver's hatch were exploited during World War II by the Germans fighting the T-34s. Shooting the machine gun was ineffective as it was inaccurate due to obscured vision. It was considered inefficient to transfer reports through an additional member of the crew and therefore these duties were transferred to the commander. The space saved was used for a fuel tank and to increase the ammunition load. The driver's hatch was on the left side of the hull roof. The tank had an improved hull design, longer and wider than the T-34 but slightly lower thanks to the relocation of the air filter, with thicker armour, and was simpler to construct. The hull had a sloped glacis plate, vertical sides, and a slightly beveled rear. Most tanks had a splashboard on the glacis plate although there are pictures of T-44A tanks without them. It protected the upper part of the vehicle from splashes of mud or water. There were three mounts for rectangular stowage bins on the fenders (two on the right fender and one on the left fender). There were four mountings for cylindrical fuel tanks on the fenders (two per side). This was changed in the T-44M which used rectangular fuel cells.

During its service the tank proved to be not entirely adapted to winter conditions, due to an incomplete draining of the cooling system, caused by a water pump system that had been modified to reduce engine height. A small shaft would break after the impeller pump froze. The repair of the shaft, considering the field conditions, proved very impractical and required three people. Two people had to hold a third person by the legs and lower him into the engine bay, where he had to loosen the fastening and remove the broken shaft. Then, he was pulled out and lowered back down to install the new shaft. He was repeatedly lowered until the new part was secured. Another serious problem discovered during the winter conditions was that the crews of the T-44A suffered from frostbite because of the complete lack of a heating system. The driver was supposed to be protected from rain and snow by a removable Tarpaulin cover with a small glass window. However, this was not successful and its use was deemed impractical.

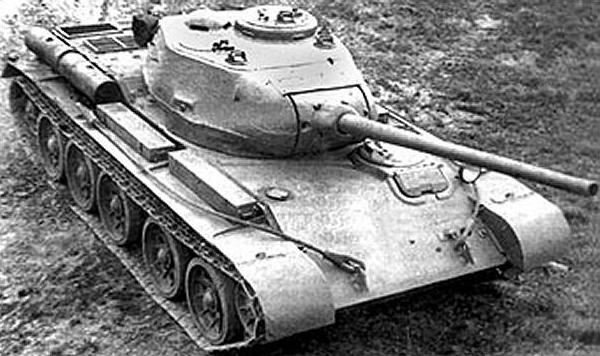
Second generation T-44-85 prototype during trials. This unit has no splashboard, and the gap between the second and third roadwheels.

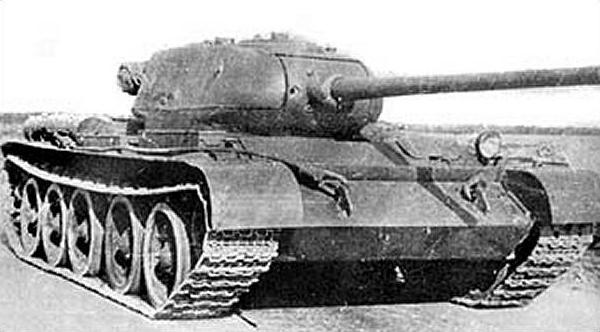
Second generation T-44-85 prototype during trials at NIBT proving grounds near Kubinka, summer 1944. Notice driver's vision flap was reduced to a plain square flap with rounded lower corners, in line with the glacis plate, a prominent collar at the base of the gun tube and the splashboard on the glacis plate.

The T-44 had a compact torsion-bar suspension instead of the T-34's Christie coil springs, although it retained the Christie method of engagement between the slotted drive wheel and track lugs. The suspension had five large spoked road wheels and 'dead' 500 mm wide track from the T-34. The hull and wheels were virtually identical to the early T-54 main battle tanks although the original T-44 had the T-34's 'spider' road wheels and a narrow, inset drive wheel at the rear. The T-44 was the last Soviet medium tank with paddle-type tracks. The mechanism for tensioning them was significantly better on the T-44 than it was on the T-34. On the T-34, the first two lug-nuts on the crank had to be loosened and then the crank pounded with a sledge hammer in order to separate it from the hull. After the track was tensioned, the crank had to be set back in place with a sledge hammer. The whole process required up to three people. On the T-44, the same task could be carried out by one person, without the help of a sledge-hammer. The roadwheels were spaced evenly from each other except for a prominent gap between two of the roadwheels. The T-44-85 and T-44-122 prototypes had a gap between the second and third roadwheels like in the T-34 but the T-44A had a gap between the first and second roadwheels. This arrangement of wheels was continued in the T-54 and T-55 main battle tanks. The roadwheels sometimes started to 'fall home' after 2,500 km. To increase the service life of the road wheel, a slight camber of the paired road wheels was tried. However, this resulted in greater stress on the outer rollers. When the tank crosses 20 km of rough ground it can pick up about a ton of dirt along the way.

The new V-44 12-cylinder 4-stroke diesel engine, developing 520 hp (388 kW) at 1,800 rpm, was a more powerful version of the T-34's model V-2 with a new planetary manual 5-speed transmission system, filtration system, improved cooling system, horizontally placed water and oil pumps and an improved fuel system which increased its power output, although the tank retained the side clutches from the T-34. The new engine gave the T-44 a maximal road speed of 53 km/h and maximal cross country speed of 20 km/h to 25 km/h as well as maximal road range of 350 km. The engine could become worn out after the tank traveled 3,000 km. When that happened, the oil pressure would drop to 2-3 atmospheres and under heavy loads, the engine would start smoking, spewing out black smog out of the side of the tank. The engine deck had two transverse ventilation grilles at the rear. The exhaust port was on the rear left hand side of the hull. The tank could cross 1 m high vertical obstacles, 2.5 m wide trenches, 32° side slopes and 60° gradients and ford 1.3 m deep water obstacles without preparation.

Because driver's hatch was moved from the glacis plate and positioned so that he exited the vehicle perpendicularly instead of crawling out of the hatch, his seat received an elevating mechanism. While in a relatively safe area the driver could elevate his seat to look outside of the tank, providing greater visibility and easier access to the controls. While in combat the driver lowered his seat back into the tank and had to rely on the vision slot protected by triplex (three-layer glass). While in this position the pedals of the main clutch, the fuel supply, and incline brake were positioned much higher and the levers of the steering clutch and gear shifting became inconvenient to operate. Early examples had transmission problems. While the driver was switching gears, two gears could engage simultaneously, which caused a broken gear pinion. This and other gearbox related problems were solved in a 1961 T-44M modernization with the introduction of a gearbox from the T-54 main battle tank.

T-44A was armed with an 85mm ZiS-S-53 tank gun as well as two 7.62mm DTM light machine guns. One of these machine guns was mounted to fire through a tiny hole in the center of the glacis plate. Because the tank's crew did not include a radio operator/machine gunner, the driver operated this light machine gun. The gun was mounted in a fixed position and could only be aimed by turning the tank. The main gun was placed in a centrally placed turret along with a coaxially mounted 7.62 mm DTM light machine gun. The ZiS-S-53 tank gun could penetrate around 100 mm of armour at range of 1000 m. The gun could be elevated or depressed between -5° and +25°. It wasn't stabilized. Like in the T-34 and the SU-76 SPG, hot cartridge-cases were rolling under the feet of the crew. The crew was also subjected to gases from the main gun every time after it was fired. The tank carried 58 rounds for the 85 mm ZiS-S-53 tank gun and 1890 rounds for 7.62 mm DTM light machine guns.

The turret was cast, with a prominent horizontal casting seam, shaped like an elongated hexagon, with sloped sides and overhang all around. It resembled a longer, better armoured T-34-85 turret. It had a cast gun mantlet with a small but prominent ring/collar around the base of the tank gun tube. The turret roof had a raised commander's cupola on the left and loader's hatch on the right with a low dome-shaped ventilator behind it. The turret was moved with an electric motor. The front armour of the turret was 120 mm thick while the side armour was 75 mm thick.

The hull was made of rolled welded steel. The glacis plate was 90 mm thick while the side armour was 75 mm and the bottom armour was 20 mm thick. T-44 tanks could be fitted with additional 30 mm thick armour plates on the sides of the hull and the turret. Additional spaced armour panels could be fitted to the sides of the hull.

The T-44A could be fitted with the PT-3 mine clearing device. It had a radio in the back of the turret with an antenna at the center of the left side of the turret. The vehicle was equipped with a submachine gun. The vehicle lacked an NBC (nuclear, biological and chemical) protection system and a night vision device.

== Production history ==
The T-44A officially entered service with the Red Army on 23 November 1944, the production having started in October. Production took place at the new Factory No. 75 (Zavod 75) in Kharkiv which used the buildings of the old KhPZ Factory No. 183 which were recaptured from Germans on 23 August 1943. To restore the factories to working order, engineers, workers, machines and tools were sent from Stalin Ural Tank Factory No. 183, located in Nizhny Tagil. The original plans were that the factory would produce 300 T-44As a month. However, only 25 were built by the end of 1944. In 1945, 940 were built, making a total of 965 (190 tanks built in 1944 and 1945 were completed by the end of the war). An additional 858 T-44As were made in 1946-1947. The T-34 continued to account for 85% of medium tank production through 1950, and development of a more advanced medium tank with a more powerful 100 mm gun proceeded. The relatively brief production run ended in 1947 with a total of 1,823 T-44A tanks built. The reasons for such a brief production run included mechanical teething problems, the end of the war which reduced the Red Army's need for a new tank, and the design's inability to successfully fit a 100 mm tank gun. It was replaced on the production lines by the T-54-1 main battle tank, which was more mechanically reliable and could mount a 100 mm gun. The superior T-54-2 would replace T-34 production at the Omsk Factory No. 183 in 1950, and the T-54/55 main battle tank series would remain in production until 1981.

== Service history ==
The T-44 was issued to three tank brigades mustered on 15 September 1944 for training purposes, but these formations (6th Guards, 33rd Guards, and 63rd Guards Tank Brigades) were re-equipped with T-34-85 tanks prior to entering the Battle of Berlin and Prague Offensive. The T-44A was not used operationally during World War II in Europe for several reasons, including the fact that the Red Army was not ready to accept a new tank; as lack of sufficient spares and technical specialists who could repair and maintain the new tanks; and the fact that many of the tank crews would have to be retrained. However, three tanks were sent to the 100th Special Tank Company, which tested them on the Eastern Front. Many T-44As were immediately sent, after production, to the Far East of the Soviet Union. The first tanks arrived there before the end of the war and were used operationally during the last three days of fighting. They continued to arrive after the war and eventually around 600 T-44As were stationed there.

Due to the Cold War, the USSR decided to keep the tank secret. It was never shown publicly during military parades and pictures were never shown publicly until the secrecy was dropped. There is almost no photographic evidence of T-44s stationed in East Germany or while being used briefly in Poland and Romania for training respective tank crews in 1952 nor during the Soviet invasion of Hungary in 1956, although it is factually known that T-44 tanks were sent to these various places (there are only a small number of known photographs of T-44A tanks in Hungary in existence).

In 1961, a number of T-44As were modernized with parts from the T-54 medium tank and other upgrades and received the designation T-44M. In 1963, some T-44Ms were converted into T-44MK command tanks. In 1965 some T-44Ms were converted into BTS-4A armoured recovery vehicles. In 1966, a number of T-44As and T-44Ms received the "Cyclone" gun stabilizer and the designations T-44S and T-44MS, respectively. According to most sources T-44S, T-44M and T-44MS tanks remained in service with the Soviet Army until the end of the 1970s, when their usefulness as tanks had ended. It is possible that they remained in storage until the beginning of the 1990s. Many T-44Ms were converted into artillery tractors, tank tractors and engineer tanks. A number of T-44A, T-44S, T-44M, T-44MK and T-44MS tanks were converted into fixed defensive positions; some of which are known to have been positioned on the border with the People's Republic of China. Unlike most Soviet-made weapons, the T-44 wasn't exported.

After the cloak of secrecy was lifted in the 1960s, when the tank was already becoming obsolete, it was used in the war movies Father of a Soldier, Liberation, Battle of Moscow, Red Cherry, The Star, and Downfall. In the first, it was used to portray a T-34. In Liberation, Red Cherry, The Star, and Downfall it was visually modified with additional plates to resemble the Tiger I heavy tank. Some T-44 and T-34 tanks were visually modified to represent German Panzerkampfwagen IVs. They were made for Soviet-era film studios and were used in a number of movies about battles on the Eastern Front. They were also used during a 2004 re-enactment of the Battle of Moscow.

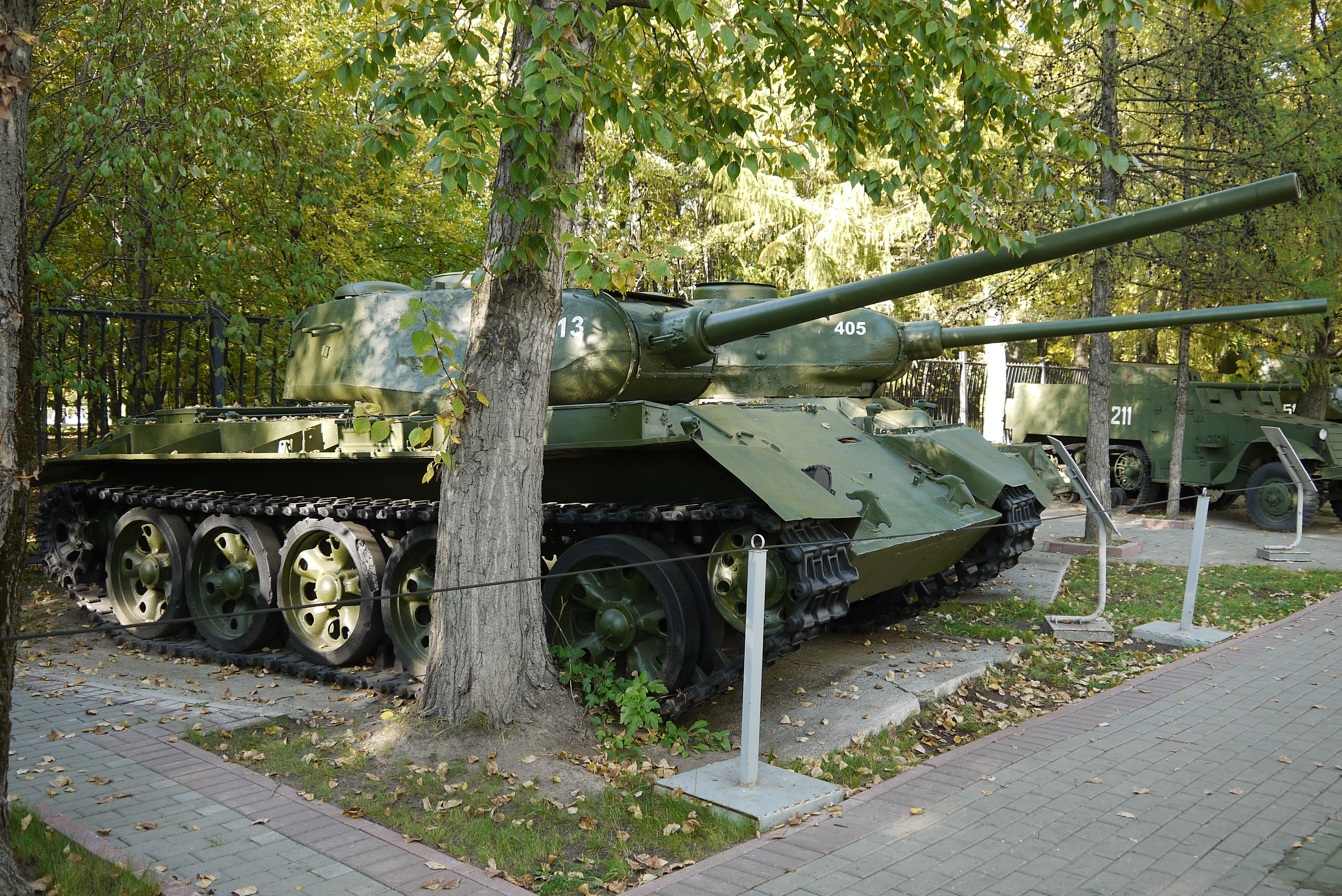
T-44 displayed in the Museum of the Great Patriotic War, Moscow, Poklonnaya Hill Victory Park.

Some T-44As were given to military museums including one in Brest in today's Belarus, and one in the Museum of the Great Patriotic War, Moscow, Poklonnaya Hill Victory Park. One of two T-44-100 prototypes are in the Kubinka Tank Museum near Moscow.

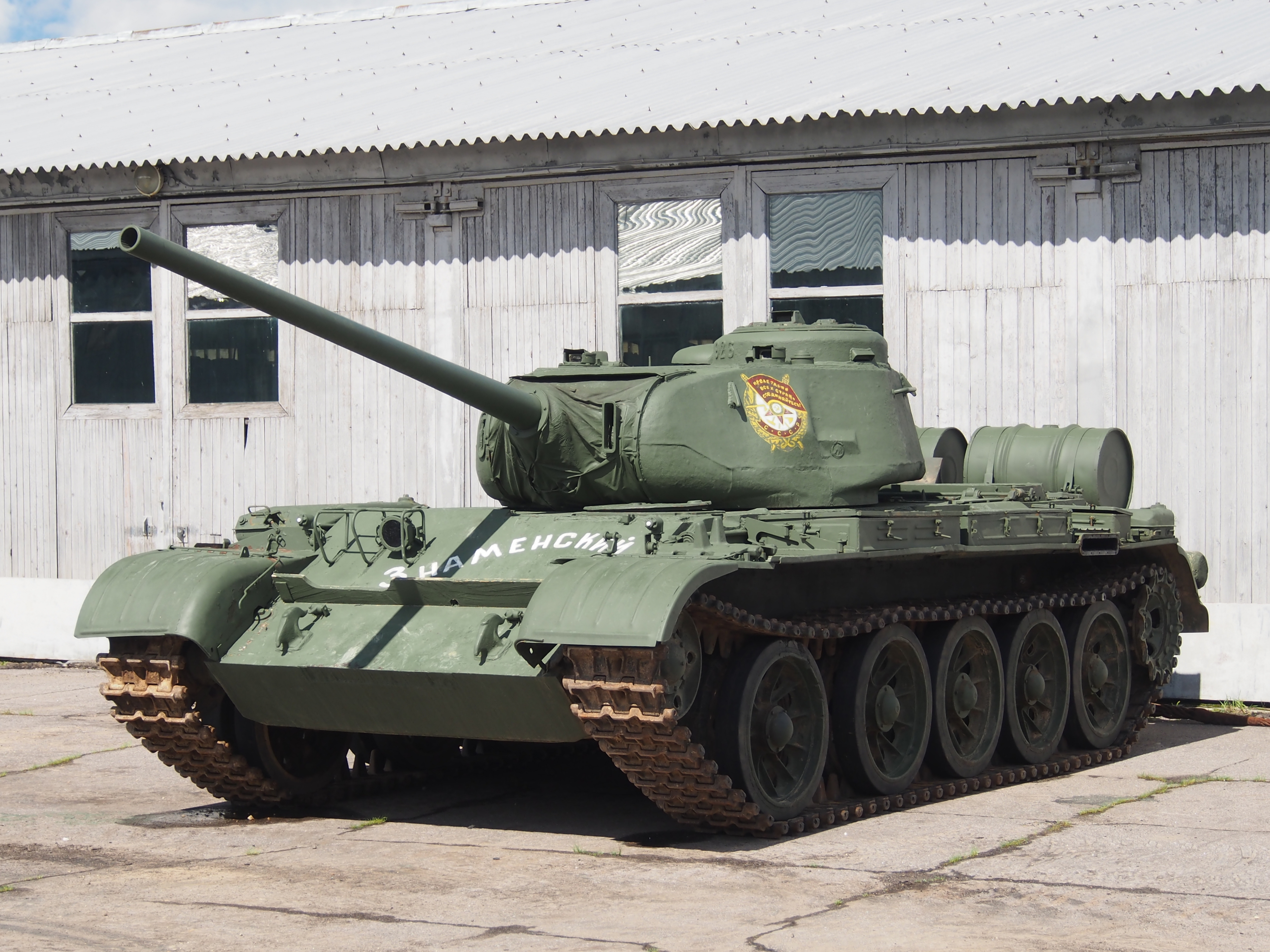
Restored T-44 "Znamenskiy" at the Kubinka Tank Museum.

In conjunction with the video game company Gaijin Entertainment, creators of the World War II multiplayer combat game War Thunder, and Kubinka Tank Museum, the T-44 tank number "221" was restored to full operating condition over the course of nearly six months, and given a parade paint scheme in the style of the T-44 "Znamenskiy" tank from the 29th Tank Corps of the 5th Guards Mechanized Army. This T-44 was one of the two T-44MS prototypes that had been stored outdoors at Kubinka for some time. The tank still carries its modified turret that was fitted with a two plane gun stabilizer.

== Variants ==
- T-44-85 (1944) – Designation for two first generation prototypes armed with 85 mm D-5T tank gun and two second generation prototypes armed with 85 mm ZiS-S-53 tank gun.
  - T-44A (1944) – Designation for the third generation prototype and the production model.
    - T-44S (1966) – T-44A fitted with "Cyclone" two-plane gun stabilization system.
    - T-44M (1961) – T-44A modernization incorporating a drive train upgraded to match the one used in T-54 including the V-54 12-cylinder 38.88 liter water-cooled diesel engine developing 523 hp (390 kW), gearbox, tracks, 'starfish' road wheels and a conventional toothed drive sprocket, flush with the outer track edge. It had an increased ammunition stowage (from 58 rounds to 61 rounds), new R-113 and R-120 radio sets, a heater and infra-red night sight, TVN-2 night vision device for the driver as well as another fuel tank which increased the fuel capacity by 150 liters to 650 liters and 800 liters with additional fuel tanks. The maximal road operational range of the tank increased to 420 km - 440 km. The original fenders were replaced with T-54-style ones. The catwalk stowage was changed to the flat T-54 rectangular external fuel tanks with embossed circle and cross. Hence the T-44M had a different arrangement of additional fuel tanks and stowage boxes. There were four rectangular external fuel tanks as well as two smaller ones on the right fender and fastenings for four spare track chain links, one rectangular external fuel tank as well as two smaller ones and one stowage box. The tank received a mount for an antiaircraft machine gun. A T-54-style headlight cluster with two headlights was added to right hand side of the glacis plate and the T-34-style headlight on the left hand side of the hull was removed.
      - T-44MK (1963) – T-44M converted into a command tank. Apart from standard T-44M equipment, it is equipped with R-112 radio set. The ammunition stowage was reduced by 15 rounds to 46 rounds.
      - T-44MS (1966) - T-44M fitted with "Cyclone" two-plane gun stabilization system. It also has increased maximal operational range.
      - BTS-4A (1965) – T-44M converted into an armoured recovery vehicle. The turret has been removed. The vehicle was fitted with a stowage basket, a hoist and a small folding crane with a capacity of 3 tonnes and a snorkel. It was also known as BTS-4-44M.
- T-44 tanks converted into fixed fortifications. This process usually involved the removal of the engine and the gearbox while burying the tank up to the top of the hull and covering the turret in concrete to break up the outline and to give it a rock-like appearance.
- T-44-122 (1944) – First generation prototype armed with D-25-44T 122 mm tank gun. It carried 24 rounds.
- T-44-100 (1945) – Prototype fitted with a new modified turret which would allow fitting the 100 mm D-10T gun or 100 mm LB-1 gun. The tank carries 36 rounds for the 100 mm tank gun. This prototype had the 12.7 mm DShK anti-aircraft heavy machine gun fitted to the loader's hatch, 6 mm thick sideskirts protecting the sides and two cylindrical fuel tanks in the back giving it a fuel capacity of 1035L. The longer tank gun barrel increased the overall length of the vehicle to 8.04 m. The new turret, new armament and the sideskirts made the vehicle heavier as it weighed 34.55 tonnes.
- SU-122-44 (1944) - Self-propelled gun prototype armed with a 122 mm gun.
- Uralmash-1 (1944) - Self-propelled gun prototype armed with either 100 mm gun or 122 mm gun. Also known as SU-101 and SU-102.

== Surviving vehicles ==
T-44

- Stalin Line Museum, Zaslawye, Belarus.
- Rahachow, Belarus.
- Caponier Club Collection, Moscow, Russia.
- Vadim Zadorozhny Museum, Arhangelskoe, Russia.
- UMMC Museum Complex, Verkhnyaya Pyshma, Russia.
- Mosfilm Military And Technical Cinema Depot, Russia. Four vismod T-44s
- Lemeshiv, Volyn Oblast, Ukraine. Turret only
- Glusk, Zhytomyr Oblast, Ukraine. Turret only
- Zviahel, Zhytomyr Oblast, Ukraine. Turret only
- Ovruch, Zhytomyr Oblast, Ukraine. T-44 turret on T-34 hull
- Unidentified fortification museum, Moscow. Turret only
- State Military Technical Museum, Ivanovo, Russia. Two turrets

T-44M

- Brest Fortress, Brest, Belarus.
- Kobryn, Brest Region, Belarus.
- Stalin Line Museum, Zaslawye, Belarus.
- Victory Park, Moscow, Russia.
- Kubinka Tank Museum, Kubinka, Russia. Two T-44Ms
- Museum of Russian Military History, Padikovo, Russia.
- Sokolova Gora, Saratov, Russia.
- Volsk, Saratov Oblast, Russia.
- Petrovsk, Saratov Oblast, Russia.

== Operators ==
=== Former operators ===
- Soviet Union
- Uzbekistan: Used for ceremonial roles.

== See also ==
- List of Soviet tanks
- M26 Pershing
- Panther tank
- Centurion Mk. 1

== General sources ==
- Zaloga, Steven J.; James Grandsen (1984). Soviet Tanks and Combat Vehicles of World War Two. London: Arms and Armour Press. ISBN 0-85368-606-8.
- Zaloga, Steven J.; Hugh Johnson (2004). T-54 and T-55 Main Battle Tanks 1944–2004. Botley, Oxford: Osprey Publishing. ISBN 1-84176-792-1.
