= ISU-122 =

Soviet self-propelled gun

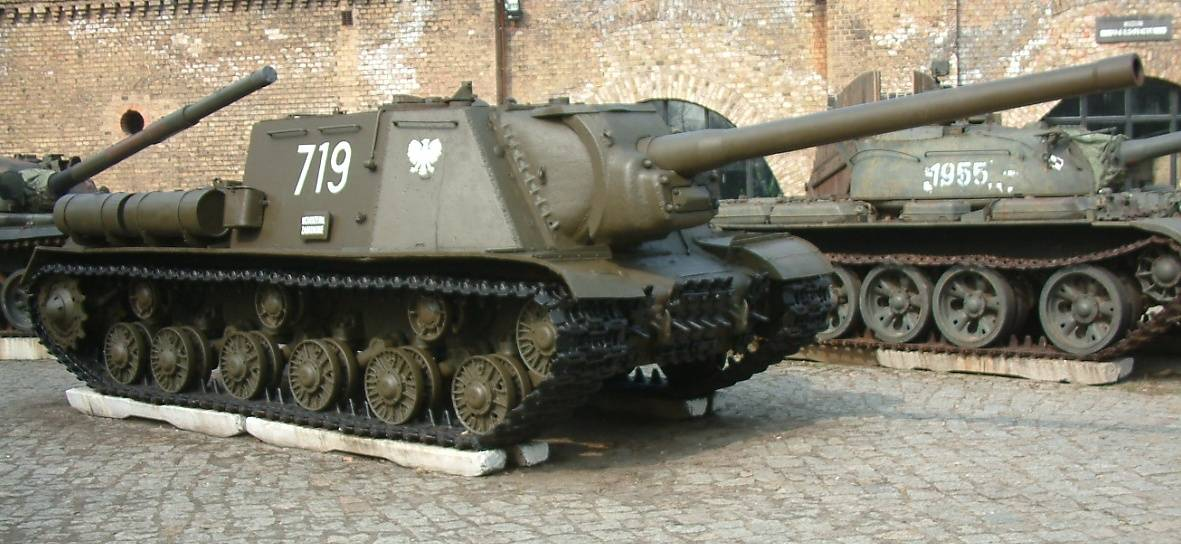
- A Polish ISU-122
- Type: Self-propelled gun
- Place of origin: Soviet Union

Production history
- No. built: 2,410 (all types)

Specifications
- Mass: 45.5 tonnes (50.2 short tons; 44.8 long tons)
- Length: 9.85 m (32 ft 4 in)
- Width: 3.07 m (10 ft 1 in)
- Height: 2.48 m (8 ft 2 in)
- Crew: 4 or 5
- Armor: Front 90 mm (3.5 in); Gun shield 120 mm (4.7 in); Side 90 mm (3.5 in)
- Main armament: A-19S 122 mm gun, with 30 rounds (ISU-122); D-25S 122 mm gun (ISU-122S)
- Secondary armament: 12.7 mm DShK AA machine gun, with 250 rounds
- Engine: 12-cyl. 4-stroke diesel model V-2IS; 520 hp (382 kW)
- Power/weight: 11 hp/tonne
- Suspension: torsion bar
- Operational range: Road: 220 km (140 mi); Cross-country: 80 km (50 mi)
- Maximum speed: 37 km/h (23 mph)

The ISU-122 (acronym of Istrebitelnaja - or Iosif Stalin-based - Samokhodnaya Ustanovka 122) was a Soviet assault gun used during World War II, mostly in the anti-tank role.

== History and purpose ==
A prototype of the ISU-122 (in Russian ИСУ-122) heavy self-propelled gun was built at the Chelyabinsk Kirov Plant (Chelyabinskiy Kirovskiy Zavod (ChKZ), Chelyabinsk, Russia), in December 1943. The design shared the chassis of the ISU-152 self-propelled gun and differed only in armament, having an A-19S 122-mm gun as its main weapon instead of the ISU-152's ML-20S gun-howitzer. Towed versions of these guns used the same carriage: 52-L-504A (Russian designation 52-Л-504А), so installation of an A-19 instead of an ML-20 gun was not a difficult task. After completing development of the ISU-152, ChKZ engineers mounted the A-19 gun on the ISU-152 chassis to create "Object 242" — the first ISU-122 prototype. It was successfully tested, but not immediately launched into mass production.

At that time, all ISU hulls were being equipped with the ML-20S gun-howitzer, but the production of hulls increased quickly and there was a lack of ML-20S tubes in the beginning of 1944. State authorities ordered these uncompleted hulls armed with an A-19 gun (specifically with the A-19S variant, slightly modified for the self-propelled gun mount). A further advantage of rearming the ISU was increased direct fire range against heavy German tanks. For these reasons, the State Defense Committee adopted Object 242 for Red Army service as the ISU-122 on 12 March 1944. In April 1944, the first series ISU-122 left the ChKZ production lines.

The A-19S gun had a manual-piston breech, which reduced the rate of fire from 2.5 to 1.5 shots per minute. Soviet designers developed the D-25 by modernizing the A-19S's breech, creating a semi-automatic variant of the 122-mm gun. The D-25 gun was installed in IS-2 tanks as a priority, but in September 1944 became available for self-propelled guns. The prototype ISU vehicle, armed with a D-25S was designated "Object 249" and successfully passed plant and state testing. The fire rate was improved to 2 to 3 shots per minute and with two strong experienced loaders the rate of fire reached 4 shots per minute. Due to the muzzle brake reducing recoil forces, the D-25 had a smaller recoil buffer than the A-19. This improved the crew's work conditions and allowed for a smaller, lighter gun shield with the same armour thickness.

After testing, Object 249 was immediately launched in mass production as the ISU-122S (ИСУ-122С) self-propelled gun. However, the original ISU-122 remained in production (along with the ISU-152) due to a large stock of A-19 guns (the ML-20 and D-25 came directly from artillery factories). Mass production of the ISU-122 and ISU-122S ceased at the end of 1945. ChKZ produced 1,735 ISU-122 and 675 ISU-122S variants in total.

After World War II, many surviving ISU-122s were rebuilt as very large calibre gun chassis or supply vehicles. The small number of ISU-122s that kept their original armament were modernized in 1958. This modernization was not as complete as that of the ISU-152. Most ISU-122s did not receive a new engine, only upgraded gun sights and radio sets. In the beginning of 1960, the ISU-122 was withdrawn from Soviet Army service (the ISU-152 served much longer). Some disarmed ISU-122s were transferred to civil organizations, to be used as emergency vehicles on Soviet railways or as tracked transport in Arctic areas of the Soviet Union. However, most ISU-122s (both variants) remained in service longer in Warsaw Pact states and, with unconfirmed reports, in service in North Korea and China, having both variants.

== Variants ==
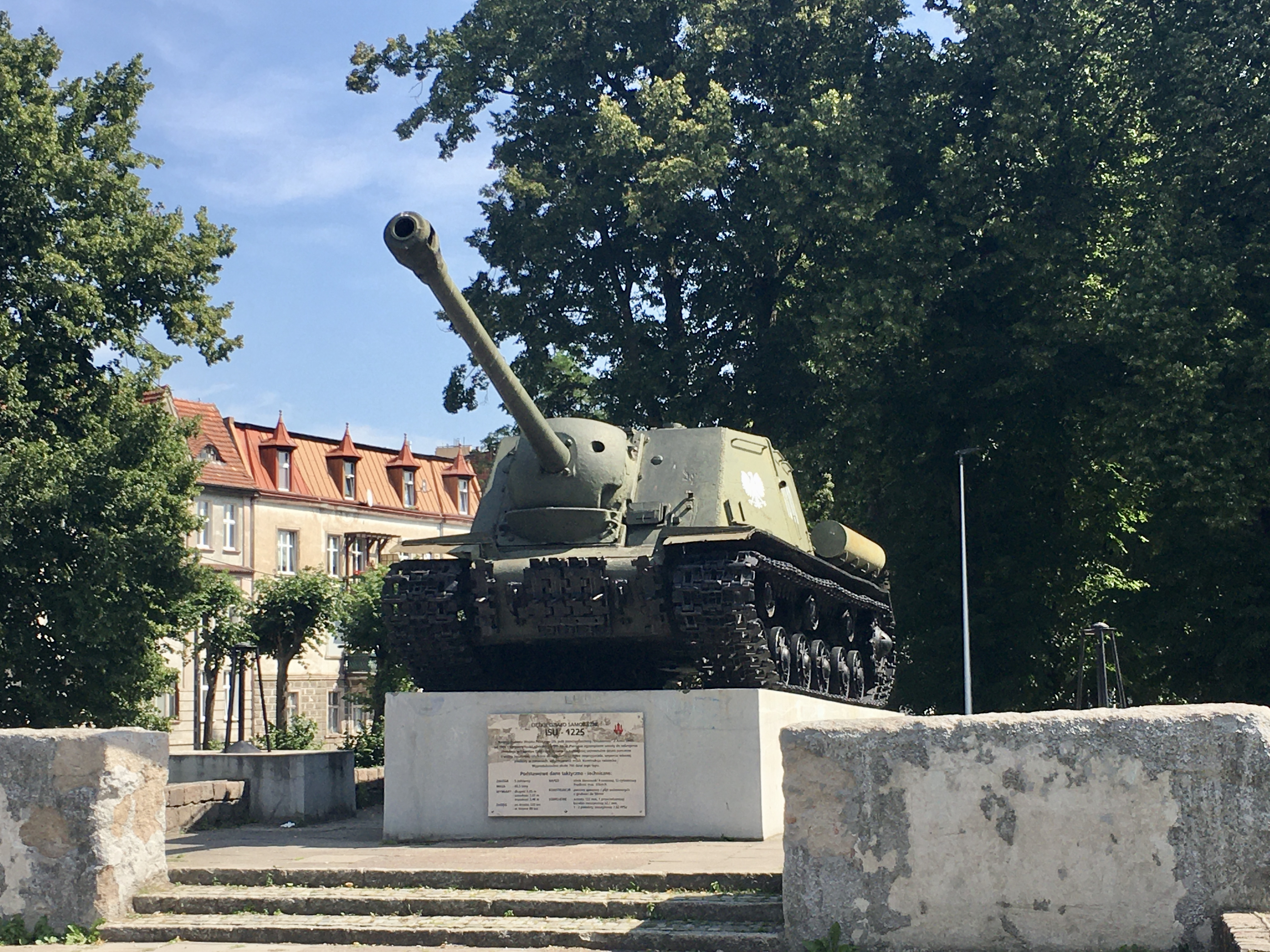
ISU-122S in Malbork, Poland

Some vehicles were fitted with a 12.7 mm DShK anti-aircraft machine gun.

- ISU-122S - In later models, the A-19 gun was modified to have a semi-automatic breech block. This gun was designated D-25S, and the vehicle mounting it ISU-122S. The modification increased rate of fire from 1.5 rounds/minute to 3 rounds/minute. The ISU-122S variant is recognizable by its ball-shaped gun mantlet and double-baffle muzzle brake. The ISU-122S model was coded 'type 249' by the German's in their reporting.

== Construction and design ==
Construction of the ISU-122 and ISU-152 is the same except for the gun mounting, sights and ammunition stowage. The A-19S or D-25S cannons of the ISU-122 had 18 degrees elevation angle and 30 rounds of ammunition (the ISU-152 had 20 degrees and 20 rounds respectively). The A-19S cannon was equipped with an ST-18 (СТ-18) telescopic sight and the D-25S cannon was equipped with a TSh-17 (ТШ-17) sight. Both types of sights had maximal exact targeting distance of 1.5 km (the ISU-152 could manage only 900 m). Maximum direct fire range of the A-19S or D-25S cannons was 5 km, much further than these sights' targeting abilities. For direct or indirect firing on distances over 1.5 km the gunner used the second, panoramic sight.

The ISU-122 had a five-man crew; their location and roles were identical to those of ISU-152 crewmen. The ISU-122S was used with either four- or five-man crews since the semi-automatic breech allowed for a reasonable fire rate with a crew of four; the place of the absent loader was often taken up with additional ammunition. With a five-man crew (two loaders), the ISU-122S demonstrated a better fire rate than with four men.

== Organization ==
The organization of military units utilizing the ISU-122 was the same as with the ISU-152. Soviet Army commanders tried not to mix the ISU-122 and the ISU-152 in one regiment or brigade, although there were some units equipped with both types. The different armament of the ISU-122 and the ISU-152 caused problems with ammunition supplies and logistics. Another disadvantage of mixed-type units was a doubling of the calculations required for massed indirect fire.

== Combat history ==
The ISU-122 was used as a powerful assault gun, a self-propelled howitzer, and a long-range tank destroyer, the same as with the SU-152 and ISU-152 heavy self-propelled guns in general. However, these vehicles differed in their combat use. The primary application of the ISU-122 was as a tank destroyer, while the SU/ISU-152 tended more towards the assault gun role. With the same hull as the IS-2, the ISU-122 had good armour performance but very good performance with high-explosive rounds. The 122-mm gun had great potential, although the gun's abilities were somewhat reduced by the available projectiles. In 1944, the BR-471 was the sole armour-piercing round available. An improved version, the BR-471B (БР-471Б), was developed in early 1945, but was available in quantity only after World War II ended. In extremis, the ISU-122 engaged enemy heavy armour with OF-471 (ОФ-471) high explosive projectiles. These shells had a mass of 25 kg, a muzzle velocity of 800 m/s, and were equipped with a 3 kg TNT charge. Mechanical shock and explosion was often enough to knock out enemy AFVs without any armour penetration.

For urban combat, ISU-122s were utilized as assault guns, but with a lower efficiency in comparison to the SU/ISU-152. In general, Red Army commanders viewed the ISU-122 as a good assault gun. The OF-471 projectile was powerful enough against unprotected and entrenched infantry, pillboxes, and fortified buildings. In urban combat, the long barrel of the 122 mm cannon sometimes made maneuvering difficult.

Use of the ISU-122 as a self-propelled howitzer was rare, although its maximum range of fire exceeded 14 km. Usually, the ISU-122 delivered indirect fire to the enemy during rapid advances when support from towed artillery was not available.

== Surviving examples ==
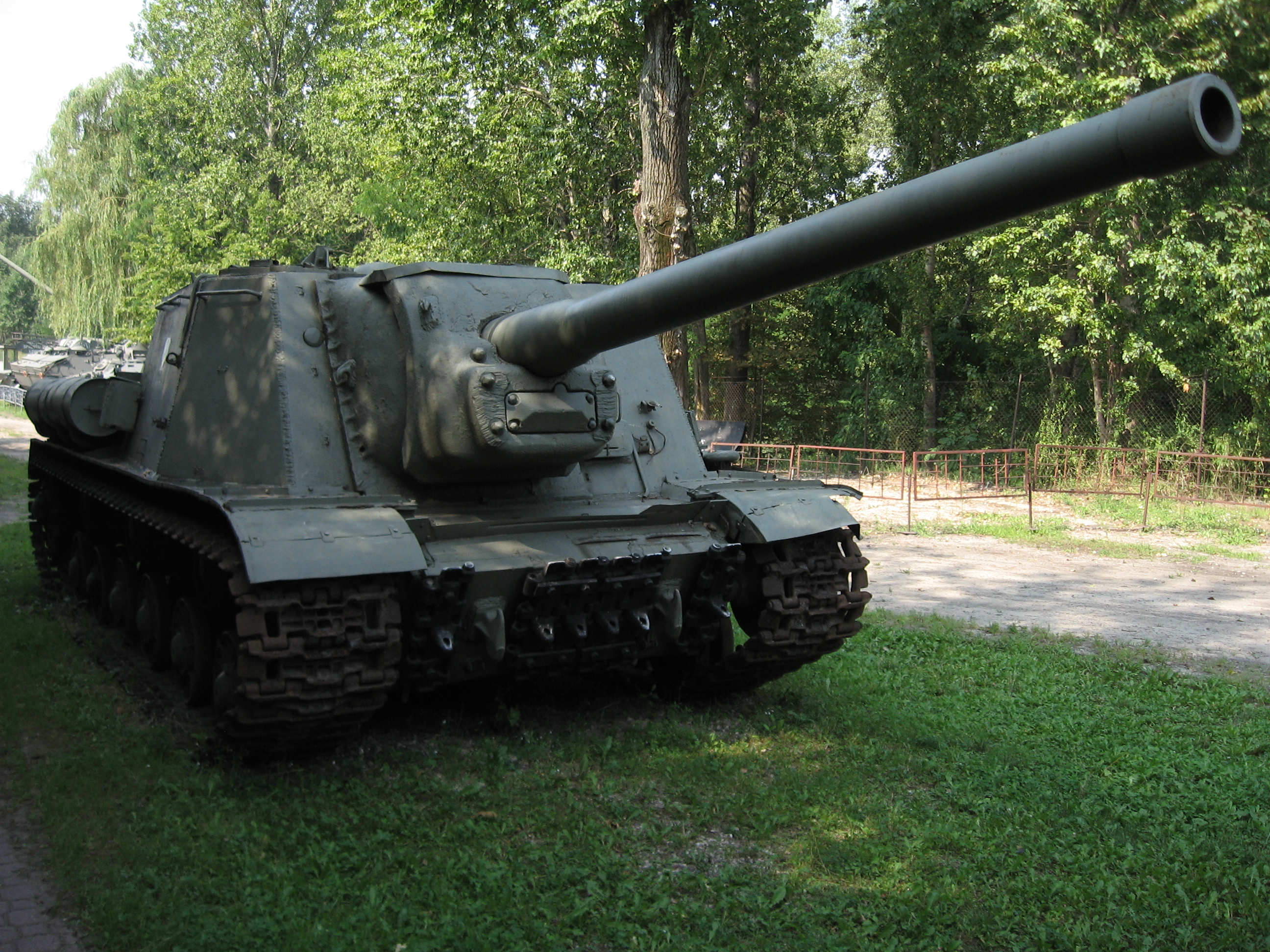
ISU-122 at the Museum of Polish Military Technology in Warsaw

Most of the ISU-122s produced survived the Second World War and examples remain, but only a few of the surviving ISU-122s kept their initial appearance. Many were rebuilt or scrapped in the mid 1960s. The number of ISU-122s preserved in museums and memorials is substantially lower than surviving ISU-152s. ISU 122s can be seen in the Military Historical Museum of Artillery, Engineers and Signal Corps in St Petersburg, the Kubinka Tank Museum, the Central Museum of the Russian Army, the National Museum of the History of Ukraine in the Second World War in Kyiv (where it is an ISU-152 crudely modified with spare D-25T gun, labeled as ISU-122S) and other tank museums and World War II memorials in Poland and Belarus.

== Operators ==
- China
- North Korea
- Polish People's Republic
- Soviet Union

== See also ==
- List of Soviet tanks - covers all periods

=== Tanks of comparable role, performance and era ===
- Ho-Ri Japanese proposed tank destroyer, only mock-up scale model were built
- Elefant German tank destroyer, entered service in 1943
- Sturer Emil German tank destroyer, entered service in 1942

== Sources ==
- Solyankin A. G., Pavlov M. V., Pavlov I. V., Zheltov I. G. — Soviet heavy self-propelled guns 1941—1945, Moscow, Printing centre «Exprint», 2005, 48 pp. ISBN 5-94038-080-8 (Солянкин А. Г., Павлов М. В., Павлов И. В., Желтов И. Г. Советские тяжёлые самоходные артиллерийские установки 1941-1945 гг., М. ООО Издательский центр «Экспринт», 2005, 48 с. ISBN 5-94038-080-8)
- Kajetanowicz, Jerzy (2005). Polskie wojska lądowe 1945-1960: skład bojowy, struktury organizacyjne i uzbrojenie. Toruń; Łysomice: Europejskie Centrum Edukacyjne. ISBN 83-88089-67-6.
