= T48 Gun Motor Carriage =

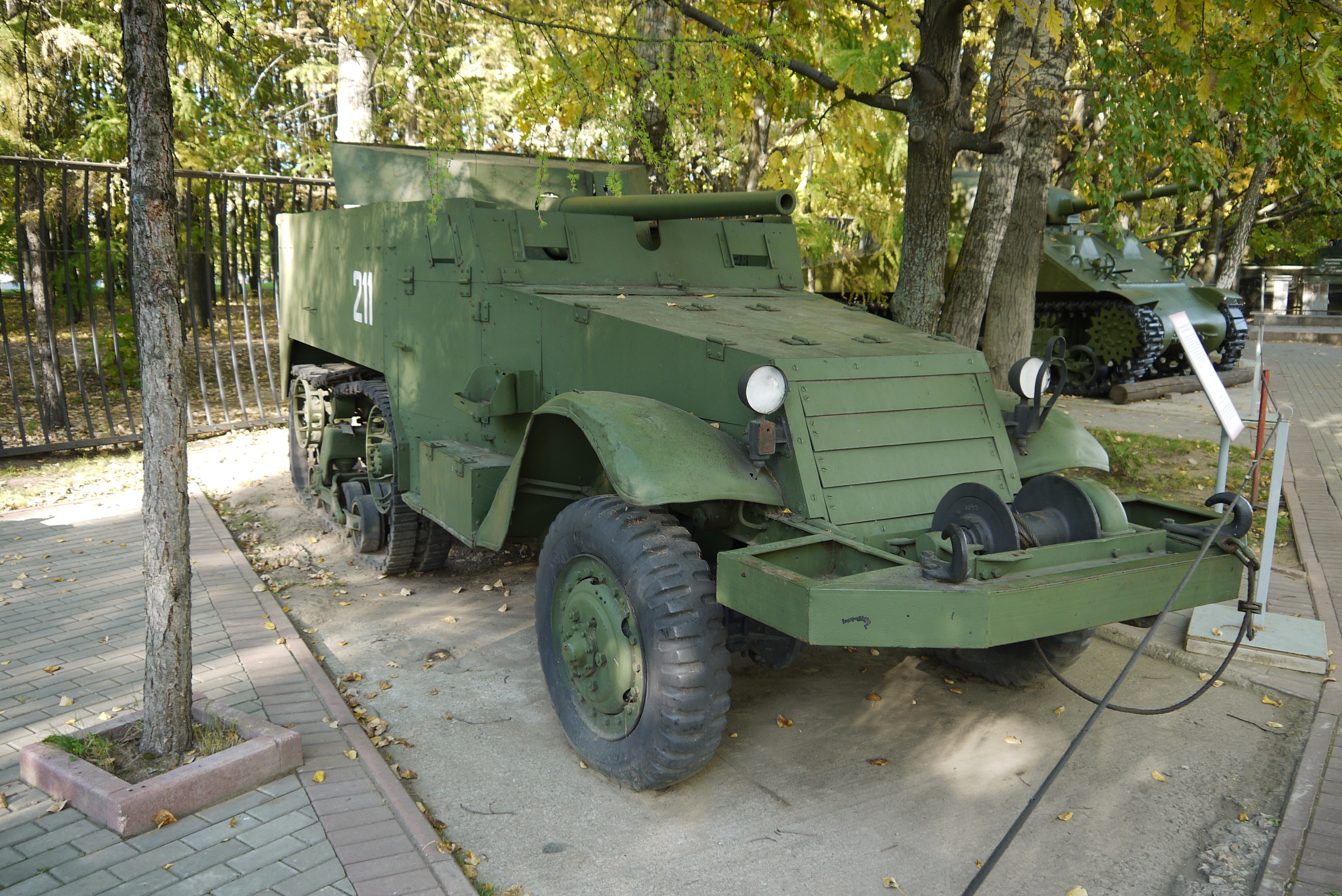
- A T48 GMC in Moscow on Poklonnaya Hill.
- Type: Self-propelled anti-tank gun
- Place of origin: United States

Service history
- In service: 1943–1945
- Used by: See § Operators
- Wars: World War II

Production history
- Designer: Aberdeen Proving Grounds
- Designed: 1940–1941
- Manufacturer: Diamond T Motor Car Co.
- Developed from: Chassis: M3 Half-track; Gun: 57 mm gun M1
- Produced: 1942–1943
- No. built: 962 (281 converted to M3A1 Half-track)

Specifications
- Mass: 9.45 t (20,800 lb)
- Length: 21 ft 0 in (6.40 m)
- Width: 7 ft 1 in (2.16 m)
- Height: 7 ft 0 in (2.13 m)
- Crew: 5 men: Gun Commander (Rear); Gunner (Rear); Loader (Rear); Driver (Cab right); Assistant driver (Cab left)
- Armor: hull:6 mm windscreen visor and gun shield: 12.7 mm
- Main armament: 57 mm gun M1 with 99 rounds
- Engine: White 160AX, 386 in^{3} (6,330 cc), six cylinder, gasoline, compression ratio 6.3:1, 128 hp (95 kW)
- Power/weight: 15.8 hp/ton
- Suspension: Half-track, vertical volute springs
- Fuel capacity: 60 US gal (230 L)
- Operational range: 150 mi (240 km)
- Maximum speed: 45 mph (72 km/h)

The T48 57 mm gun motor carriage was a self-propelled anti-tank gun produced by the Diamond T company in 1943 for the United States. The design incorporated a 57 mm gun M1, a US production of the British Ordnance QF 6 pounder, mounted on an M3 half-track.

A total of 962 vehicles were produced from 1942 to 1943. It had originally been planned that Britain would receive all of the examples produced through Lend-Lease, intending to use them in the Western Desert, but by the time they arrived the campaign was over. Additionally, the purpose-built M10 tank destroyer, armed with a 3-inch gun (and later a 17-pounder gun in British service) had begun to enter production. As a result, the British transferred 650 half-tracks to the Soviet Union under the Soviet Aid Program. Britain retained 30 and the remainder were taken by the US; except for one kept by the U.S. Army, these British and American vehicles were converted back to standard M3 half-tracks.

The Soviets called it the SU-57 (Samokhodnaya ustanovka 57); under this designation it served in Operation Bagration and other fighting on the Eastern Front during World War II.

== Specifications ==
The T48 gun motor carriage was 21 ft (6.4 m) long, 7 ft 1 in (2.16 m) wide, and 7 ft (2.1 m) high. It had a wheelbase of 135.5 in (3.44 m), and weighed 9.45 tons (20,800 lb). The suspension consisted of a leaf spring for the wheels, while the front tread had vertical volute springs. The vehicle had a maximum speed of 45 mph (72 km/h). With a fuel capacity of 60 US gallons (230 L), it had a range of 150 miles (240 km), and was powered by a 128 hp (95 kW) White 160AX, 386 in^{3} (6,330 cc), 6-cylinder gasoline engine with a compression ratio of 6:3:1. The power-to-weight ratio was 15.8 hp/ton. It also had 6–12 mm of armor, and was armed with a single 57 mm Gun M1 with 99 rounds of ammunition. It had a crew of five (commander, gunner, driver, loader, and radio operator).

== Development ==
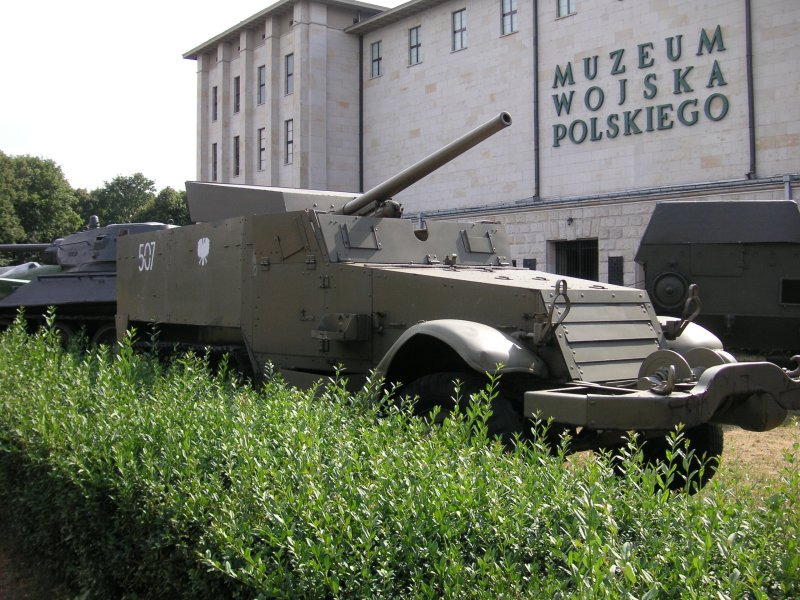
T48 in the Polish Army Museum

The T48 originated from an Anglo-American requirement for a self-propelled 6-pounder anti-tank gun. (Note: The 57 mm 6-pounder gun was the latest British anti-tank gun at the time the T48 was designed.) The requirement was met by emplacing a 57 mm gun M1 – the U.S. production version of the British Ordnance QF 6-pounder – in the rear of an M3 half-track. The first production batch was ordered in April 1942. The Americans dropped their requirements because of the design of another tank destroyer, the M10. Afterwards, it was intended solely to be supplied overseas under the terms of the Lend-Lease Program; the T48 was never officially type-classified.

=== Pilot model ===
The pilot model was built at the Aberdeen Proving Ground in May 1942. The 57 mm Gun M1 was mounted in the M12 recoil mechanism and installed on a tubular pedestal. The tubular pedestal was soon replaced with a conical structure that was designated the "57 mm gun mount T5". The gun on the pilot model had a traverse of 27.5 degrees either side of the centerline (total of 55 degrees), while having an elevation of +15 to -5 degrees. The short-barrelled (43 caliber) British Mark III 6-pounder gun was installed in the pilot, but the longer-barrelled (50 caliber) 57 mm Gun M1 was specified for the production models. The original travel lock – to hold the gun in a fixed position when the vehicle was moving – proved to be unsatisfactory, and was replaced by a travel lock on the front hood.

The original design used a gun shield taken from the T44 57 mm gun motor carriage, but after the first tests were complete, a new shield was designed with face-hardened steel 5/8 inch thick on the front and 1/4 inch thick on the sides and top. The shield extended over the crew with a relatively low silhouette of only 90 in (2.3 m). Experience with the M3 gun motor carriage in the Philippines Campaign, resulted in demountable headlights being used. (Note: During the Philippines Campaign it was found that the M3's headlights were damaged when its gun was fired. The deformation to the hood from the same cause also resulted in damage to the M3's engine and the transmission.) The T48 was accepted for production in 1942.

== Service history ==
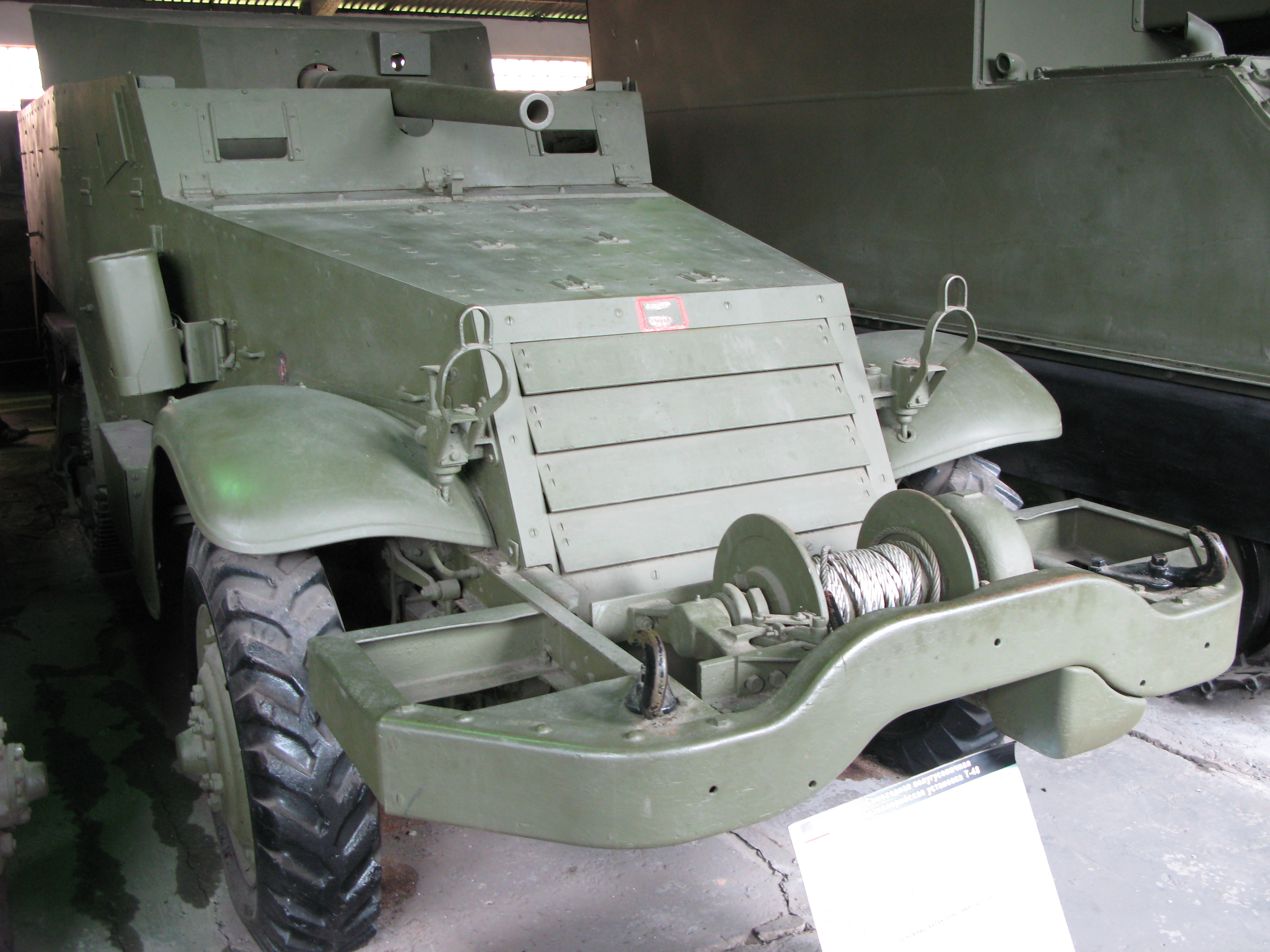
A T48 in the Kubinka tank museum.

Deliveries of the T48 were made in 1942 and 1943, with 50 arriving in 1942 followed by a further 912 in 1943. The British ordered all of the T48s that were produced, intending to use them in the Western Desert Campaign. By the time the vehicles arrived in the theater in the summer of 1943, the British had already won the war in the Western Desert. Meanwhile, the 57 mm gun was superseded by the 75 mm gun from the U.S., and later the availability of the Ordnance QF 17-pounder gun, meant that the T48 became surplus to British requirements. As a result, the vehicles were almost immediately shipped to the Soviet Union under the terms of the Soviet Aid Program. Through this, the Soviets received 650 vehicles, which they designated the "SU-57" (Samokhodnaya ustanovka 57). A small number were later passed to the Polish People's Army.

Of the remainder, Britain accepted 30, all of which were converted back into carriers, and the US took 282 vehicles. Of those retained by the US, all but one were converted back to M3A1 standard carriers in 1944. The conversion took place at the Chester Tank Depot. The Wehrmacht also operated a number of T48s as carriers, having captured several from Britain and the Soviet Union.

The Soviets employed the T48 along the Eastern Front, mainly in Operation Bagration. The Soviet 16th Separate Tank Destroyer Brigade used a large number of T48s in 1943 during the offensive across the Dnieper River, and with the 19th Brigade during the Baranow bridgehead battle in August 1944. The T48 also served with the Soviet 22nd Self-Propelled Artillery Brigade. Some of these units also took part in the Berlin and Prague offensives. The Polish People's Army used T48s assigned to the 7th Self-Propelled Artillery Battery to support Soviet attacks into Germany and Poland.

In Soviet service, the vehicles were allocated to brigades at a scale of 60 per brigade. During the attack, the vehicles were used to provide mobile fire support, being placed behind the infantry, usually in a hull-down position behind a ridge or a hill, to fire across a broad front to take advantage of the long range of the 57 mm gun.

== Operators ==
Nazi Germany

- Wehrmacht units operated a small number of T48s captured from UK and the Soviet Union.

Poland

- Polish Army in the East received 15 vehicles operated previously by the Red Army.

Soviet Union

- Red Army operated T48 GMC under the designation SU-57.

United Kingdom

- British Army accepted 30 vehicles, later rebuilt as carriers.

United States

- U.S. Army used T48s rebuilt as M3A1 half-tracks, in 1944. Most rebuilt by the Chester Tank Depot. One T48 was integrated into the U.S. Army.

== See also ==
- Deacon (artillery) – a British 6-pdr gun on an armored truck
- List of U.S. military vehicles by supply catalog designation
