= 122 mm gun M1931/37 (A-19) =

Soviet field gun

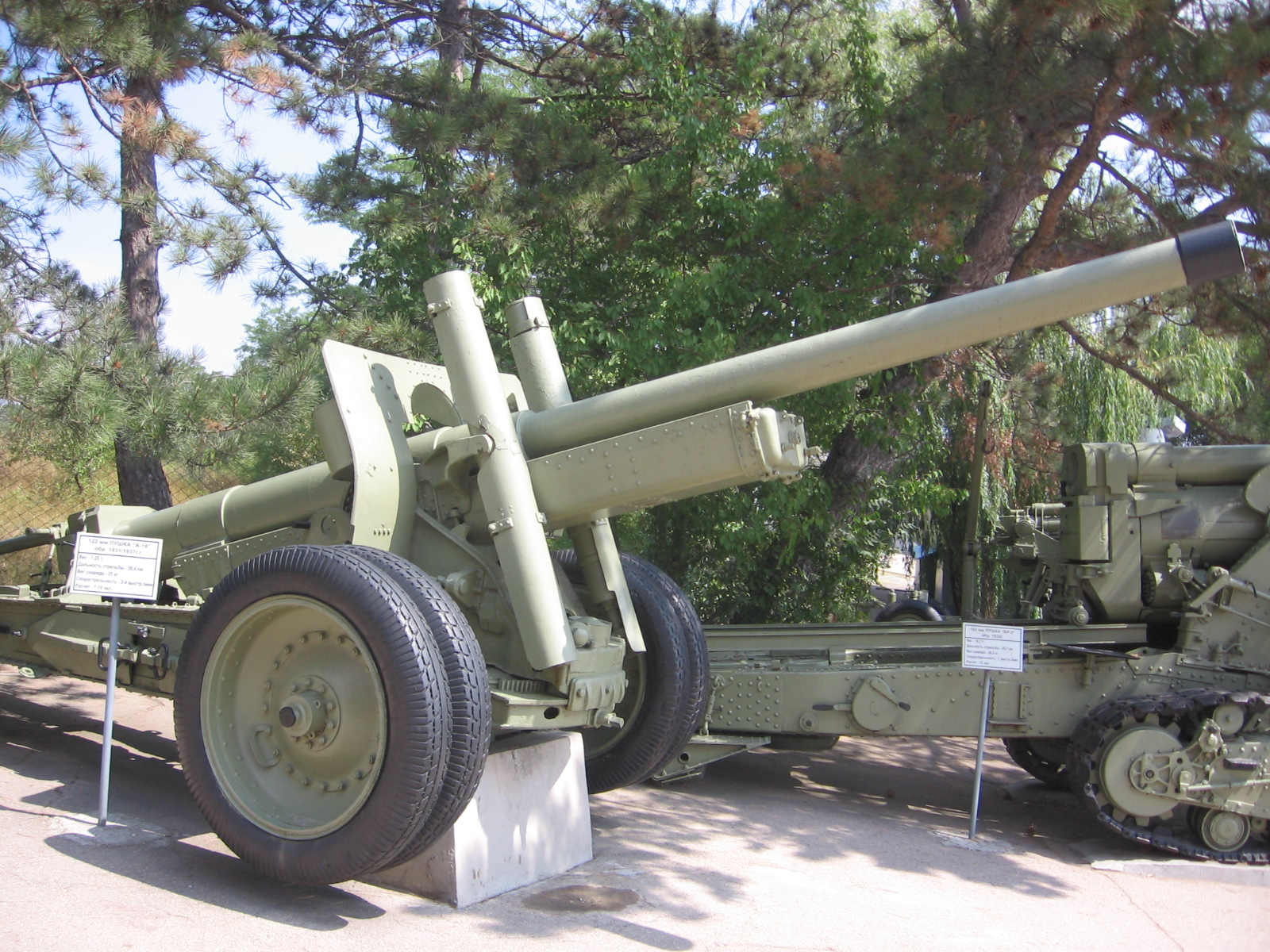
- M1931/37 at the Museum on Sapun Mountain, Sevastopol
- Type: Field gun Tank gun
- Place of origin: USSR

Production history
- Designer: No. 172 Plant design bureau, led by F. F. Petrov
- Designed: 1931–1938
- Manufacturer: Barrikady Plant, No. 172 Plant
- Produced: 1939–1946
- No. built: about 2,450

Specifications
- Mass: Combat: 7,117 kg (15,690 lbs); Travel: 7,907 kg (17,431 lbs)
- Length: 8.725 m (28 ft 8 in)
- Barrel length: Bore: 5.485 m (17 ft 11.9 in) L/45; Overall:5.65 m (18 ft 6 in) L/46.3
- Width: 2.345 m (7 ft 8 in)
- Height: 2.27 m (7 ft 5 in)
- Crew: 9
- Shell: 122 × 785 mm. R
- Caliber: 122 mm (4.8 in)
- Breech: interrupted screw
- Recoil: hydro-pneumatic
- Carriage: split trail
- Elevation: −2° to 65°
- Traverse: 58°
- Rate of fire: 3–4 rounds per minute
- Muzzle velocity: 806 m/s (2,640 ft/s)
- Maximum firing range: 20.4 km (12.67 mi)

122 mm corps gun M1931/37 (A-19) (Russian: 122-мм корпусная пушка обр. 1931/1937 гг. (А-19)) was a Soviet field gun developed in late 1930s by combining the barrel of the 122 mm gun M1931 (A-19) and the carriage of the 152 mm howitzer-gun M1937 (ML-20). The gun was in production from 1939 until 1946. It saw action in World War II (primarily with corps and RVGK artillery of the Red Army) and remained in service for a long time after the end of the war. Vehicle-mounted variants of the gun were fitted to the IS-2 and IS-3 tanks of the Iosif Stalin series of tanks and the ISU-122 self-propelled gun.

== Development history ==
In 1936 the Red Army adopted the 122 mm gun M1931, also known as A-19. Unlike earlier ordnance pieces used by the Red Army, it had split trail carriage with suspension, and consequently improved mobility and traverse. The carriage of M1931 had a number of shortcomings though. The elevation mechanism was slow and unreliable; solid-tired wheels hindered mobility to some extent; there were technological problems in carriage production.

Soon after the M1931, the Red Army received another artillery piece in form of the 152 mm howitzer-gun M1937 (ML-20), developed at the No. 172 Plant, under F. F. Petrov. This led to an upgrade of the M1931, handled also by Petrov's design bureau. The barrel of the M1931 was placed on the carriage of a ML-20. The improved gun successfully underwent trials in September–October 1938 and on 29 April 1939 was adopted as 122 mm corps gun M1931/37. Unusually, the new variant, like the old one, was referred to as A-19.

== Production history ==
The M1931/37 was manufactured by the Barrikady Plant in Stalingrad (1939–41), No. 172 Plant (1941–46). The number of M1931/37s manufactured can be estimated at 2,450, not including those mounted on vehicles.

Production of M1931/37s, pcs.
Year	1939	1940	1941	1942	1943	1944	1945	1946
Produced, pcs.	256 (including M1931)	469	442	385	414	160	245	206

== Description ==
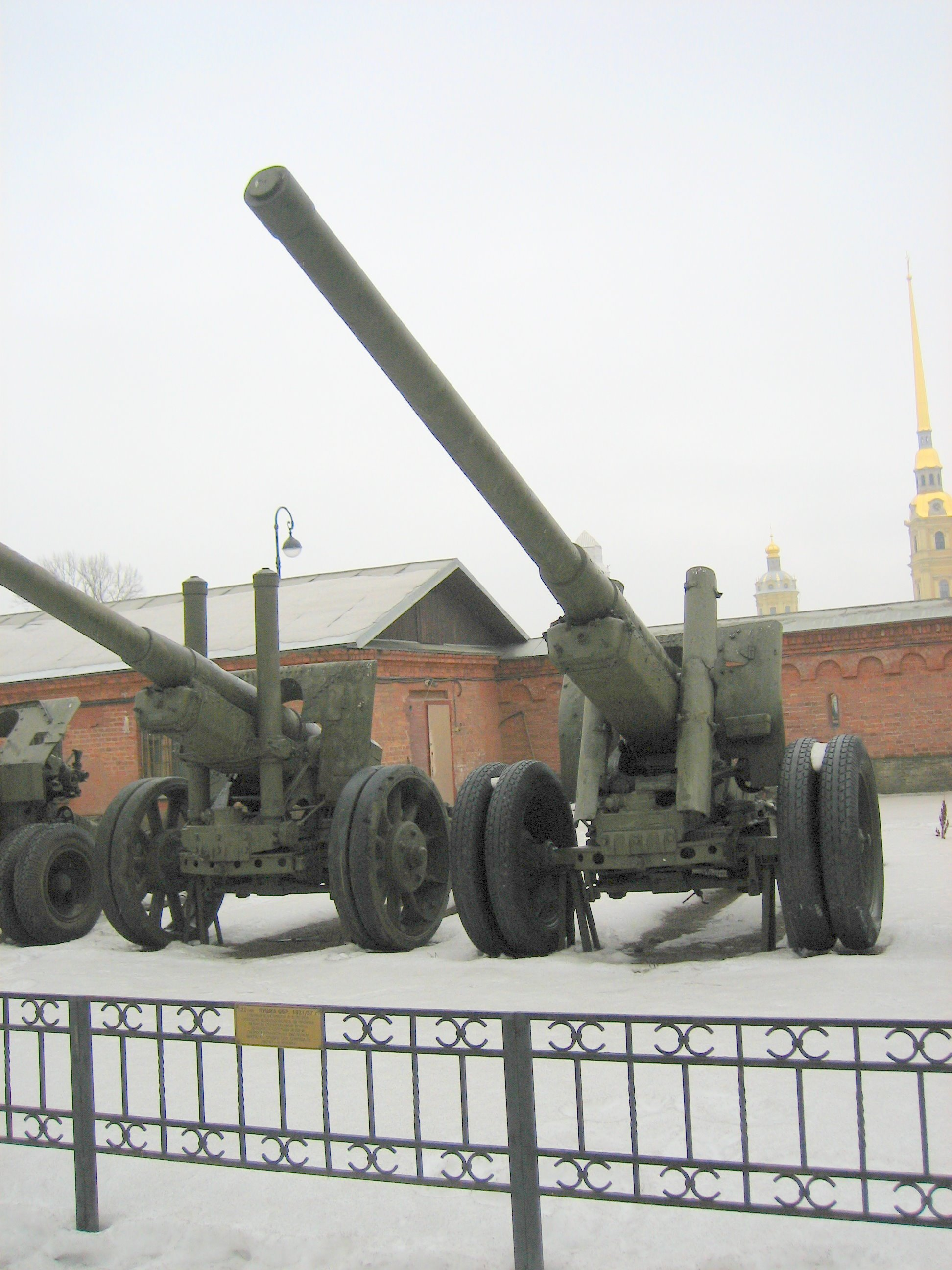
The M1931/37 (right) stands beside what appears to be its predecessor, the M1931, in the Artillery Museum in Saint Petersburg.

Like barrel of late production M1931, the barrel of the M1931/37 was of loose liner construction, and consisted of liner, jacket and screwed-upon breech. The breechblock was of interrupted screw type, similar in construction to that of the 152 mm howitzer M1910/37. Recoil system consisted of hydraulic recoil buffer and hydro-pneumatic recuperator, both located inside the cradle under the barrel.

The gun had split trail carriage adapted from the 152 mm howitzer-gun M1937 (ML-20). The carriage was fitted with leaf spring suspension and metal wheels with pneumatic tires. The carriage also featured an equilibrator. The shield gave the crew some protection from small arms and shell fragments.

The M1931/37 was transported as a single piece, with barrel pulled back. It was permitted to tow the gun with barrel in its normal position, but for short distances only and with speed of no more than 4–5 km/h. Several types of artillery tractors were used: S-2 Stalinets-2, Komintern and, from 1943, Ya-12.

== Organization and employment ==
Both variants, M1931 and M1931/37, had the same place in army organizations, were often used alongside each other and combat reports rarely differentiate between them; consequently, the data in this section is for M1931 and M1931/37 together, unless specified otherwise.

=== Red Army ===
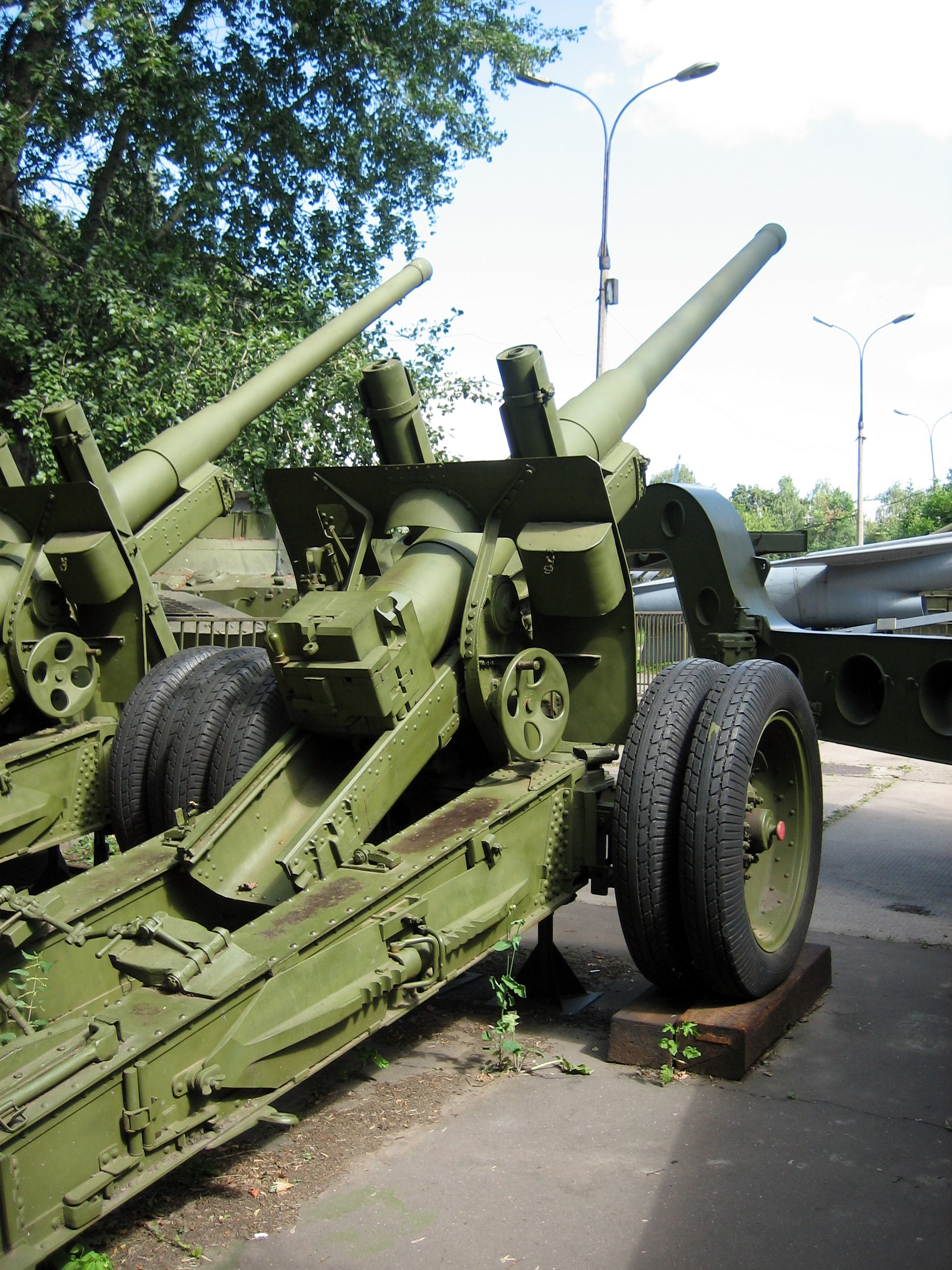
The M1931/37 in the Central Armed Forces Museum, Moscow

The A-19 was originally intended for corps artillery. Together with ML-20 it formed a so-called "corps duplex". In 1940–41 there were three types of corps artillery regiments:

- With two battalions of ML-20 and one of either A-19 or 107-mm guns (a total of 24 ML-20s).
- With two battalions of ML-20 and two of either A-19 or 107-mm guns (a total of 24 ML-20s).
- With three battalions of ML-20 (a total of 36 ML-20s).

Soon after the outbreak of the Great Patriotic War the corps artillery was eliminated (as rifle corps themselves were eliminated) and was only reintroduced late in the war. Those new artillery regiments were issued 122 mm guns along with other pieces, mainly 107 mm guns and 152 mm howitzers, in total 16–20 pieces per regiment. On 1 June 1944, RKKA corps artillery possessed 387 A-19s (along with some 750 107 mm and 152 mm pieces), and on 1 May 1945—289 A-19s (again along with some 750 100 mm, 107 mm and 152 mm pieces).

The gun was also used by artillery units of the Reserve of the Main Command (RVGK). In mid-1941 a cannon regiment of the RVGK had 48 A-19; in autumn 1941 these regiments were reorganized, a new, smaller, regiment had 18 A-19s. From 1942 cannon brigades were introduced, with 36 A-19s each. Such brigade could be a part of an artillery division—a huge formation, with up to four brigades of A-19 or ML-20 (meaning up to 144 pieces).

The first combat use of the A-19 was in the Battle of Khalkhin Gol. It also saw combat in the Winter War. On 1 March 1940 there were 130 A-19 guns at the frontline. Three pieces were lost.

By June 1941 the RKKA possessed, according to different sources, 1257 (1236 in the Army and 21 in the Navy) or 1300 A-19s. The gun proceeded to be used throughout the Great Patriotic War.

The A-19 was primarily used for indirect fire against enemy personnel, fortifications and key objects in the near rear. It was also equipped with armour-piercing shells for direct fire against armoured targets. Although not an ideal anti-tank gun because of its large size, slow traverse and relatively slow rate of fire, in 1943 the A-19 was one of only a few Soviet guns effective against the new German tanks, such as the Tiger and Elefant. The tank gun variant, the D-25 was even able to penetrate the upper frontal plate of the Tiger II at a range of 500-600 metres although it did require multiple rounds to be fired to do so.

An A-19 No. 501 was the first gun to open fire on 20 April 1945 at the Battle of Berlin.

=== Other operators ===
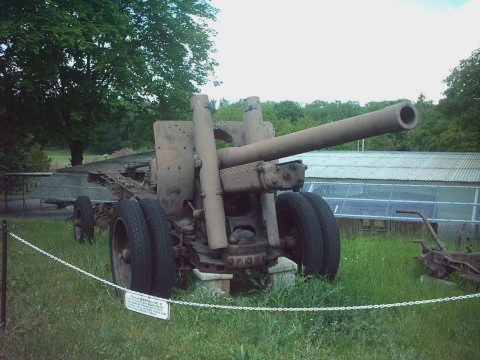
The M1931/37 in Poznań Citadel

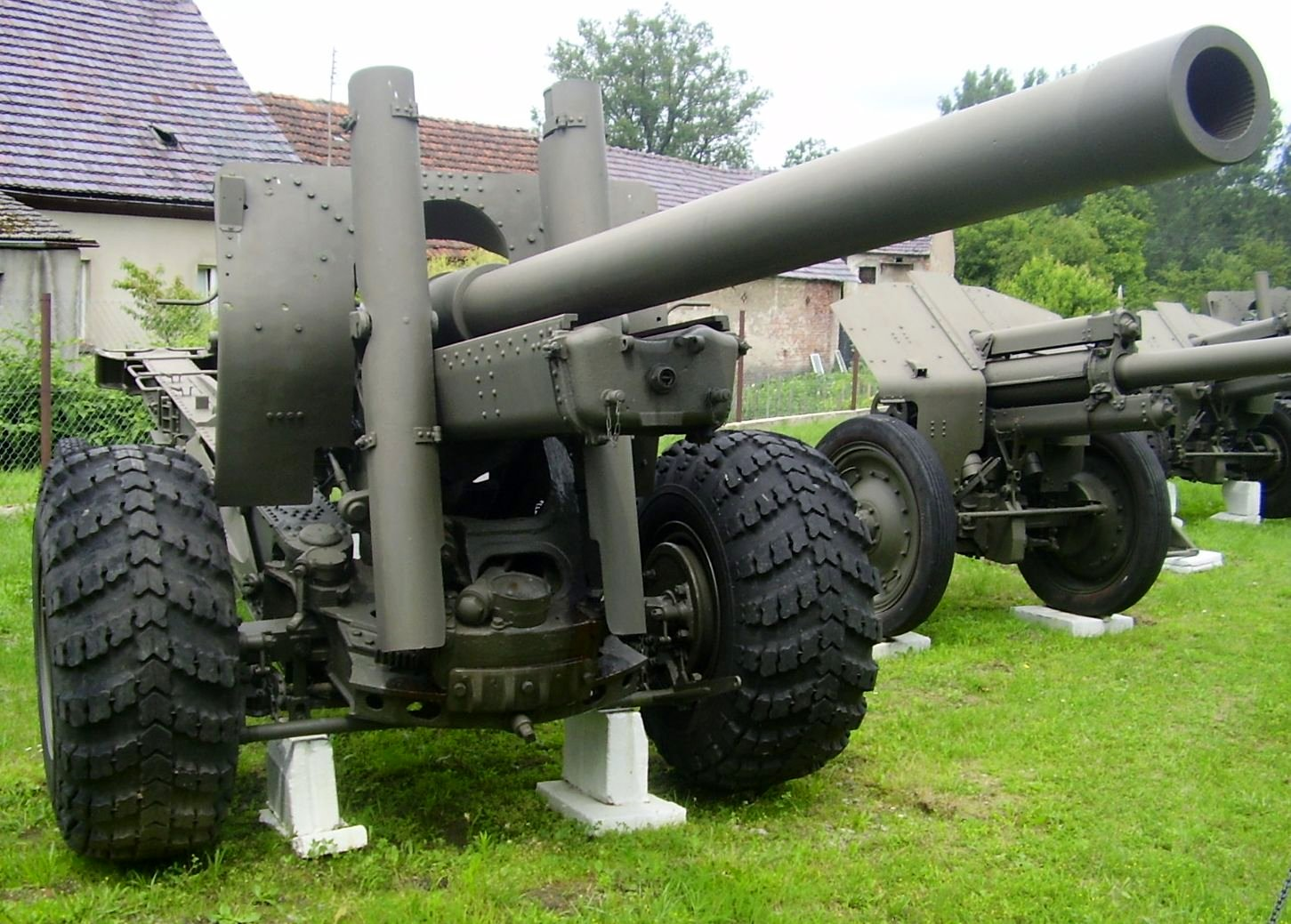
The Polish wz. 1931/37/85

In the early stage of the Great Patriotic War hundreds of A-19s fell into the hands of Wehrmacht. Both variants were adopted – M1931 as 12,2 cm K.390/1(r) and M1931/37 as 12,2 cm K.390/2(r). Germans used a total of 424 of these guns in field and coastal artillery and manufactured ammunition for them.

Germany sold 150 of the captured A-19s to Spain in 1943. This transaction was part of the "Bär Program", a program to complete and modernize the equipment of the Spanish Armed Forces using armament delivered by Germany. Most of these A-19 were assigned to the Corps Field Artillery Regiments of the Spanish Army, each regiment receiving 12 pieces to equip a group. The model was well liked in Spain, and 32 additional pieces were ordered by the Army and produced – with neither documentation nor licenses – by the Trubia Arms Factory. After acquisition of more modern American artillery, the Spanish A-19s were relegated to the artillery regiments of territorial defense units. 173 of the Spanish A-19s were modernized in the 1970s, and the guns remained in service with the Spanish Army until the 1990s.

The Finnish Army captured 25 pieces in 1941 and also pressed them into service. The same designation 122 K/31 was applied to both variants. Because of shortage in heavy tractors, the gun was mostly used in coastal artillery. Four pieces were lost; the rest remained in service after the war. In 1980s some pieces had their barrels replaced with 152 mm barrels of ML-20; the resulting pieces were designated 152 H 37-31. In late 1980s both 152 H 37-31 and the remaining 122 K/31 received new 152 mm L/32 barrels manufactured by Vammas, to become 152 H 88-31.

The Kingdom of Romania captured in 1941 a number of 477 various types of 122 mm howitzers and guns including M1931/37 and the modern ones were used as divisional artillery for units rebuilt after 1941 campaign. Some guns captured by the Romanians were modified and fitted on the initial prototypes of the Mareșal tank destroyer.

The A-19s were used by Polish Armed Forces in the East in 1944–45 and remained in Polish service after the war. In 1952 the Polish Army possessed 63 pieces. In 1980s, in order to improve their mobility, the Polish guns were fitted with wheels from KrAZ-255B truck, resulting in 122 mm armata wz. 1931/37/85.

Yugoslavia received 78 122 mm guns. The People's Army of Vietnam also received A-19s and used them during the Vietnam War.

Other recipients of the M1931/37 were Syria (at least 100 pieces in storage as of 1997) and Egypt. China also purchased a number of the M1931/37 during early stages of the Second Sino-Japanese War.

== Variants ==
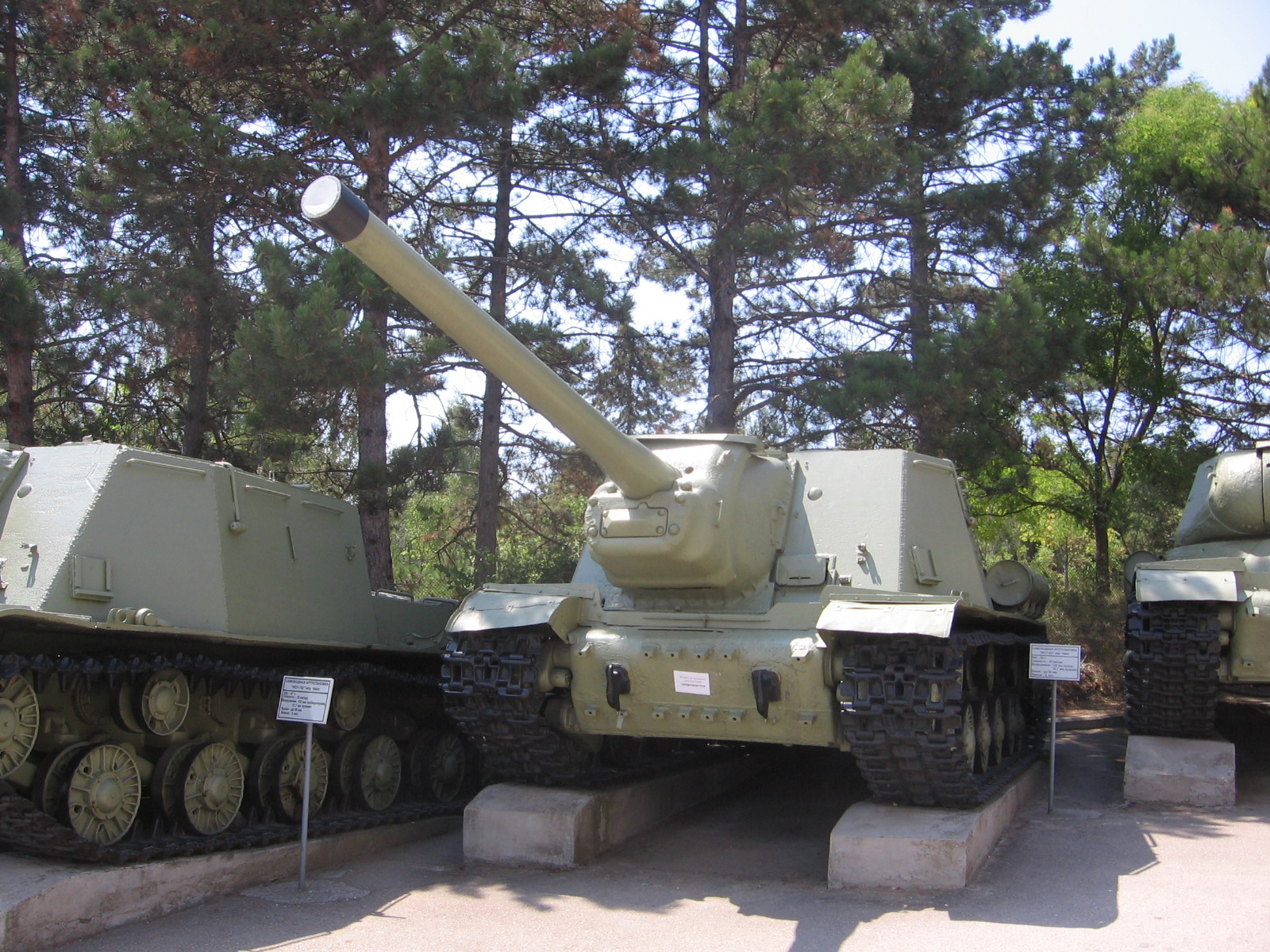
ISU-122, sporting the A-19S gun

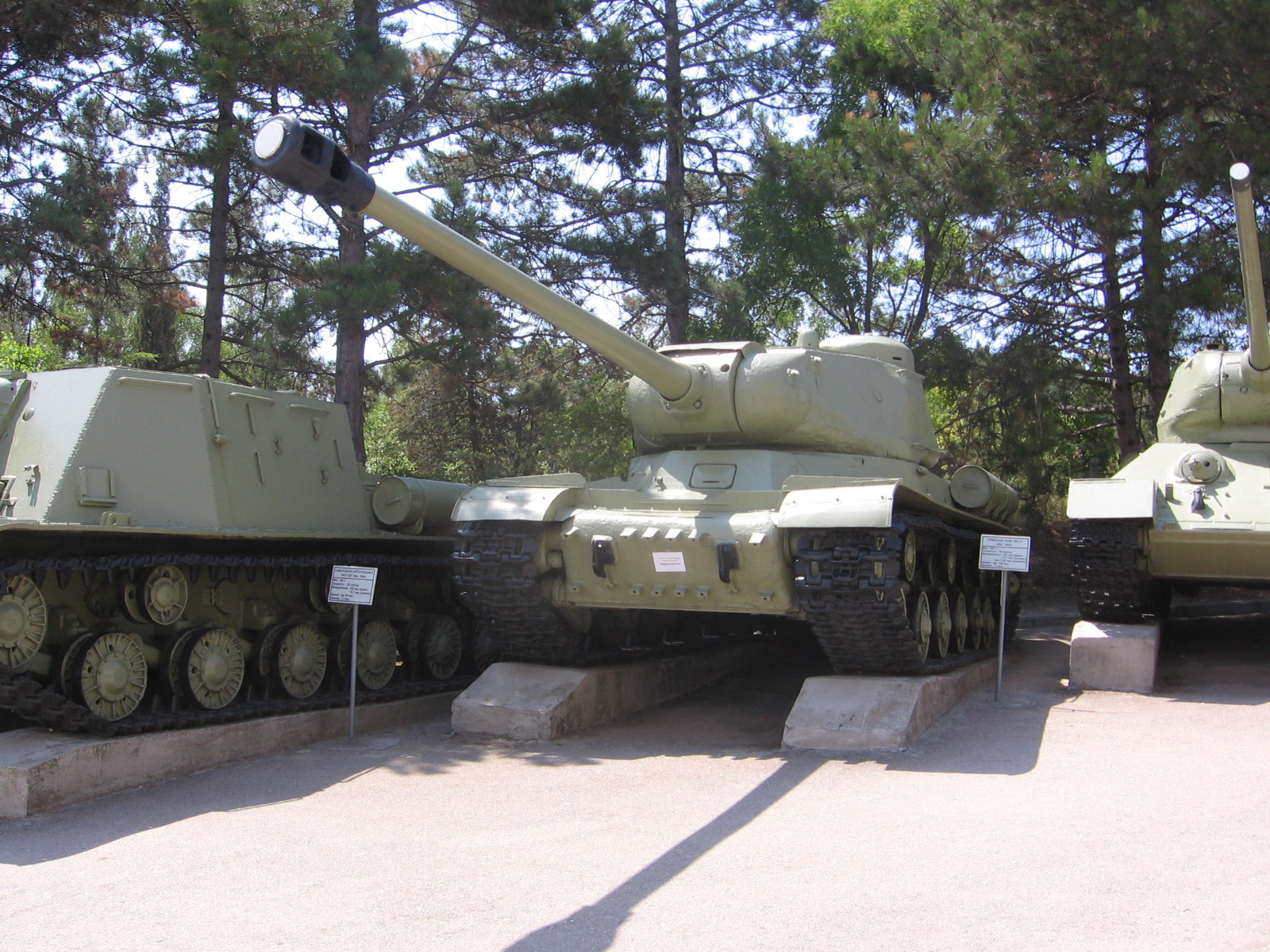
IS-2 tank, with the D-25T

- A-19S – Slightly modified variant of A-19 for use in ISU-122 self-propelled gun.
- D-25 – In 1943 a tank gun based on the A-19 was developed for the new Iosif Stalin tank, in particular because the existing 85 mm tank gun utilized in the early prototypes was deemed insufficient; the resulting prototype was the IS-122. There were, however, safety concerns as the muzzle brake on the gun exploded, nearly killing the attending Marshal Kliment Voroshilov. The fact caused some initial resistance to the adoption of the gun, but Stalin supported the decision to arm the tank named after him with a 122 mm gun. The gun was redesigned to address the safety issue and the resulting weapon was named D-25, analogous to the earlier D-5T 85mm gun.
  - D-25T – tank gun variant (T stands for tankovaya, 'tank' adj.). In the last days of November 1943, Fyodor Petrov's artillery design team tried the D-25 122 mm corps gun on a mounting used for the D-5T 85 mm tank gun against a captured German Panther tank. Tests took place in the Kubinka proving grounds (about 60 km west of Moscow). Firing from a distance of 1200 m, the round pierced the front glacis, made its way through the engine block and penetrated the rear plate too. After the overwhelming success of this trial, necessary adaptations were made during the following weeks, and the model was accepted as the D-25T on 31 December 1943. Production started immediately, to equip the IS-2 tank.
  - D-25S – variant for use in late production ISU-122 self-propelled gun (S for samokhodnaya, 'self-propelled'). The variant of ISU-122 armed with this gun was designated ISU-122S.
- 152 H 88-31 – A Finnish modernization, involving the upgrading of the caliber to 152 mm.
- 122 mm armata wz. 1931/37/85 – A Polish modernization.

== Ammunition ==
The gun fired separate loading, cased charge ammunition, with one of four possible propellant charges – the full, no. 1, no. 2 and no. 3 (the smallest). In addition to 122 mm gun shells, the A-19 could fire 122 mm howitzer shells; however because of lesser durability of those shells they could not be used with full charge.

Available ammunition
Type	Model	Projectile weight, kg	HE weight, kg	Muzzle velocity, m/s	Range, m
Armor-piercing shells
АРНЕ	BR-471	25.0	0.156	800	4,000
АРНЕВС (from early 1945)	BR-471B	25.0		800	4,000
High-explosive and fragmentation shells
HE-Fragmentation, gun	OF-471H	25.0	3.8	800	19,800
HE-Fragmentation, gun	OF-471	25.0	3.6	800	19,800
HE-Fragmentation, howitzer	OF-462	21.7	3.67	765 (charge no. 1)	16,600
HE-Fragmentation, gun	OF-471В
HE-Fragmentation, gun	OF-472
Anti-concrete shells
Anti-concrete, gun	G-471	25.0	2.2	800	20,400
Chemical shells
Fragmentation/chemical, gun	OH-471	25.0		800	19,800
Chemical, howitzer	H-462	21.8		705 (charge no. 2)	19,800

Armour penetration table
АРНЕВС shell BR-471B
Distance, m	Meet angle 60°, mm	Meet angle 90°, mm
500	125	155
1,000	120	145
1,500	110	135
2,000	100	125
3,000	85	105
APHE shell BR-471
Distance, m	Meet angle 60°, mm	Meet angle 90°, mm
500	120	150
1,000	105	130
1,500	95	115
2,000	80	100
3,000	65	75
Different methods of armor penetration measurement were used in different countries / periods. Therefore, direct comparison is often impossible.

== Users ==
A few countries still have the A-19 in reserve units or deep storage.

- Algeria — 100
- Cuba
- Egypt — 36
- Guinea — 12
- North Korea
- Romania — 96: Some/all 122 mm howitzer M1938 (M-30).

== Surviving pieces ==
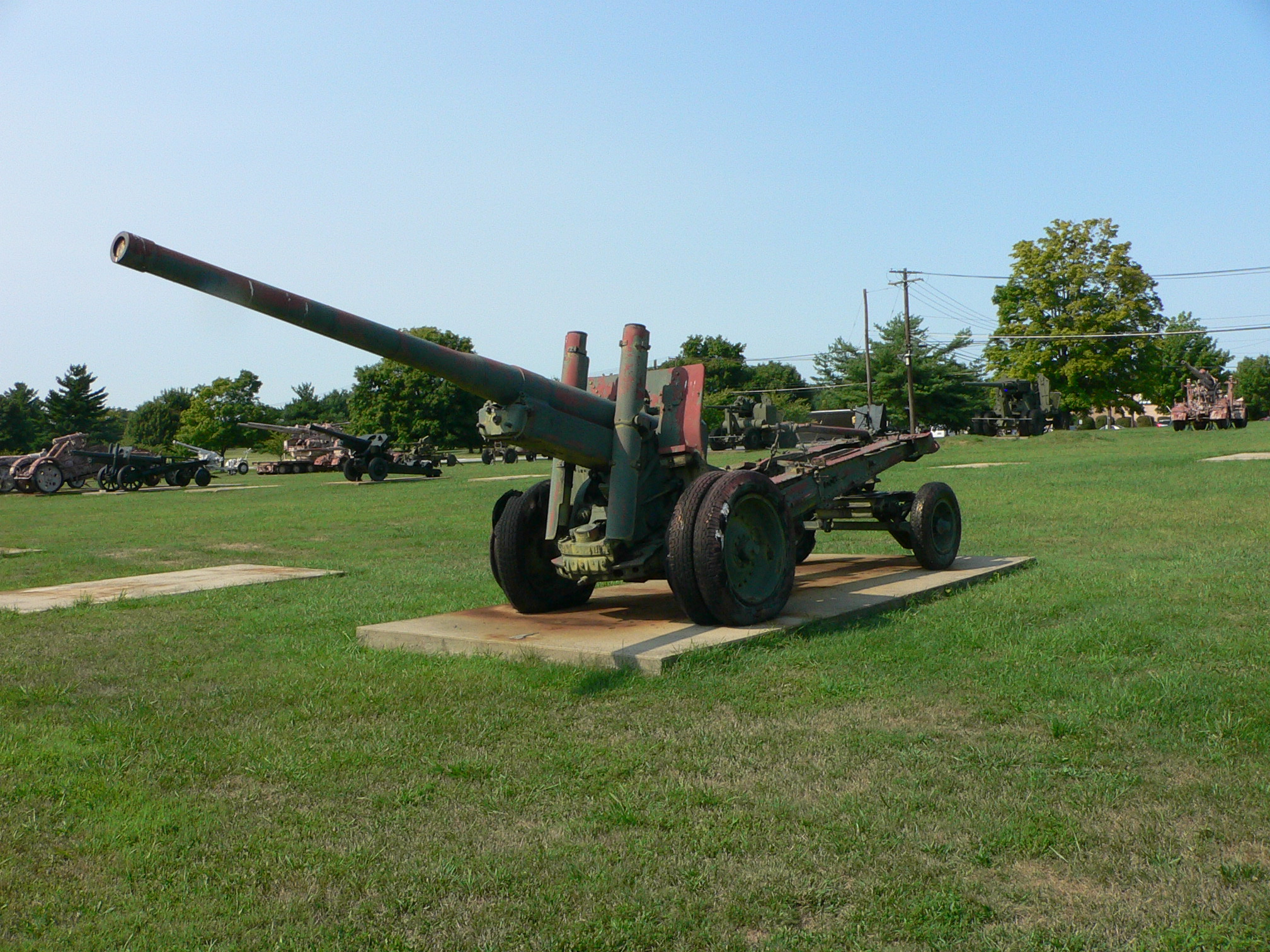
M1931/37 at US Army Ordnance Museum.

The M1931/37 can be seen, among other places:

- In the Central Armed Forces Museum, Moscow, Russia.
- In the Museum of Artillery and Engineering Forces, Saint Petersburg, Russia.
- In Museum of Heroic Defense and Liberation of Sevastopol on Sapun Mountain, Sevastopol, Ukraine.
- In the Poznań Citadel, Poland.
- In the US Army Ordnance Museum in Aberdeen, Maryland, United States.
- In the Fort Sill Artillery Museum in Lawton, Oklahoma, United States.
- In the Military Museum, Dej, Romania.
- In the El Goloso Armor Museum, Madrid.
- In the Historical Military Museum of Cartagena (Spain)
- In a video is possible to see an M1931/37 used by Syrian Army against IS and Al-Nusra in September 2016.

== Sources ==
- Shirokorad A. B. – Encyclopedia of the Soviet Artillery – Mn. Harvest, 2000 (Широкорад А. Б. Энциклопедия отечественной артиллерии. — Мн.: Харвест, 2000., ISBN 985-433-703-0)
- Shirokorad A. B. – The God of War of The Third Reich – M. AST, 2002 (Широкорад А. Б. – Бог войны Третьего рейха. — М.,ООО Издательство АСТ, 2002., ISBN 5-17-015302-3)
- Ivanov A. – Artillery of the USSR in Second World War – SPb Neva, 2003 (Иванов А. – Артиллерия СССР во Второй Мировой войне. — СПб., Издательский дом Нева, 2003., ISBN 5-7654-2731-6)
- Kolomiets M. – The Battle of River Khalkhin-Gol – "Frontovaya Illustratsiya" magazine, no. 2, 2002 (М.Коломиец. – Бои у реки Халхин-Гол. – журнал «Фронтовая иллюстрация», No. 2, 2002)
- Military History Journal, no. 5, 2005 and no. 2, 2006.
- Statistical Compilation No 1 – Red Army on 22 June 1941.
- Ballistic Tables for Corps Guns M1931 and M1931/37 – Voenizdat NKO, 1944.
- Shunkov V. N. – The Weapons of the Red Army, Mn. Harvest, 1999 (Шунков В. Н. – Оружие Красной Армии. — Мн.: Харвест, 1999.) ISBN 985-433-469-4
- Zaloga, Steven (1994), IS-2 Heavy Tank 1944–73, New Vanguard, Osprey, ISBN 1-85532-396-6
- Molina Franco, Lucas (2014). La ayuda militar alemana a España 1939–1945 (Thesis) (in Spanish). Universidad de Valladolid. Facultad de Filosofía y Letras.
- Third Axis Fourth Ally: Romanian Armed Forces in the European War, 1941–1945, May 1, 1995, p. 142, p.224 ISBN 1854092677
