= List of armored fighting vehicles of the Soviet Union =

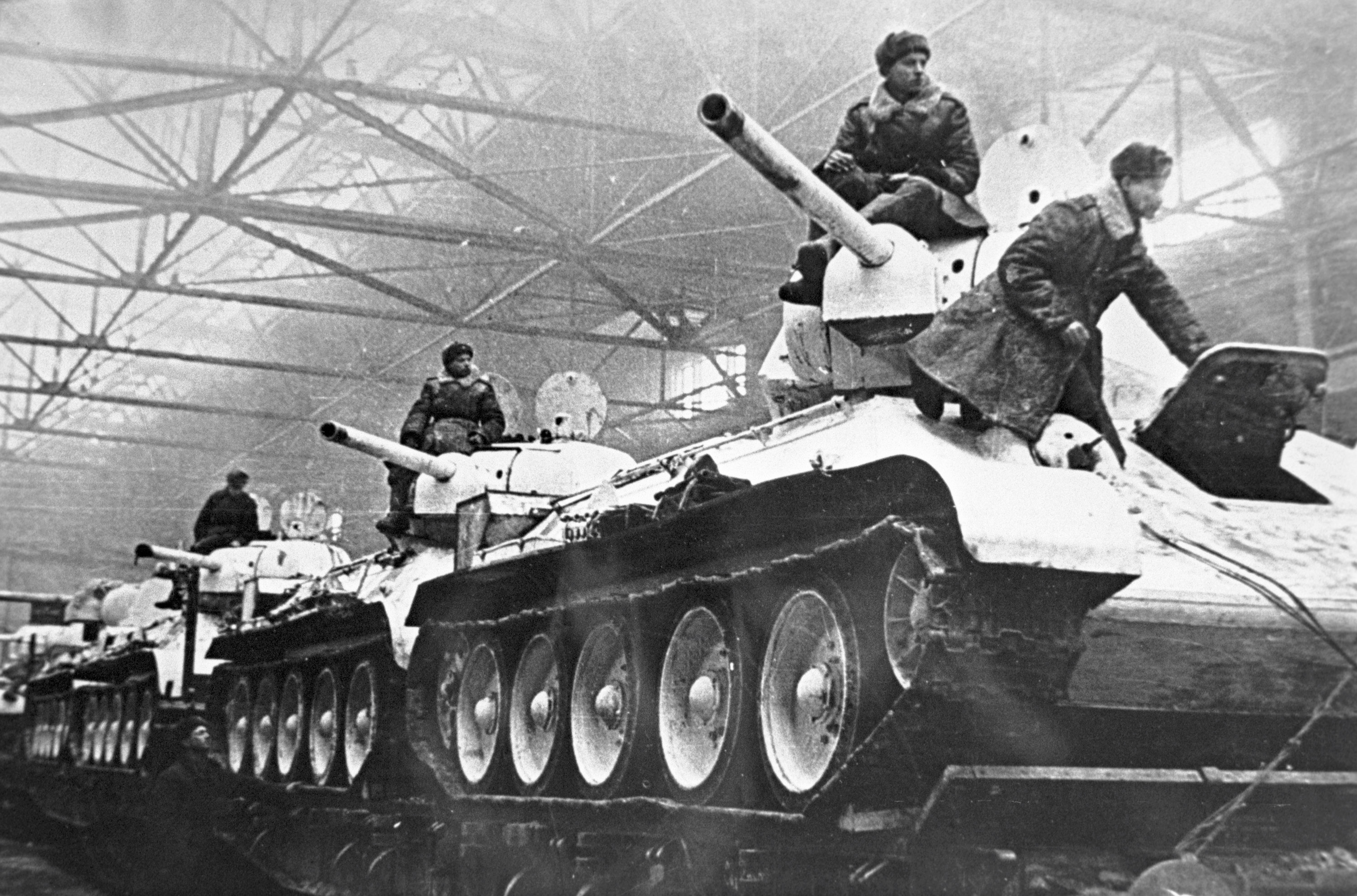
T-34 tanks headed to the front.

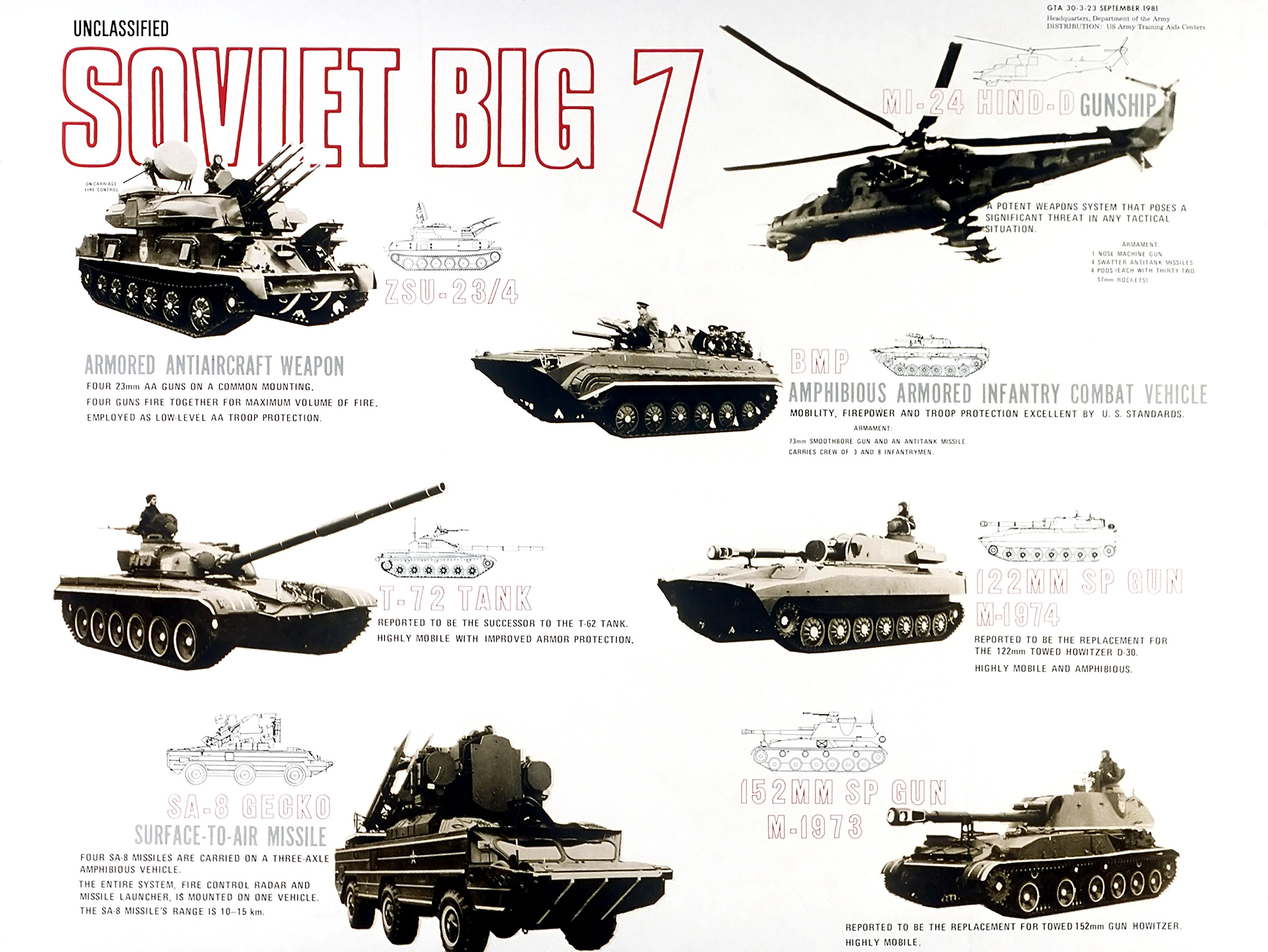
The Soviet "Big 7"

Below is a list of tanks and other armoured fighting vehicles of the Russian empire, Soviet Union, the Russian Federation, and Ukraine.

== Imperial Russia, World War I ==
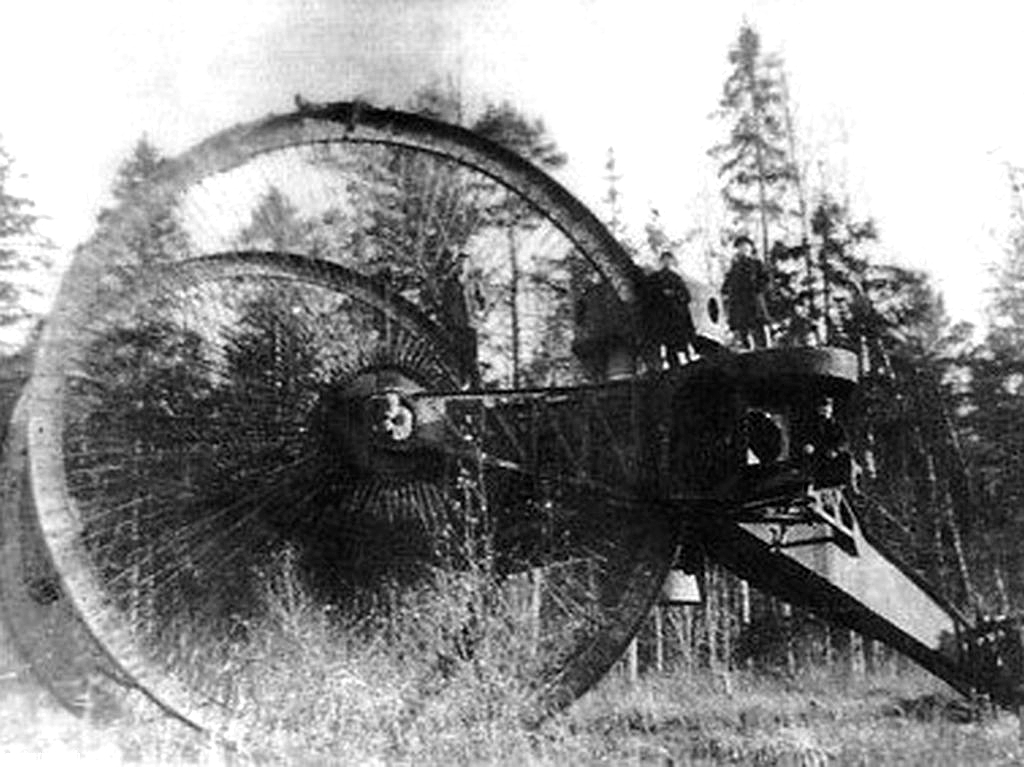
The Tsar Tank

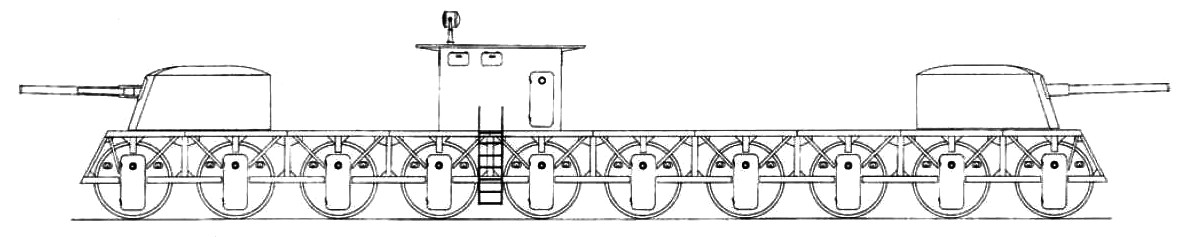
Earth Battleship (project)

=== Armored tractors ===
- Gulkevich's armored tractor
- F. Blinov armored tractor
- Walter armored vehicle

=== Tanks ===
- Vezdekhod
- Vezdekhod No.2
- Tsar tank
- Mendeleev tank (project)
- Rybinsk tank
- Ground Battleship (Земной броненосец) - project

=== Self-propelled guns ===
- Drizhenko self-propelled gun
- Turtle (Navrotsky Self-propelled gun)

== After World War I to early World War II (1918-1940) ==
=== Armored cars ===
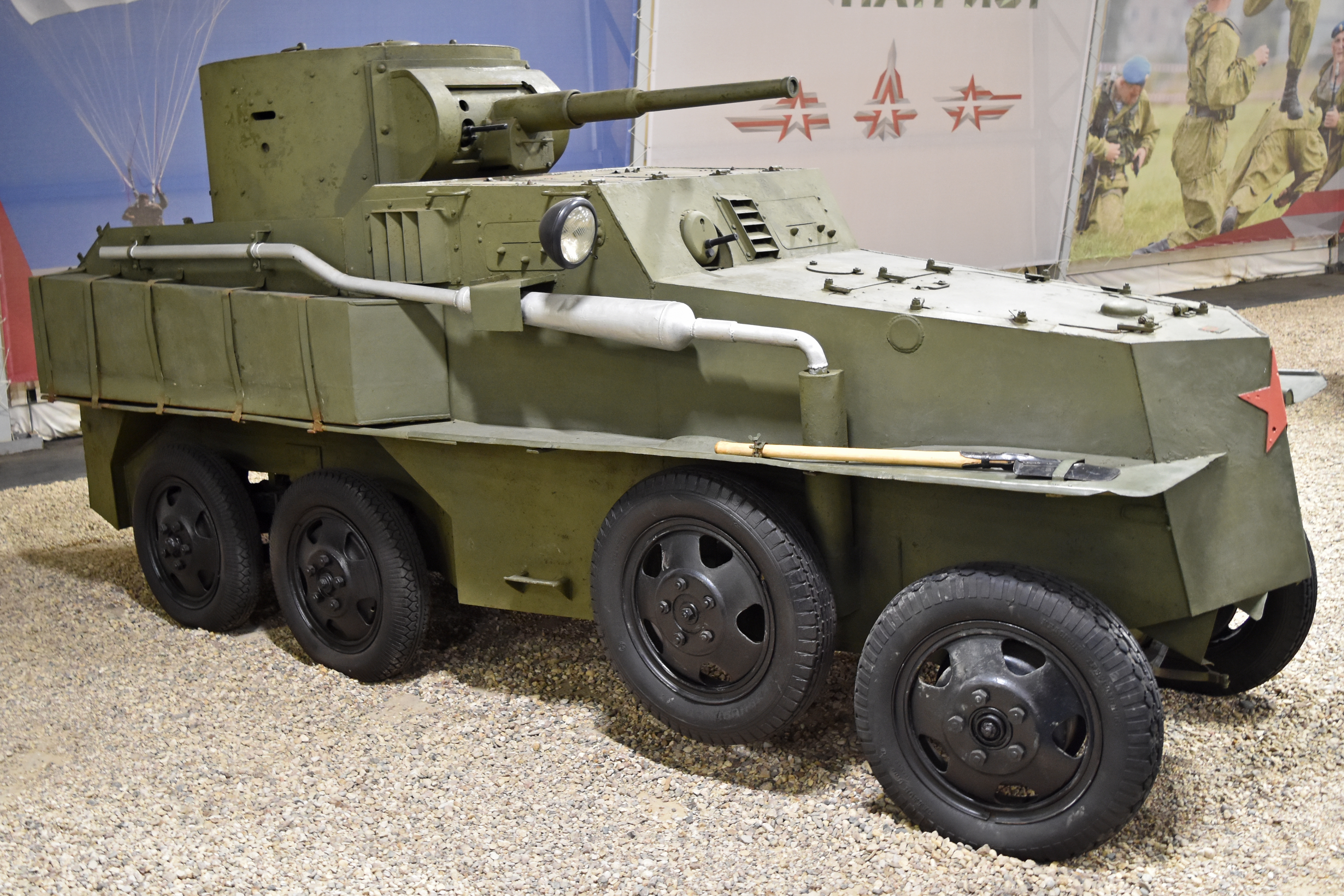
PB-4 Amphibious Armoured Car in Patriot Park

- FAI
- FAI-2
- Broneavtomobil-series armored cars:
  - BA-I
  - BA-3
  - BA-5
  - BA-6
  - BA-6S - half-tracked version of BA-6
  - BA-9
  - BA-10
  - BA-11
  - BA-20
  - BA-21
  - BA-23
  - BA-27
  - BA-30
- BAD-1
- BAD-2
- BDT
- BKhM-1000/800
- D-8 Armored Car
- D-9
- D-12
- D-13
- D-18/37
- DSh
- DTR
- FVV
- GAZ-TK
- KS-18
- PB-4
- PB-7
- Matval

=== Tankettes ===
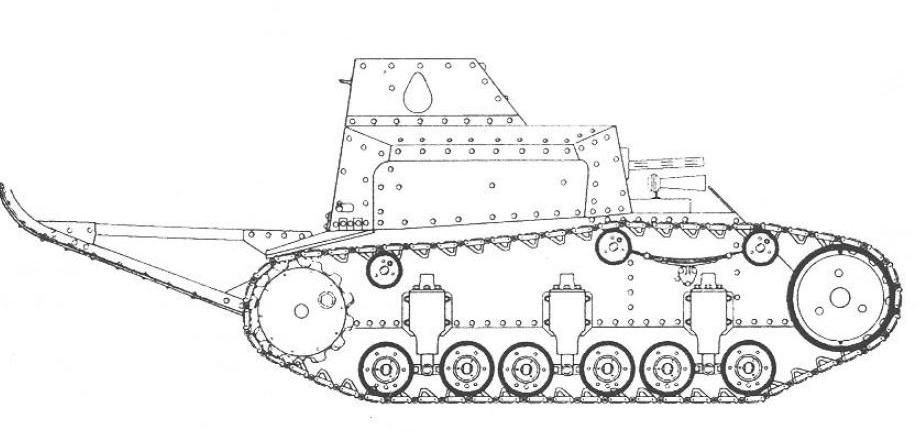
T-17 tankette.

- T-17 - 3 built
- T-23 - 5 built
- T-27 based on the Carden Loyd tankette
- D-7
- D-44
- Shchitonoska
- Fordzon

=== Amphibious light tanks ===
- T-37
- T-38
- T-40
- T-41
- T-33
- T-43-2
- PT-1

=== Light tanks ===
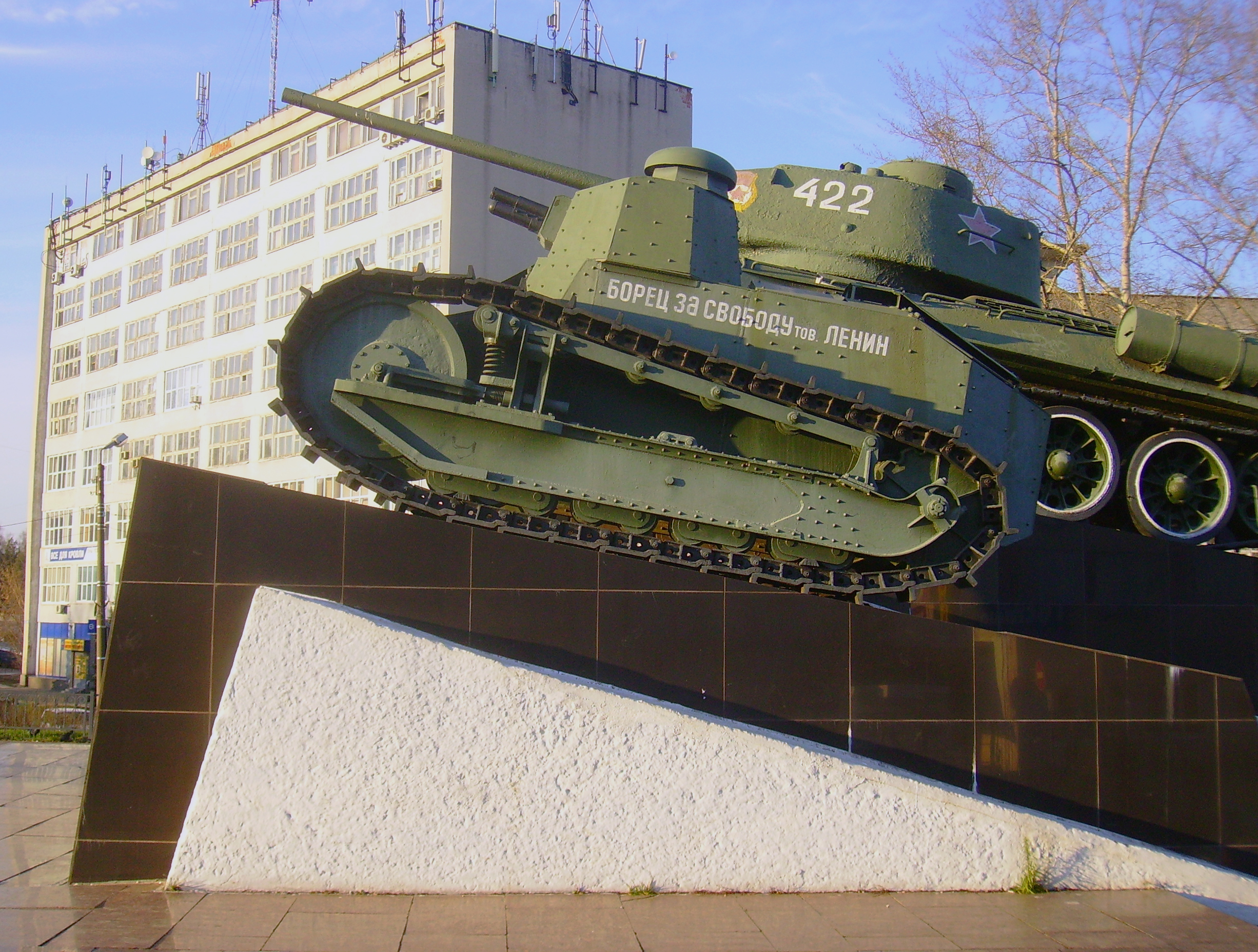
Freedom Fighter Lenin (Russkiy Reno) monument in Nizhny Novgorod

- "Freedom Fighter Lenin" - locally built copy of the Renault FT
- T-18 (MS-1)
- T-19
- T-25 (STZ-25)
- T-26
- T-26-5
- T-46
- BT-2
- BT-5
- RBT-5 - BT-5 variant with torpedo rockets
- BT-6
- BT-7
- BT-7A - BT-7 armed with 76mm KT-28 gun
- BT-7M, or BT-8
- BT-203
- BT-SV, or BT-SW-2
- BT-Tsyganova - a "very fast" version of the BT-7 by N. F. Tsyganova
- Teletank (TT)
- A-20
- STZ-35
- D-38
- TM tank
- 0-10
- Teplokhod AN
- D-10
- D-11
- TMM
- LTTB

=== Medium tanks ===
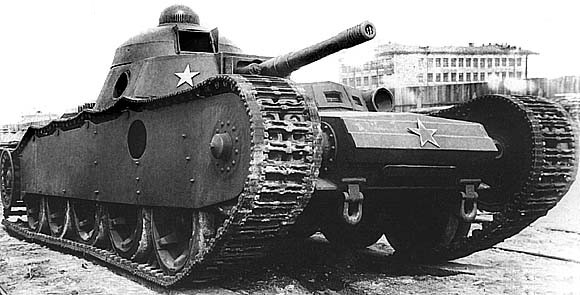
Tank Grotte

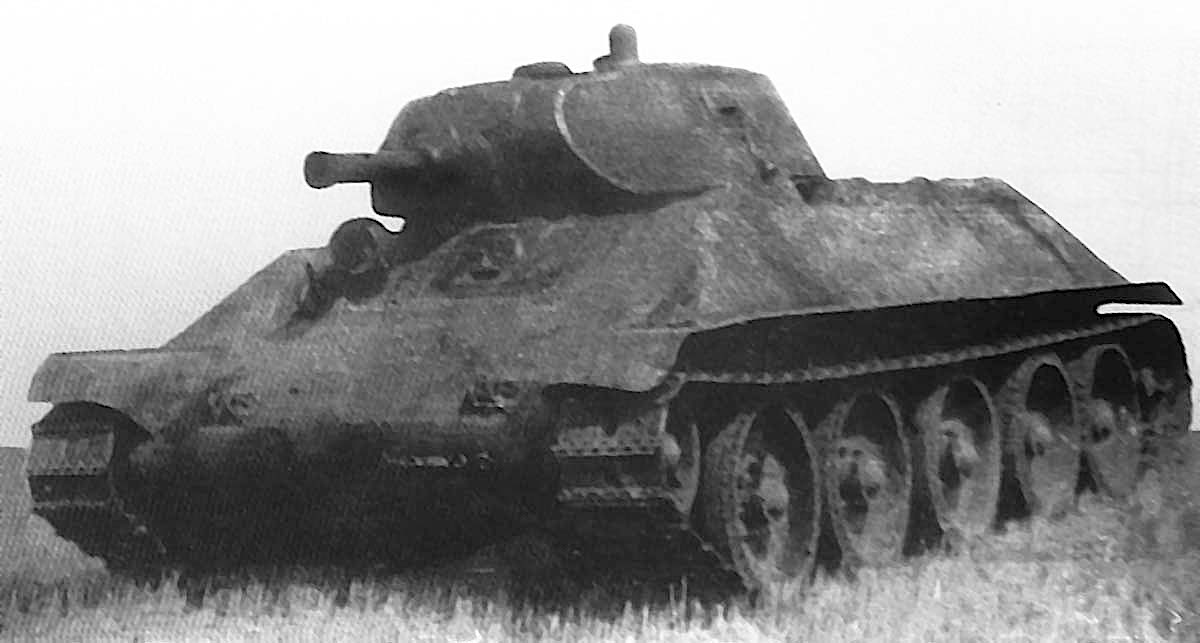
A-32

- T-12
- T-24
- Tank Grotte (TG-1) (experimental)
- T-28
- T-29 (experimental)
- A-32 (T-34 prototype)
- T-34
- T-43
- GUBP
- TA-1
- TA-2
- D-4
- D-5
- IT-3
- Object 112
- Object 115

=== Heavy tanks ===
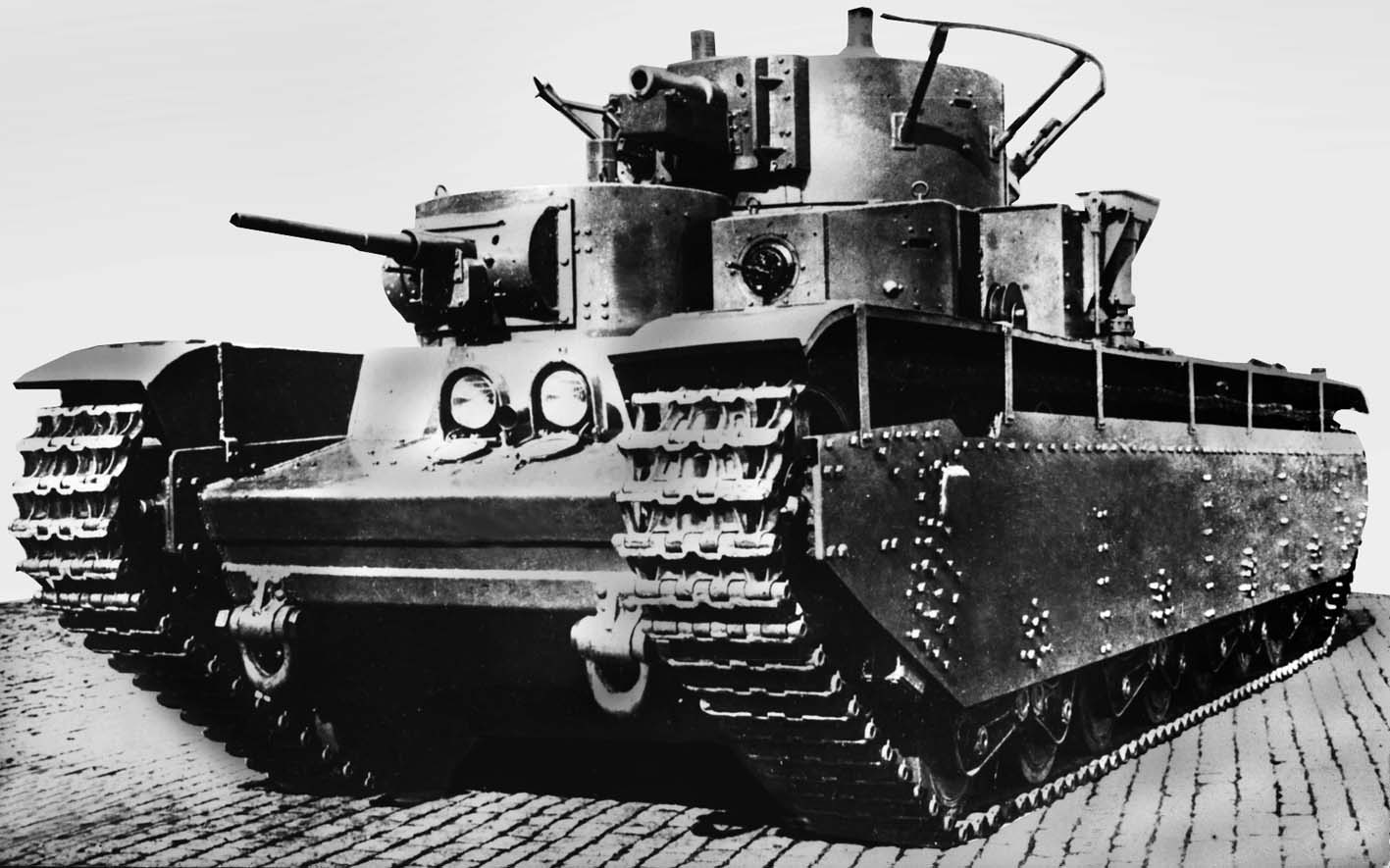
The Т-35 heavy tank followed the interwar trend for tanks with multiple turrets

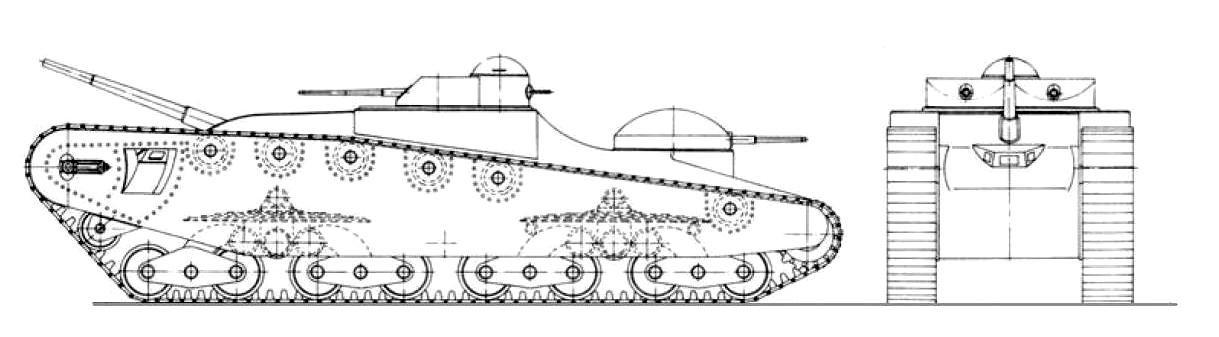
Sirkena heavy tank

- T-35
- T-39
- SMK (Experimental)
- T-100 tank (Experimental)
- KV-0 (Prototype for KV-1)
- T-30
- TP-1
- TA-3
- Sirkena tank project
- Danchenko tank project
- Object 0-50
- Object 103
- T-100-Z
- VL (project)
- TG-V
- TG-VI

=== Tank destroyers and SPGs ===
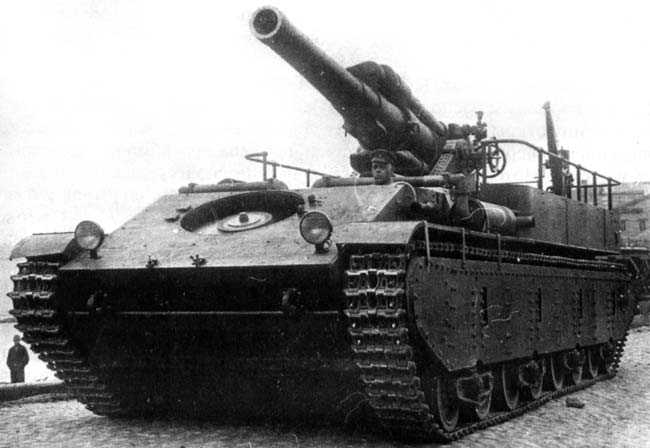
SU-14 in trials, 1934

- 4M
- 29K
- AT-1
- SU-1
- SU-2
- SU-3
- SU-4
- SU-5
- SU-6
- SU-7
- SU-8
- SU-12
- SU-14
- SU-14-1
- SU-14-2
- SU-18
- SU-26
- SU-37
- SU-45
- T-26-4

=== Flame-throwing tanks ===
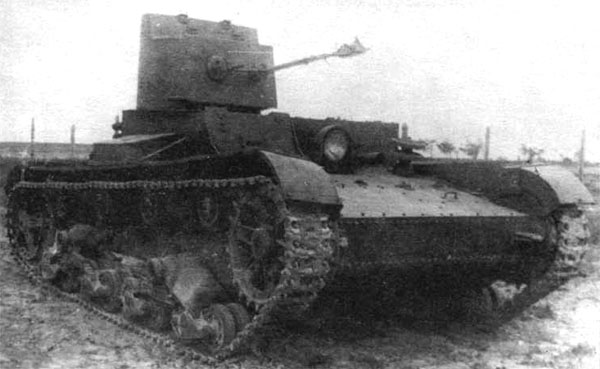
KhT-26

- KhT-26
- OT-27/KhT-27
- MKhT-1
- OT-37/KhT-37
- KhT-130
- KhT-133
- KhT-134
- OT-132
- OT-7
- D-15
- OU-T-26
- Object 218

=== Other vehicles ===
- Antonov A-40 - (Krylya Tanka) single prototype "flying tank"
- Hovercraft tank
- STZ-5

== World War II (1941-1945) ==
The list does not include all vehicles, as there were many more experimental, or otherwise rare vehicles.

=== Armored cars ===
- BA-64
- LB-23
- LB-62
- LB-NATI

=== Tankettes ===
- PPG tankette
- NI tank (Odessa tank)

=== Light tanks ===
- T-40
- T-50
- T-60
- T-70
- T-80 (prototype light tank)
- T-111
- T-116
- T-126 (SP) - up-armored version of T-50
- T-127
- LTP
- MT-25 (proposal tank)
- LTTB (1 prototype)

=== Medium tanks ===
- T-28
- T-34
  - T-34-57
  - T-34-76
  - T-34-85
  - T-34-100
- T-34M (also known as the A-43) (not serially produced)
- T-43 tank (not serially produced)
- T-44
- KV-13 - a KV "universal" tank
- A-44

=== Heavy tanks ===
- T-150
- Kliment Voroshilov tanks:
  - KV-1
  - KV-2
  - KV-1S
  - KV-85 (stopgap) - 135 produced
  - KV-220 (Experimental)
  - KV-8 (Flamethrower)
  - KV-8S (Flamethrower)
  - KV-122 (Prototype)
  - KV-3 (proposed heavy tank)
  - KV-4
  - KV-5 (proposed heavy tank)
- IS tank family tanks:
  - IS-1
  - IS-2
  - IS-3

=== Tank destroyers and assault guns ===
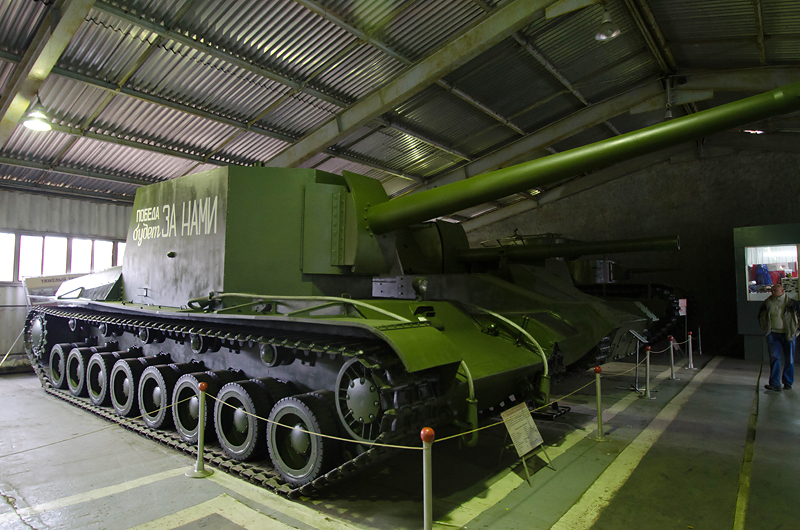
SU-100Y

- AT-1 - "Artillery tank" variant of T-26, prototypes only
- SU-26
- SG-122
- SU-57B
- SU-76
- SU-85
- SU-85A
- SU-100
- SU-100Y - prototype self-propelled gun
- SU-100S
- SU-100M1
- SU-100M2
- Uralmash-1 (SU-101) - prototypes only
- SU-122
- SU-122P
- SU-122-44 - unbuilt project
- SU-152
- ISU-122
- ISU-122S
- ISU-130
- ISU-152
- Object 704
- KV-7 - Experimental self-propelled gun
- U-18
- U-34
- U-35
- ZiK-20

=== Self-propelled guns ===
- ZiS-30
- SU-100Y
- Object 212A
- S-51

=== Self-propelled anti-air ===
- T-90 (Experimental)
- ZUT-37 (Experimental)
- ZSU-37

=== Lend-Lease tanks ===
- Tetrarch
- Valentine Tank
- Churchill Tank
- Matilda II
- M3 Stuart
- M3 Lee
- M4 Sherman
- M10 Wolverine

=== Captured tanks ===
This includes modified captured tanks.

- T-III (T-3) - captured Panzer III
- T-IV (T-4) - captured Panzer IV
- T-V (T-5) - captured Panther tank
- SU-76i - captured Panzer III modified to mount an 76mm S-1 gun on a tank destroyer configuration.
- SU-85i - captured Panzer III modified to mount an 85mm D-5S-85A gun on a tank destroyer configuration.

== After World War II (Soviet era, continued) ==
=== Armored fighting vehicles ===
- BMP-1
- BMP-2
- BMP-3
- BMD-1
- BMD-2
- BMD-3
- BMO-1
- BTR-series AFVs:
  - BTR-D
  - BTR-40
  - BTR-50
  - BTR-60
  - BTR-70
  - BTR-80
  - BTR-112 (Object 112)
  - BTR-152
  - BTR-E152V
- BRDM-1
- BRDM-2
- Objekt 19
- Objekt 659
- Objekt 680
- Objekt 681
- Objekt 688
- Objekt 768
- Objekt 769
- Objekt 911
- Objekt 914
- Objekt 955
- Objekt 1015
- Objekt 1200
- GAZ-50
- K-75
- K-78
- GT-L
- GT-LB
- GT-MU
- MT-LB
- MT-LBu

=== Light tanks ===
- T-100 light tank
- PT-76
- Object 685
- Object 788
- Object 906
- Object 911B
- Object 934
- R-39 (Object 101)

=== Medium and main battle tanks ===
- T-54/T-55
- T-62
- T-64
- T-72
- T-74
- T-80
- Object 140
- Object 142
- Object 167
- Object 172
- Object 172-2M "Buyvol"
- Object 187
- Object 292
- Object 430
- Object 432
- Object 435
- Object 476
- Object 477 "Molot"
- Object 478
- Object 490
- Object 490A
- Object 785
- Object 907
- Object 920

=== Heavy tanks ===
- IS-4
- IS-6 (Experimental)
- IS-7 (Experimental)
- T-10 (IS-8)
- T-10M (1957–1994)
- Object 266
- Object 267
- Object 269
- Object 277
- Object 278
- Object 279 (Experimental)
- Object 705
- Object 706
- Object 726
- Object 770

=== Tank destroyers and assault guns ===
- Object 263 (Cancelled in design phase)
- Object 268 (Experimental)
- SU-100P
- SU-152P
- SU-152G
- Object 120 SU-152 "Taran" (Experimental)
- SU-122-54
- K-73
- ASU-57
- ASU-76
- ASU-85
- BSU-11-57F
- 2S14 Zhalo-S
- 2S15 Norov
- Germes
- Object 574

=== Self-propelled guns ===
- Object 261
- Object 327
- 2A3 Kondensator 2P
- 2S1 Gvozdika
- 2S2 Fialka
- 2S3 Akatsiya
- 2S4 Tyulpan
- 2S5 Giatsint-S
- 2S7 Pion
- 2S8 Astra
- 2S9 Nona
- 2S11 Giatsint-SK
- 2S17-2 Nona-SV
- 2S18 Pat-S
- 2S19 Msta
- 2S21 Msta-K
- 2S22 Kolba-Z
- 2S23 Nona-SVK
- 2S24 Deva
- 2S27 Rif
- 2S30 Iset
- 2S31 Vena
- 2B1 Oka
- Otsek
- Obzhimka
- Object 416

=== Self-propelled anti-air ===
- ZSU-57-2
- ZSU-23-4 (Shilka)
- ZSU-37-2 Yenisei
- 9K35 Strela-10
- 9K31 Strela-1
- 9K33 Osa
- 9K330 Tor
- 2K12 Kub
- 2K11 Krug
- 2K22 (Tunguska)
- Object 130
- Object 530
- ZTPU-2
- ZPRK Roman
- S-125 Neva

=== Tanks and AFVs with ATGMs ===
- IT-1
- Object 170
- Object 282
- Object 286
- Object 431
- Object 287
- Object 747
- Object 757
- Object 772
- Object 775
- Object 778
- Object 780
- Object 906B
- Object 920
- 2P27 Shmel'
- 2P32 Falanga
- 9P19 Glaz
- 9P110 Obod
- 9P122
- 9P124
- 9P133
- 9P137 Fleyta
- 9P148 Konkurs
- 9P149 Shturm-S

=== Rocket launchers ===
- TOS-1
- BM-24T
- Object 280

=== Flame-throwing tanks ===
- OT-54
- TO-55
- Object 483

=== Laser tanks ===
- 1K11 Stilet
- 1K17 Szhatie
- SLK Sangvin

=== Other vehicles and AFVs ===
- SPU-117 (Object 117)
- Object 288
- Progvev-T

== Post-Soviet vehicles ==
=== Armored fighting vehicles ===
- T-15 IFV (Russia)
- BMD-4 (Russia)
- BTR-3 (Ukraine)
- BTR-4 (Ukraine)
- BTR-90 (Russia)
- BMPT Terminator (Russia)
- Kamaz Typhoon (Russia)
- GAZ Tigr (Russia)
- Kozak-2, 5, and 7 (Ukraine)
- Varta and Varta 2 (Ukraine)
- Novator and Novator 2 (Ukraine)

=== Light tanks ===
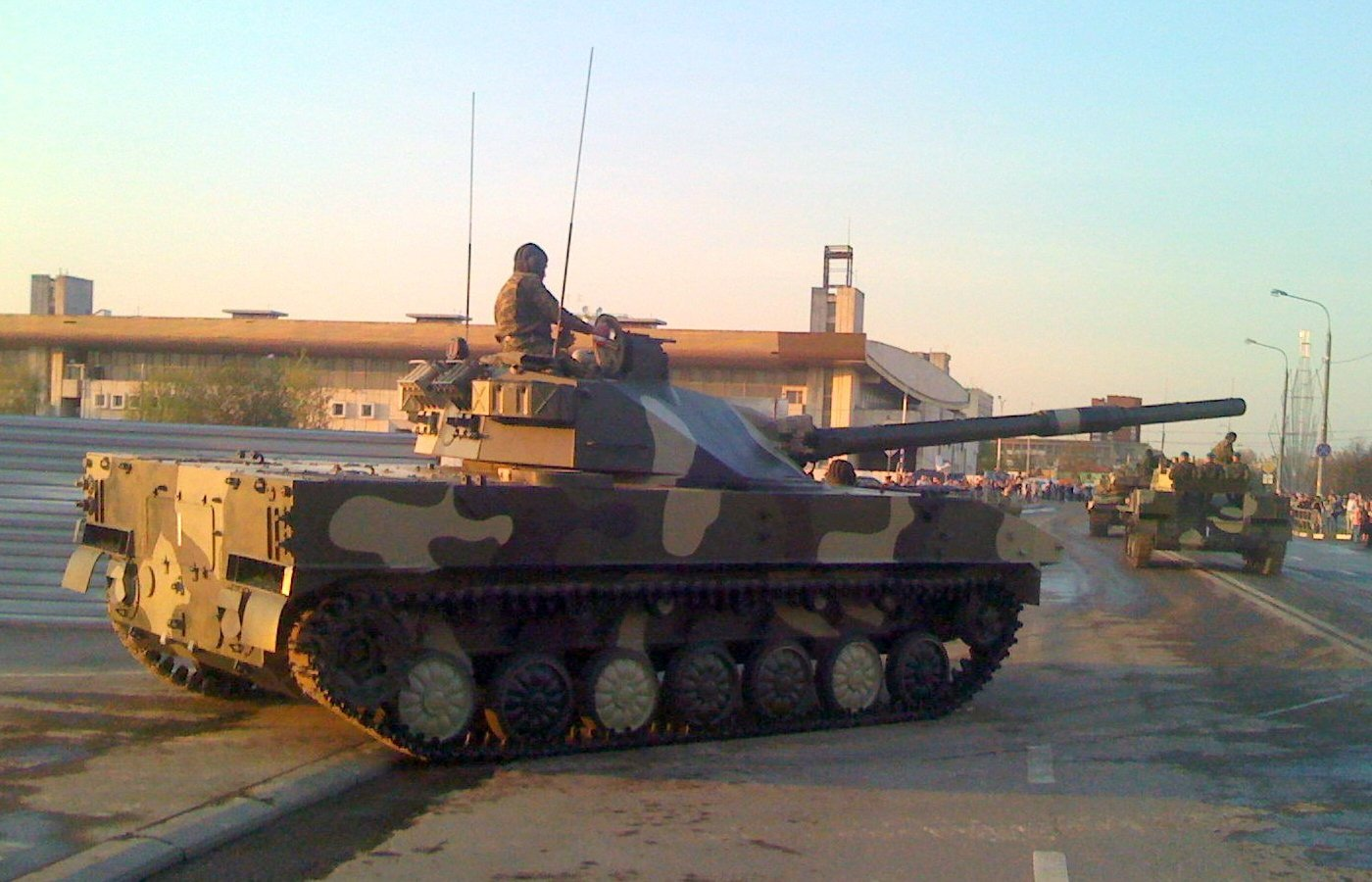
2S25 Sprut-SD

- 2S25 Sprut-SD (Russia)

=== Medium and main battle tanks ===
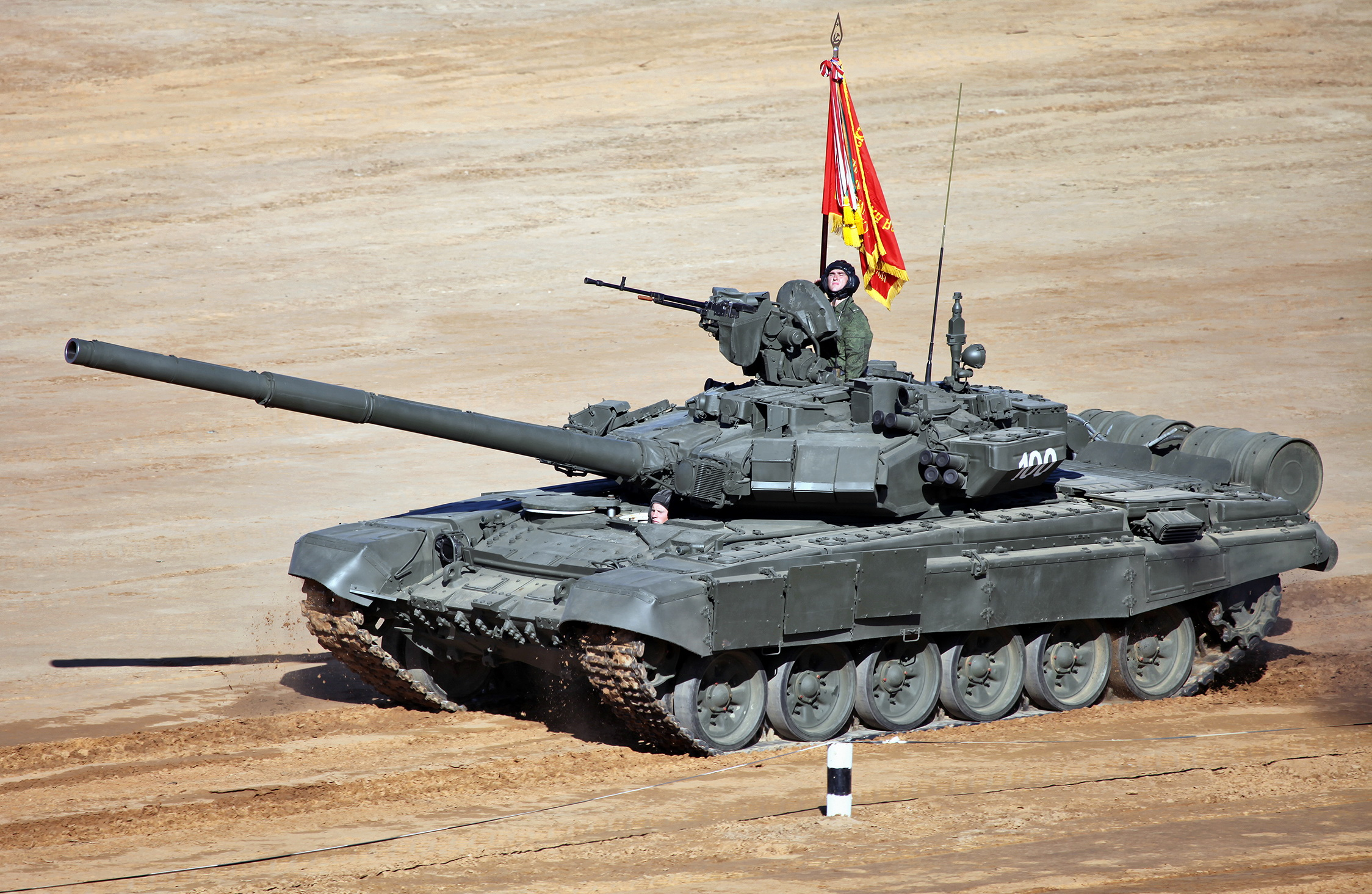
T-90A

- T-84 (Ukraine)
- T-90 (Russia)
- Black Eagle (Russia)
- T-95 (Russia)
- T-14 Armata (Russia)
- BM Oplot (Ukraine)

=== Self-propelled guns ===
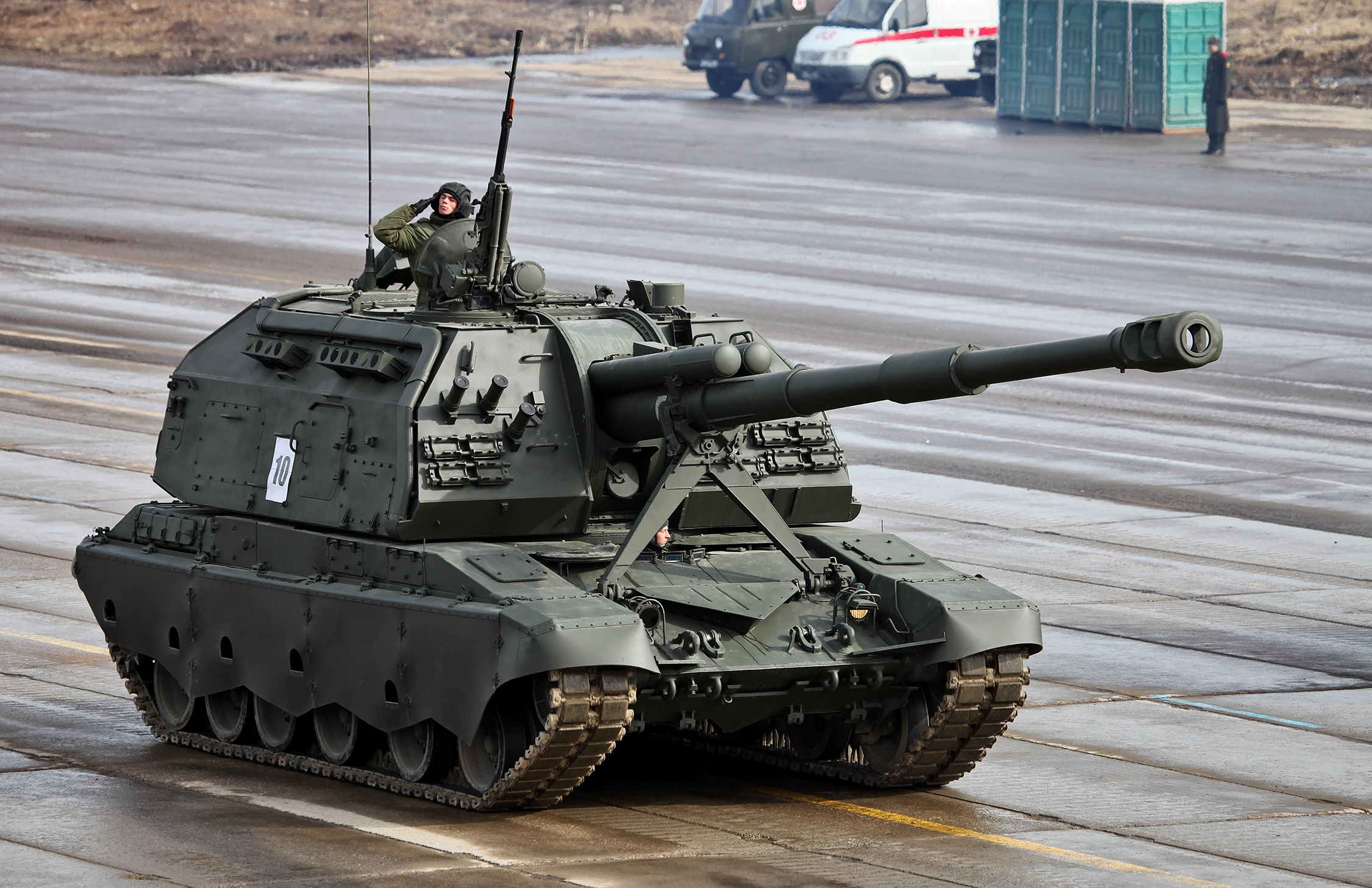
2S19 Msta-S

- 2S22 Bohdana (Ukraine)
- 2S35 Koalitsiya-SV (Russia)
- 2S42 Lotus (Russia)

== See also ==
- Tanks in the Soviet Union
- List of armoured fighting vehicles of Ukraine
- List of Soviet tank factories
