= KV-4 =

Soviet super-heavy tank project

The KV-4 (Object 224; Russian: КВ-4) was a proposed Soviet heavy break-through tank, developed during World War II as a part of the Kliment Voroshilov tank design series.

== Design history ==
In early 1941, Soviet intelligence reported on the production of new German heavy tanks. Prior to the start of Operation Barbarossa, the main heavy tank in service in the Red Army was the KV-1, which armour was, at the time, impenetrable by any tank-mounted weapon then in service. However, this new report caused alarm within the Soviet high command, and thus they decided to work on the design of a new heavy tank destined to counter the new threat.

In the spring of 1941 the director of the Kirov Plant (LKZ) was instructed by a decree of the NKO of the USSR to work on a design of a new tank with two guns, 125-130 mm armor of the frontal part of the hull. This new tank was intended to use the new 107mm ZiS-6 gun which was being developed at Plant #92, and the 45mm 20-K gun as a secondary armament

Since there was no experience of such work at the Kirov plant, in April 1941 the head of SKB-2 Zh. Kotin involved almost all the engineers of his design bureau in the design of this tank and put it on a competitive basis. Sources differ as to the designers involved in the project, but there were about 20 different design proposals, each with varying solutions for the positions of the guns, turrets and hull mountings, armour and overall weight.

Basic armour was to be 125 to 130 mm and up to 150 mm over vulnerable areas. The lightest design was 82.5 tonnes and the heaviest was 107.7 tonnes. All had a 107mm ZiS-6 main gun and all but one had a second tank gun. Different variants had various auxiliary weapons: 45 mm 20-K guns, 76 mm cannons, machineguns and flamethrowers in addition to the main gun. Crew requirements were from 5 to 9 men.

=== The 107 mm ZiS-6 guns ===
The F-42 107 mm tank gun was created in Plant #92, in a design bureau under the supervision of V. Grabin. The F-42 was based on the F-39 95 mm tank gun (see 107mm divisional gun) and it was finished in the autumn of 1940. By the beginning of 1941, the new gun had been factory tested in a field casemate. In March 1941 it was tested in the turret of a KV-2 tank. The ZiS-6 gun passed factory testing by June 1941, after which it was sent to the Artillery Scientific Test Range at Leningrad.

According to V. Grabin ("Oruzhie Pobedy" - "Weapons of Victory") about 600 ZiS-6 guns had been finished by the autumn of 1941. Those guns were all destroyed because the tanks were never going to be made. The plants chief designer wrote that "five serially-produced ZiS-6 cannons were manufactured in July–August 1941, after which their production was halted because the heavy tanks were not ready". Those documents had been signed by V. Grabin.

=== Fate ===
The project was cancelled due to the outbreak of the war. In June 1941, all work on the KV-4 was curtailed in favor of the KV-5, which was being designed in parallel and was deemed more feasible. However, all the capacities of LKZ and ChTZ were directed to the construction of serial KV and T-34 tanks, so no prototypes of the KV-4 or KV-5 were built, and they remained only in blueprints.

== See also ==
- List of Soviet tanks
