= SU-122 =

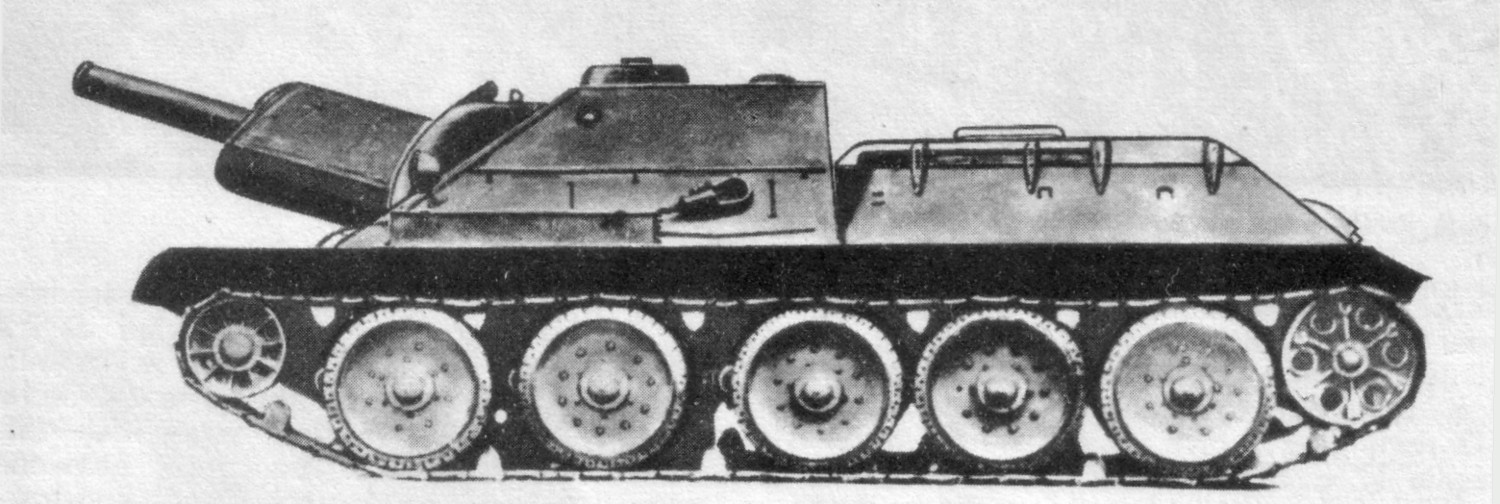
- SU-122
- Type: Self-propelled howitzer
- Place of origin: Soviet Union

Service history
- Used by: Soviet Union
- Wars: World War II: Eastern Front

Production history
- Designer: F. F. Petrov
- Designed: 15 April – December, 1942
- Manufacturer: UZTM
- Produced: December 1942 – summer 1943
- No. built: 638
- Variants: See variants

Specifications
- Mass: 30.9 tonnes (68,122 lb)
- Length: 6.95 m (22 ft 10 in)
- Width: 3 m (9 ft 10.1 in)
- Height: 2.32 m (7 ft 7 in)
- Crew: 5
- Armor: 45 mm (1.77 in)
- Main armament: 122 mm M-30S howitzer
- Secondary armament: none
- Engine: Klimov model V-2 V-12 diesel engine 493 hp (368 kW) (500 PS)
- Power/weight: 16 hp/tonne
- Suspension: Christie
- Operational range: Road: 210 km (130 mi); 300 km (190 mi) (with added fuel tanks); Cross-country: 120 km (75 mi); 150 km (93 mi) (with added fuel tanks)
- Maximum speed: 55 km/h (34 mph)

The SU-122 (from Samokhodnaya Ustanovka 122 mm) was a Soviet self-propelled howitzer or assault gun used during World War II. The number "122" in the designation represents the caliber of the main armament, a 122 mm M-30S howitzer. The chassis was that of the T-34.

== Development history ==
The Soviet High Command became interested in assault guns following the success of German Sturmgeschütz IIIs. Assault guns had some advantages over tanks with turrets. The lack of a turret made them cheaper to produce. They could be built with a larger fighting compartment and could be fitted with bigger and more powerful weapons on a given chassis. However, assault guns generally aim by orienting the entire vehicle, and were thus less suited for close combat than tanks with turrets.

In April 1942, design bureaus were asked to develop several assault guns with various armament: 76.2 mm ZiS-3 divisional field guns and 122 mm M-30 howitzers for infantry support, and 152 mm ML-20 howitzers for attacking enemy strongholds.

A prototype assault gun, armed with the 122 mm howitzer and built on the German Sturmgeschütz III chassis was developed, designated SG-122. Only 20 of these were completed. Production was halted when the vehicle was found to be hard to maintain and judged to be unsuccessful.

Simultaneously, an SPG based on the T-34 medium tank was also developed. Initially, the T-34's chassis was selected for the 76.2 mm F-34 gun. This vehicle, the U-34, was created in the summer of 1942 at UZTM (Uralmashzavod – Uralsky Machine Building factory) design bureau, by N. W. Kurin and G. F. Ksjunin. It was a tank destroyer with the same armament as the T-34, but without a turret. The vehicle was 70 cm lower than a T-34, had thicker armor, and was 2 tonnes lighter. It did not enter production.

UZTM then worked on combining features of the U-34 and the SG-122. Initial design work was completed between July and August 1942. The project emphasized minimizing modifications to the platform and the howitzer. It used the same chassis, superstructure, engine and transmission as the U-34 and was armed with (the then new) 122 mm M-30S howitzer from F. F. Petrov's design bureau. This vehicle also used the same gun bed cover and mountings as the SG-122, to keep costs low and simplify production. It had 45 mm thick frontal armor. The M-30S howitzer could be elevated or depressed between −3° and +26° and had 10° of traverse. The five-man crew consisted of a driver, gunner, commander and two loaders.

By 25 November 1942, the first U-35 prototype was ready. Trials ran from 30 November to 19 December 1942, and uncovered various faults in the design, including insufficient elevation, a flawed shell transfer mechanism, poor ventilation for the crew compartment, and the fact that the commander had to assist in operating the gun, which made him unable to successfully carry out his other duties. The U-35 entered service with the Red Army as the SU-35 (later renamed SU-122) despite these faults.

Production SU-122s were based on an improved prototype built after trials were conducted. They incorporated several modifications, including slightly less sloped front armor to ease production, modified layout of the fighting compartment (the location of crew member stations and ammunition racks were changed), fewer vision slots, and a periscope for the commander. The first production vehicles were completed before 1943.

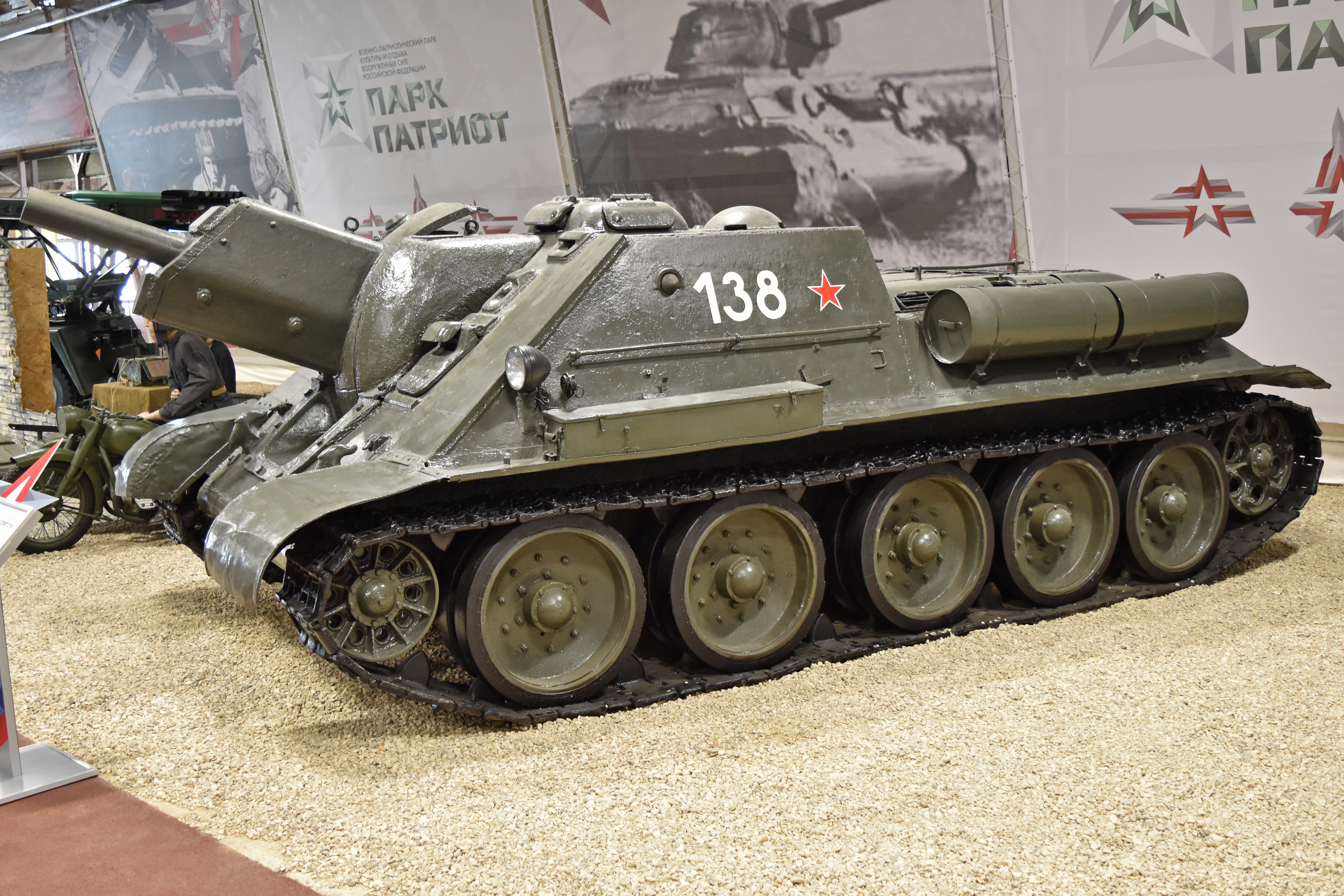
SU-122 in Kubinka Tank Museum

== Production history ==
SU-122 production began in December 1942 with 27 vehicles built that month. The original plan for production beyond that point was to produce 100 SU-122s each month. Production continued until the summer of 1943, by which time a total of 638 SU-122s had been built.

== Service history ==
The first SU-122s produced in December 1942 were sent to training centers and two new combat units, the 1433rd and 1434th self-propelled artillery regiments. Initially, each of these mixed regiments consisted of two batteries with four SU-122s each and four batteries with four SU-76 tank destroyers each. Each regiment had an added SU-76 tank destroyer as a command vehicle. It was planned to raise 30 self-propelled artillery regiments operating within armoured and mechanized corps.

In January 1943, the 1433rd and 1434th self-propelled artillery regiments were sent to the Volkhov Front near Leningrad as part of the 54th Army. On 14 January, they saw combat for the first time in Smierdny region. After that, it was decided SU-122s should follow between 400 m and 600 m behind the attacking tanks; sometimes this distance was shortened to between 200 m and 300 m.

The use of SU-76 tank destroyers together with SU-122s proved unsuccessful. Based on combat experience, the organization of self-propelled artillery regiments was changed; the new regimental organization consisted of two batteries of SU-76 tank destroyers and three batteries of SU-122s, for a total of 20 self-propelled guns. In April, the organization of self-propelled artillery regiments was again changed. Separate regiments were created for SU-76 tank destroyers (light self-propelled artillery regiment) and SU-122s (medium self-propelled artillery regiment).

The medium self-propelled artillery regiment consisted of four batteries of four SU-122s each. Each regiment was also equipped with either an added SU-122 or a T-34 for the commander and a BA-64 armoured car. This organization remained in place until the start of 1944 when the SU-122 began to be replaced by the SU-152, ISU-122 and ISU-152 heavy self-propelled guns, and the SU-85 tank destroyers.

The SU-122 proved effective in its intended role of direct fire on strongholds. The massive concussion of the 122 mm high explosive round was reportedly enough to blow the turret off even a Tiger I if a direct hit was scored, a trait shared with the larger 152 mm howitzers. A new BP-460A high-explosive anti-tank (HEAT) projectile was introduced in May 1943; however, its primitive warhead design was only minimally more effective than brute concussive effects of the older high explosive shell. However, like most howitzers, the accuracy of the M-30 was less than that of contemporary weapons designed for anti-tank warfare.

At least one SU-122 was captured by the German Army.

Few SU-122s survived the war. Currently only one exists and is on display in the Kubinka Tank Museum.

== Variants ==
The SU-122 had no variants that went into mass production. The T-34 chassis of the SU-122 was further adapted as part of the later SU-85 self-propelled gun.

=== SU-122M ===
Even as the SU-122 was being mass-produced, its design was being refined primarily with an eye to reduce production costs. The M-30S armament proved poorly suited for purpose, in spite of its prior recommendation by the GAU RKKA artillery committee. The howitzer took a lot of space and required both commander and gunner to operate it in order to fire. Because of this, in January 1943, work began on fitting the SU-122 with a different howitzer.

The prototype SU-122M was built in April 1943. It featured a bigger fighting compartment as well as an individual driver's hatch. The M-30S howitzer, mounted on the floor of the vehicle, was replaced by the more modern D-11 howitzer (a variant of U-11 howitzer). However, the SU-122M was not put into production due to a decision to proceed with the SU-85 instead.

=== SU-122-III ===
Another attempt to create an improved SU-122 replacement took an SU-85 chassis and paired it with the 122-mm D-6 howitzer, which was lighter and smaller than the U-11 howitzer. This was unsuccessful, due to the unreliability of the howitzer's recoil mechanism and its poor anti-tank abilities. Subsequent wartime design work on 122 mm self-propelled howitzers was cancelled.

== Bibliography ==
- Zaloga, Steven J.; Grandsen, James (1984). Soviet Tanks and Combat Vehicles of World War Two. Arms and Armour Press. ISBN 0-85368-606-8.

== See also ==
- List of Soviet tanks – covers all periods
