= D-8 armored car =

D-8 (Dyrenkov-8)
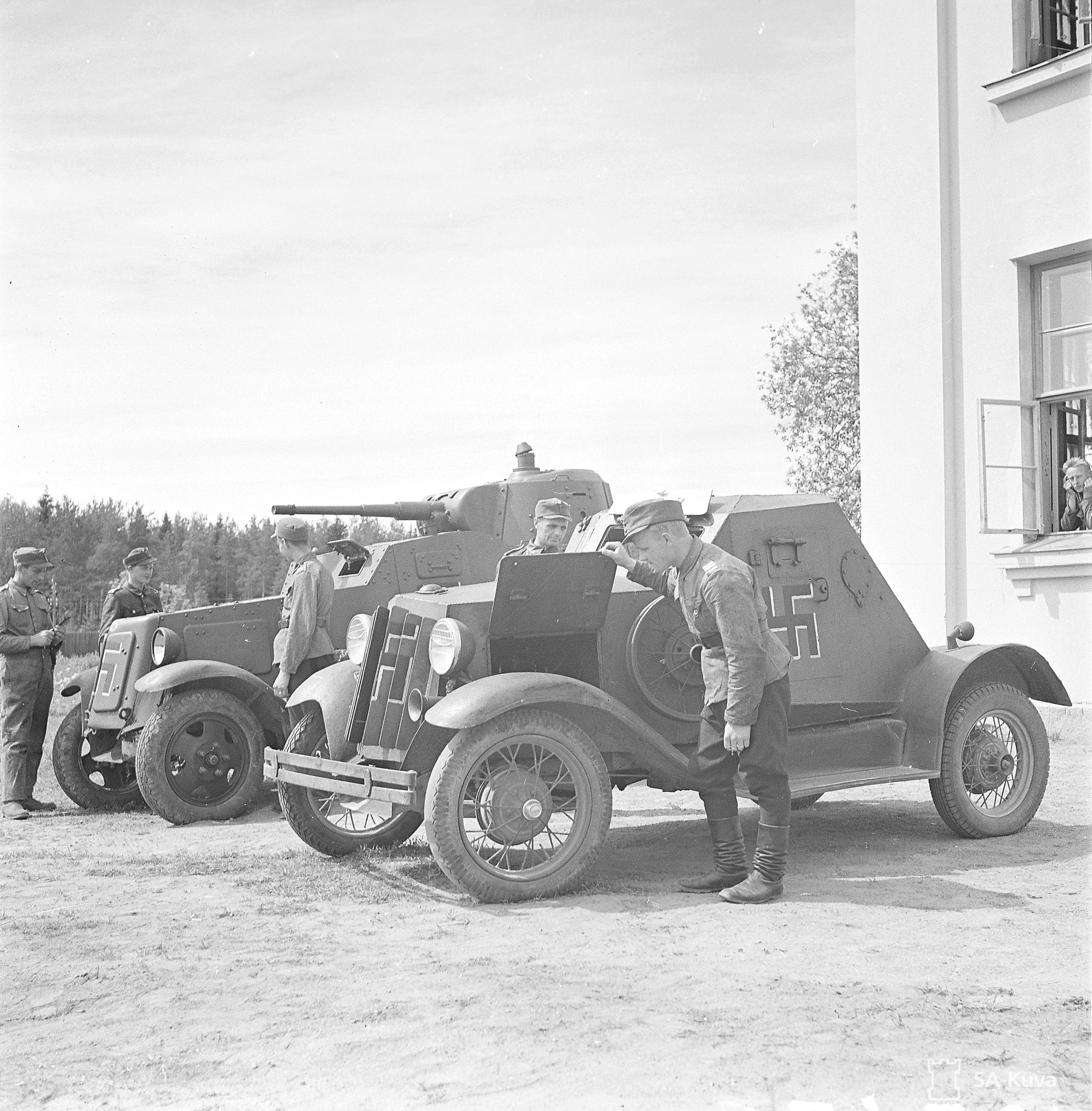
- D-8 armored car captured by the Finnish Army during the Winter War
- Type: Armored car
- Place of origin: Soviet Union

Service history
- In service: 1931-1940
- Used by: Soviet Union; Spanish Second Republic; Finland (captured)
- Wars: Spanish Civil War, Winter War

Production history
- Designer: N.I. Dyrenkov
- Manufacturer: Izhorskiye Factory
- No. built: 60 (27 D-8 and 33 D-12)

Specifications
- Mass: 1.58 tons
- Length: 3,540 mm (139 in)
- Width: 1,705 mm (67.1 in)
- Height: 1,680 mm (66 in)
- Crew: 2
- Armor: 3 mm (0.12 in) on roof, 6 mm (0.24 in) rear and sides 7 mm (0.28 in) front
- Main armament: 2 × 7.62 mm (0.300 in) DT machine guns
- Engine: GAZ-A petrol 40 hp (30 kW)
- Transmission: Mechanical
- Suspension: Spring hanger
- Ground clearance: 224 mm (8.8 in)
- Operational range: 225 km (140 mi)
- Maximum speed: 85 km/h (53 mph)

The D-8 (Dyrenkov-8) was an early Soviet armored vehicle built in 1932–1934. Only 60 were built; it was quickly superseded by the FAI armoured car. Both were assembled in the Izhorsky Factory near Leningrad.

The D-8 was first used by Republican forces in the Spanish Civil War. D-8s were delivered as part of the USSR’s military aid. The D-8 and D-12 light armored cars were primarily used in reconnaissance roles versus purely combat roles. One D-8 was captured and used by the Finnish Defense Force during the Winter War against the Red Army.

== Design ==
As a result of their extensive experience with armored cars during the civil war, the Soviets showed a great deal of interest in developing more modern versions during the 1930s. However, their initial efforts were slowed until the rejuvenation of the Russian automobile industry which began in the late 1920s. The Soviets saw the armored car as falling into two primary classes; light and heavy. This classification was based more on armament than on weight. Light armored cars were armed with machine guns while heavy armored cars were armed with 37 to 45 millimetres (1.5–1.8 in) anti-tank guns.

The earlier armored car designs, such as the BA-27, were based on truck chassis. Following the BA-27 project, the next projects were undertaken at the Izhorskiye Factory in Kolpino on the basis of newly imported Ford Model A automobiles, and their Soviet copies, the GAZ-As. The chassis for most armored cars of the 1930s were built by the KIM plant in Moscow and the Gorkiy plant in Nizhny Novgorod. The latter plant was originally known as the Nizhny Novgorod Automobile Plant (NAZ), but was renamed as the Gorkiy Automobile Plant (GAZ) in the mid-1930s. These chassis were shipped to the armored car manufacturers (primarily the Izhorskiy and the smaller but longer-established Vyksinskiy plant), where the armored bodies were mounted on the chassis and final assembly was undertaken. Prior to 1931, the imported Ford Timken chassis was used for some Soviet armored cars. While this chassis was available thereafter, the provision of series production technology to the USSR by Henry Ford in 1931-32 gave a major boost to Soviet armored car production. It provided readymade chassis for both light (Ford/GAZ-A and Ford/GAZ-AA-based) and heavy (GAZ-AAA-based) armored cars. ZiS was also later to provide 6×4 chassis for limited-production heavy armored cars.

The D-8 armored vehicle, designed in 1931 by N. I. Dyrenkov, was relatively light and had no turret. The design utilized a licensed passenger car Ford A chassis. Two machine guns were mounted in front and rear plates of vehicle, not providing a 360-degree coverage. Two more machine guns mounted on hull sides were supposed on prototype, but did not reach serial production due to making the D-8 extremely cramped inside. The D-8 had a two-man crew sitting back to back so that the rear man could fire a rear-mounted machine gun. The D-8 was quickly phased out of production in lieu of the heavier and better equipped FAI armoured car.

== D-12 ==
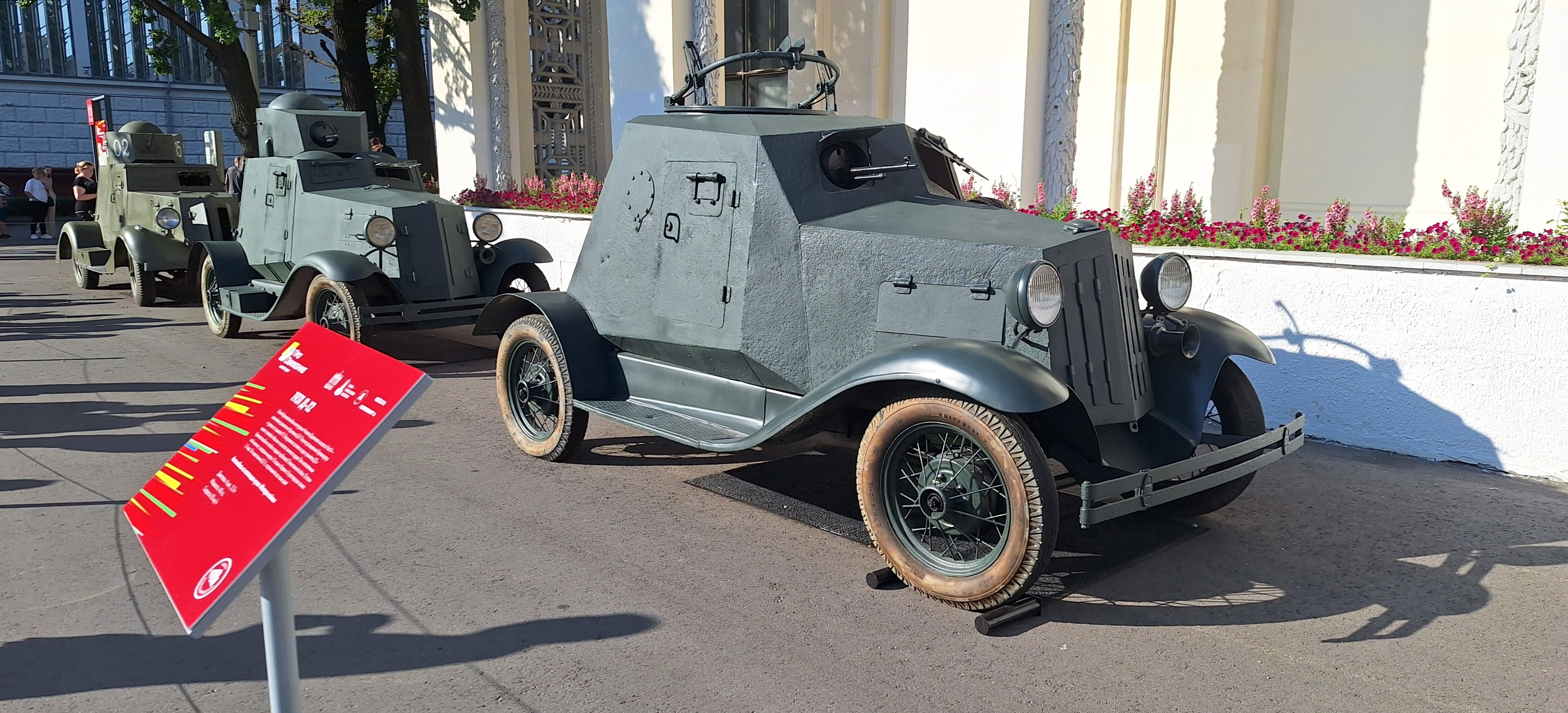
D-12 armored car at the auto festival in 2025.

The D-12 (Dyrenkov-12) was a Soviet light armored car based on the GAZ-A automobile. It was a further development of N.I. Dyrenkov's D-8 design. It was intended for infantry support and anti-aircraft roles. The fighting compartment had an open roof, where a 7.62 mm PM-1910 or DT anti-aircraft machine gun was ring mounted. A 7.62 mm DT machine gun was also mounted in the front right of the vehicle. The original prototype contained two more ball mounts for DT machine guns which were not included in the production versions since it was excessive armament for the crew and greatly reduced internal space.

The D-12 was produced alongside the D-8 at the Izhorskiy factory. It was 280 kg (620 lb) heavier than the D-8 but exhibited similar performance. Final testing took place in late 1931 together with the D-8. The D-12 was accepted into service with the Red Army and a small number were built at the Moscow Auto Zavod in 1932. The D-12 served during the early 1930s and was observed on Red Square during November 7 parades. Some vehicles remained in service during the war in 1941 and a few participated in the victory parade in Mongolia in 1945.
