= T-19 =

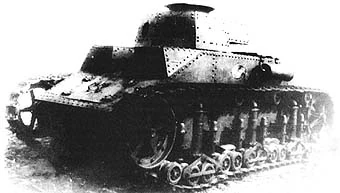
- T-19
- Type: Light tank
- Place of origin: Soviet Union

Production history
- Designer: Ginzburg
- Designed: 1929
- Produced: 1931
- No. built: Unknown

Specifications
- Mass: 7.20-8.10 tons
- Length: 4.50 m
- Width: 2.30 m
- Height: 2.18 m
- Crew: 3
- Main armament: 37 mm gun
- Secondary armament: 2 x DT machine gun
- Engine: petrol 100 hp
- Power/weight: 12.4 hp/t
- Suspension: vertical springs
- Operational range: 190 km
- Maximum speed: 27 km/h

The T-19 was a Soviet light tank design of the interwar years. Conceived as the mainstay of the new Soviet tank armies, it was a development of the T-18, ultimately based on the First World War-era French Renault FT. When ready for production in 1931, it was already obsolete; the project was terminated in favour of the Vickers based T-26.

== Technical requirements ==
The T-19 was to become the mainstay of the mobile subdivisions of the USSR. The main requirements for the T-19 were:

- The ability to overcome the majority of field fortifications and wire entanglements without the aid of a “tail” and at maximum speed
- firepower should ensure superiority on the battlefield over all known combat vehicles of similar mass
- armor should protect its crew from rifle and machine-gun bullets at all distances, and from the fire of 37 mm guns beyond 1000 meters

According to the technical specifications, the tank's mass should not be more than 7.3 tons, with its maximum speed reaching 30 km/h on good soil with a 100 hp engine, an armament of at least a 40 mm main gun and two machine guns. Armor was to be 18–20 mm thick. Production of the T-19 was assigned to Semyon Alexandrovich Ginzburg.

The suspension of the T-19 became that of the French Renault NC. The T-19 was longer than the T-18, which improved its performance without a “tail”, it also decreased any longitudinal vibrations in the hull.

=== Armor ===
Experts often state that sloped armored plate (for increasing the protection of the tank) was first used on the T-34. That is not the case. The fact is that the designers could not exceed the permissible mass of the T-19, therefore they used a maximum thickness of 16 mm of armor. The shape of the hull would be critical in terms of protection. Successful construction of the T-19 depended on sloped armor, such as that proposed to M. I. Tarshinovym (who was already occupied in KB KHPZ with the production of the T-12/T-24), by Ginzburg, which made it more likely for bullets and projectiles to ricochet rather than penetrate.

=== Armament ===
The main armament of the T-19 was the 1930 37 mm semi-automatic gun, along with two Degtyaryov machine guns (DT), one located in the frontal portion of the hull near the radio operator; the other was in the turret. The mounting of the armament in the turret was provided in two versions - an independent installation of gun and machine gun, and a coupled installation as a unit.

The turret was the same as the T-18. The cannon could not be mass-produced for a time, and by the time it could, it was used on the BT series of tanks. The planned domestic six-cylinder air-cooled engine with a power of 100 hp was not produced; and the installation of the larger high-speed motor “Franklin” (95 hp) required reprocessing the construction of the gearbox, onboard transfers and even housing (engine it was more on the overall sizes). The T-19 required ball bearings, which at that time were not produced domestically, and had to be bought abroad. Price varied with the installation of chemical warfare equipment, flotation devices and other accessories.

=== Self containment ===
The T-19 became the first tank specially designed for the conditions of chemical warfare. It was equipped with plenum ventilation producing 180 m3/h of filtered air, and capable of neutralizing phosgene, hydrocyanic acid, chloropicrin, carbon monoxide and toxic smokes during 3-X of hours. Beyond that point the crew could stop to replace filters, or alternatively carry out a combat mission in gas masks.

=== Maneuverability ===
The T-19 was provided with floatation equipment powered using pneumatic or "skeleton" floats, whose discharge could be produced without the output of crew from the machine. For the production were accepted the floating crafts of naval engineer B.S. Smirnov's system. There was initially the desire to equip tank with two detachable screws for propulsion through the water, but the T -19 was instead equipped with a special “water tractor”, which was created in 1931.

The T-19 did not have a “tail” and overcame entrenchments and narrow ditches to 2 meters due to the proper length. However, by the width 2,5 – 3 m two T -19 had to couple in the case of encounter with the antitank ditch, being lengthened doubly, for which in the front and rear extremities of machine it was provided for the installation of the special framework constructions (on the housing of tank there was on three openings in the nose and rear portions for the installation of the farms of cohesion).

For battlefield surveillance, the tank no longer used simple slots, known as “broneglaz”. Initially it was planned to use "stroboscopic" instruments of the type used on the tank made by E.Grote (TG), but bulletproof glass of the “Simplex- triplex” type, with easily removable cartridge clips, was used instead.

== Political decision ==
The decision of the Revolutionary Military Council session of July 17 to 18, 1929, placed before the defense industry a complex problem: to create a new military vehicle in a very short time- the “T-19 basic tracked tank”. GKB OAT was tasked with its design that autumn. The end-of-development date was January 15, 1930, but this proved to be optimistic. The numerous denunciations and complaints of the designers, and also the influence of the leaders of the RKKA (Workers' and Peasants' Red Army) heavily impeded the design process, and several partial prototypes were simply dismantled. In one of the complaints, an unknown “patriot” complained about the designer's desire to use "... helical gears in the transmission of the T-19 instead of spur-gear, which is the direct proof of their sabotage… “. These sorts of complaints came from the military, too; one of the commanders required that the basic tank would be equipped with "... elbow-shaped paws with the shafts through the walls to provide motion in snowy conditions and mountains… “. Nevertheless, despite the delays, inspection of the finished product took place on March 1, 1930.

=== Production ===
Production of the first T-19 began in June 1931, and toward the end of August tanks were being delivered. However, the characteristics of the tank proved to be those below those planned, the weight was above the specifications (7,6-8 t), and the production was extremely complex. When added to the fact that the six-ton vehicle purchased from Vickers was both quicker and cheaper to produce, the ultimate outcome was that in 1931 work on the T-19 was cancelled and production redirected to the former, redubbed the T-26. At the time of cancellation, two T-19s had been completed, as well as a housing from the welded and cast parts and a number of accessories.
