= BA-21 =

Soviet prototype armored car

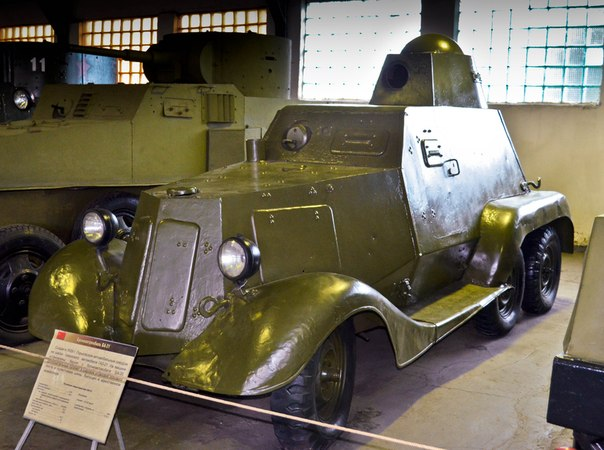
- A BA-21 at the Kubinka Tank Museum.
- Type: Armored car
- Place of origin: Soviet Union

Specifications
- Mass: 3.25 t (3.58 short tons)
- Length: 4.55 m (14 ft 11 in)
- Width: 1.78 m (5 ft 10 in)
- Height: 2.16 m (7 ft 1 in)
- Crew: 2 (commander, driver)
- Armor: 11 mm (0.43 in)
- Main armament: 7.62 mm (0.300 in) DT machine gun
- Engine: GAZ M1 water-cooled four-cylinder
- Maximum speed: 33 mph (53 km/h)

The BA-21 was an experimental Soviet armored car from 1938. It was a major modification of the BA-20, using a triaxial truck chassis instead of biaxial. The next year, the design was further developed into the LB-23, which had a better engine. Both vehicles were not accepted for production.

== Specifications ==
The BA-21 had a weight of 3.25 t (3.58 short tons), while having a length of 4.55 m (14 ft 11 in), a width of 1.78 m (5 ft 10 in), and a height of 2.16 m (7 ft 1 in). It was powered by a GAZ M1 water-cooled four-cylinder engine with a speed of 33 mph (53 km/h). It had 11 mm (0.43 in) of armor, with a 7.62 in (0.3 in) DT machine gun. The vehicle was manned by a crew of two, consisting of a commander and a driver.

== Development ==
The BA-21 was designed in 1938, as a major modification of the BA-20. It used a triaxial truck chassis, instead of a biaxial truck chassis. In 1939, the BA-21 was developed further into the LB-23, which had a better engine than the original design. Both of the vehicles were not accepted for production.
