= BT-SV =

BT-SV / BT-SW-2
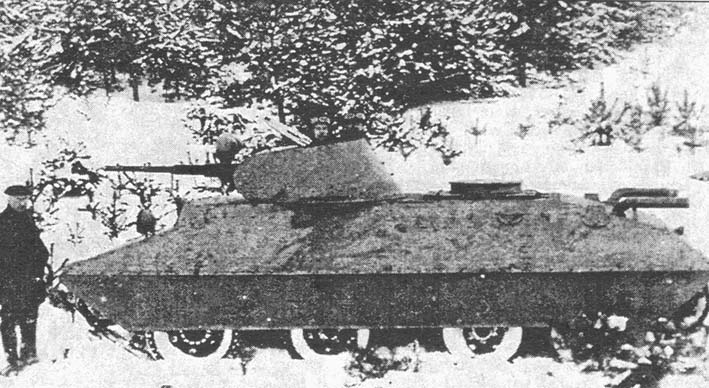
- BT-SV
- Type: Light cavalry tank
- Place of origin: Soviet Union

Production history
- Designer: Tsyganov Group
- Designed: 1937–1938

Specifications (BT-SV)
- Mass: 13.1 tons (25 tons for the production)
- Length: 562 cm
- Width: 280 cm
- Height: 217.5 cm
- Crew: 4
- Armour: 10-12 mm (16–25 mm for the production)
- Main armament: 45 mm 20KL tank gun
- Secondary armament: 7.62 mm DT MG
- Engine: Model M-17T; 400 hp
- Power/weight: 20 hp/tonne
- Suspension: Christie suspension
- Operational range: 120 km
- Maximum speed: 52 km/h (32.3 mph)

The BT-SV ( Bystrohodny Tank-Stalin Voroshilov) was an experimental Soviet light tank. In 1936, Soviet engineer Nikolai Tsyganov proposed a new high-speed light tank based on the BT-5. The design was to incorporate sloped armor similar to the T-34, which was also being developed at the time, and a transmission identical to that of the BT-5. The armor was angled at around 15°–58°. It could protect the tank from 45mm rounds. Only two prototypes were built, both of which saw field testing. The vehicle never saw mass production, due to the lead engineer Nikolai Fedorovich Tsyganov being arrested alongside many of the other engineers of the project during the Great Purge. The tank also shows concern on the reliability of the suspension and transmission, as the extra weight added a lot of stress on the mechanics.

== Description ==
The main difference of the BT-SV from the BT-7 was the design of the armored hull, the sheets of which were located at large angles of inclination (15° to 58°). The bow had the same width as the entire body. Thanks to this, the front pipe and brackets of the BT-7 tank were unnecessary. The suspension of the front road wheels were similar to the others, but with a spring tilted back at a 38° angle. The body of the BT-SV had no protruding parts at all, with the exception of the caps of the vertical suspension springs. All upper, lower and corner plates of the hull were removable and fastened with bolts. To give the armored closure of the chassis more rigidity, special jumpers (three on each side) were provided between the lower edge of the sheet and the inner wall of the hull. Fuel tanks were located in the sides of the tank. The BT-7 stern gas tank was eliminated; as a result, the tank stern was also assembled from inclined sheets. The engine cooling system, unlike the BT-7, operated in two modes: combat and travel. In the combat position, the blinds were hermetically closed from the driver's seat and air was taken through the mesh of the aft air pockets. In the stowed position, the air intake was carried out through the side opening louvers. After blowing off the engine, the heated air came out through the aft louvers. The BT-SV turret did not have a niche, so the radio station was moved to the bow of the hull, where the fourth crew member, the radio operator, was located. The BT-SV hull was made of ordinary steel sheets 10–12 mm thick. The real armor project existed in two versions. The first provided for the use of FD grade armor 40–55 mm thick, which protected from 45 mm shells at all distances; the second was designed to protect against bullets of 12.7 mm caliber and assumed the use of 20–25 mm armor of the IZ brand.
