= T-17 tank =

Soviet tankette

T-17
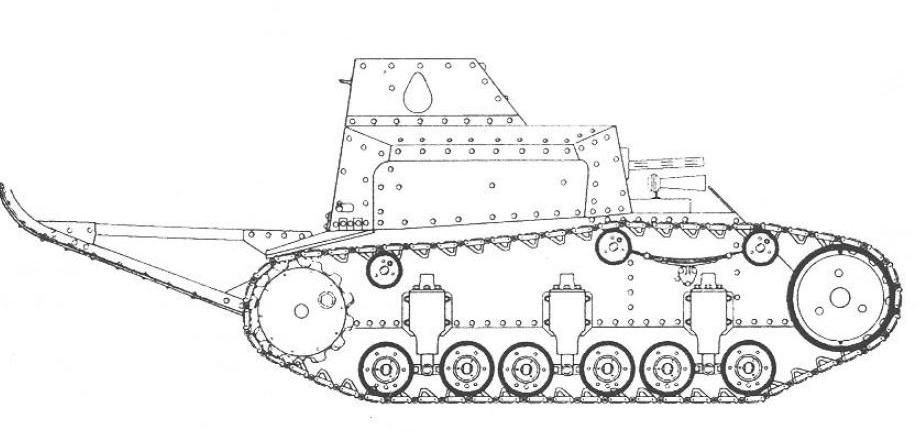
- Drawing of a T-17 tankette.
- Type: Tankette
- Place of origin: Soviet Union

Service history
- Used by: Soviet Union

Production history
- Designer: Ginzburg
- Produced: 1929
- No. built: 3

Specifications
- Mass: 2.4 tons
- Crew: 1
- Armor: 14–10 mm (0.55–0.39 in)
- Main armament: 1 7.62×54mmR machine gun
- Engine: 16 hp (12 kW)

The T-17 tank was a one-man "mechanized support" tankette designed and developed by the Soviet Union during the Interwar period.

== Development ==
In 1926, the design bureau КБ Orudiyno-Arsenalny Trest, OAT (later OKMO) began work on a "Liliput" single man light reconnaissance tank. The development team faced several problems, including finding a new chassis and engine. The project was stalled continuously. On March 3, 1928, under the leadership of the head motor lab, AP Kushka involving LY Lalmena, as well as engineers, Semyon Ginzburg and Edward Grote undertook the production of a new draft.

As part of a three-year plan to produce a force structure capable of conducting operational maneuver and infantry support, a mechanized and armored force was to be established by December 1930. In 1929 the Field Regulation (Polevoi Ustav), declared that future war would be one of maneuver, developing the theory of successive operations by injecting the idea of motorization and mechanization into concepts for future offensive operations. The Ustay enunciated the aim of conducting deep battle to achieve success in penetrating the tactical depth of enemy defenses.

In May 1930 the Soviets created their first mechanized support brigade, consisting of 60 tanks and 32 tankettes (tankettes were light tanks armed with heavy machine guns).

== Design ==
The T-17 developers utilized the T-16 chassis and powertrain for the base model. The hull was based on the "Liliput". The power unit used was a 16 hp two-cylinder air-cooled engine. The tracks were made out of rubber and steel.

The superstructure, which sat atop the chassis of the T-17 (often referred to as, like its predecessor, "Liliput"), was riveted to the frame. The driver, located in the hull, also operated a machine gun mounted to the right of the longitudinal axis.

== Testing ==
With long initial delays, a prototype was ready by the end of 1929. Despite problems, it was tested in January 1930. In June of that year, another test was conducted and showed better mobility than the T-18.

One of the biggest drawbacks in tanks of this era was track failure. Therefore, one of the three tankettes ordered by the summer of 1930, was tested in a different track configuration. This second version of the T-17 had Kégresse type rubber tracks. However, the design was considered impractical, and it was decided to continue work on the full metal track versions, continued with the later production units of the T-18.
