= Obiekt 490 =

Obiekt 490 (First design)
- Type: Main battle tank
- Place of origin: Soviet Union

Production history
- Designer: KMDB
- Designed: 1980s
- Manufacturer: Malyshev Factory
- Produced: 1981s

Specifications
- Mass: 41.5 metric tons
- Crew: 2
- Armor: Hull front: 100mm steel plate at 68° followed by 500mm composite Hull sides: 180mm composite Turret front: 780mm of composite armor at 30° Turret sides: 300mm Hull side skirts: 85mm
- Main armament: 125 mm cannon
- Secondary armament: Three machine guns

The Obiekt 490 "Poplar", or Object 490, was an experimental Soviet tank developed in the early 1980s. Two versions of the vehicle existed under the same project name, however the designs were radically different, with the second being one of the most unusual designs in the history of tank development. The vehicle was designed by Eugenie Morozov, who was the son of Alexander Alexandrovich Morozov. The project was cancelled in 1991 following the collapse of the USSR and Morozov's death.

== First design ==
The tank was designed by the Kharkov design bureau. It had several key design features. First, it was intended to have a crew of two people, who would be placed within a secure capsule. This would also reduce the tank's volume. Second, the tank would use hydropneumatic suspension, allowing for increased speeds by making the tank's movement smoother, while also allowing control over the tanks clearance, allowing it to change the angle of the hull. Third, the vehicle would be accompanied by a specialised loading and supply vehicle on the same chassis. This supply vehicle was intended to be able to rearm and refuel the tank without requiring the crew to leave the safety of the vehicle. This design had a three man crew. A variant of the vehicle was Object 490A, which had a radically redesigned turret and an additional crew member.

=== Armament ===
The tank was armed with a 125mm cannon (130mm guns were apparently proposed as well). The gun had an automatic loader with a fairly simple yet still efficient design. The tank was equipped with a coaxial machinegun and two machine guns for anti-aircraft, which were mounted along the rear sides of the turret. There were proposals for also equipping it with a light autocannon (23-30mm) yet nothing ever came of this. The tank's ammunition was isolated from the crew and blow-off panels on the turret to increase survivability in the event the ammunition compartment was breached. The gun's sensor system consisted of two panoramic visual sights as well as a separate panoramic thermal sight.

=== Protection ===
A key aspect of the vehicle's design when it came to defence was compartmentalisation, with the vehicle essentially composed of compartments that were separated from each other. The vehicle's two-man crew were placed in a capsule separated from the rest of the tank (both crewmen having a full set of controls). The fuel compartment was also separate and divided by several internal walls to reduce fuel loss in the event the fuel compartment was penetrated. The fuel tank was placed in front of the crew capsule to act as a form of protection for the crew. The tank was equipped with composite armour. The vehicle was also intended to be equipped with the "Standard" active protection system (consisting of six launchers, three per turret side). The tank's hydropneumatic suspension would also allow it to adjust its height and thus reduce its target profile and this suspension system was protected by screens.

=== Supply vehicle ===
One concern for the Soviets was supplying the vehicle with fuel and ammunition, as supply vehicles are much more vulnerable than the tanks they accompany. This was particularly concerning given the Cold War expectation that any clash between NATO and the Warsaw Pact would involve tactical nuclear weapons. The solution was to design a specialised supply vehicle on the same chassis. This "armoured refuelling and rearming vehicle" would replace the tank's turret with a cargo superstructure. The supply vehicle was fitted with docking devices to allow it to supply both fuel and ammunition to the tank and could theoretically fill one tank with fuel in 2 minutes and fully reload its ammunition in 5 minutes. Enough ammunition would be carried by the supply vehicle to reload up to five Object 490 tanks.

Object 490 (Second design)
- Type: Main battle tank
- Place of origin: Soviet Union

Production history
- Designer: KMDB
- Designed: 1980s-1991
- Manufacturer: Malyshev Factory

Specifications
- Mass: 54 metric tons
- Crew: 2
- Armor: Steel-reactive composite, measured in RHA equivalence Front plate to crew compartment: 2000-4500mm at 80° Hull front: APFSDS 700mm, cumulative ammunition (CE) 1000mm Upper hull: Explosively formed penetrators 180-200mm, CE 600mm Turret centre top: 50mm at 5° Hull bottom front: 20mm Hull bottom ammunition compartment: 50mm Hull bottom crew compartment: 100mm
- Main armament: 152 mm 2A73 cannon (32 rounds)
- Secondary armament: 30mm grenade launcher 2x 7.62mm TKB-666 machineguns
- Engine: 2x 4TD; 2000hp (combined)
- Transmission: Hydrostatic-mechanical
- Suspension: Hydropneumatic suspension
- Maximum speed: 90 km/h (56 mph) on road, 55 km/h (34 mph) offroad

== Second design ==
Following the development of the Object 477 "Molot" program, it was decided to completely redesign Object 490 and develop it in parallel with Object 477 (the Object 490A variant was abandoned). It would be equipped with the 152 mm 2A73 cannon and would be one of the most unusual designs in tank history.

The tank's layout was organised along dividing it into five separate compartments, with the arrangement of the compartments corresponding to how much damage losing each section would do to the tank's combat effectiveness (for example losing the fuel or engine has lesser impact on combat performance than losing the crew, so these were placed ahead of the crew). The first compartment consisted of the fuel tank, followed by the engines and turret in the middle (the turret was above the engine compartment). Behind these two compartments was the autoloader and ammunition, which is then followed by the crew compartment at the rear of the vehicle. While this layout was modified somewhat during the design process of the vehicle (for example, the final design was optimised to account for attacks from overhead munitions), the basic sequential layout remained the same.

The crew compartment was NBC protected and contained a water closet, air conditioning, climate control and instruments for cooking food, allowing the crew to remain comfortably within the confines the vehicle. The vehicle crew of two consisted of a driver and commander-gunner, who accessed the vehicle through two rear hatches.

=== Armament ===
The vehicle's primary armament was the 152 mm 2A73 cannon and it carried 32 one-piece shells, which were fed by an autoloading system. It had an angle of elevation of -5° to +10° and while the turret was capable of a full 360° rotation, the mounting of the gun on the sloped hull meant the barrel was only in line with the horizontal axis in a 45° frontal arc. However, this could be partially compensated for by the tank's hydropneumatic suspension which allowed it to change the angle of its hull. Due to the length of the autoloading compartment, the shells could be quite long at around 1400mm in length (for APFSDS shells, the shell's projectile was 1300mm long). Mounted on each of the rear sides of the cannon was a 7.62mm machinegun, each capable of independent targeting in the vertical axis at up to 45°, allowing them to hit targets up in buildings. Each machinegun carried 1500 rounds of ammunition.

To overcome the issue of attacks from other angles by infantry with handheld anti-tank weapons that the main gun would be unable to counter, a secondary turret was mounted on the rear of the vehicle, above the crew capsule. The secondary turret featured a 30 mm automatic grenade launcher that could aim 360° horizontally and -10° to +45° vertically.

The tank possessed a sophisticated sensor suite that was distributed across the vehicle. The main turret had an imaging module and laser range finding system on its right side, with a TV module and guidance system for ATGMs fired from the gun on its left side. A panoramic viewing sight was mounted on the secondary turret and the grenade launcher had its own day/night panoramic sight. A thermal sight was also mounted in the cannon's gun mantlet. The sights were stabilised with the cannon. All weapons were remotely operated by the crew from their capsule.

=== Protection ===
Object 490 was designed with crew survivability as a key aspect, as it was considered the most vital component of combat effectiveness. By placing the crew compartment behind all other components, any projectile would have to penetrate through the rest of the vehicle to impact and no projectile was in development that would be able to achieve such a level of penetration. The total level of protection from the frontal hull to the crew compartment was equivalent from between 2000 and 4500 mm of rolled homogeneous armour (RHA). Protection was also increased by separating the various compartments with numerous internal steel plates, most 20 mm in thickness, though the crew and ammunition compartments were separated by 50 mm of steel plate. The frontal hull used composite armour, including explosive reactive armour, at a constant 80° angle. The outer and central layers of the hull's protection were made of high hardness steels, while the inner layer used a more moderate steel, which was intended to reduce the risk of fragmentation if penetrated.

The frontal plate and fuel compartment was equivalent to 700-1000mm (depending on shell type used) of RHA. The fuel tank had several partitions to divide it up, meaning that damage to one section of the fuel tank would only lead to a partial loss of fuel and thus not a loss of combat performance. The autoloader also featured blow off panels on the bottom of the compartment. The tank's weakest point was the turret roof, which only had a protection of 50mm at 5°, however in the event this was penetrated, only one of the engines could be destroyed. The engine was also another layer of protection for the crew from shots to the front. On the hull bottom, protection ranged from 20mm under the fuel and engine compartments to 50mm under the ammunition and 100mm under the crew compartment.

Twelve "Tucha" smoke launchers were mounted on the sides of the turret, six per side. For protection against a variety of munitions from all angles as well as from above, the tank was equipped with twenty-six "Shtandart" active protection mortars. An escape hatch was also present in the bottom of the crew compartment.

=== Mobility ===
The vehicle was powered by two 4TD engines, with a combined total output of up to 2000 hp. Each engine had two power levels, a lower level at 800 hp and a higher at 1000 hp. The former was a low-consumption mode for simple travel and the latter was for combat. Using two engines allowed for two moderate power engines to produce a high combined output, reduced fuel costs by allowing the use of just a single engine and increased survivability by allowing the vehicle to still move if one engine was damaged. The tank could move at 75km/h in both forward and reverse speed and the transmission was capable of providing a maximum speed of up to 90 km/h when travelling on road and 55 km/h off-road.

The tank utilised two sets of tracks, a shorter front set of two road wheels and a longer rear set of four road wheels (in the initial proposal, both consisted of three road wheels). This meant the tank was capable of moving even if two tracks were destroyed, provided they were from opposite sides.

To assist with mobility, fixed front-facing cameras were installed on the front of the hull, as well as on the futon shelves. A rear view camera was also installed on the driver's hatch, along with a window. This was because it was expected that when not in combat, the vehicle would be driven in reverse (the driver's chair could swivel).
