= BA-27 =

Soviet armoured car

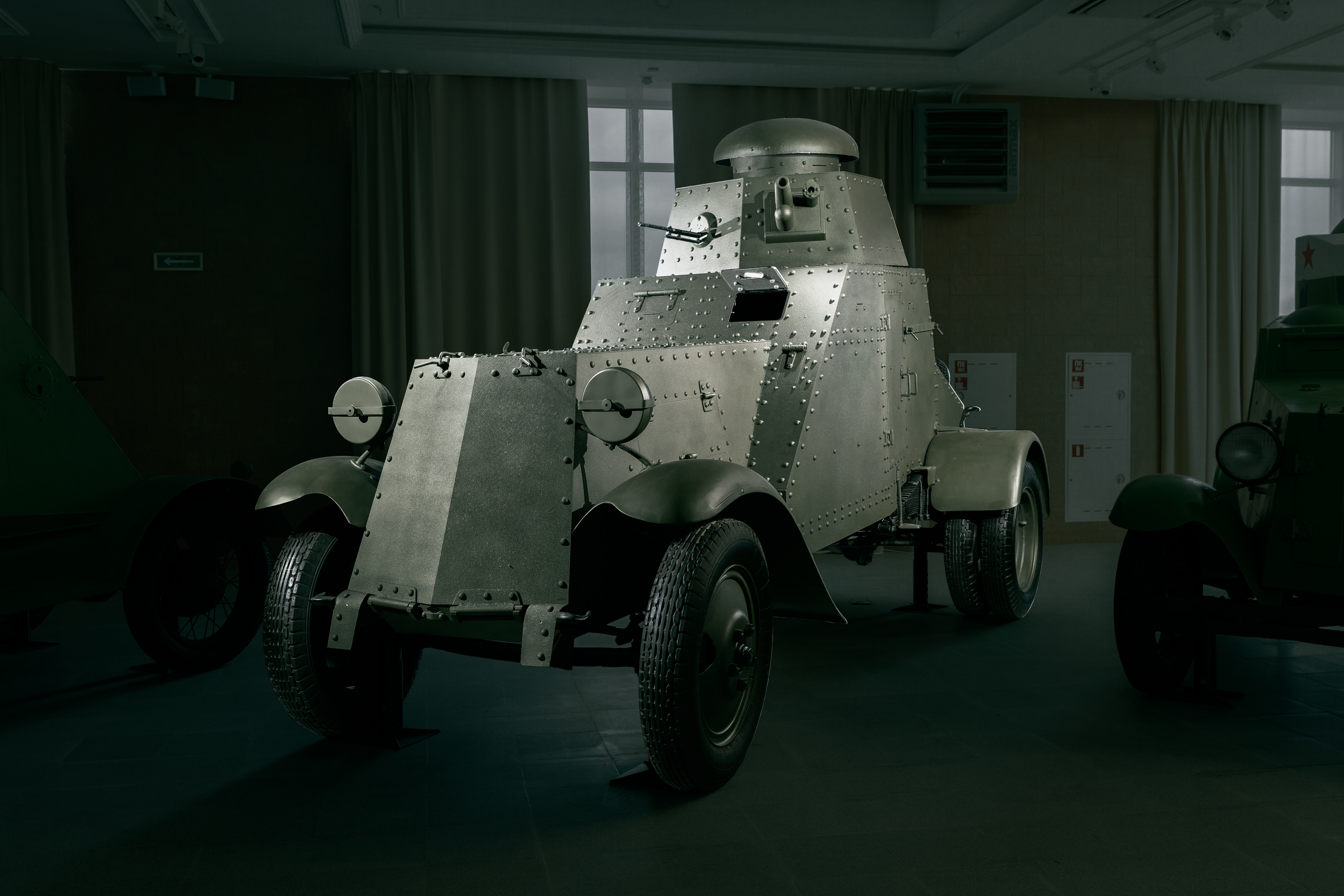
- Replica of BA-27 in the UMMC Museum Complex
- Type: Armoured car
- Place of origin: Soviet Union

Service history
- Used by: Soviet Union; Nazi Germany (captured)

Production history
- No. built: 215

Specifications
- Mass: 4.4 tonnes (4.9 short tons)
- Length: 4.62 m (15.2 ft)
- Width: 1.81 m (5.9 ft)
- Height: 2.52 m (8.3 ft)
- Crew: 4
- Armor: 7 mm
- Main armament: 37 mm Hotchkiss gun
- Secondary armament: 7.62 mm DT machine gun
- Engine: 4-cylinder gasoline AMO; 35 hp (26 kW)
- Power/weight: 8 hp/tonne
- Suspension: 4×4 wheeled
- Operational range: 350 km (220 miles)
- Maximum speed: 48 km/h (30 mph)

The BA-27 was a Soviet first series-produced armoured car, manufactured from 1928 to 1931, and used for scouting and infantry support duties early in the Second World War. The BA-27 was a heavy armoured car, having the same turret and armament as the first Soviet tank, T-18, manufactured at the same time: the main gun was a modified copy of the French 37 mm Puteaux SA 18 cannon, and it was supported by an additional machine gun.

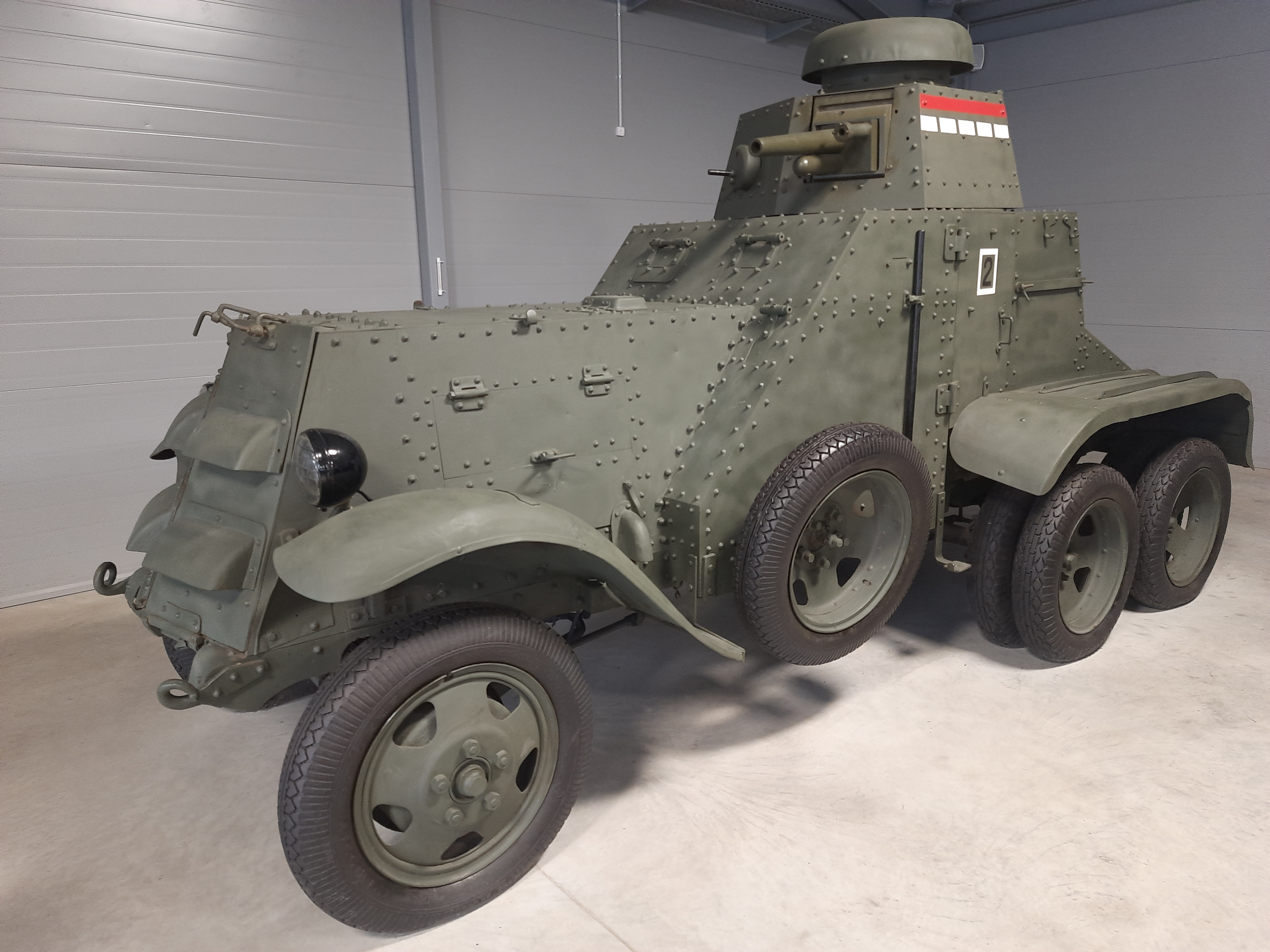
BA-27M in the Kubinka Tank Museum

The production of the first Soviet truck, AMO-F-15 truck (a copy of the Fiat 15), started in 1924. Using the chassis of this truck, the Izhorsky Factory design team developed BA-27 heavy armoured car in 1927. There was no significant production of AFVs in Russia since 1918, and the indigenous automobile industry was practically non-existent at the time. After lengthy trials, the new vehicle was accepted into Soviet Red Army service in 1929. Two hundred fifteen were built between 1928 and 1931. The last batch of BA-27 was mounted on Ford Model AA truck chassis. Both chassis were found to be inadequate to carry the heavy armour, and around 20 were later rebuilt on heavier, three-axle Ford-Timken truck chassis at Repair Base No. 2 (Rembaz No. 2), bearing designation BA-27M.

193 of BA-27 and BA-27M still remained in service on 1 June 1941, just before the German invasion of the Soviet Union. During the early stages of the war, several units were captured by Germans and pressed into their own service.
