= Obiekt 490A =

- Type: Main battle tank
- Place of origin: Soviet Union

Production history
- Designer: KMDB
- Designed: 1981–1982
- Manufacturer: Malyshev Factory
- Produced: 1981–1984
- No. built: 2

Specifications
- Mass: 48 metric tons
- Crew: 3 (Driver, commander, gunner)
- Armor: Hull front: 50mm steel plate followed by 750mm of composite armor at 50° Hull sides: 220mm Hull roof: 300mm Turret front: 50mm steel plate followed by 750mm of composite armor at 80° Turret sides: 500mm Turret roof: 400mm Crew hatches: 220mm
- Main armament: 125 mm 2A66 cannon (34 rounds, 14 RPM)
- Secondary armament: 7.62mm KT-7.62; 12.7mm KT-12.7 RWS
- Engine: KMDB 6TD-3 6-cylinder diesel 1500HP
- Transmission: Hydraulic drive system
- Fuel capacity: 1290 liters
- Maximum speed: 75 km/h (47 mph) on road, 55 km/h (34 mph) offroad

The Obiekt 490A "Rebel" (Russian: Объект 490А Бунтарь), or Object 490A, was a Soviet experimental main battle tank developed between 1981 and 1982. Only two prototypes were ever produced, neither of which was capable of firing due to time constraints. Neither of the vehicles was completed before their production was ceased.

== Design ==
Object 490A was created as an alternative variant for the Object 490. The 490A Buntar was suggested to provide the vehicle with one more crew member as well as an externally mounted gun. The biggest change from the Object 490 to the 490A was the completely redesigned turret as well as minor changes to the chassis. The project was cancelled at the end of 1984 due to the newer Object 477 Molot program beginning. The tank is considered a vehicle ahead of its time, as it utilized multiple new technologies to stay ahead of the competition.

=== Armor ===
The armor consisted of a layer of steel followed by composite armor, which consisted of five layers of steel separated by four layers of ceramic. The roof armor was unusually high on the hull as well as the turret in order to prevent the vehicle from being damaged by artillery. The vehicle's fuel tank was located to the right of the driver and acted as extra armor.

Ammunition was stored in a compartment situated in the right side of the turret and the commander was situated right beside it. The gunner seat was placed in front of the commander. This fighting compartment was completely isolated from the rest of the tank, including from the driver who was to be situated in the front.

Reactive armor (presumably Kontakt-5) was designed to be implemented to the front of the tank as well as the sides, but the production was cancelled before the vehicle reached that stage.

=== Armament ===
The vehicle sported a fire-control system (designated as "Argus"). Argus was the main computer to which the radar, thermal imager and cameras were linked to. The gun was mounted externally rather than inside an armoured turret, giving the tank a lower profile. The creators of the vehicle, Bazhenov and Shomin, debated over what caliber of gun should replace the previously planned 125mm 2A66M smoothbore. A 130 mm was suggested, but a 152 mm 2A73 gun would instead be the gun implemented on future models.

=== Mobility ===
The 5TDF engine manufactured in the Malyshev Factory was used as a temporary placeholder and would be changed out for the 1500 horsepower KMDB 6TD-3 6-cylinder diesel engine. Paired with a hydraulic drive system and 580 mm wide tracks, the tank had good mobility for its weight. The tank had an approximate 31 hp/t power-to-weight ratio, allowing the vehicle to travel at 75km/h on roads and 55km/h off-road.
