= Obiekt 277 =

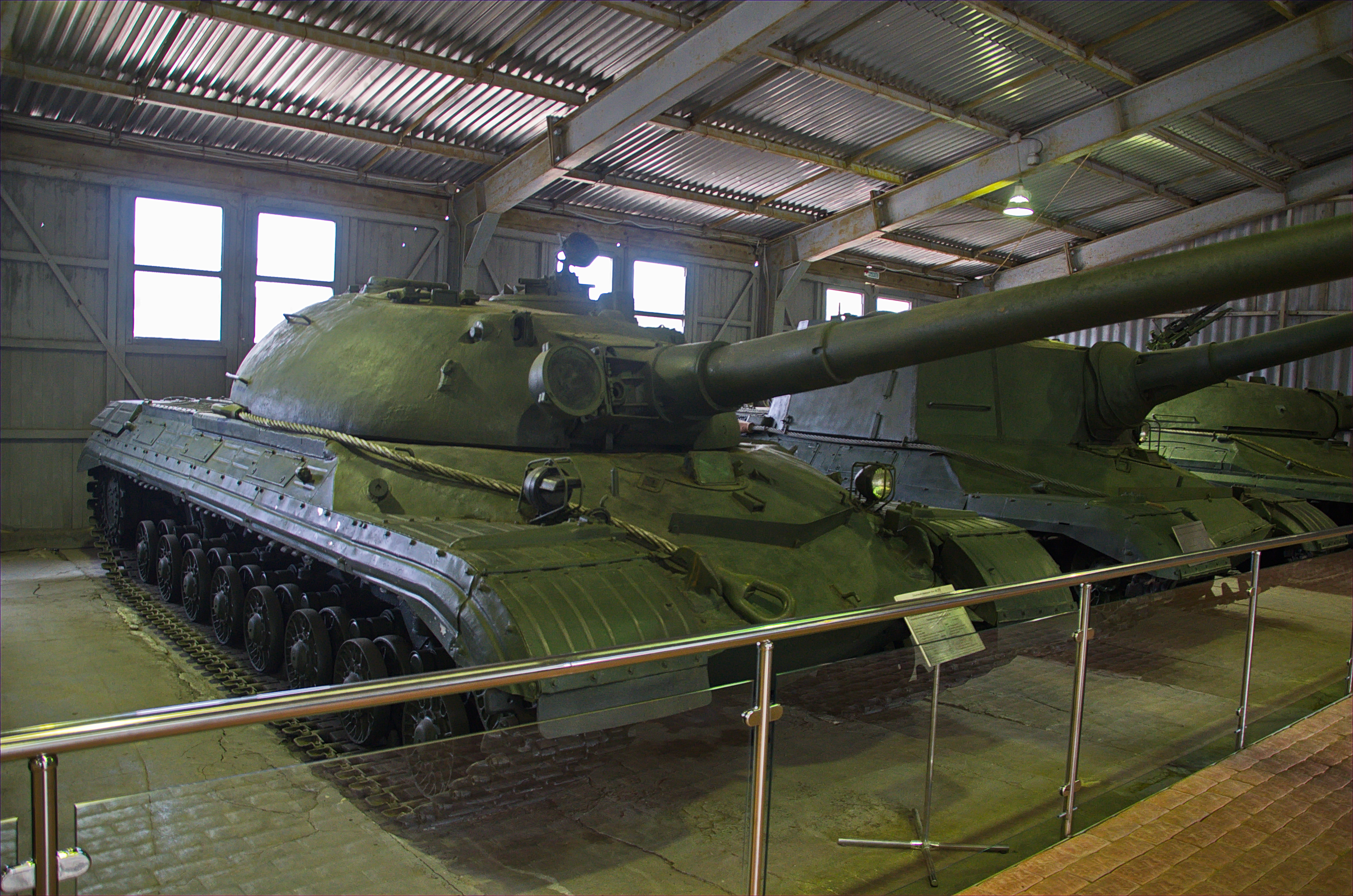
- Obiekt 277 on display at the Kubinka Tank Museum
- Type: Heavy tank
- Place of origin: Soviet Union

Production history
- Designed: 1957
- No. built: 2
- Variants: 1, Obiekt 278

Specifications
- Mass: 55 tons
- Length: 1178cm (total), 699cm (hull)
- Width: 338cm
- Height: 229,2cm
- Crew: 4 (commander, loader, gunner, driver)
- Armor: Frontal turret: 290mm RHA; Upper glacis: 140mm RHA; Lower glacis: 138mm RHA; Sides: 112mm RHA; Rear turret: 50mm RHA
- Main armament: 130mm M-65 (37 rounds)
- Secondary armament: 14.5mm KPVT machine gun (800 rounds)
- Engine: M-850 12-cylinder diesel 1090hp
- Power/weight: 19.82 hp/ton
- Maximum speed: 55km/h

The Obiekt 277 (Russian: Объект 277) was a prototype Soviet heavy tank designed in 1957, one of the last heavy tanks to be produced by the USSR. Developed alongside its sister design, the Obiekt 278, as well as the Obiekt 279 and the Obiekt 770, Obiekt 277 was a conventional heavy tank, armed with a powerful gun and was thickly armoured. All development was cancelled in 1960, as part of Nikita Khrushchev's wish to abandon what he deemed obsolete heavy tanks, and re-focus efforts on ATGMs.

== History ==
In 1956, the GBTU (main armour directorate of the USSR) laid out the tactical and technical requirements for a new heavy tank. 3 projects would eventually emerge from this decree: the Obiekt 277, 279 and 770. Obiekt 277 and 279 were developed at OKBT (LKZ), the Leningrad Special-purpose Design Bureau (SKB), and Obiekt 770 at Chelyabinsk Tractor Plant. Despite having wildly different designs, the 3 vehicles were to share the 130mm M-65. Obiekt 279's development was headed by L.S. Troyanov, Obiekt 770's by Pavel Isakov, and Obiekt 277's by Josef Kotin.

== Development ==
Development of the Obiekt 277 began in 1956. From the beginning, there were to be two vehicles: Obiekt 277 and Obiekt 278, different in design. However, the two design groups led by N.F. Shashmurin and N.M. Chistyakov decided to unify the layout of their designs, instead varying only in the engine. In December 1958, the first prototype of the Obiekt 277 was manufactured, and sent to testing. The second prototype was also produced during this time, and both were tested from January 7, 1959, until February 26, 1960. A separate turret and hull were also produced for firing tests.

Testing revealed the Obiekt 277 was inferior to the Obiekt 770. Subsequently, work on the 277 was cancelled following the Decree of the Council of Ministers of the USSR on July 19, 1960. 3 days later, on July 22, 1960, Khrushchev forbade the further development of any tanks with a weight of over 37 tons. This halted the development of all 3 of the vehicles and, with a new focus on MBTs and ATGMs, consigned heavy tanks to history.

== Design ==
The Obiekt 277 was a standard heavy tank design. The hull was based on the T-10M, but elongated and more curved. The 277 carried the 130mm M-65 cannon. The gun was stabilised with the "Groza" system and was attached to a TPDS stereoscopic rangefinder sight. The gun was loaded with the help of an assisted loading mechanism, as the shells were too heavy to be safely and quickly loaded solely by manpower (30.7 kg). The 30.7 kg armour-piercing ammunition could be fired at 1050 m/s, and penetrated 280mm of vertical steel at 1000m. APDS ammunition (8.7 kg in weight) could be fired at 1800 m/s, and penetrated 350mm of vertical steel at 1000m. The cannon could elevate and depress to +16° and -5° respectively.

The Obiekt 277 had impressive armour characteristics: the cast turret varied from 290mm to 139mm, at angles from 30° to 55° from the vertical. The hull was around 140mm thick, and the sloped sides around 112mm. During testing, the armour withstood close-range shots from the 122mm D-25T. The vehicle was also equipped with an anti-nuclear protection system and thermal smoke equipment.

The engine used was the M-850 diesel engine, an upgraded version of the B-2 diesel engine, producing a horsepower of 1090. Despite the tank's weight of 55 tons, the engine and transmission could propel the vehicle to a maximum speed of 55 km/h.

== Variants ==
Obiekt 278: During development, a separate vehicle was designed with a new engine in mind. The Obiekt 278 was in all other ways identical to the Obiekt 277, but housed the experimental GTD-1 gas turbine engine, as well as a planetary gearbox. The vehicle never left the blueprint stage, and development was cancelled on July 19, 1960, along with the Obiekt 277.
