= Obiekt 770 =

Object 770
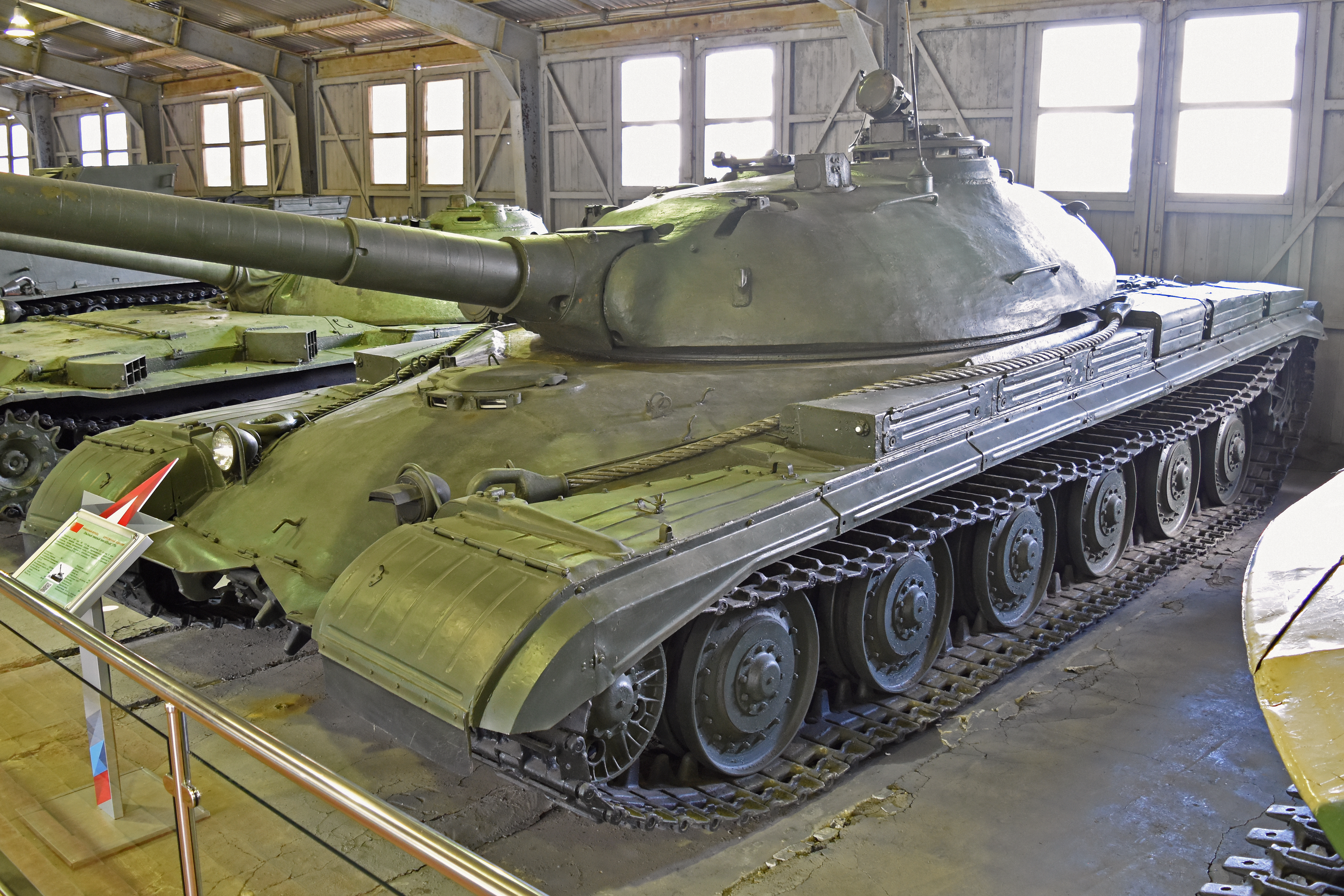
- Object 770 on display at the Kubinka Tank Museum
- Type: Heavy tank
- Place of origin: Soviet Union

Production history
- Designer: Pavel Isakov
- Designed: 1955
- Produced: 1957
- No. built: 1

Specifications
- Mass: 55.0 t (121,300 lb)
- Length: 10.15 m (33 ft 4 in)
- Width: 3.38 m (11 ft 1 in)
- Height: 2.42 m (7 ft 11 in)
- Crew: 4
- Armor: Frontal turret: 300mm RHA; Upper glacis: 120mm RHA; Lower glacis: 187mm RHA; Upper sides: 86mm RHA; Lower sides: 105mm RHA
- Main armament: 130mm M-65 (37 rounds)
- Secondary armament: 14.5mm KPVT machine gun (250 rounds)
- Engine: 10-cylinder, four-stroke, DST-10 diesel engine with a supercharging compressor 1000 hp
- Operational range: 200km on highway
- Maximum speed: 55 km/h (34 mph)

The Object 770 (Объект 770), was a prototype Soviet heavy tank designed in 1956, and was one of the last heavy tanks ever produced. It was developed alongside the Object 277 and the Object 279 following the Decree of the Council of Ministers of the USSR on August 12, 1955. Development was cancelled in 1960 following Nikita Khrushchev's orders to stop production of all heavy tanks weighing over 37 tons.

== History ==
In 1956, the GBTU (main armour directorate of the USSR) laid out the tactical and technical requirements for a new heavy tank. 3 projects would eventually emerge from this decree: the Object 277, 279 and 770. Object 277 and 279 were developed at OKBT (LKZ), the Leningrad Special-purpose Design Bureau (SKB), and Object 770 was developed at Chelyabinsk Tractor Plant. Despite having much different designs, the 3 vehicles were to share the 130mm M-65. Object 277's development was headed by Josef Kotin, Object 279's by L.S. Troyanov and Object 770's by Pavel Isakov.

== Development ==
Development began at Chelyabinsk in 1956, led by P. Isakov. From the get-go, the Object 770 was intended to be designed from scratch and implement numerous advanced technologies. Therefore, in 1957 a T-10M was sent to the plant to test various components. It was re-equipped with a V-12 engine boosted to 985 hp, as well as hydropneumatic suspension, hydromechanical transmission, control drives, final drives and tracks.

One prototype was produced in 1959 and sent to testing along with the Object 277. It proved superior to the 277 in almost all aspects, but never entered field trials due to dangerous torsional vibrations in the engine. This delayed development, which was subsequently cancelled following Khruschev's orders.

== Design ==
The Object 770 had a fully cast design, with a dome-shaped 3 man turret (and a driver in the hull). Unlike the 277 which had been based on the T-10, the 770 was completely new. However, like its cousins, the 770 carried the 130mm M-65 cannon. This was loaded with the help of an assisted loading mechanism, as the shells were too heavy to be safely and quickly loaded solely by manpower (30.7 kg), achieving a rate of fire of 5-7 rounds per minute. The 30.7 kg armour-piercing ammunition could be fired at 1050 m/s, and penetrate 280mm of vertical steel at 1000m. APDS ammunition (8.7 kg in weight) could be fired at 1800 m/s, and penetrate 350mm of vertical steel at 1000m. The cannon could elevate and depress to +16° and -5° respectively. The gun was fully stabilised with the "Groza" system.

The Object 770 also incorporated NBC protection, an automatic fire-fighting system, thermal smoke equipment and night vision devices into its design. The vehicle had hydropneumatic suspension for crew comfort and better accuracy. The tank was powered by a 10-cylinder, four-stroke, DST-10 experimental diesel engine that reached 1000 hp, allowing the tank to cruise at 55 km/h.

The tank was also very thickly armoured. The cast turret varied from 184mm to 260mm at angles from 30° to 50° from the vertical, translating to 263mm-300mm of effective armour. The upper hull varied from 85-138mm from 60 to 71° from the vertical, equalling 261-276mm of effective protection.
