= T-18 tank =

Soviet light tank

MS-1 light tank
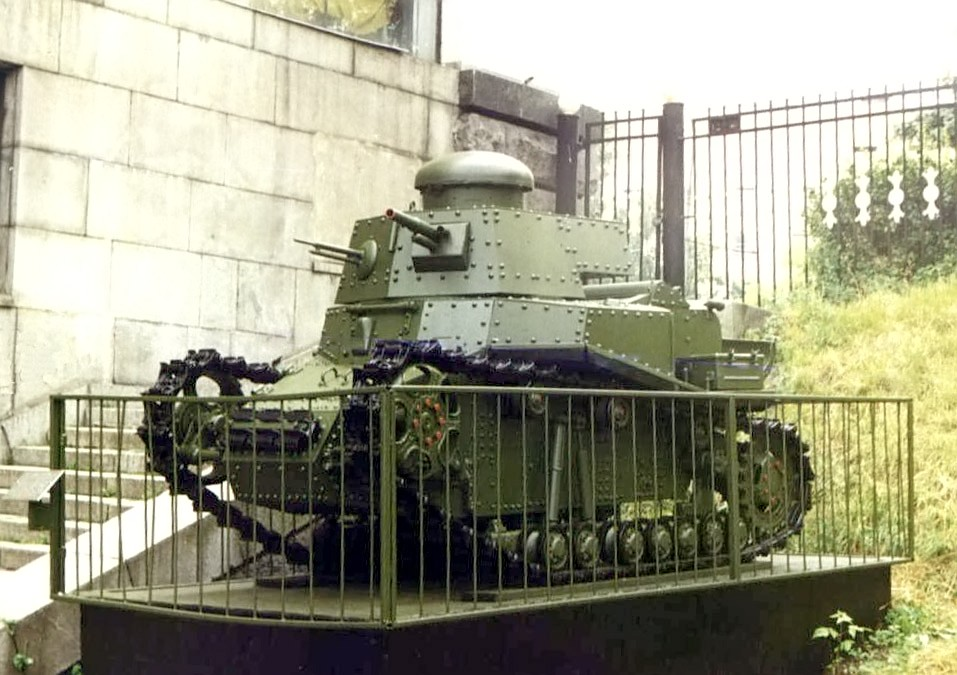
- MS-1 at the Moscow museum of Armed Forces
- Type: Light tank
- Place of origin: Soviet Union

Service history
- Used by: Soviet Union
- Wars: Sino-Soviet conflict

Production history
- Produced: 1928–1931
- No. built: ~960 by the end of 1931

Specifications
- Mass: 5.9 tonnes
- Length: 4.38 m (14 ft 4 in)
- Width: 1.76 m (5 ft 9 in)
- Height: 2.10 m (6 ft 11 in)
- Crew: 2
- Armor: 6-16 mm
- Main armament: 37mm Model 28
- Secondary armament: 2 Fedorov Avtomat Automatic rifles
- Engine: T-18; 35 hp (26 kW)
- Power/weight: 5.9 hp/tonne
- Suspension: vertically sprung
- Operational range: 50 km (31 mi)
- Maximum speed: 17 km/h (10 mph)

The T-18 light tank (also called MS-1, Russian: малый сопровождения, первый, romanized: maliy soprovozhdeniya, pearviy, "Small [Vehicle for] Support, First [type/example]") was the first Soviet-designed tank. Produced from 1928 to 1931, it was based on the Renault FT, with the addition of a vertically sprung suspension.

The T-18 and its derivatives were essentially unsuccessful designs, but they gave Soviet industry its first experiences in designing armoured vehicles, and in the meantime a number of foreign tank designs were available for production.

== Development ==
A T-18 in Khabarovsk participating in rehearsal for a Victory Day parade on May 7 2015

A "Tank Bureau" was formed in May 1924 for the development of Soviet tanks. A specification was issued for a 3-tonne two-man light tank capable of 7.5 mph (12.1 km/h). It would be protected by 16 mm of armour and equipped with a 37 mm (1.5 in) gun. By 1925 the allowable weight had increased to 5 tonnes.

The tank was designed by Professor V. Zaslavsky at a new Tank Bureau set up under the Central Directorate of Military Industries. The 35-horsepower truck engine (a copy of the Italian FIAT 15 ter) was supplied by the Moscow AMO Factory, and the gun was a modified copy of the French 37 mm Puteaux SA 18 cannon. The sprung suspension which would allow a tank to travel faster over rough ground was the biggest improvement over the Renault. A prototype called the T-16 was tested in June 1926.

The T-16 was deemed a failure, as it had problems with its transmission failing too often and its inability to cross trenches more than 1.5 m wide. The T-16's maneuverability was only marginally better than that of the Renault. Meanwhile, the КБ ОАТ drew up plans for an improved version of the T-16 which was accepted for production in July as the T-18, with the tank additionally noted as an MS-1 ("Support vehicle, small, type 1").

The T-18's chassis and suspension was improved from the T-16 by the addition of an extra support roller and an independent vertical spring suspension. The 300 mm track of the T-16 was transferred over to the T-18, with some improvements. The engine, a vertical, four-cylinder MS engine, was designed by engineer Liliya Palmen adapting an aircraft engine by Alexander Mikulin. The engine was capable of a maximum of 35 horsepower. The MS engine was combined with the PSC transmission in one unit rather than being in two separate housings. The PSC transmission gave the tank four forward speeds and one reverse speed. The engine-transmission compartment in the back let air in via holes drilled in the rear plate. This improved protection, but also led to the engine overheating. Electrical equipment included a 6-volt battery, magneto and dynamo, which fed the lamp, horn, rear light, light distribution panel and two portable lamps.

Armor for the T-18 consisted of six 8 mm curved plates for the turret (covered with a mushroom-style cap of 3 mm thickness), 16 mm plates for the hull, and the bottom plates were 3 mm thick. An emergency exit was installed in the underside. A small circular or rectangle hatch was placed in the turret for ventilation.

The T-18s armament stayed the same as that found on the Renault FT and T-16, the French 37 mm Model 28, mounted in a Hotchkiss-system mantlet. This gave the gun a range movement of 35 degrees horizontal, and +30 to -8 degrees vertical. This was coupled by a simple system of diopter sights. The 37 mm Model 28 was nearly obsolete by this time. That, coupled with a lack of optical sights, gave the T-18 little chance of taking out larger, better armoured opponents. However, with its 10–12 rounds per minute rate of fire and with the use of shrapnel projectiles it proved capable of combating infantry and soft vehicles. A double-barrelled 6.5 mm Fyodorov machine gun was mounted in a ball mount. Total ammunition carried was 104 37 mm shells and 2,016 6.5 mm cartridges. In later models the Fyodorov was replaced by the 7.62 mm DT machine-gun.

Demonstration of the T-18 took place in mid-May 1927, but in combat tests its ability to move over rough terrain and fight effectively were not immediately apparent. A special commission comprising representatives of the Supreme Economic Council Mobupravleniya, OAT factory "Bolshevik", Artupravleniya, and the headquarters of the Red Army were on hand for the tests. During trials to overcome obstacles the T-18 behaved no better than the FT, with its biggest problem being trenches or ditches wider than 2 m and deeper than approximately 1.2 m. The machines often became stuck trying to cross these obstacles and needed to be pulled out by a tractor or another tank. However, the T-18 proved to be more "nimble" than the FT or T-16 and had a maximum road speed of 18 km/h. In addition, in comparison with foreign analogues, the T-18 had better armour and a little more room for ammunition reserves.

Despite its problems, the T-18 was an improvement over the FT and T-16, so 108 tanks were ordered into production starting in February 1928. Production took place at the Leningrad Obukhov Factory (later renamed Bolshevik Factory). The first batch of 30 tanks were found to have serious technical problems. After several interruptions, and the inclusion of the Motovilikhinsky Machine-Building Plant (Former Perm Artillery) to increase production the two plants were able to deliver 96 of the promised 133 tanks in 1929.

Another round of trials was completed in Moscow to address the T-18's inability to cross 2-m-wide ditches. To solve this problem, a "tail" was added to the front. The tank could now overcome widths of 1.8 m, but it hindered the visibility of the driver and was thus abandoned. An improved T-18 with a better 40-horsepower engine, improved suspension and added turret bustle proceeded from 1929 to 1931, with a total of 960 tanks built. Plans were made to replace the main gun with new 37 mm B-3s but were never implemented.

A number of experimental designs based on the T-16 and T-18 were tested at the Bolshevik Factory, leading to the T-19 tank with a 90 hp engine in 1931, and the T-20 with a 60 hp engine. The new T2K Tank Design Bureau (later renamed Morozov Design Bureau) at the Kharkov Locomotive Factory used the T-18 as the basis for the new T-24 tank.

== Operational history ==
The T-18/MS-1 allowed for field experimentation and provided a testbed for further development.

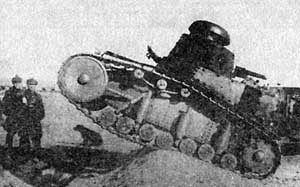
Soviet T-18 on the Manchurian Chinese Eastern Railway. 1929

Service in the forces of the first Soviet tanks did not leave behind a large number of clear combat examples. An experimental company equipped with T-18s took part in defending the Far Eastern Railway against Manchurian forces in 1929. They were removed from service in 1932 and given over to training. Following the German invasion of the Soviet Union a number of MS-1s were given 45 mm (1.8 in) guns with T-26/BT-5 gun mounts and entered service. Contrary to popular belief, tanks with 45 mm guns were never called T-18M; the T-18M was a 1938 prototype with simpler cupola, different drive sprocket, GAZ-M1 50 hp engine and removed rear bustle, which never reached production.

== Variants ==
SU-18 Self Propelled Gun.

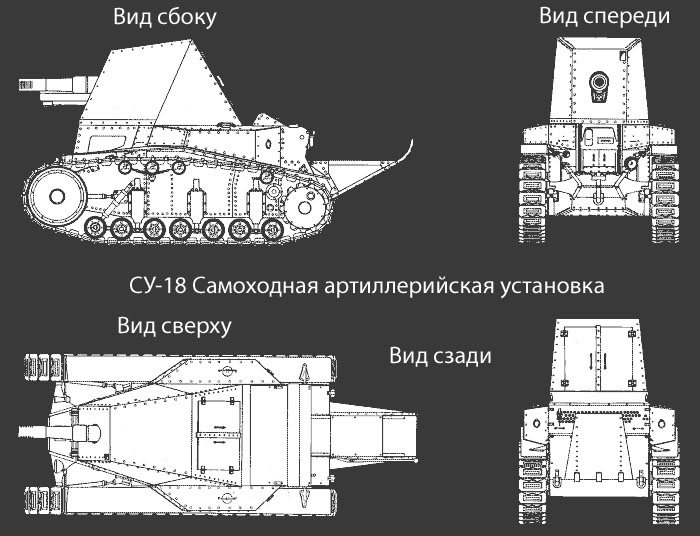

In November 1929 ANII K. M. Ivanov, commissioned by the UMM RKKA produced a self-propelled gun based on the T-18, as well as the ammunition carrier for it. The prototype was a captured French Renault FT 75BS. The SU-18 kept the same design as the French vehicle, but replaced the turret with one that resembles a truncated pyramid. The SU-18 used the 76.2-mm regimental gun model 1927 with a slotted muzzle brake to reduce rollback. It had an ammunition capacity of 4-6 rounds and no machine guns. Other prototypes were created using a high power 37-mm PC-2 gun and a 45-mm model 1930 tank gun, which was planned to be installed on T-24 tanks. Armor consisted of 5–7 mm thick plates. The ammunition carrier could hold 10 trays with 50 rounds each of 76.2 mm shells, or 16 trays of 169 shells each 37mm or 45mm guns. The crew consisted of one driver and one gunner. The decision to build the SU-18 was made on June 11 and stipulated the delivery of a prototype by October 10, 1930. However, due to the small ammunition capability and the limitations of the T-18 (a narrow gauge chassis and a high center of gravity) the design was abandoned in favor of larger and better self-propelled gun designs and further work on the SU-18 was stopped.

== See also ==
- T-17 tank
