= Kubinka Tank Museum =

Military museum in Moscow Oblast, Russia

- Военно-Исторический музей Бронетанкового Вооружения и Техники
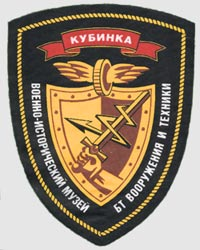

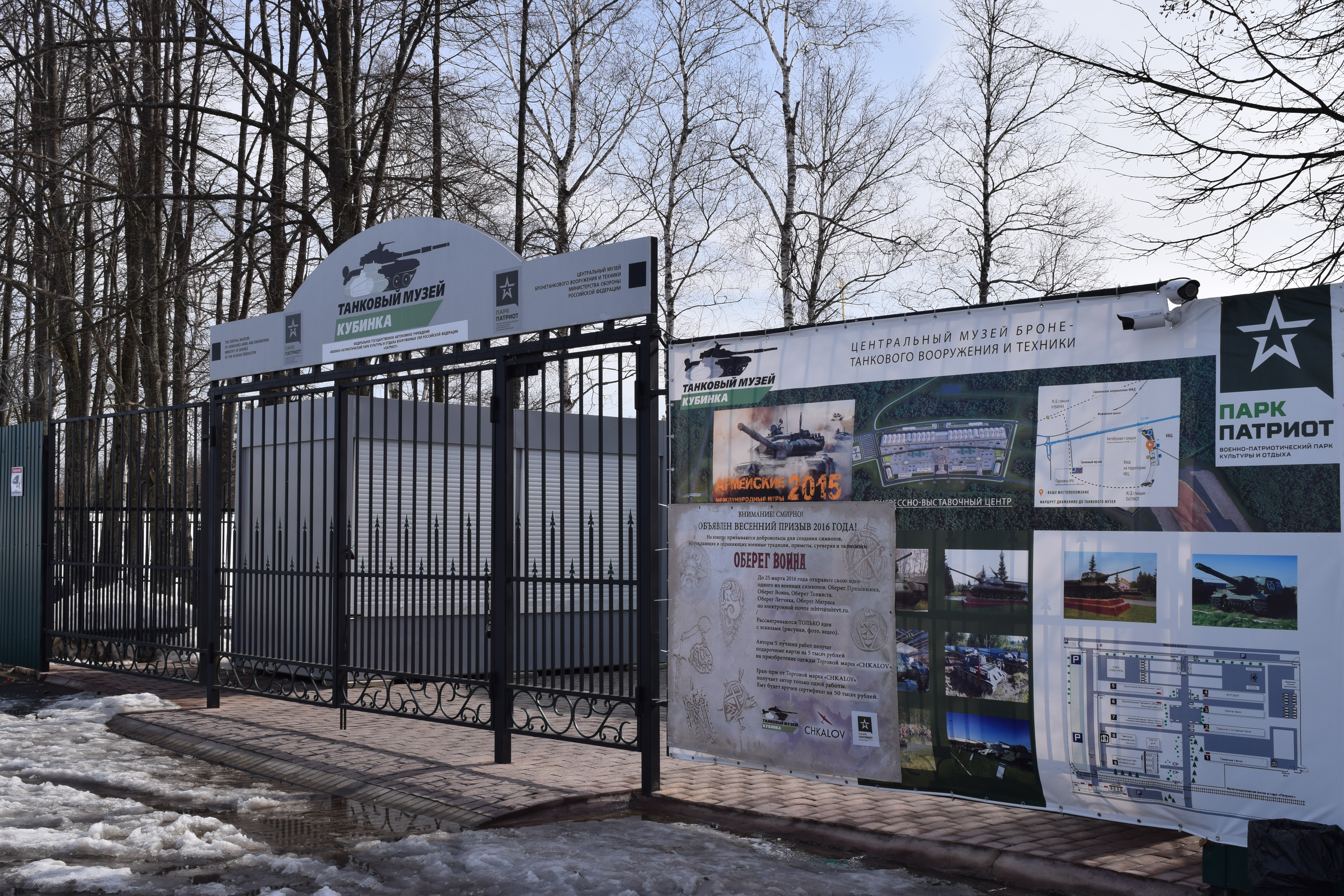
- Entrance

- Location within Moscow Oblast
- Established: 1972
- Location: Kubinka, Moscow oblast, Russia
- Coordinates: 55°33′54″N 36°42′56″E
- Key holdings: Panzerkampfwagen VIII Maus, Karl-Gerät, Object 279
- Visitors: 70,000 a year

The Kubinka Tank Museum (Russian: Центральный музей бронетанкового вооружения и техники, romanized: Tsentral'nyy Muzey Bronetankovogo Vooruzheniya I Tekhniki, lit. 'Central Museum of Armored Arms and Technology') is a large military museum in Kubinka, Odintsovsky District, Moscow Oblast, Russia, where tanks, armoured fighting vehicles (AFVs) and their relevant information are displayed and showcased. The museum consists of open-air and indoor permanent exhibitions of many famous tanks and armored vehicles from throughout the 20th and 21st centuries (between 1917 and the present day). It also houses and displays many unique, unusual and one-of-a-kind military vehicles of which there are very few remaining examples, such as the German Panzer VIII Maus super-heavy tank, Troyanov's Object 279 Kotin heavy tank, the Karl-Gerät heavy self-propelled artillery, and the Object 120 Su-152 "Taran" tank destroyer, amongst other single or limited-production prototypes from the Soviet Union and Nazi Germany.

== History ==
The Kubinka Tank Museum is located on a historically "classified" Red Army armor testing facility. Most of its displays in the museum were derived from the research collection of the still-functioning Kubinka armour testing and proving ground. Most Cold War-era Western tanks (from the US or Western Europe) were war trophies from the Middle East, Africa, Vietnam and Latin America, which were all sent to the armour testing facility at Kubinka to study and focus on any strengths and weaknesses. Due to its secretive history as well as its close relationship with the military, the museum is still staffed entirely by Russian Armed Forces personnel today. As belonging to an official military unit, the staff of the museum wears a special sleeve insignia on their uniform.

Since 2014, the museum has been a part of the Patriot military theme park.

== Admission and visitor restrictions ==
As of 2017, access into the museum is available for all visitors. The entrance fee is 300–500 rubles (US$4–US$7), depending on the particular part of the site, which is wide-spread. Guided tours in English are more expensive, starting at 4500 (US$60) rubles for each site. Access for children under the age of six is free. Permission to film and record videos of any vehicles is included in the entrance fee. Foreign citizens are recommended to have a copy of their passport to enter the museum, as well as the original version. As it is still part of a Kubinka military base, weapons and alcohol are strictly prohibited; at the entrances, inspections are carried out by security staff with the help of metal detectors.

== Exhibits ==
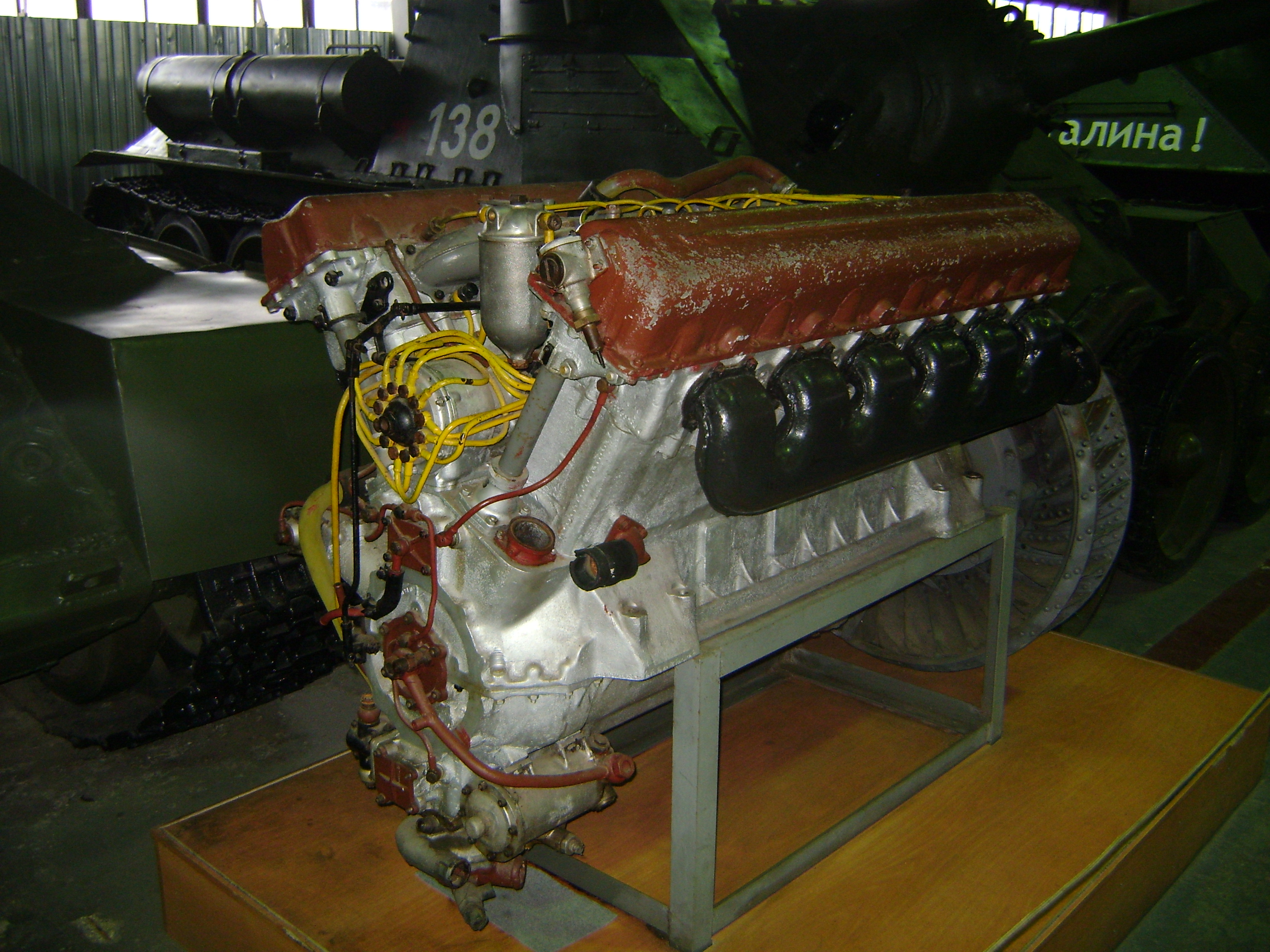
V-2-34 engine in the Kubinka Museum

The museum hosts a wide variety of tanks and armoured vehicles developed and used throughout the 20th century by the Soviets, Germans and other nations. Around 60% of the exhibits are Soviet-era vehicles, with the most recent display being the Object 172, the prototype of the T-72 MBT.

Apart from that, the museum also exhibits an Ilyushin Il-2 plane wreck, anti-tank artillery, a cutaway model of a V-2-34 engine and other miscellaneous items.

=== Exhibition halls ===
- Heavy tanks and self-propelled guns of the USSR
- Combat power of the Urals
- Light tanks and armoured personnel carriers
- Infantry fighting vehicles and armoured personnel carriers
- Foreign armoured vehicles
- Wehrmacht behemoths, American armoured vehicles

=== World War II ===
Kubinka was a top-secret armour testing range and proving ground from before World War II. All new designs from Russian research and design bureaus, facilities and factories had to be first tested here. Before Operation Barbarossa in June 1941, some German tanks and AFVs were sold to the Soviet Union and these were also tested at Kubinka. A few captured Tiger I heavy tanks were brought to the testing and proving grounds at Kubinka in 1943 to be subjected to firing tests so as to gauge its armour protection level and field or develop weapons that would knock out the tank. In 1945 the Soviet Union also tested captured Japanese tanks that were seized after the rapid Soviet invasion of Manchuria, South Sakhalin, the Kuril Islands, northern China and northern Korea.

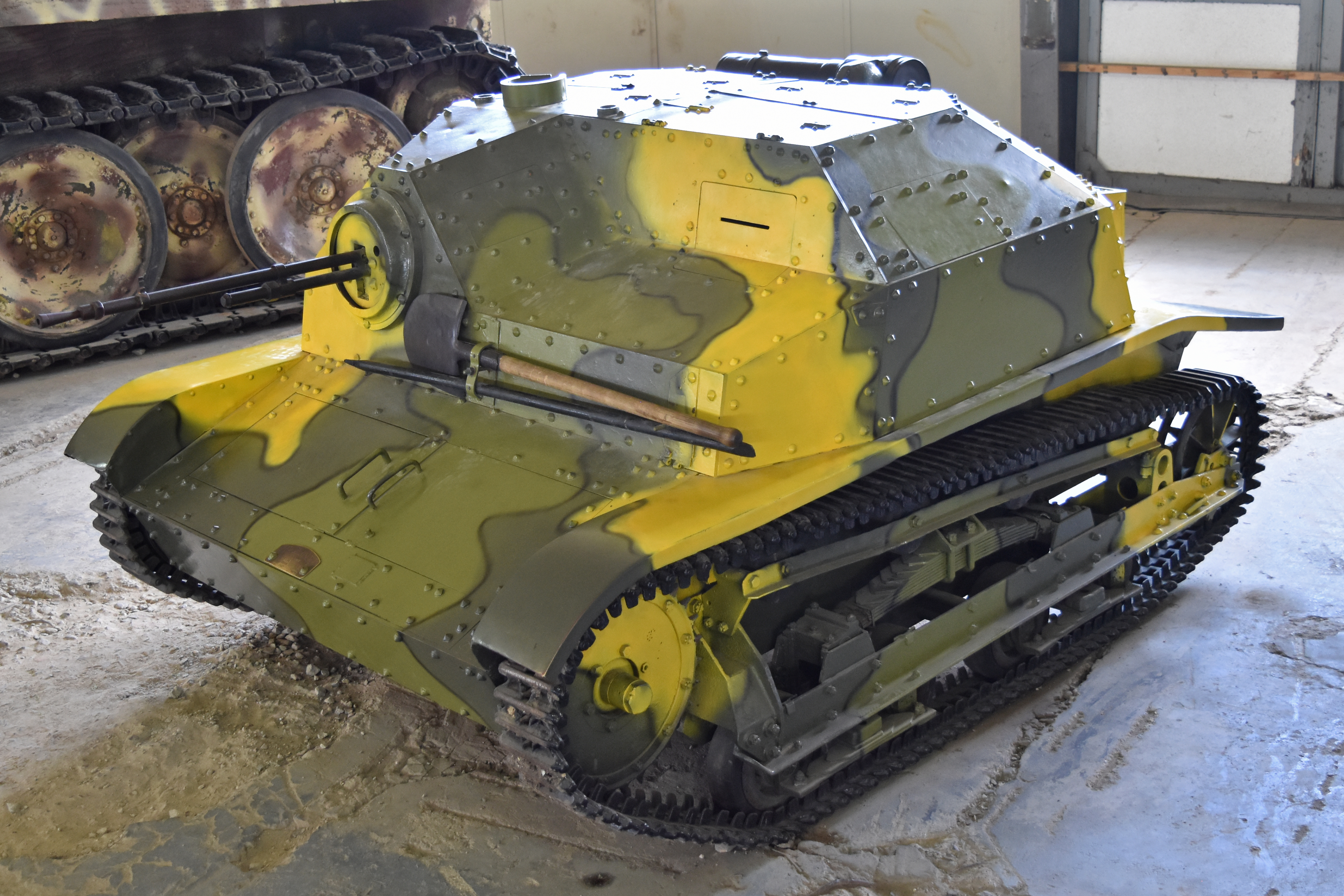
Polish TKS tankette in Kubinka Tank Museum

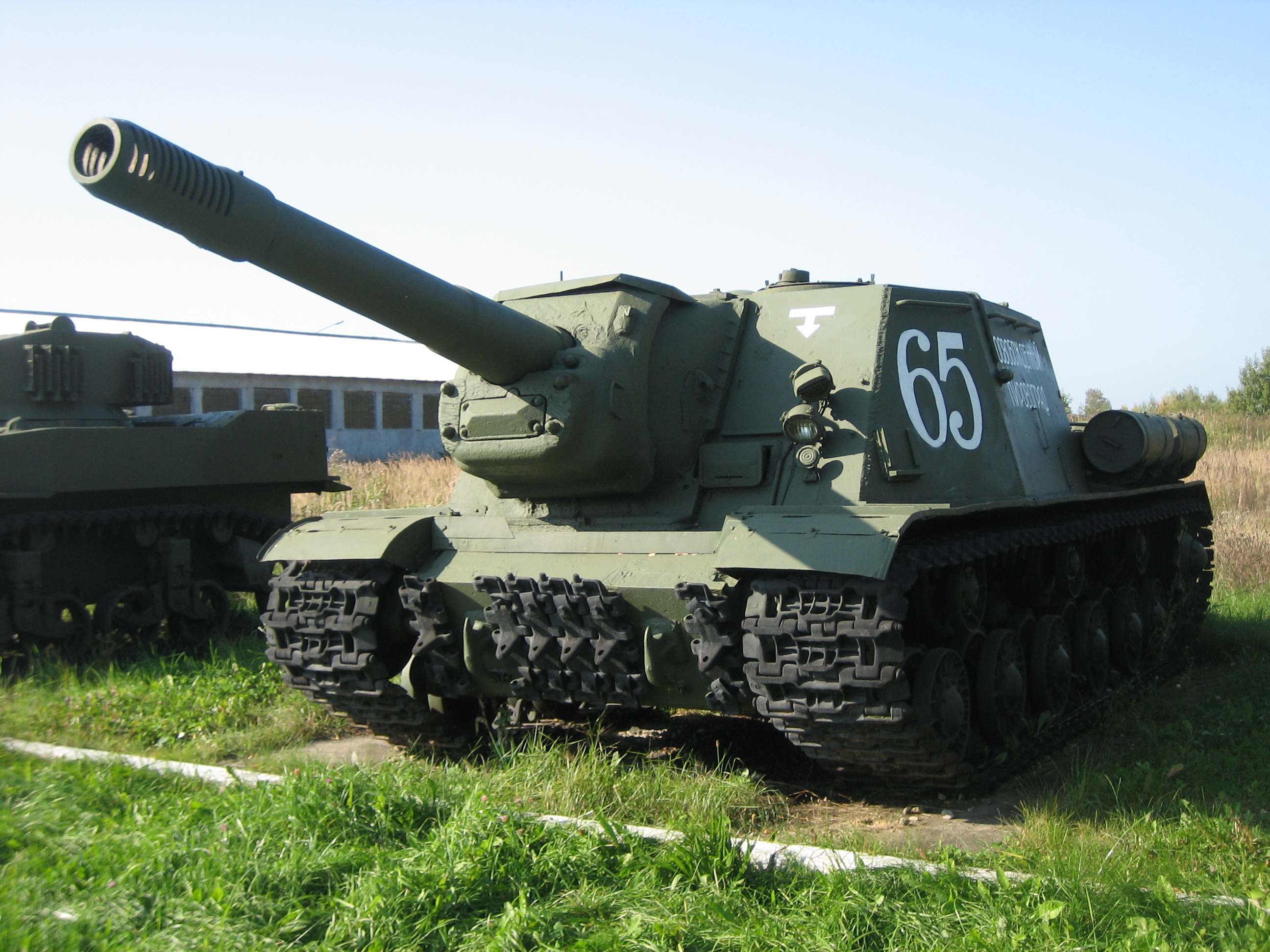
ISU-152 at Kubinka

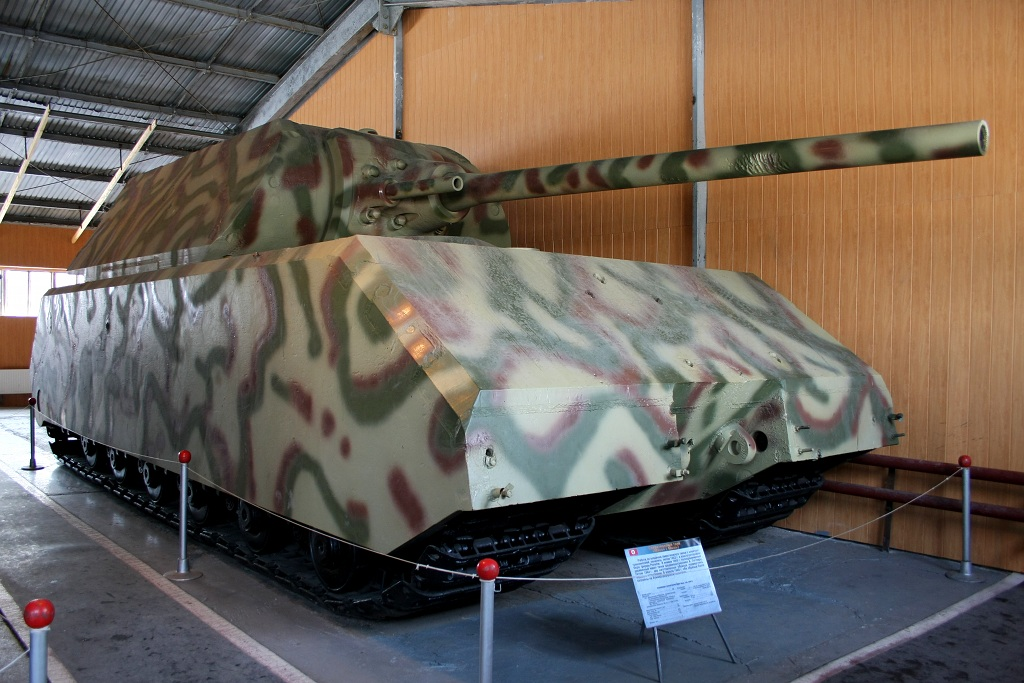
Panzer VIII Maus at the Kubinka Tank Museum

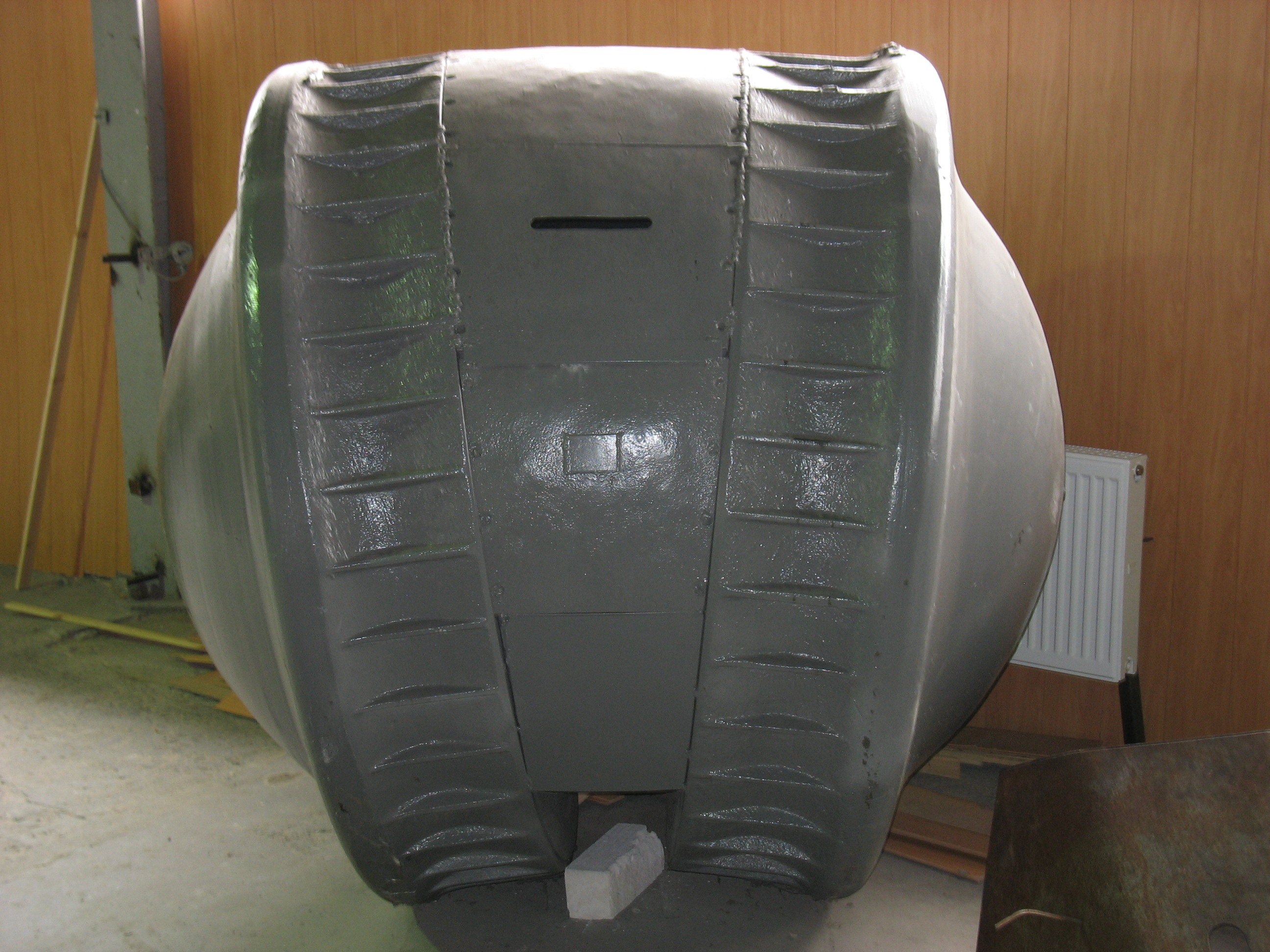
Kugelpanzer at Kubinka

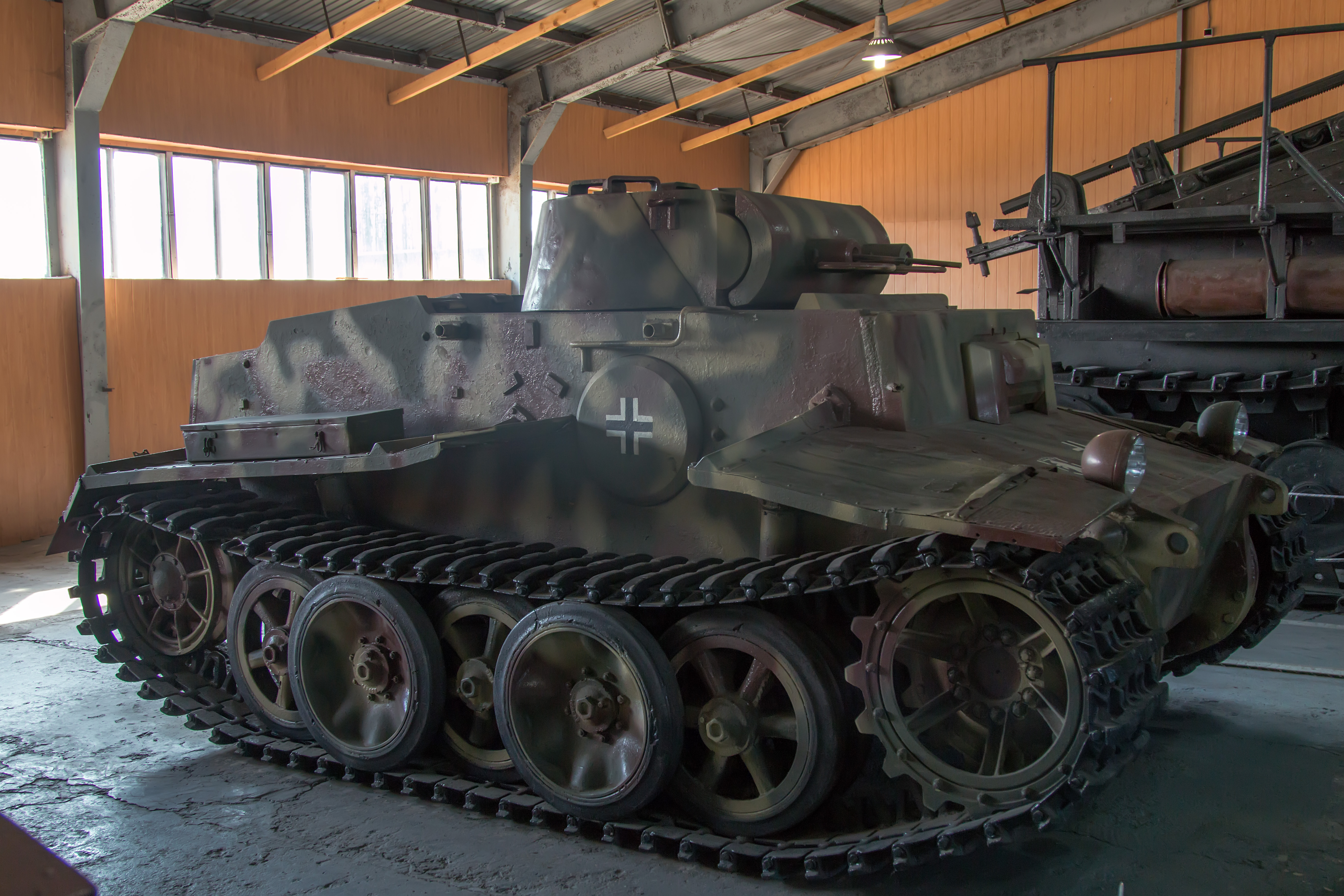
Panzer I Ausf. F in the Kubinka Tank Museum

=== Cold War ===
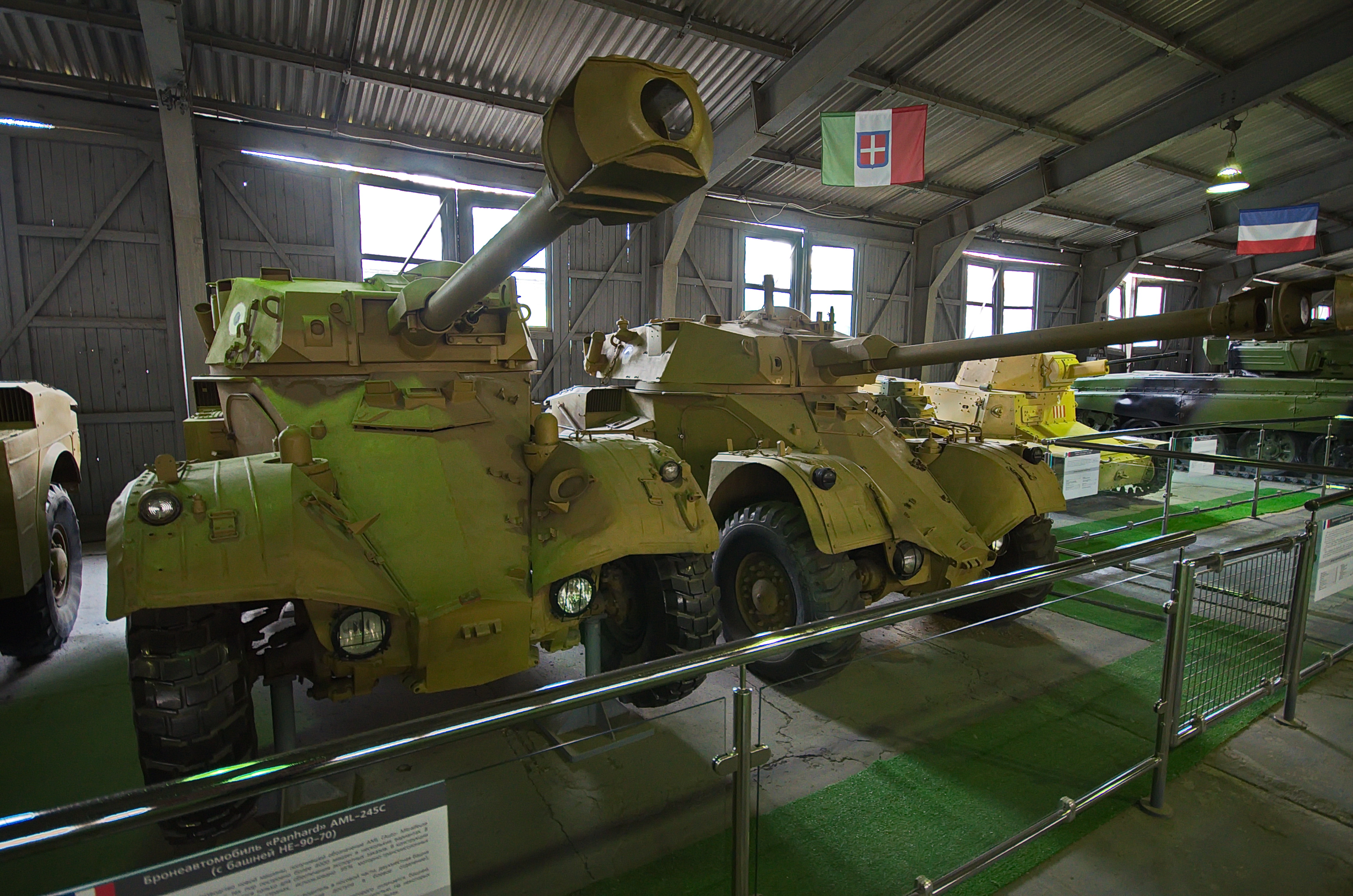
Two armoured cars, a French Panhard AML-90 (left) and a South African Eland-90 (right) on display at the Kubinka Tank Museum

Soviet tank technology was chiefly concentrated at the Kubinka Force Technology Center, which provided a series of technical evaluations and testing and relevant information to the national defense system to facilitate potential or future tank designs. Today, the Kubinka Tank Museum exhibits more than 50 tanks and other armoured fighting vehicles procured from abroad during the Cold War.

Some of these vehicles are as follows:

- An M24 Chaffee light tank of the French colonial armies and participated in the First Indochina War between 1946 and 1954.
- A M41 Walker Bulldog light tank was sent to the Kubinka Force Technology Center during the early 1960s or early 1970s.
- Some M48 Patton medium tanks.
- An M60 Patton main battle tank (MBT) was also captured by Syria from Israel in 1982 and donated to the Soviet Union.
- Former American M26 Pershing and M46 Patton medium tanks, which were captured by the Chinese People's Volunteer Army (PVA) during the Korean War.
- M113 armoured personnel carriers (APCs) were captured by North Vietnam during the Vietnam War.
- A former Iranian Army Chieftain Mk.5 MBT and an FV101 Scorpion light tank were sent to the Soviet Union by Iraq during the Iran–Iraq War.
- An IDF M51 Super Sherman medium tank was captured by either Egypt or Syria and was sent to the Soviet Union.
- A French AMX-13/75 light tank that was received from Algeria after the Algerian War during the 1950s and the 1960s.
- Two French Panhard AML armoured reconnaissance vehicles and their South African counterpart, an Eland.

== See also ==
- Musée des Blindés – France
- The Tank Museum – United Kingdom
- Yad La-Shiryon – Israel
- Parola Tank Museum – Finland
- Army Museum – Poland
- Polish Army Museum – Poland
- Military museum Lešany – Czech Republic
- German Tank Museum – Germany
- Military Museum, Belgrade – Serbia
- Ontario Regiment Museum – Canada
- Canadian War Museum – Canada
- Base Borden Military Museum - Canada
- Dutch Cavalry Museum – The Netherlands
- Nationaal Militair Museum – The Netherlands
- Royal Tank Museum – Jordan
- American Heritage Museum – United States
- Cavalry Tank Museum, Ahmednagar – India
- Australian Armour and Artillery Museum – Australia
