= Panzer I Ausf. F =

German light tank

Panzerkampfwagen I Ausf. F
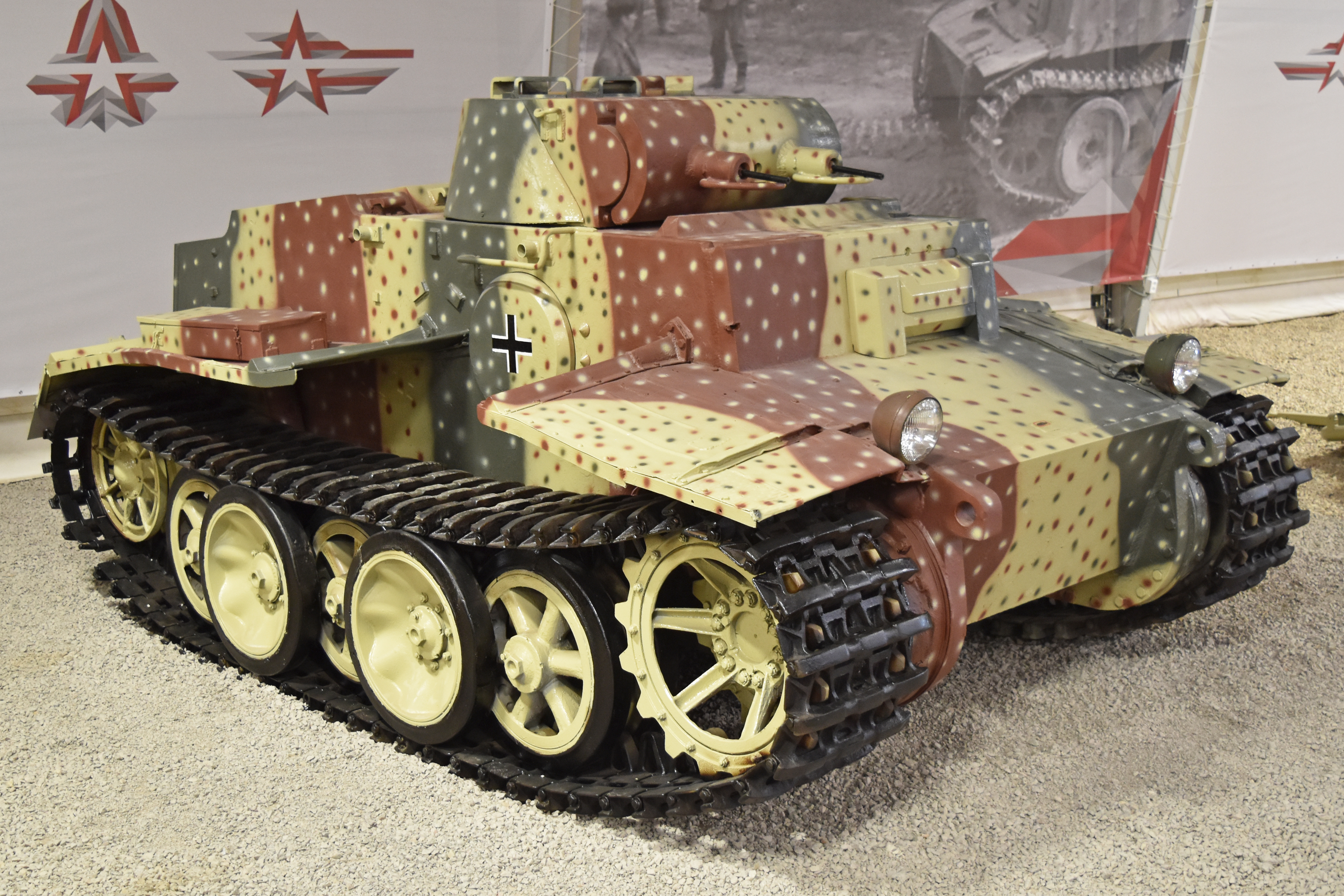
- Pz.Kpfw. I Ausf. F in Kubinka Tank Museum
- Type: Light tank
- Place of origin: Germany

Service history
- In service: 1942–1944
- Used by: Nazi Germany
- Wars: World War II

Production history
- Designed: 1941–1942
- Manufacturer: Krauss-Maffei
- Produced: 1942
- No. built: 30 produced

Specifications
- Mass: 21 long tons (21 t; 24 short tons)
- Length: 4.375 m (14 ft 4.2 in)
- Width: 2.640 m (8 ft 7.9 in)
- Height: 2.050 m (6 ft 8.7 in)
- Crew: 2: commander and driver
- Armor: 20–80 mm (0.79–3.15 in)
- Main armament: 2 × 7.92 mm MG-34
- Engine: HL 45P 6-cylinder 150 hp (110 kW)
- Power/weight: 7.1
- Suspension: Individual torsion bar
- Operational range: 150 km (93 mi) on-road; 110 km (68 mi) off-road.
- Maximum speed: 25 km/h (16 mph)

The Panzerkampfwagen I Ausf. F, also known as VK 18.01, was a German light tank from World War II. Despite the fact that it was designated as a modification of the Panzer I light tank, the VK 18.01 was a completely new vehicle that had almost nothing to do with other Panzer I variants. The Pz.Kpfw.I Ausf.F was created in 1942 as a light tank designed to storm fortified lines. In that same year, 30 units were produced (No. 150301-150330). From 1943 it was used for anti-guerrilla operations on the Eastern Front and in Yugoslavia. Thirty Panzer I Ausf. F tanks were built between April and December 1942, eight of which were sent to the Eastern Front for evaluation.

The Pz.Kpfw.I Ausf.F was almost the same as the Panzer II Ausf. J in terms of armor, which itself did not enter serial production.

== History ==
Since the end of 1938, the German army leadership knew that the Panzer I no longer had any potential as a combat tank and all new developments were directed towards reconnaissance or infantry support tanks. The Panzer I Ausf. F was a completely new design that used few elements of the original Panzer I Ausf. A, B and C. It varied from the earlier Panzer I design with an increase in armour and new suspension. The design bureau called for the tank to mount the maximum armour protection possible. The Panzerkampfwagen I Ausf. F was a design intended to modify the Panzer I tank to become a light tank with heavy and thick armor (~80mm) in order to assist the infantry in the attack operations. The initial order of 30 pieces was given in December of 1939, to be produced by Krauss-Maffei and Daimler-Benz. An additional order of 100 pieces was cancelled even before production began.

== Description ==
The Panzer I Ausf. F uses the same armor layout as the Panzer II Ausf. J however it lacks one of the view ports on the upper frontal glacis plate. Its armor at the front was virtually impenetrable to anti-tank weapons at the time. It has 80mm frontal armour, 50mm on the side and rear, and 25mm top and bottom. However, the armour had little to no slope.

The engine was a Maybach HL45 P 6-cylinder delivering 150 hp (110 kW) into a four-speed gearbox with one reverse gear (though one source states it used the 6-speed SSG 47 gearbox). For the Panzer I Ausf. F a special suspension (Schachtellaufwerk) had been developed with overlapping wheels and a torsion bar suspension. This allowed larger wheels and permitted use of low quality rubber which was at the time a scarce raw material in Germany on them.

For the tank commander, five periscopes had been built into the dome that gave a view to the front and sides of the tank. In addition, the commander had a visor for the two 7.92 mm MG 34 machine guns. The driver had a folding peephole at the front of one periscope on the left. A FuG 2 radio was fitted.

== Production ==
Serial production of the tank was in 1942, a total of 30 tanks were built:

Pz.Kpfw.I Ausf.F production in 1942
Month	April	May	June	July	August	September	October	November	December	Total
Number	3	12	0	0	5	3	2	4	1	30

== Combat use ==
The first tanks were sent to the Eastern Front in May 1942 with the 66th Special Tank Battalion near Leningrad. By September 1942 the Battalion was attached to the 12th Panzer Division. Eight Ausf. Fs (along with two Panzer I Ausf. C tanks) were issued to the 1st Panzer Division. Performance was poor as the tanks were sent into situations that they weren't designed for. Almost all of the Ausf. F models used by the 12th and 1st Divisions would be destroyed by the end of 1943. Five tanks were used to fight guerillas in Soviet occupied territory by the 2nd Police Tank Company, which were all destroyed by August 1944. The Ausf. F was also used to fight against guerilla activity in Yugoslavia. Three tanks survived World War II. One was captured by the United States and sent to Aberdeen Proving Ground, but was scrapped during the Korean War. Two others survive in Belgrade and Russia.

== Surviving vehicles ==
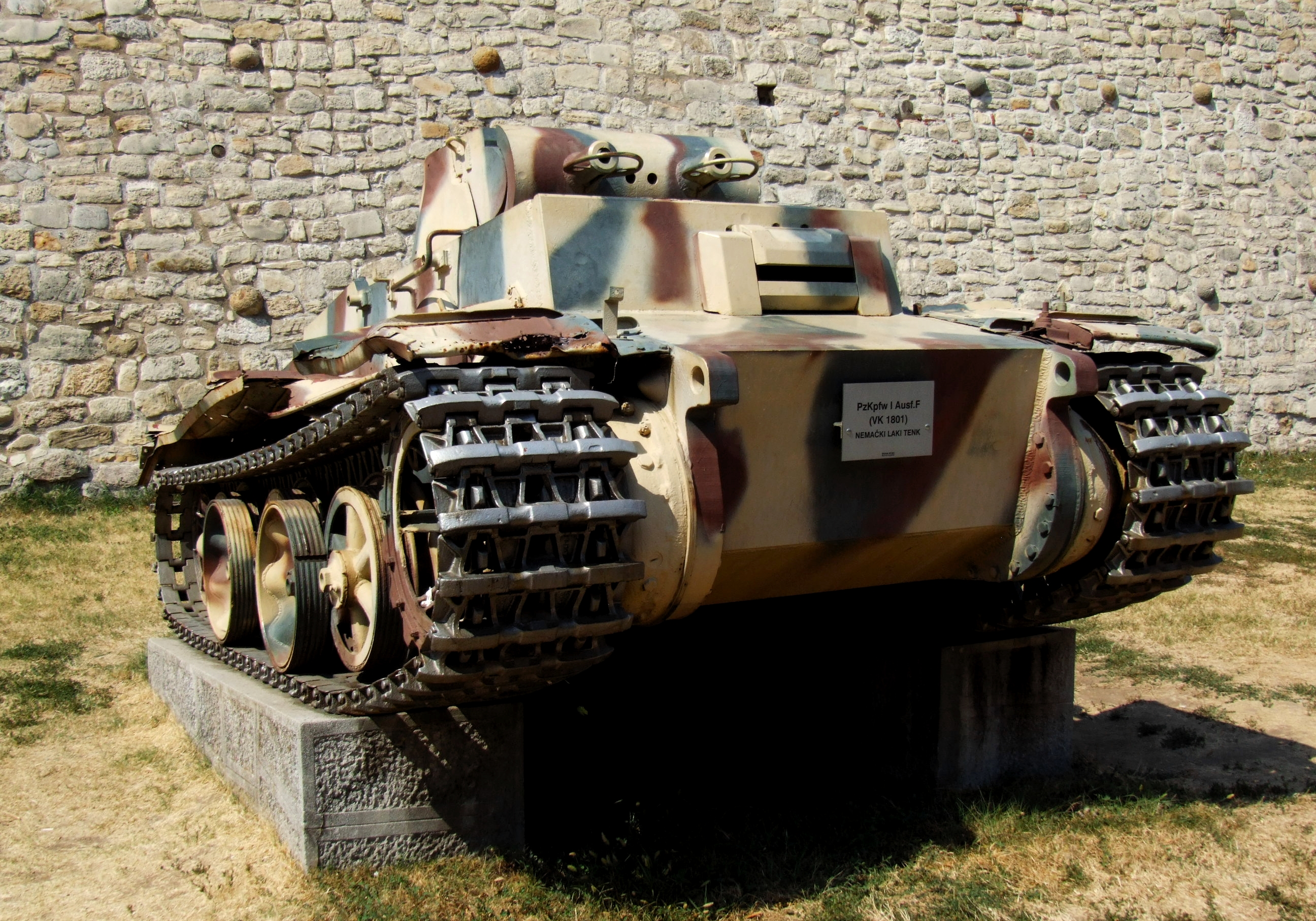
Pz.Kpfw. I Ausf. F in Belgrade Military Museum

Currently, 2 of the vehicles survive in museums:

Russia: The surviving vehicle was in Kubinka Tank Museum.

Serbia: Another was in Military Museum in Belgrade.

== See also ==
- Valiant - another WWII attempt at compact but heavily armoured tank
