= Kugelpanzer =

Light tank or possibly armoured car

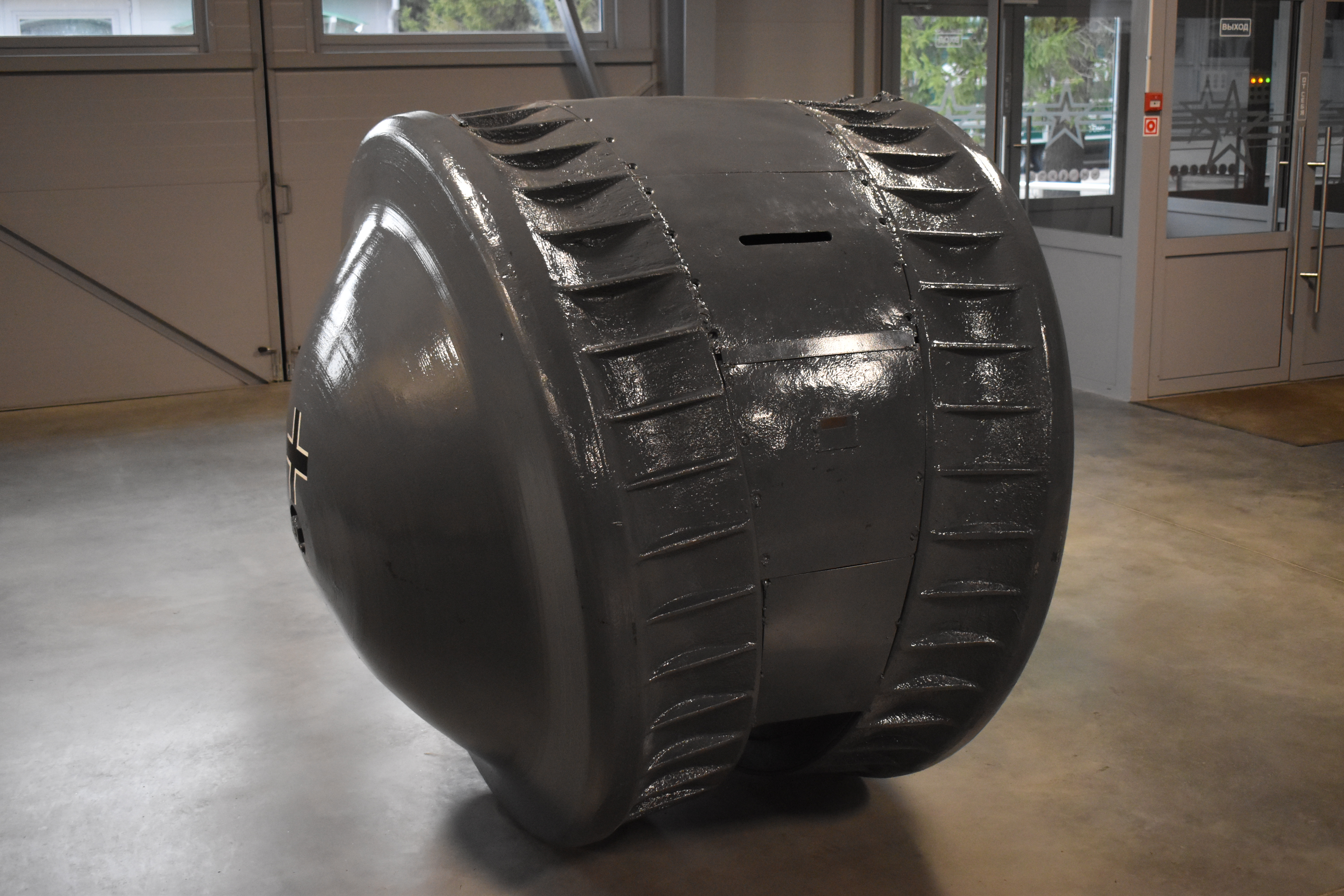
- The Kugelpanzer at the Kubinka Tank Museum
- Type: Either light tank or armoured car
- Place of origin: Nazi Germany

Service history
- In service: 1945
- Used by: Nazi Germany; Empire of Japan
- Wars: World War II; Second Sino-Japanese War

Production history
- Manufacturer: Krupp (presumed)
- Produced: 1945
- No. built: 1 (known)

Specifications
- Mass: 1.8 tonnes (4,000 lb)
- Length: 1.7 meters (5.5 feet)
- Height: 1.5 meters (4.9 feet)
- Crew: 1
- Armor: 5 millimetres (0.20 in)
- Engine: Single-cylinder two-stroke engine 18.4–22 kilowatts (24.7–29.5 hp)
- Suspension: None
- Maximum speed: 50 kilometres per hour (31 mph)

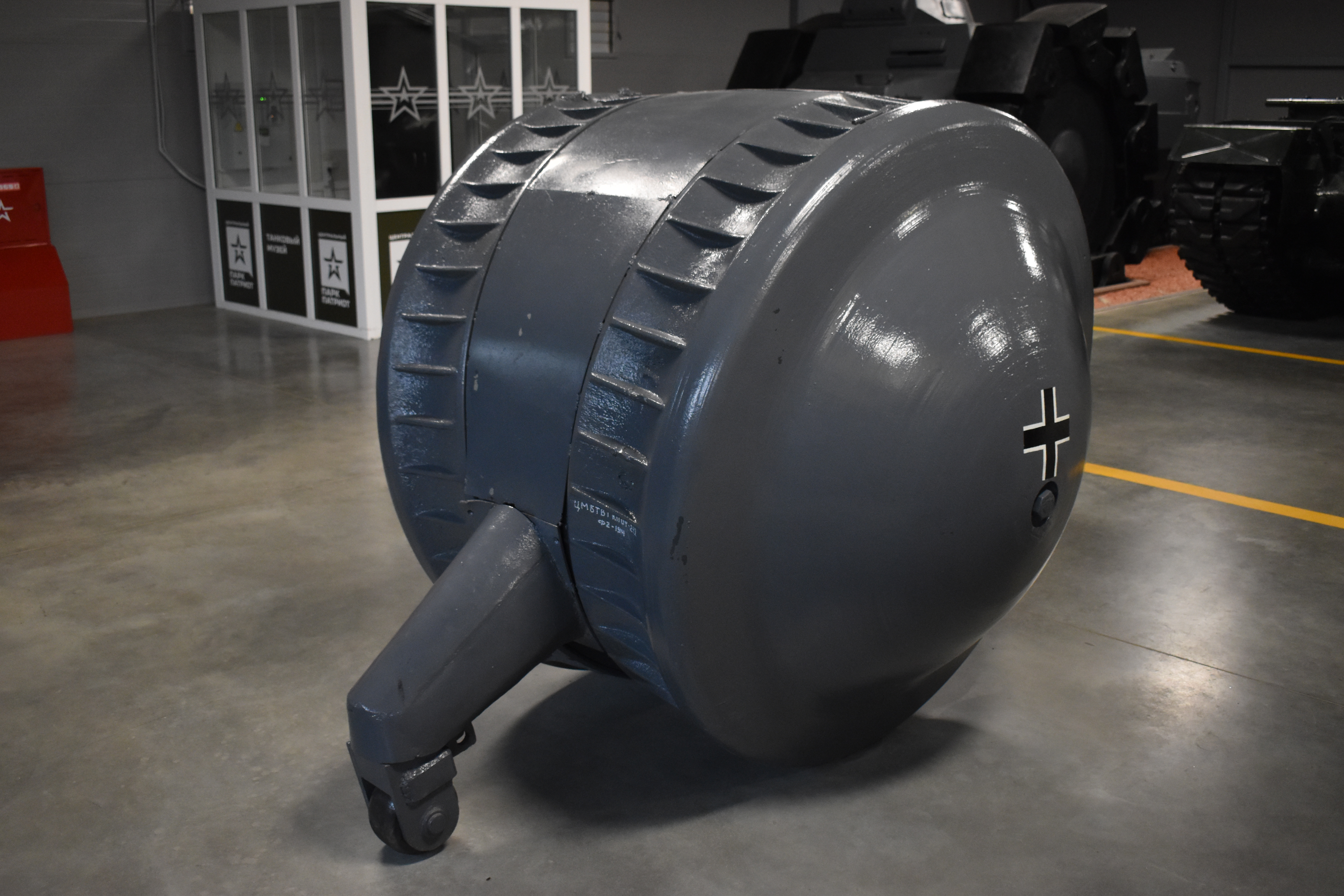
Side view of the vehicle

The Kugelpanzer (German for "ball tank") was a one-man armoured vehicle built by Nazi Germany during World War II. The history of the vehicle is practically unknown other than that at least one example was exported to the Empire of Japan and used by the Kwantung Army. The machine remains something of a mystery due to the lack of records and the incompleteness of the sole surviving model.

== Surviving example ==
Only one example of the Kugelpanzer still exists today. It is on display in the collection of German armored vehicles at the Kubinka Tank Museum in Moscow where it is described simply as "Exhibit No. 37". It is speculated that this vehicle was captured by the Red Army in Manchuria. There is no record of it ever having been used in combat. However, another report states that it was captured at the Kummersdorf proving grounds along with the infamous Maus super-heavy tank. The vehicle was modified after its capture, repainted and its drive removed. In 2000, the original paintwork was restored.

== Theories about the vehicle ==
Only five points seem certain based on the single known example:

1. It is a German-made vehicle that was shipped to Japan.
2. It was used as a light reconnaissance vehicle.
3. It was captured by Soviet troops in 1945, presumably in Manchuria.
4. The outer armour is only five millimetres thick.
5. The vehicle was powered by a single-cylinder two-stroke motorcycle engine.

The only clues as to the vehicle's function are its exterior features. It seems to be a one-man reconnaissance tank, equipped with an armoured outer wall and a viewing slot. The drive was probably located under or behind the driver. At the rear there is a steerable wheel to shift the center of gravity behind the axis of the two track wheels and to support rotary movements that are carried out with the track wheels. In stationary operation, the tank could probably serve as an armoured refuge or makeshift bunker. Based on available images, it cannot be determined whether there was an opening below the viewing slot to allow for the use of firearms from inside the tank. Another possible use is for demining, where this vehicle would trigger landmines ahead of advancing troops.

== Similar vehicles ==
Although not immediately equivalent, a possible precursor to the Kugelpanzer was a one-man World War I tank known in France as a bouclier roulant ("rolling shield"). A 1936 article in Popular Science described a Texan inventor's design for a spherical armoured vehicle that was dubbed a "tumbleweed tank". It was considerably larger than the Kugelpanzer, offering space for three people and three machine guns along with necessary motors and other equipment.

== See also ==
- Wunderwaffe
- Monowheel

== Books ==
Robert Dale Arndt Jr.: Strange Vehicles of Pre-War Germany & the Third Reich (1928–1945). 2006, IRP Publication
