= Obiekt 279 =

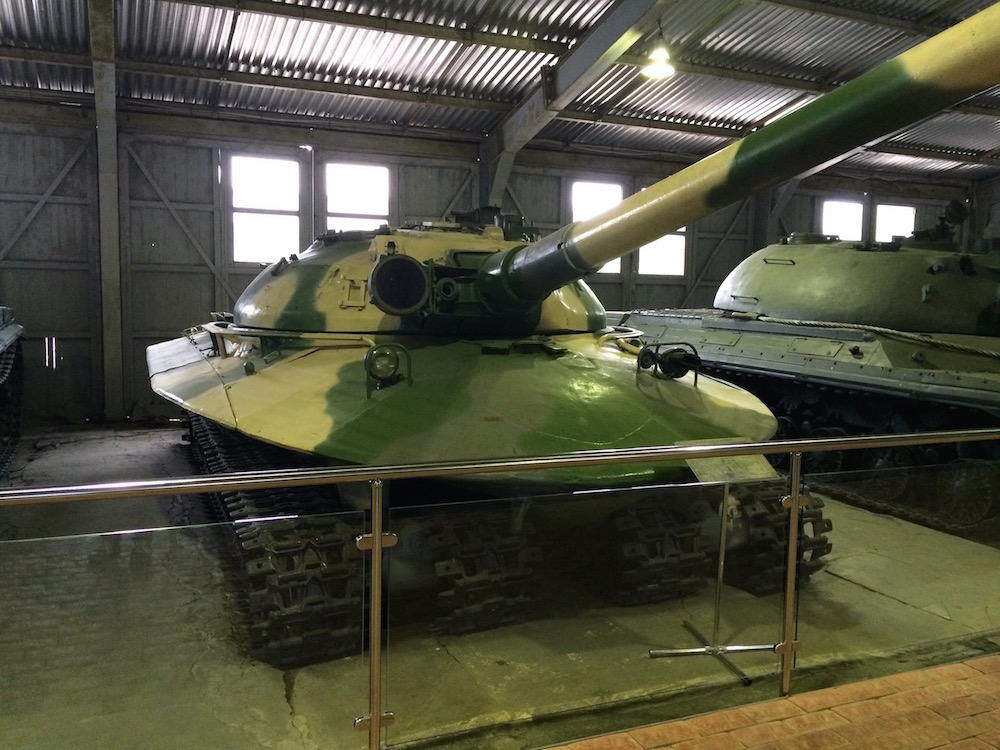
- Obiekt 279 in the Kubinka Tank Museum
- Type: Heavy tank
- Place of origin: Soviet Union

Production history
- Produced: 1959
- No. built: 1

Specifications
- Mass: 60 metric tons
- Length: 6.77 m (22 ft 3 in)
- length: 11.085 m (36 ft 4.4 in) with the gun
- Width: 3.400 m (11 ft 1.9 in)
- Height: 2.639 m (8 ft 7.9 in)
- Crew: 4 (driver, loader, gunner, commander)
- Armor: 319 mm – 217 mm (turret front and side) (at 30° – 50° from vertical); 269 mm – 93 mm (upper hull front) (at 45° – 75° from vertical); 258 mm – 121 mm (lower hull front) (at 45° – 70° from vertical); 182 mm – 100 mm (hull side) (at 45° – 65° from vertical)
- Main armament: 130 mm M-65 rifled tank gun L/60 (24 rounds)
- Secondary armament: 14.5 × 114 mm KPVT coaxial machine gun (800 rounds)
- Engine: 2DG-8M diesel engine 1,000 hp (750 kW)
- Operational range: 300 km (190 mi)
- Maximum speed: 55 km/h (34 mph)

The Obiekt 279, or Object 279, (Объект 279) was a Soviet experimental heavy tank developed at the end of 1959.

This special purpose tank was intended to fight on cross country terrain, inaccessible to conventional tanks, acting as a heavy breakthrough tank. It was planned as a tank of the Supreme Command Reserve.

== Design ==
The tank was developed at the Kirov Plant in Leningrad by a group headed by engineer L. Troyanov. The work on the tank started in 1957, which was based on a heavy tank operational requirements developed in 1956, and a pre-production tank was completed at the end of 1959.

This tank boasted increased cross-country capability; it featured forty seven-track running gear mounted on two longitudinal, rectangular hollow beams, which were also used as fuel tanks. The tank suspension was hydro-pneumatic with complex hydrotransformer (also known as torque converter) and three-speed planetary gearbox. The track adjuster was worm-type. The specific ground pressure of this heavy vehicle did not exceed 0.6 kg/cm^{2} (~8.5psi). The track chain, running practically along the whole track length provided for increased cross-country capabilities on swampy terrain, soft soils and area full of cut trees, Czech hedgehogs, and other antitank obstacles.

The tank was equipped with the powerful 1000 hp 2DG-8M diesel engine, enabling the 60 metric ton tank to attain 55 km/h (34mph) speed, with active range of 300 km (186 miles) on one refuel. It also had auto fire-fighting systems, smoke laying equipment and a combat compartment heating and cooling system.

=== Armor ===
The tank hull, with a maximum armour thickness of 269 mm (10.6 in), was covered by a thin, elliptical shield protecting it against APDS and shaped charge ammunition. The hull's distinctive, saucer-like elliptical shape was specifically engineered to streamline the tank against the blast wave of a nuclear explosion, preventing the shockwave from overturning the vehicle. It comprised large cast irregular shape structures of variable thickness and slope. The all-cast front part of the hull was rounded in shape with thin armour panels against HEAT projectiles, which ran around the edges of the front and sides of the hull. The sides of the hull were also cast and had similar protective armor panels.

The all-cast turret, with a maximum armor thickness of 319 mm, was rounded and had anti-HEAT protective panels. The turret ring was also heavily protected. The tank was equipped with chemical, biological, radiological, and nuclear (CBRN) protection.

=== Armament ===
The tank was armed with the 130 mm M-65 rifled gun. The secondary armament was a 14.5 x 114 mm KPVT coaxial machine gun with 800 rounds. The weapons were stabilized in two planes by a "Groza" stabilizer. Object 279 carried 24 rounds of ammunition, with charge and the shell to be loaded separately.

The gun was provided with a semi-automatic loading system with a rate of fire of 5–7 rounds/minute. Firing control system comprised optical rangefinder, auto-guidance system and L2 night-sight with an active infrared searchlight.

An improved variant of the gun was later tested on the experimental tank Object 785 in the late 1970s.

== History ==
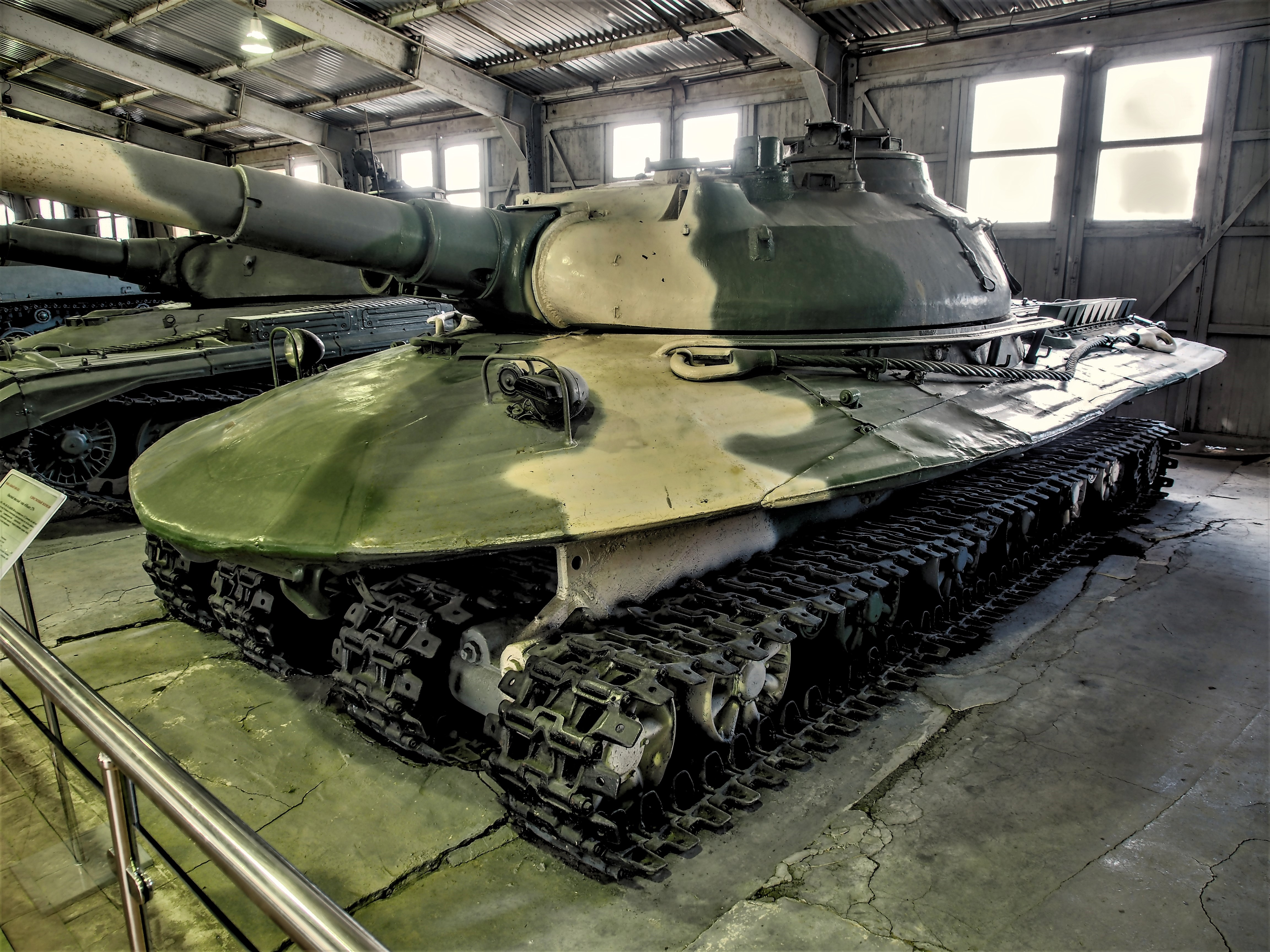
An Object 279 prototype on display at the Kubinka Tank Museum

One of the reasons that this tank project was abandoned, as with other heavy tank projects, was that the Soviet military ceased to operate such heavy fighting vehicles in 1960. Since then, the heaviest ones are kept at about 50 metric tons of weight, not counting extra equipment such as additional reactive armor or mine clearing devices. On July 22, 1960, at the demonstration of new technology on the range of Kapustin Yar, Nikita Khrushchev strictly forbade any tanks with a weight of more than 37 metric tons to be adopted by the military, having thus written off the entire program of heavy tanks that had proven to be so successful.

Adding to this decision was that Nikita Khrushchev himself was a supporter of an alternative – guided missile tanks, the most prominent of which was IT-1. Furthermore, the Soviet military wanted tanks with a suitable weight for crossing their own bridges, in case of homeland defence situations similar to those that occurred during World War II, which at that time seemed to be unreliable for heavy vehicle crossings. Another reason was that a number of serious deficiencies of the running gear appeared during the trials. These deficiencies included low nimbleness, efficiency loss during swampy area crossings, complex and expensive production, maintenance and repair, and impossibility of reduction in the overall height of the tank.

== Surviving vehicles ==
- Russia: One of the three examples of the tank survives on display at the Kubinka Tank Museum, and was restored to running condition in 2022.
