= Military Museum, Belgrade =

Military museum in Kalemegdan, Belgrade, Serbia

Military Museum Војни музеј Београд Vojni muzej Beograd
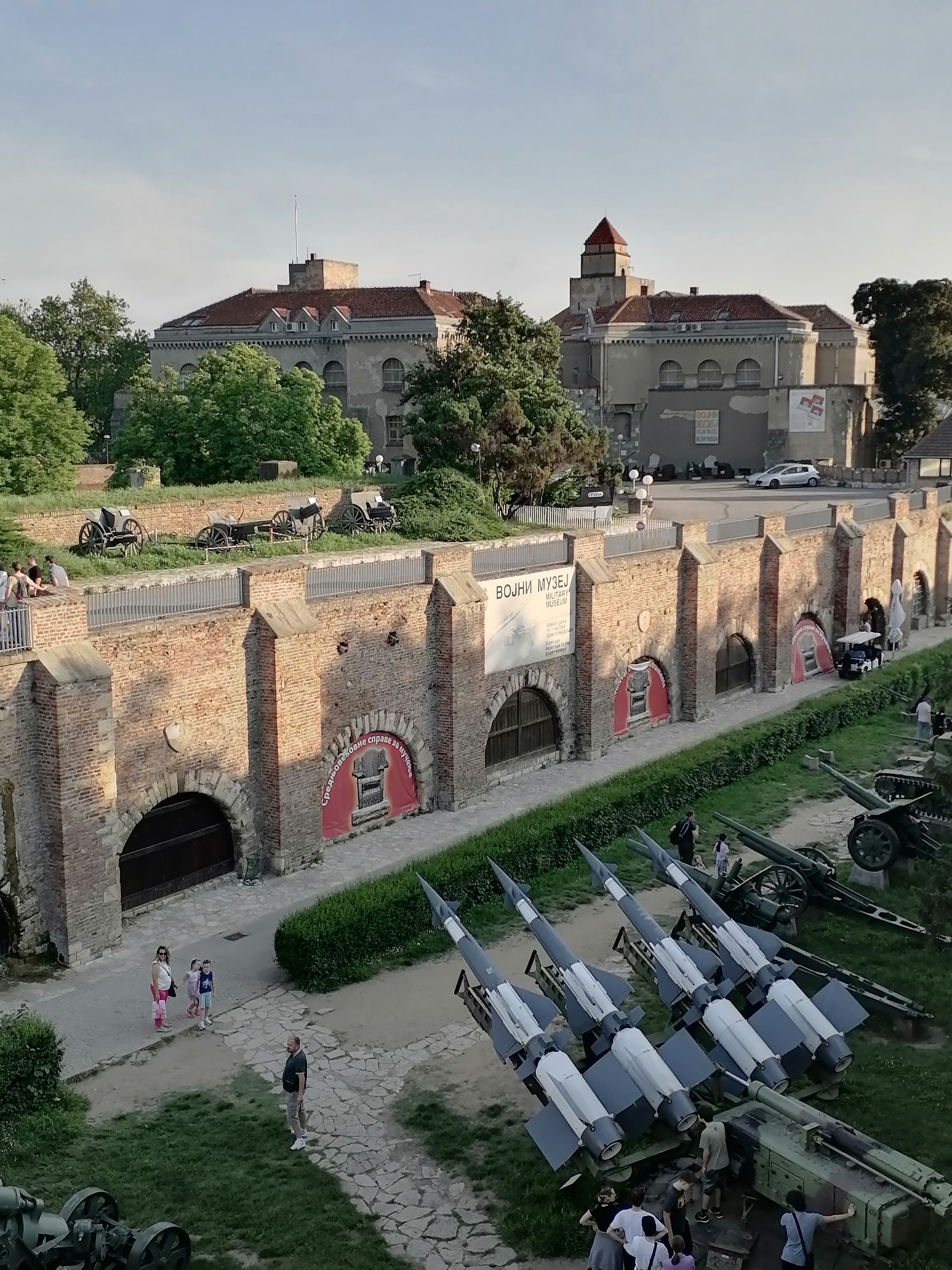
- Established: 1878; 148 years ago
- Location: Kalemegdan, Belgrade
- Coordinates: 44.8219°N 20.4500°E
- Type: Military museum
- Director: lieutenant colonel Gradimir Matic
- Curator: Čedomir Vokić
- Website: www.muzej.mod.gov.rs/en

The Military Museum (Serbian: Војни музеј, romanized: Vojni muzej) is a museum located in Belgrade, Serbia. Founded in 1878, the museum has over 3,000 ancient and modern items. These include Roman swords and helmets, Greek helmets and daggers, Serbian heavy knight's armor, axes, shields, helmets, crossbows, armoured gloves, as well as Western medieval weapons. There are also more modern guns, firearms, and elements of soldier's uniforms and equipment. Dioramas, plaques, and displays illustrate the use and historical context of the museum's collection.

Inside the museum's main building, the exhibits are found in a single long hall progressing from ancient through medieval and then towards modern. All exhibits are labeled in the Serbian Language in both Cyrillic and Latin, as well as English. Outside the museum's main building, there are numerous tanks, howitzers, and armoured cars of many types. Some were acquired during World War II, when they were captured by the Red Army and Yugoslav Partisans from retreating Nazi and Axis forces (Belgrade Offensive). These decommissioned tanks and artillery pieces line the walls and paths leading into the Military Museum from two directions. Recent exhibits address NATO actions against Serbia in 1999, including the controversial use of cluster bombs, depleted uranium, and graphite bombs, some of which are claimed to be in violation of international law. A well-known exhibit features parts of a US F-117 stealth aircraft which was downed by a Serbian S-125 Neva/Pechora.

The Military Museum is located inside the walls of the historic Belgrade Fortress, situated at the confluence of the Sava and Danube rivers and within a popular park known as the Kalemegdan Park, near the center of the city.

== Gallery ==
=== Outer Exhibition ===
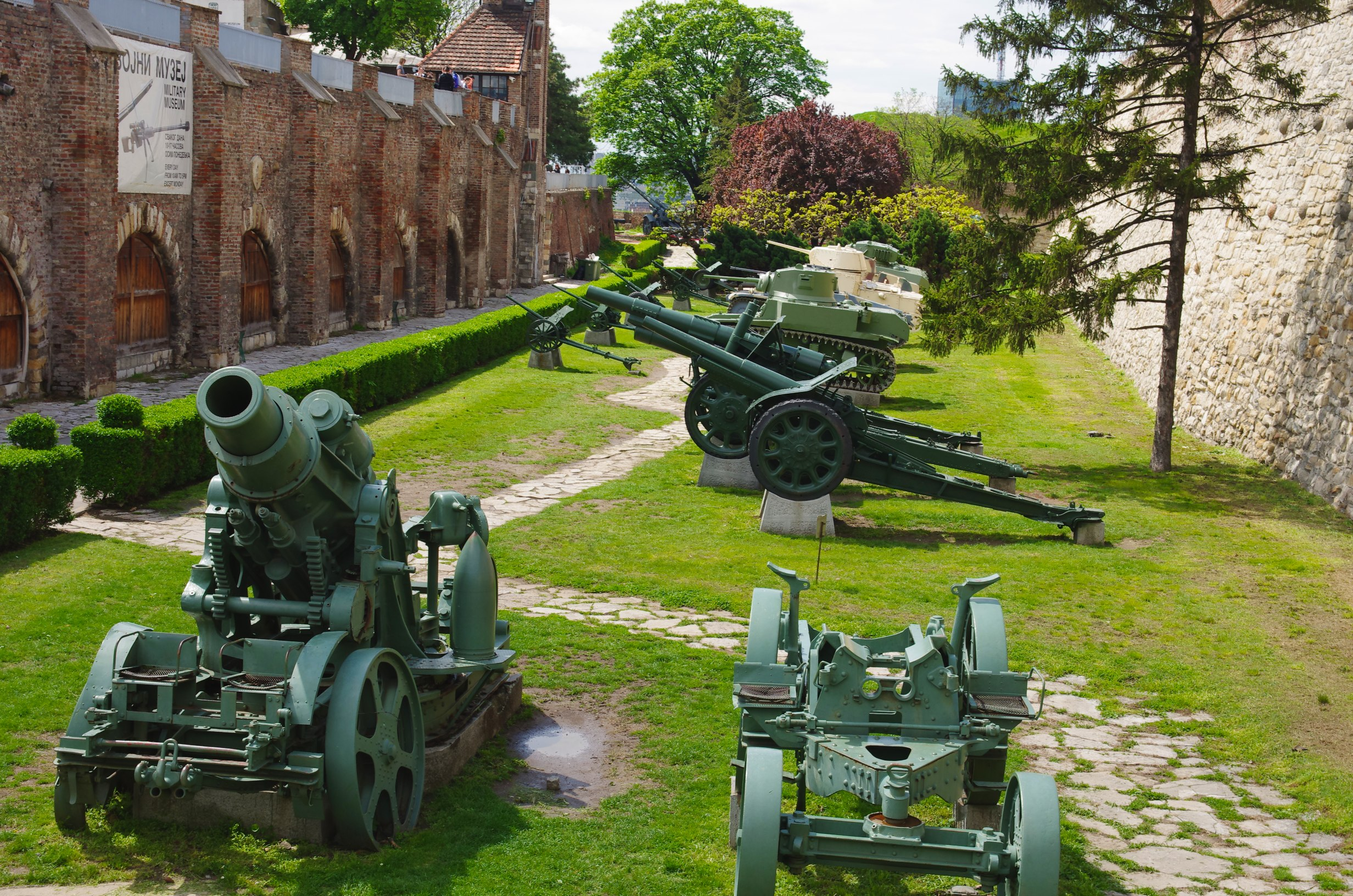
Belgrade Military Museum outer exhibition

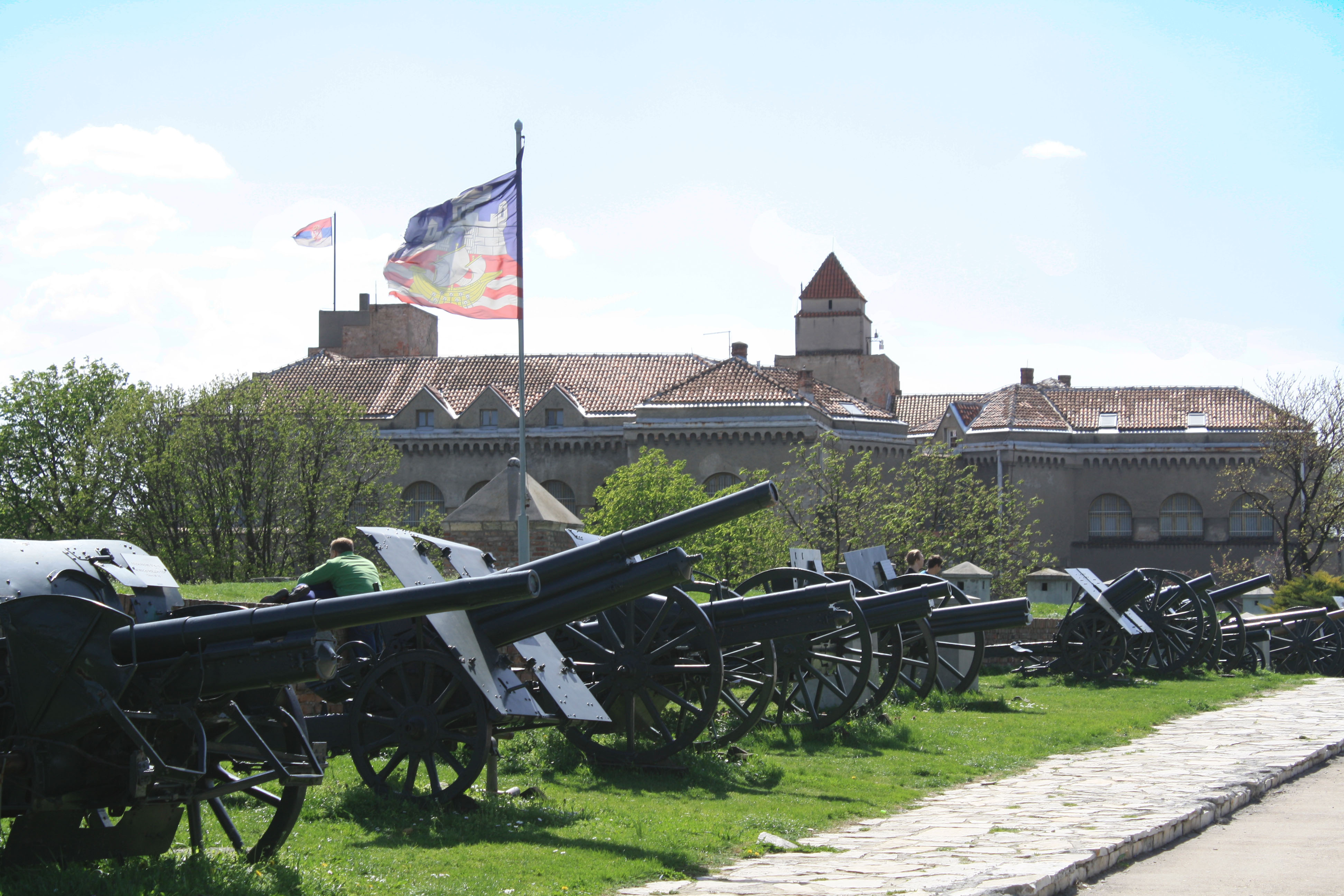
Various guns and howitzers

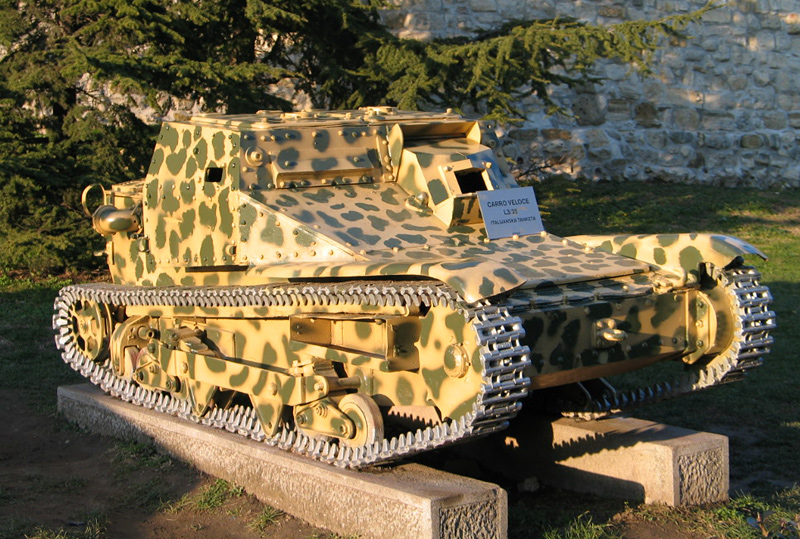
Italian tankette, L3/35

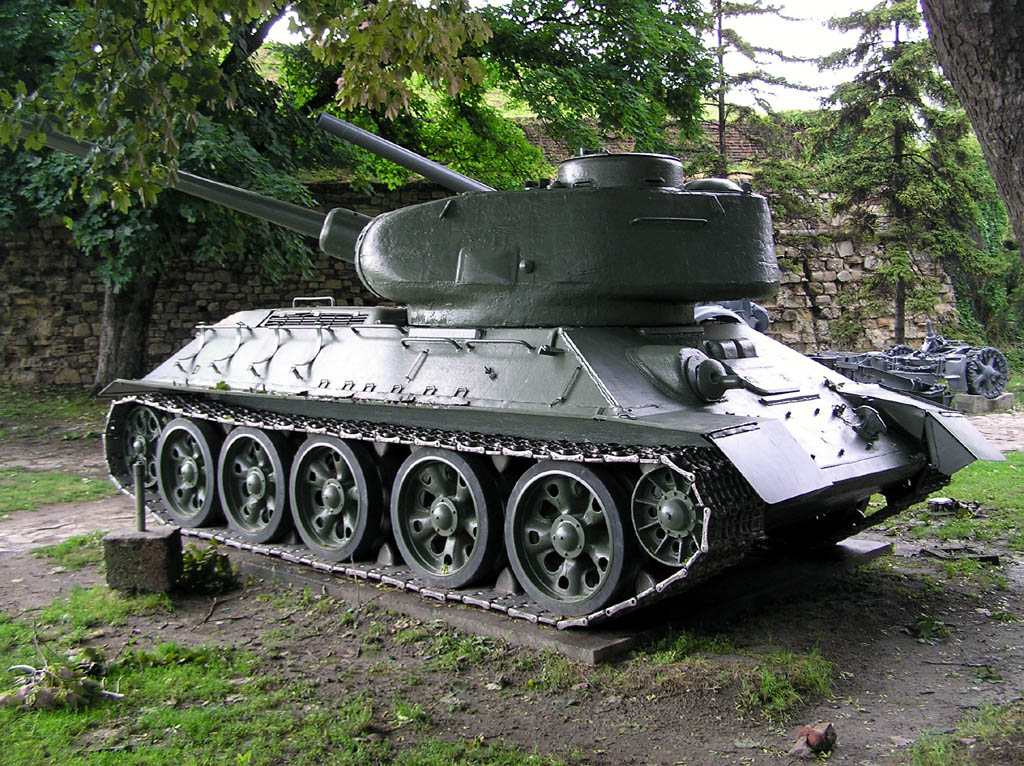
Soviet T-34-85 tank, a variant of T-34

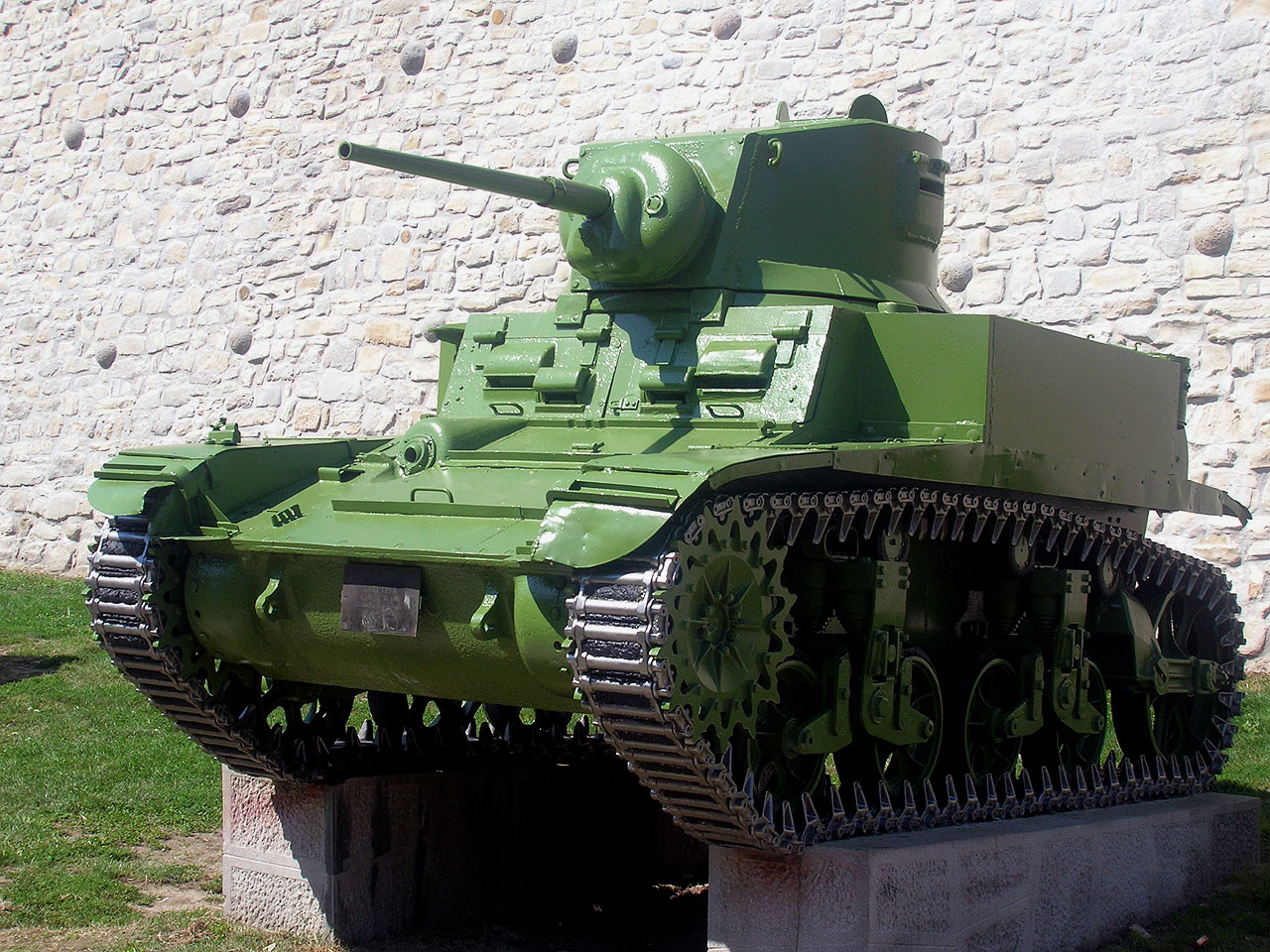
American M3 Stuart light tank

=== Inside Exhibition ===
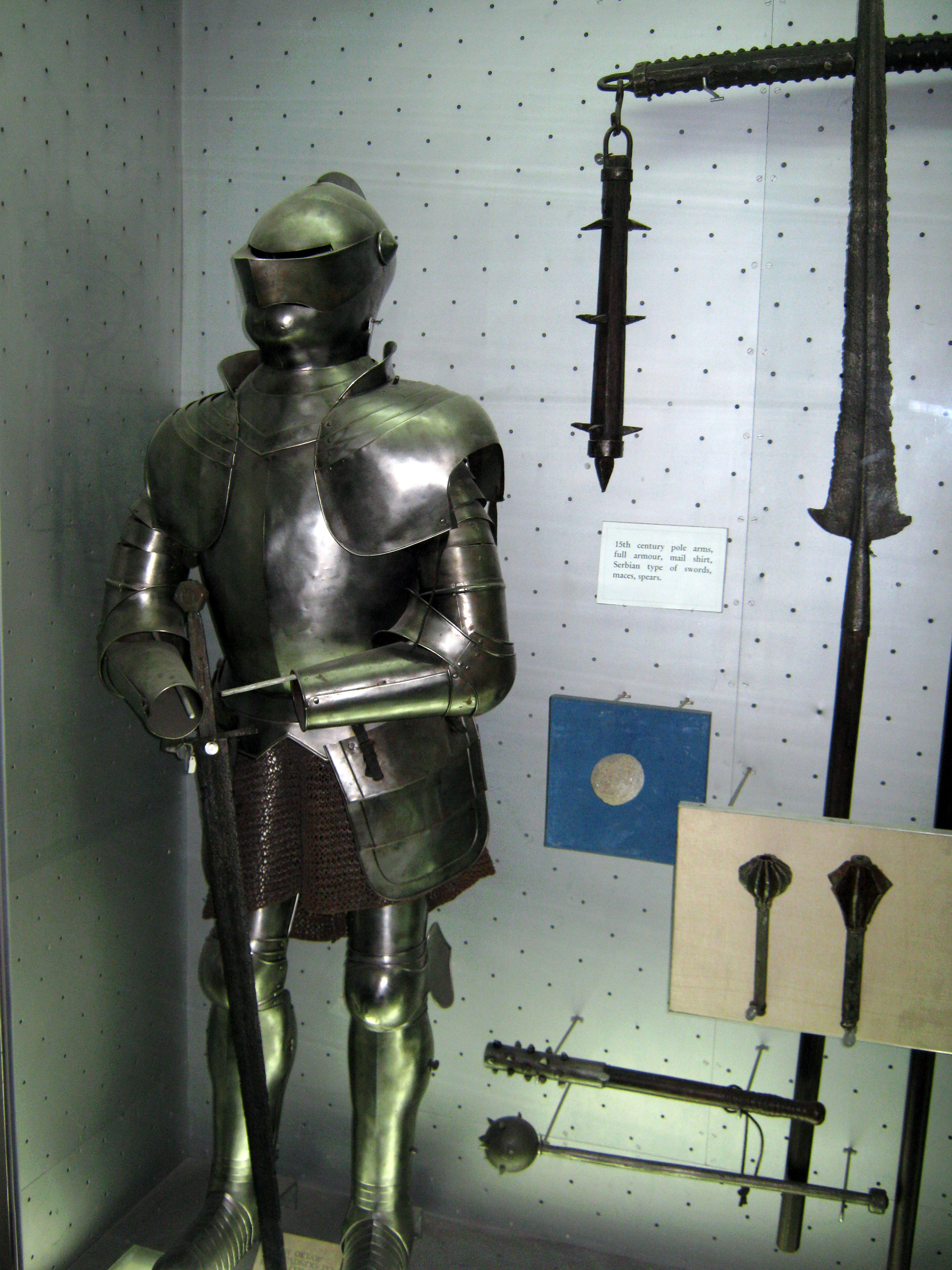
Serbian armor and equipment, 14 and 15th century.

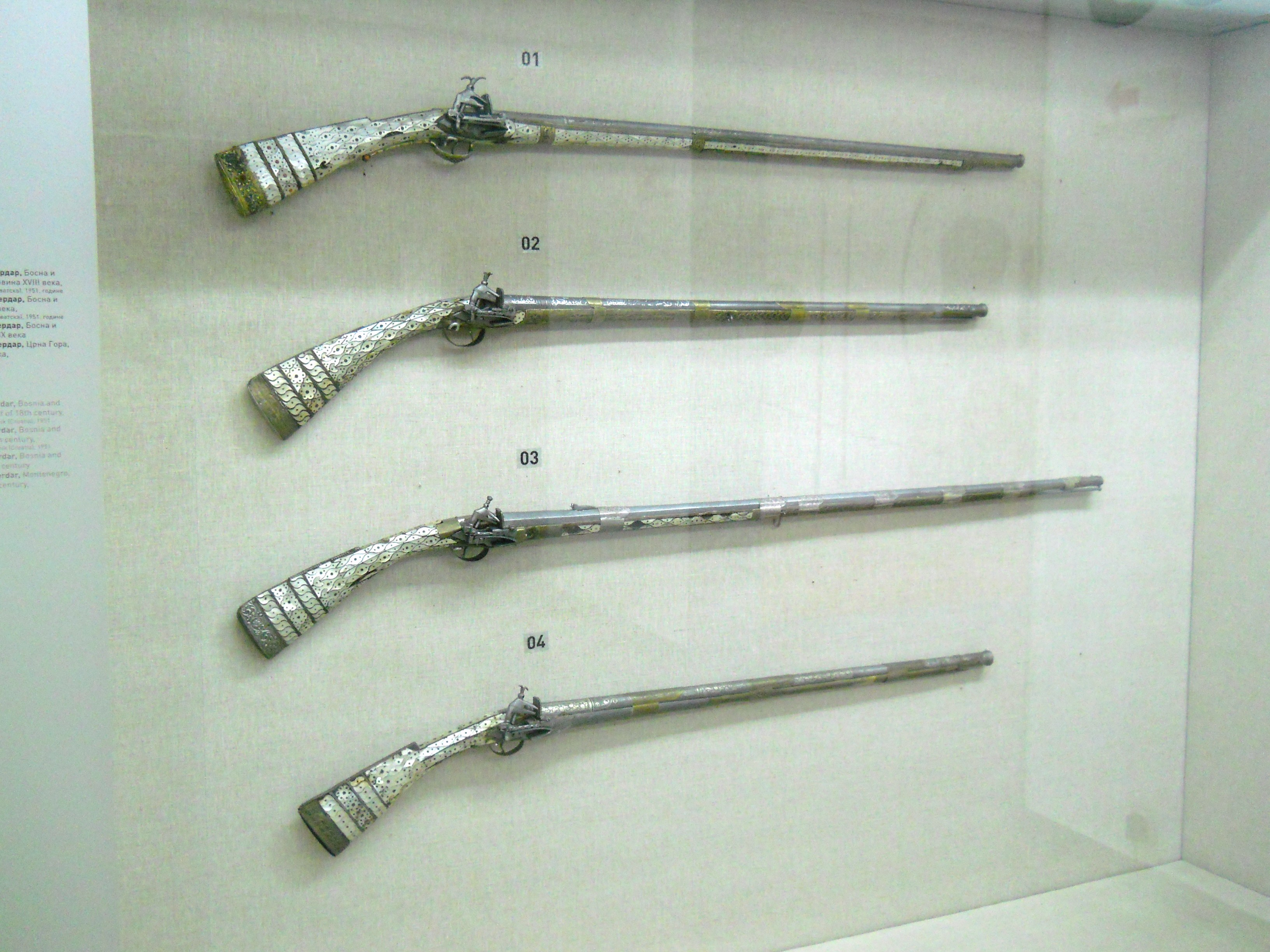
Dzeferdar

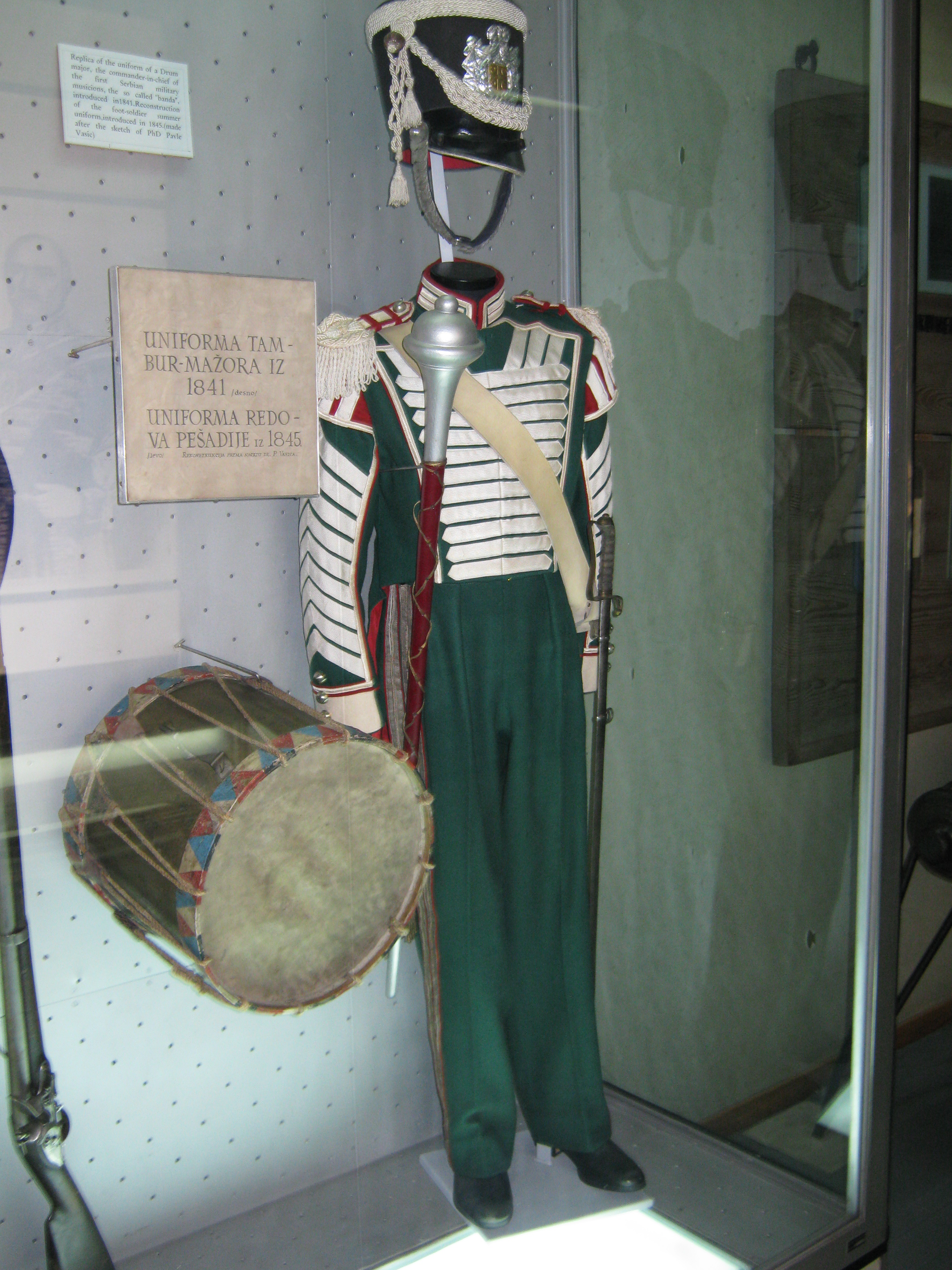
Uniform belongs to Tambur-Mažor of Serbian Army from 1841

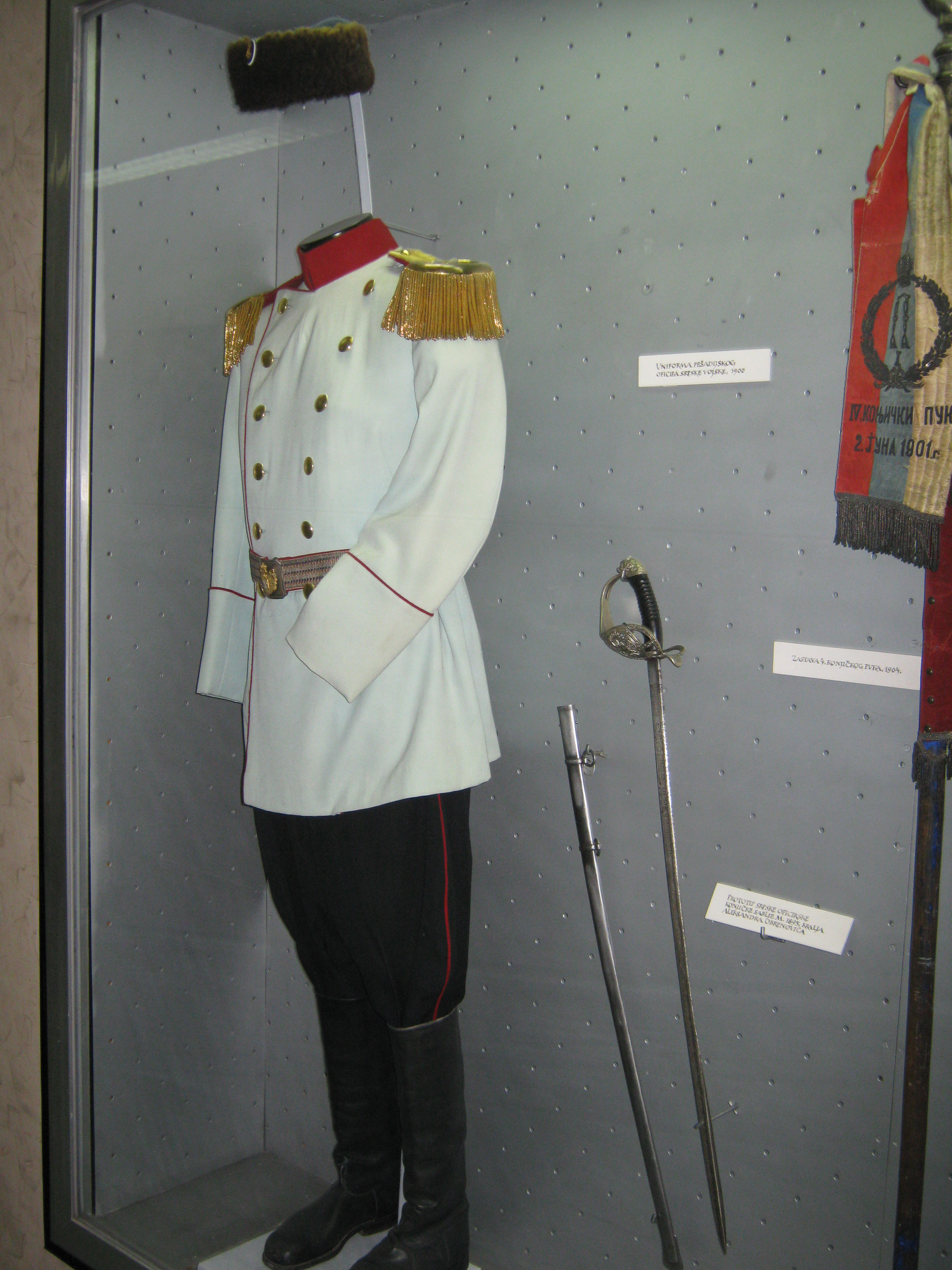
Uniform of Serbian officer 1900

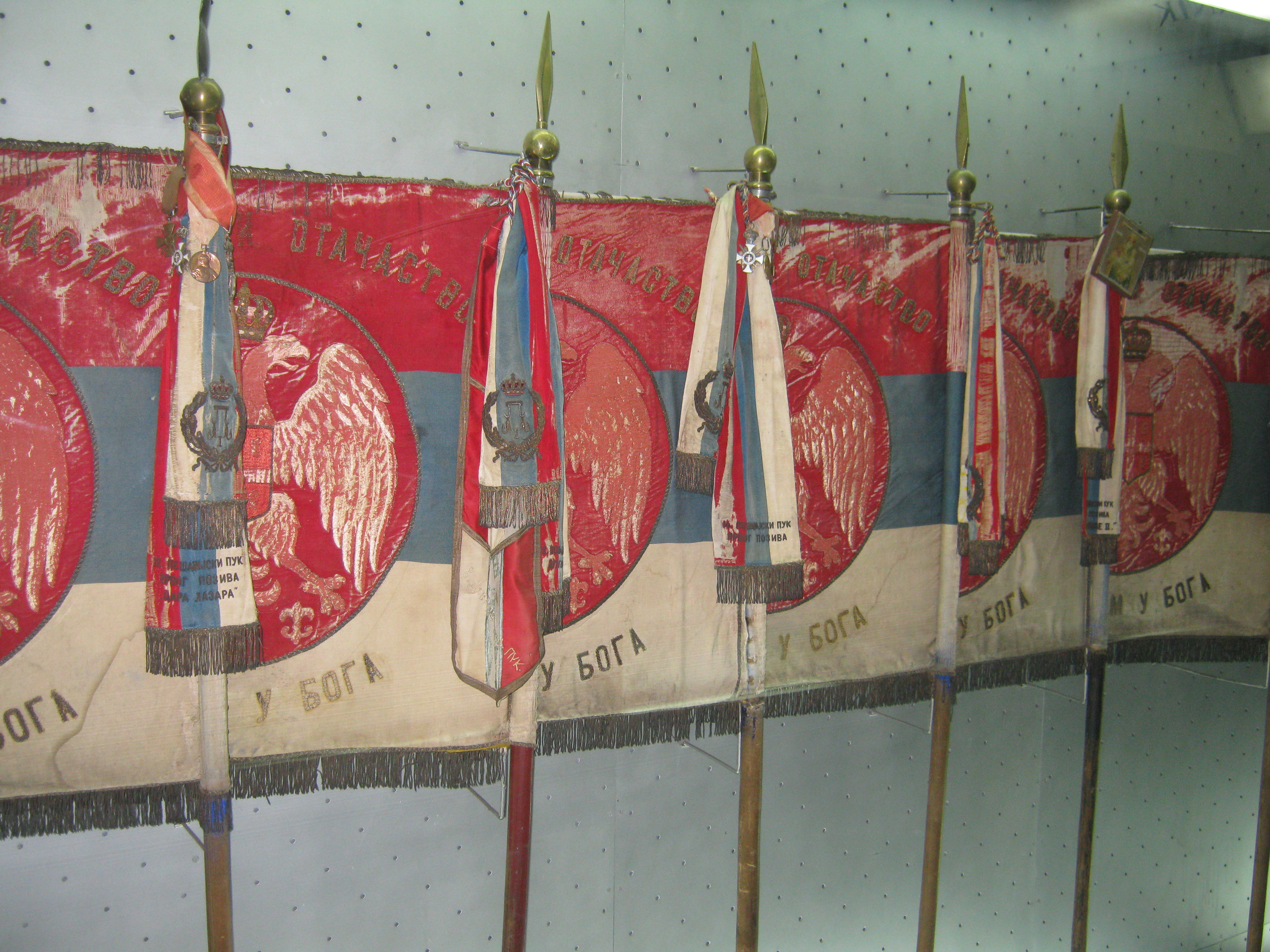
Serbian WWI flags

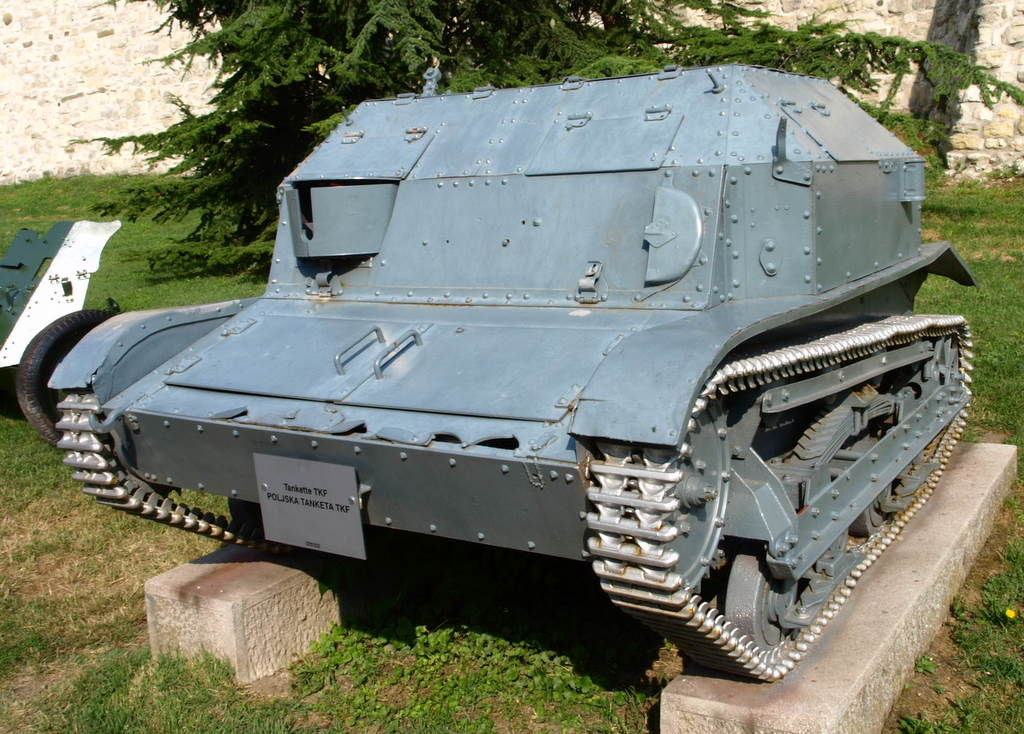
Polish TKF tankette

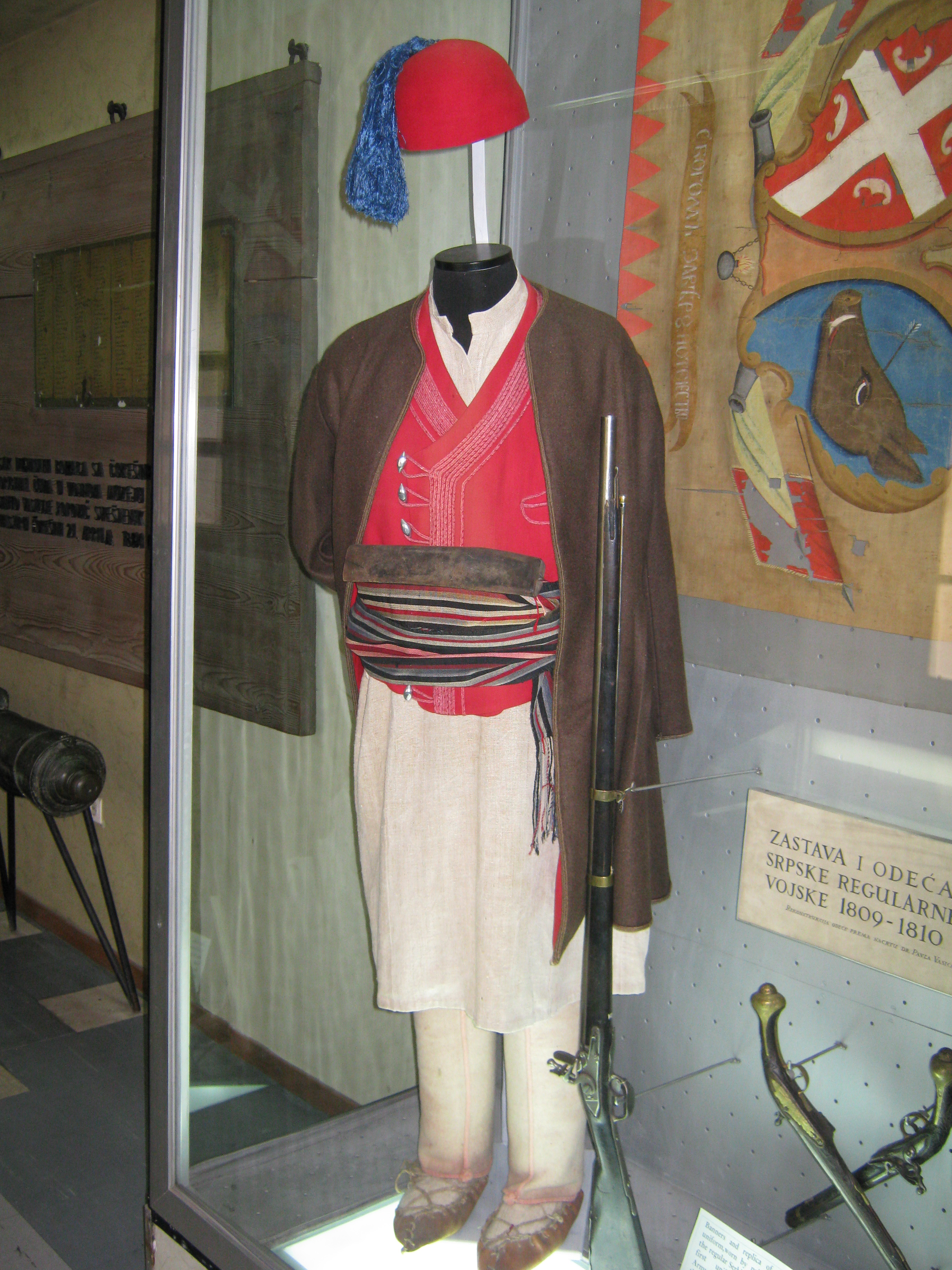
Uniform of a private in the Serbian Revolutionary Army of 1804.

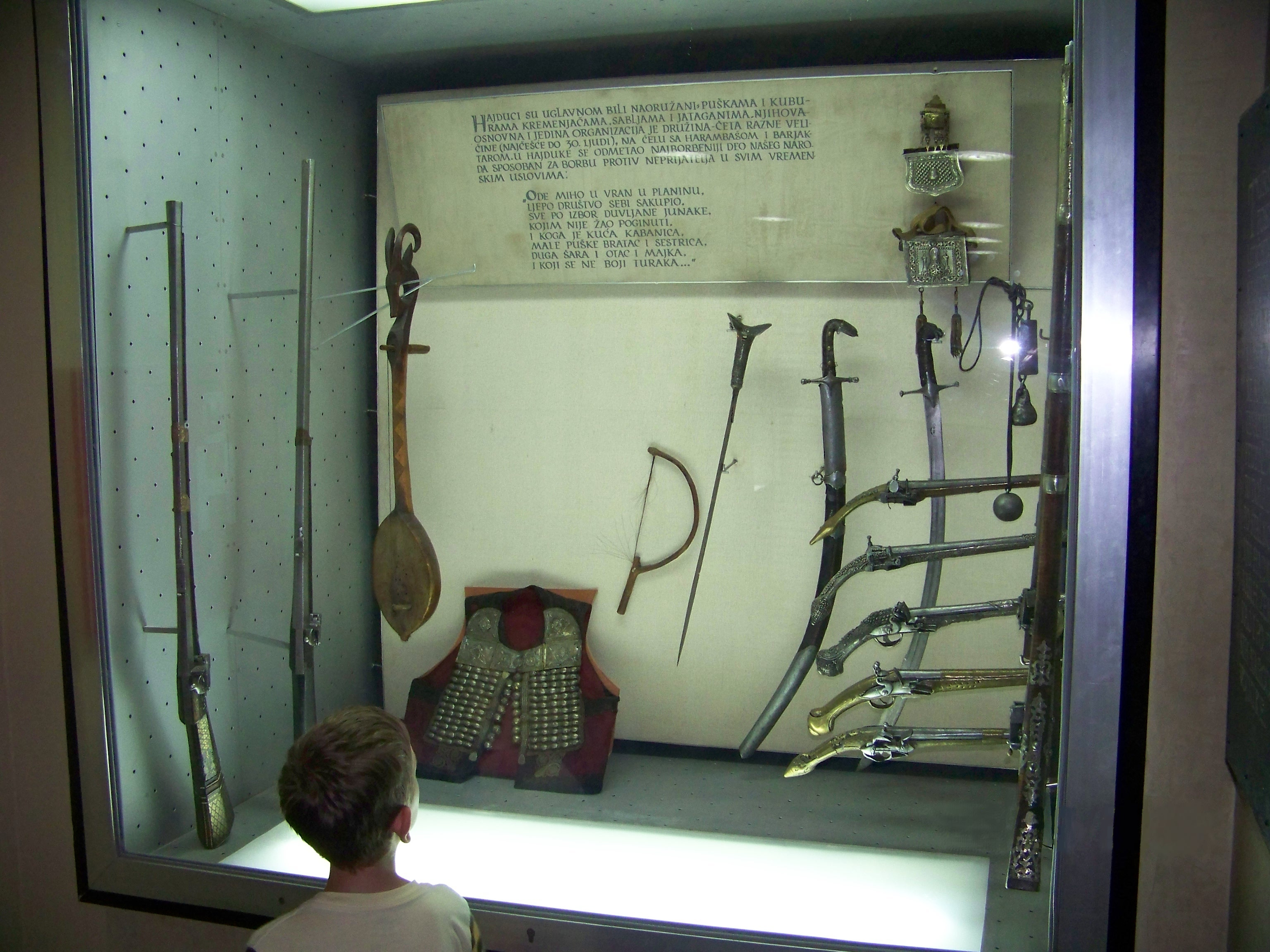
Hajduk weapons

== See also ==
- List of museums in Serbia
