= Speak =

Speak or SPEAK may refer to:

- Speech, the vocal form of human communication

== People ==
- Speak (Hungarian rapper) (born 1976), known for his song and music video "Stop the War"
- Speak! (born 1987), American rapper and songwriter
- Geoffrey Lowrey Speak (1924–2000), British teacher in Hong Kong
- George Speak, English footballer

== Literature and film ==
- Speak (Anderson novel), a 1999 novel by Laurie Halse Anderson
  - Speak (2004 film), the film based on Anderson's book
- Speak (Hall novel), a novel by Louisa Hall
- Speak (2025 film), a documentary about participants in high school speech and debate competitions

== Music ==
- Speak (band), a synthpop band from Austin, Texas
- Speak (American rapper), American rapper and songwriter
- Speak (Hungarian rapper), known for his 2003 single "Stop the War"
- Speak (Jimmy Needham album), 2006
- Speak (Lindsay Lohan album), the debut album by the actress Lindsay Lohan
- Speak (Londonbeat album), the debut album by the British-American dance band Londonbeat, 1988
- Speak (I and Thou album), 2012
- Speak (No-Man album), a compilation album by No-Man
- Speak (The Roches album), 1989
- Speak!!!!, an album by The Mad Capsule Markets
- "Speak" (Bachelor Girl song), a 2018 single by Australian pop band Bachelor Girl
- "Speak" (Godsmack song), a 2006 song by the band Godsmack
- Speak, a 2018 album by Warren Dean Flandez
- "Speak", a song by Nickel Creek from This Side
- "Speak", a song by Queensrÿche from Operation: Mindcrime
- "Speak", a song by Sevendust from Sevendust
- "Speak", a song by Swans from Swans

== Organizations ==
- SPEAK campaign, an animal rights campaign in Oxford
- SPEAK network, a Christian student campaigning network

== Other ==
- Speak (talk show), American sports talk show
- SPEAK (test), the Speaking Proficiency English Assessment Kit from the Educational Testing Service
- Speak (The Tick), the pet of comic superhero The Tick
- Speak (Unix), a Unix utility
- Speak (imprint), young adult division of the publishing company the Penguin Group
- Wii Speak, a microphone accessory for Nintendo's Wii video game console

== See also ==
- Speech (disambiguation)
- Speke (disambiguation)
- Spic (disambiguation)
