= Tamás Deák =

Tamás Deák may refer to:

- Tamás Deák (composer) (1928–2024), Hungarian composer and conductor
- Speak (Hungarian rapper) (Tamás Deák; born 1976), Hungarian rap artist, model and actor
