= Spähpanzer Ru 251 =

- Type: Light tank
- Place of origin: Germany

Production history
- Designer: Hanomag
- Designed: 1960-1964
- Manufacturer: Henschel
- Produced: 1963-1964
- No. built: 2

Specifications
- Mass: 25.3 tons
- Length: 6.2 m (20 ft 4 in)
- Width: 3 m (9 ft 10 in)
- Height: 2.49 m (8 ft 2 in)
- Crew: 4 (commander, gunner, driver, loader)
- Armor: 30 mm MAX
- Main armament: 1 × 90 mm Rheinmetall BK 90/L40
- Secondary armament: 1 x MG 3A1
- Engine: Daimler-Benz MB 837 A 630 hp
- Power/weight: 25 PS (hp)/tonne
- Suspension: Hydropneumatic suspension
- Ground clearance: 400 mm
- Maximum speed: 80 km/h (50 mph)

The Spähpanzer Ru 251 is a German light tank based on the Kanonenjagdpanzer tank destroyer. It was proposed to replace the M41 Walker Bulldog.

== History ==
The Ru 251 was one of the projects created by the Bundeswehr during the Cold War. In this connection, a new project began—the Europanzer, which led to the creation of the Leopard 1 for the West Germany or the AMX-30 for France.

In the early 1960s, the Bundeswehr still used American M41s as reconnaissance tanks. In 1960, a program was launched to develop a new light reconnaissance tank. Prototypes were built in 1963 and 1964.

== Design ==
The Ru 251 is based on the Kanonenjagdpanzer tank destroyer and uses the same 90 mm Rheinmetall BK 90/L40 main cannon.

The Ru 251 had remarkable mobility and firepower with its 650 hp Daimler-Benz MB 837 A engine and its Rheinmetall BK 90/L40 90mm cannon, but had no significant anti-tank shell protection. In 1964, the Ru 251 prototype underwent intensive operational trials, but at the same time the Leopard 1 main battle tank with its 105 mm cannon was prepared for series production.

== See also ==
- Spähpanzer SP I.C.
