= Spic (disambiguation) =

Spic is an ethnic slur for a person of Latino/Hispanic descent.

Spic, spik or Špik may also refer to:

- State Power Investment Corporation, a Chinese electricity generator
- Špik, a mountain in Slovenia
- Luka Špik (born 1979), a Slovenian rower
- SPIC MACAY, the Society for the Promotion of Indian Classical Music And Culture Amongst Youth
- Spic and Span, a U.S. household cleanser
- Grind og spik, a whale meat and blubber dish of the Faroe Islands
- Spähpanzer SP I.C., a 1956 West German tank
- Student Pilot In Command, a student pilot under supervision

== See also ==
- Lee Spick, an English snooker player
