= Speech (disambiguation) =

Speech is the vocal form of human communication.

Speech or speaking

- Spoken language
- Discourse
- Animal language, forms of animal communication that are considered to show similarities to human language
  - Talking animal or speaking animal, any non-human animal which produces sounds or gestures resembling those of a human
- Connected speech in linguistics, a continuous sequence of sounds forming utterances or conversations in spoken language
- Public speaking, a process of speaking to a group of people in a structured, deliberate manner
- Speech imitation, the saying by one individual of the spoken vocalizations made by another individual
- Speech synthesis, the artificial production of human speech language
- Right speech, a component of the Noble Eightfold Path in Buddhism
- Speech (Steamhammer album), 1972
- Speech (Speech album), 1996
- "Speech" (Not Going Out), a 2009 television episode

== People ==
- Speech (rapper) (born 1968), an American rapper and musician
- Speech Debelle (born 1983), a British rapper and Mercury Prize winner

== Other uses ==
- Speech (horse), a racehorse

== See also ==
- The Speech (disambiguation)
- List of speeches
- Speak (disambiguation)
- Speech sound
