= Spähpanzer SP I.C. =

Spähpanzer SP I.C., PT1 & PT2
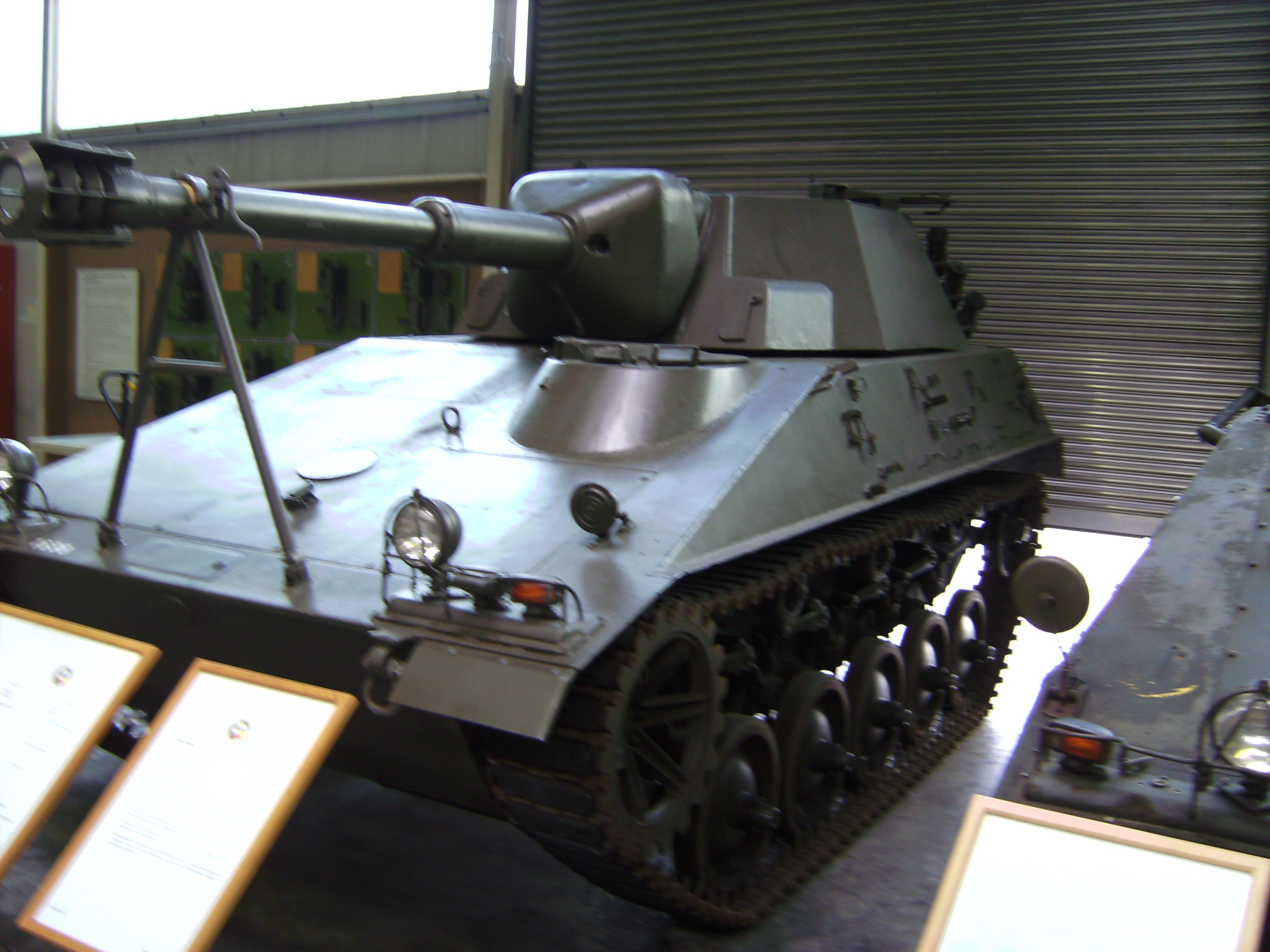
- The Spähpanzer SP I.C. PT2
- Type: Light tank
- Place of origin: West Germany

Service history
- In service: Never saw service

Production history
- Designer: Hotchkiss; Klöckner-Humboldt-Deutz
- Designed: 1956 ~ 1962
- Manufacturer: Hotchkiss; Klöckner-Humboldt-Deutz
- Unit cost: Classified
- Produced: 1962
- No. built: 1

Specifications
- Mass: 8.92 t (8.78 long tons)
- Length: 4.42 m (14 ft 6 in)
- Width: 2.3 m (7 ft 7 in)
- Height: 2.39 m (7 ft 10 in)
- Crew: 3 (commander/gunner, driver, loader)
- Armor: 10–15 mm (0.39–0.59 in)
- Main armament: 1 × 90 mm Mercar (Mecar) or 1 x 90 mm Mercar mit "Mehrladeeinrichtung"; 18 rounds AP and/or HE
- Secondary armament: 1 x MG42 machine gun or coaxial smoke grenade launchers
- Engine: Hotchkiss-Brandt 6-cylinder petrol 195/164/154 PS; 195/164/154 hp
- Power/weight: 30 PS (hp)/tonne
- Suspension: Hydropneumatic; Traverse speeds: PT1=40; PT2=44
- Ground clearance: 400 mm (16 in)
- Fuel capacity: 270 litres; 85 litres reserve
- Maximum speed: 58 km/h (36 mph)

The Spähpanzer SP I.C. (also known as SPIC) (Note: 'SP' is short for Spähpanzer, German for "Scout Tank") was the experimental model of a West German reconnaissance scout light tank with anti-tank components. It was developed from 1956 in order to increase the anti-tank capabilities of reconnaissance tank battalions, but the project eventually declined. There are two blueprint prototype versions of the SP I.C. The single tank built can be seen in the Wehrtechnische Studiensammlung Koblenz.

== Specifications ==
Spähpanzer SP I.C.
Muzzle velocity	AP: 630 m/s (2,067 ft/s); HE: 338 m/s (1,109 ft/s)
Maximum ammunition load	18

== See also ==
- Spähpanzer Ru 251
- Spähpanzer Luchs
- Tanks in the Cold War
