= Tanks in the Cold War =

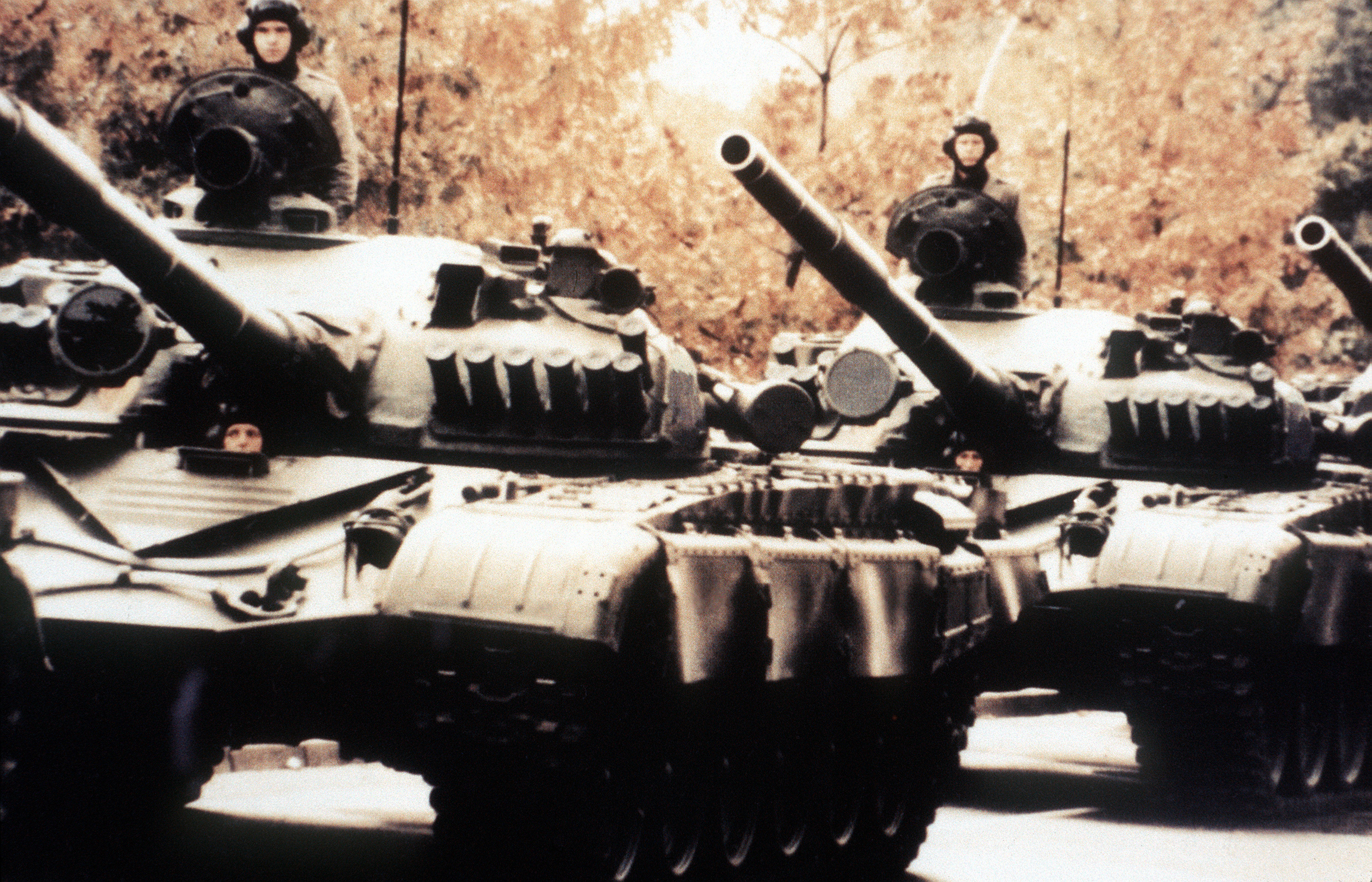
Soviet convoy of T-72 main battle tanks.

Tank development both evolved considerably from World War II and played a key role during the Cold War (1947–1991). The period pitted the nations of the Eastern Bloc (organized under the Warsaw Pact in 1955) and the North Atlantic Treaty Organization (NATO) (since 1949) against each other.

After World War II, tank design budgets were cut and engineering staff was often scattered. Many war planners believed that with the advent of nuclear weapons the tank was obsolete, given that a tactical nuclear weapon could destroy any brigade or regiment, whether it was armoured or not.

In spite of this, tanks would not only continue to be produced in huge numbers, but the technology advanced dramatically as well. Tanks became larger and advances in armour made it much more effective. Aspects of gun technology changed significantly as well, with advances in shell design and terminal effectiveness.

Soviet domination of the Warsaw Pact led to effective standardization on a few tank designs. Oppositely, the key NATO nations – the US, UK, France, and West Germany – all developed their own tank designs. These had little in common, with smaller NATO nations purchasing or adapting one or more of these designs.

The Korean War proved that tanks were still useful on the battlefield, given the hesitation of the great powers to use nuclear weapons. In the 1950s, many nations' tanks were equipped with NBC (nuclear, biologic, and chemical) protection, allowing mechanized units to defend against all three types of weapon, or to conduct breakthroughs by exploiting battlefield nuclear strikes.

The decades since have seen continual improvements in tank design, but no fundamental change. Among these have been larger yet guns, correspondingly improved armor systems, and refinements to targeting and ranging (fire control), gun stabilisation, communications and crew comfort.

== Transition to main battle tanks ==
During and after World War II some medium tanks designs, such as the American M26 and Soviet T-44, were mass produced before the concept of a main battle tank idea had evolved. These were highly similar to early main battle tanks, with powerful guns, moderate armor, and decent mobility. Their successors, the M46 Patton and T-54, followed suit before the main battle tank doctrine was fully accepted.

== Development of the main battle tank ==
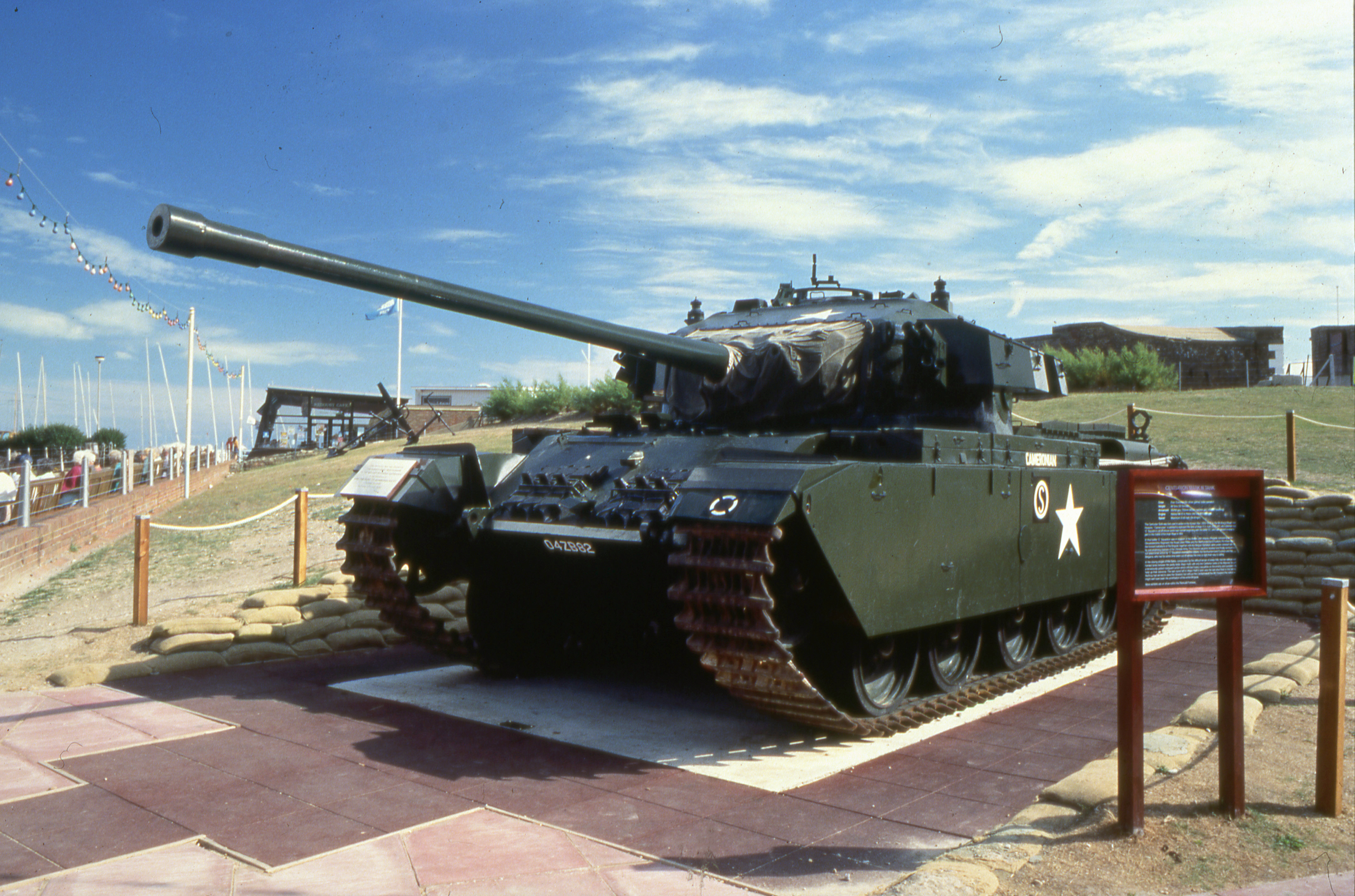
British Centurion Mk 3, a first generation main battle tank at Eastbourne Redoubt

Medium tanks gradually evolved into the new concept of the main battle tank. This transition happened gradually in the 1950s, as it was realized that medium tanks could carry guns (such as the US 90 mm gun, Soviet 100mm D-10 tank gun, and especially the British L7 105 mm gun) that could penetrate any practical level of armour at long range. The World War II concept of heavy tanks, armed with the most powerful guns and heaviest armour, became obsolete since they were just as vulnerable as other vehicles to the new medium tanks. Likewise, World War II had shown that lightly armed, lightly armoured tanks were of little value in most roles. Even reconnaissance vehicles had shown a trend towards heavier weight and greater firepower during World War II; speed was not a substitute for armor and firepower.

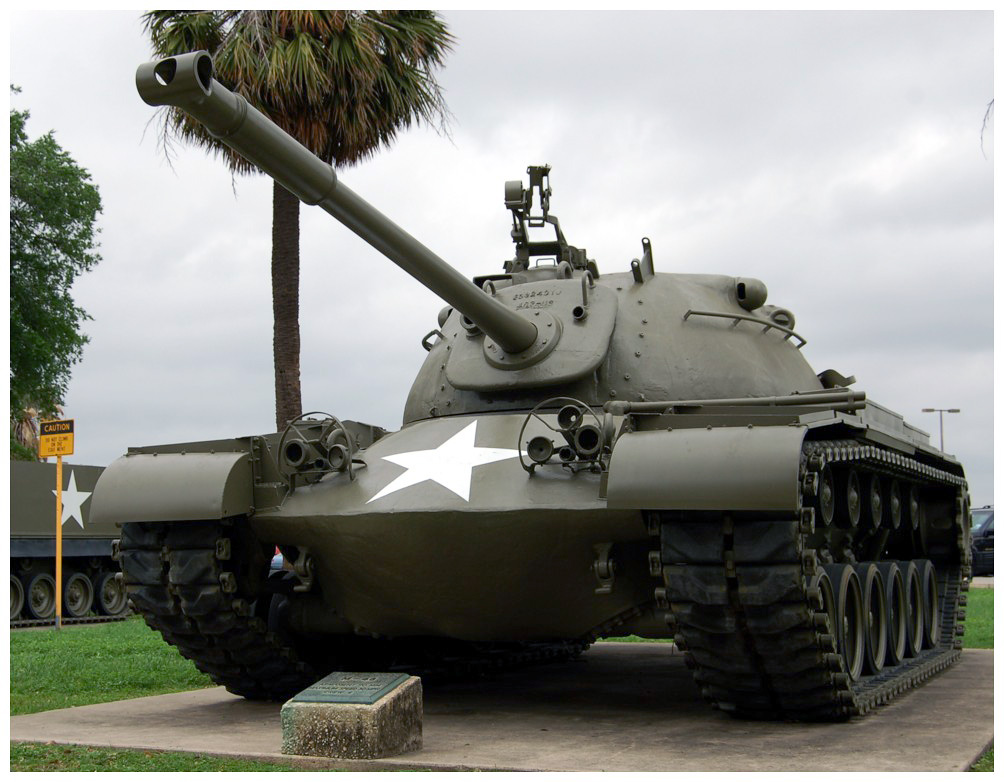
A U.S. M48 Patton

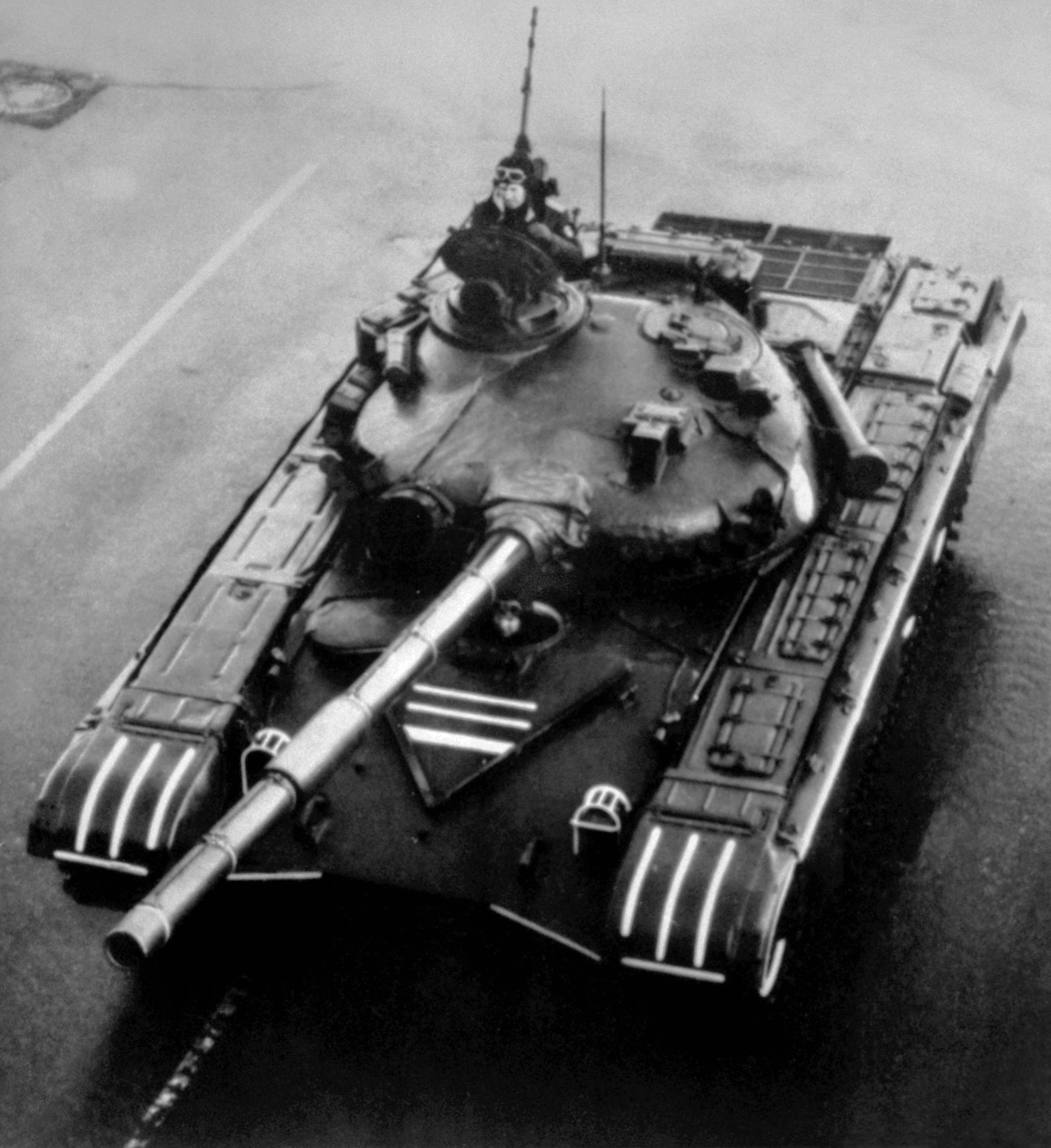
T-72A with thick "Dolly Parton" composite armor on the turret front

An increasing variety of anti-tank weapons and the perceived threat of a nuclear war prioritized the need for additional armor. The additional armour prompted the design of even more powerful guns. The main battle tank thus took on the role the British had once called the 'Universal tank', filling almost all battlefield roles. Typical main battle tanks were well armed and highly mobile, but cheap enough to be built in large numbers. The classic main battle tanks of the 1950s were the British Centurion, the Soviet T-55 series, and the US M46 through the M48 series, which saw continuous updates throughout the Cold war. For example, the Centurion began life with the highly effective 17-pounder (76.2 mm) gun, but was upgraded to 20 pounder (84 mm) and then 105 mm main armament by 1959, with improved fire control and new engines.

The Soviet T-55 started with a 100 mm gun, but has been upgraded with both 115 mm and 125 mm guns, much improved fire control systems, new engines, track, etc. The M46 series evolved through to the M60 series. The first Soviet main battle tank was the T-64 while the first American MBT was the M60 combat tank.

These vehicles and their derivatives formed the bulk of the armoured forces of NATO and the Warsaw Pact throughout the Cold War; many remain in use in the 21st century.

== Light tanks ==
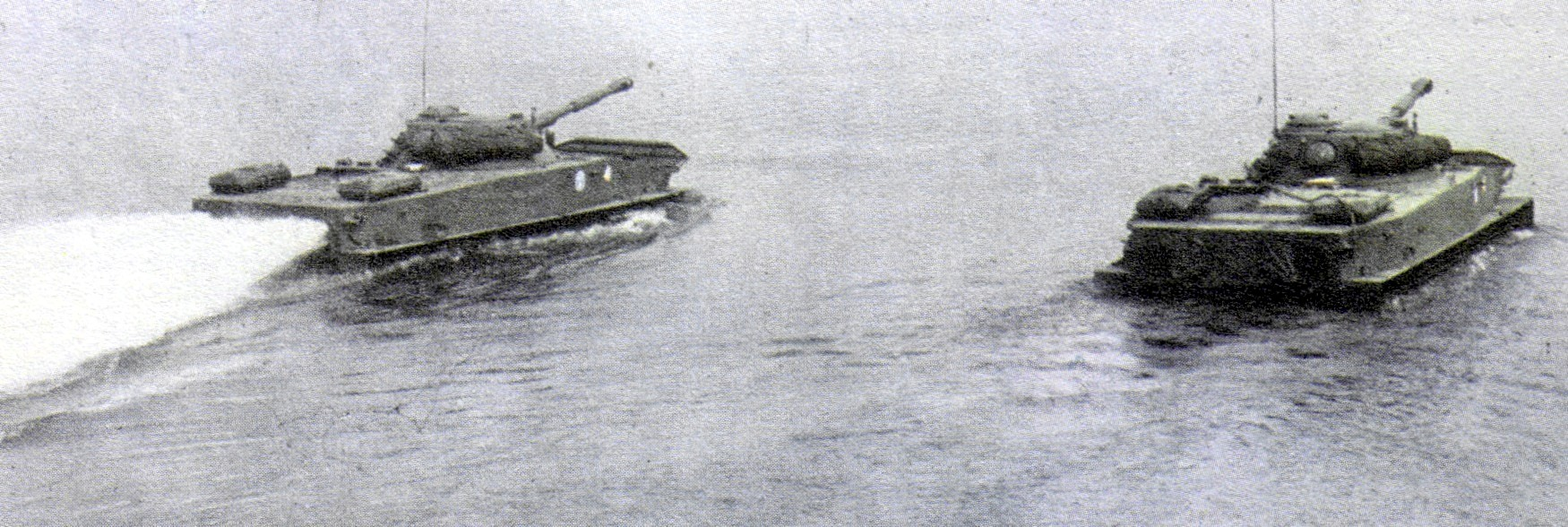
Amphibious Polish PT-76s

Light tanks, such as the Soviet PT-76, maintained limited roles such as amphibious reconnaissance, support of Airborne units, and in rapid intervention forces which were not expected to face enemy tanks. The US M551 Sheridan had similar strengths and weaknesses, but could also be airdropped, either by parachute or LAPES. The value of light tanks for scouting has been diminished greatly by helicopters, although many continued to be fielded. During the early Cold War the US wielded the more conventional M41 Walker Bulldog. From the mid-late Cold War Infantry Fighting Vehicles such as the Soviet BMP and US M2 Bradley to an extent replaced light tanks, being similar to the extent that they are lesser armed and armored but lighter and cheaper than main battle tanks. At the end of the Cold War light tank-like armored cars were designed such as the South African Rooikat and the Italian B1 Centauro which have seen service in the post-Cold War era.

== Heavy tanks ==
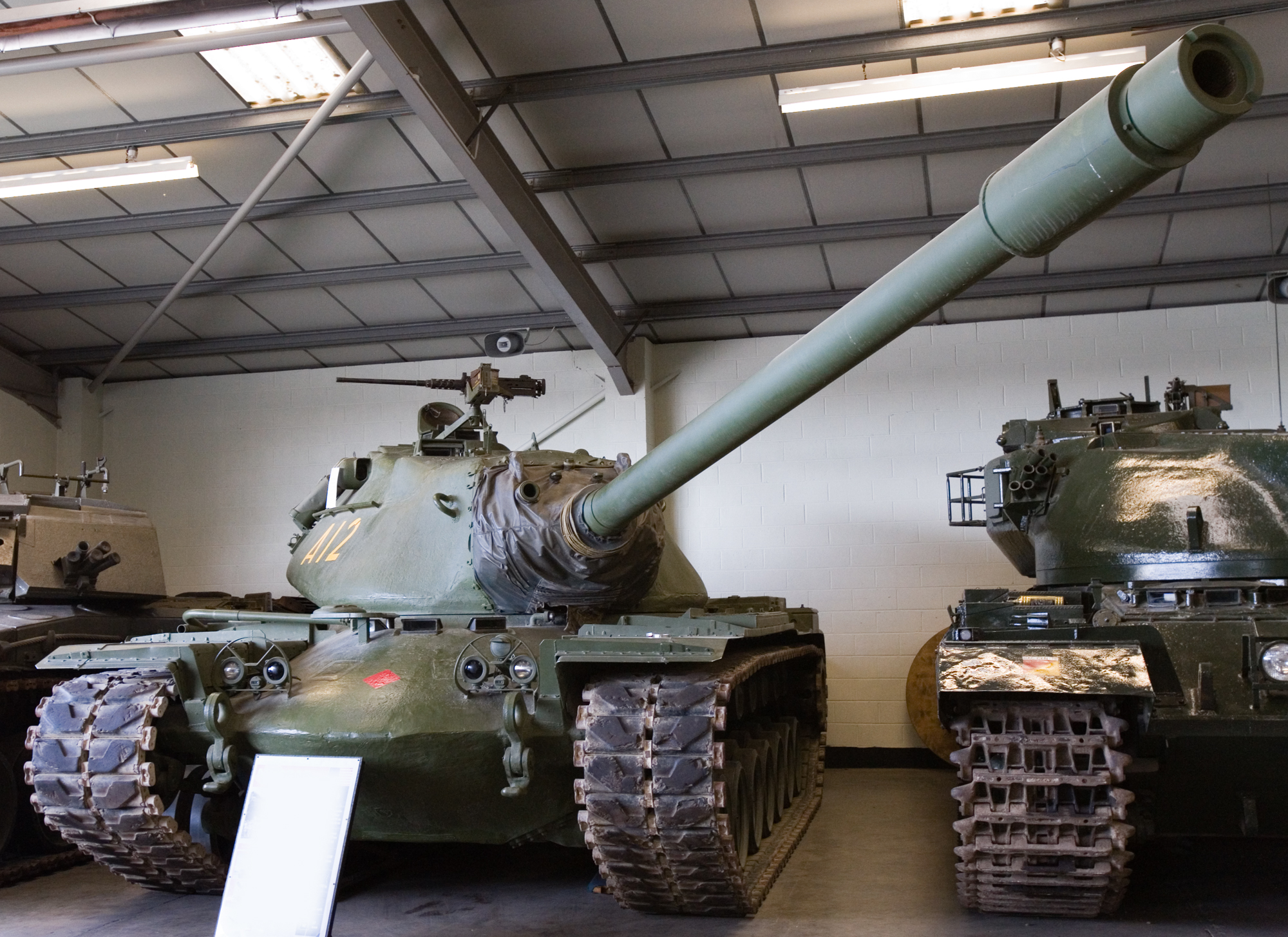
An American M103A2 heavy tank at Bovington tank museum in the UK

Heavy tanks such as the T-10 continued to be developed and fielded along with medium tanks until the 1960s and 1970s, when the development of anti-tank guided missiles and powerful tank guns rendered them ineffective. The combination of large high-explosive anti-tank (HEAT) warheads, with a long effective range relative to a tank gun, and with high accuracy, meant that heavy tanks could no longer function in a stand-off, or overwatch role; much cheaper antitank guided missiles could fill this role as well. Medium tanks were just as vulnerable to the new missiles, but could be fielded in greater numbers and had higher battlefield mobility.

== Development of antitank weapons and countermeasures ==
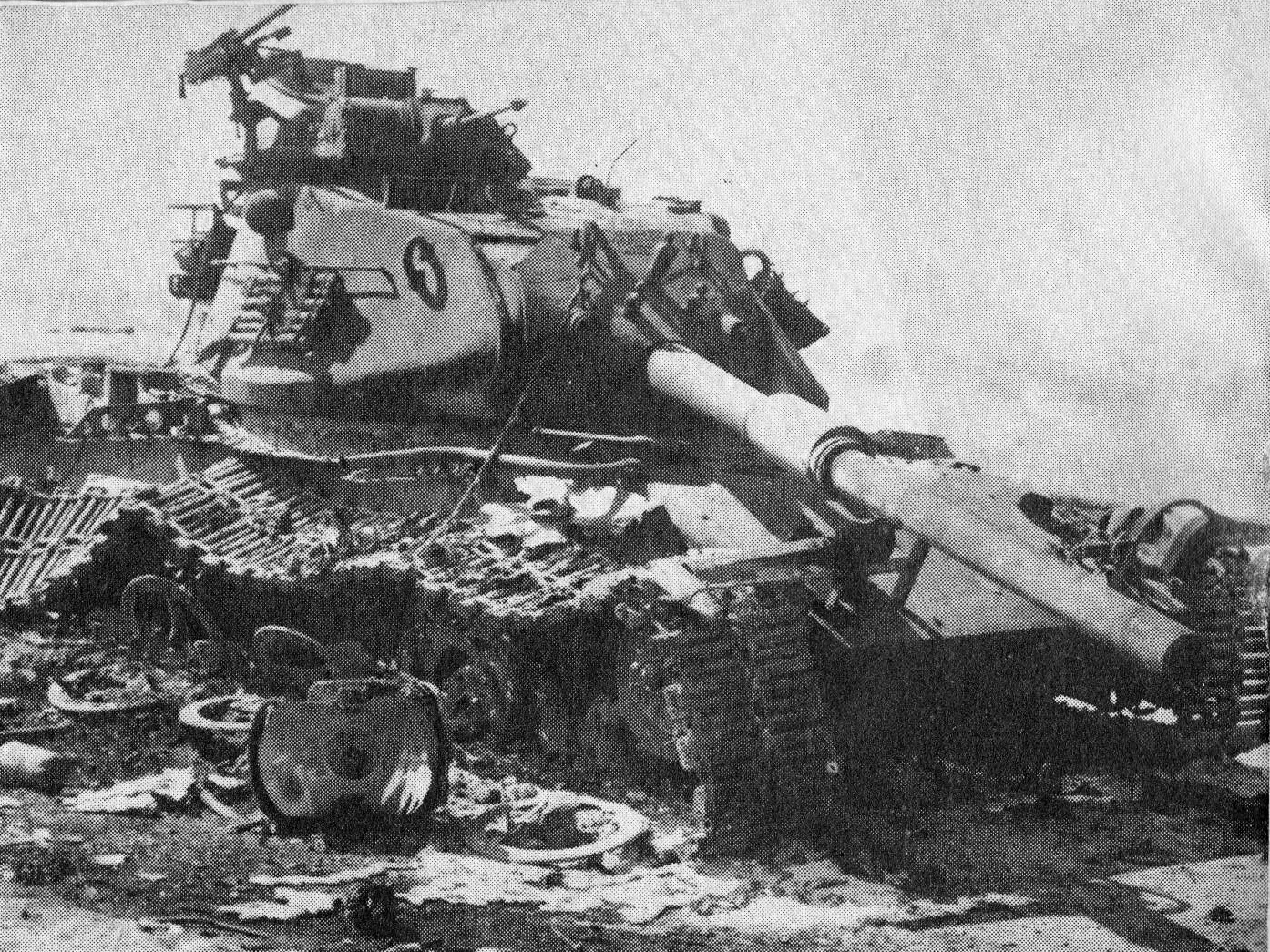
An Israeli M60 tank destroyed in the Yom Kippur War

After the Yom Kippur War of 1973, when Israeli tanks were destroyed in large quantities by man-portable wire-guided missiles (ATGMs) fired by Egyptian infantry, concerns were raised on the vulnerability of tanks on the battlefield to antitank weapons. Subsequent analysis showed that Israeli forces had underestimated their opponents during the first phases of the war; their all-tank tactics ignored the newfound ability of Infantry armed with cheap AT weapons to stop tanks. Tactically, there was renewed recognition for the need for combined-arms tactics. This led to greater mechanization of Infantry and advanced artillery tactics and warheads. Tanks alone were vulnerable to Infantry, but a combined team of tanks, mechanized Infantry, and mechanized artillery could still win in the new environment.

In 1974, the United States initiated a program to modernise its existing tank fleet and start real mass production of the M60A1, and later the M60A3; at the same time the M1 was developed. Budgets for tank design and production picked up during the administration of president Ronald Reagan, following tensions between the United States and the Soviet Union.

In response to infantry-portable and vehicle-mounted ATGMS, ever more capable vehicle armour were developed. Spaced armour, composite, explosive reactive armour, and active protection systems—like the Russian Shtora, Drozd, and Arena—were added to old and new tanks. Despite these improvements the larger missiles remained highly effective against tanks.

== Missile-armed tanks ==
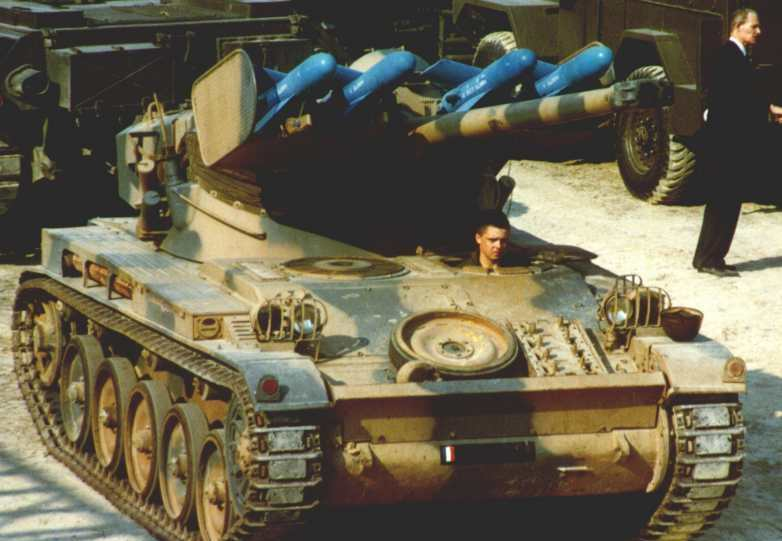
SS.11 anti-tank missile-launcher version of the French AMX-13.

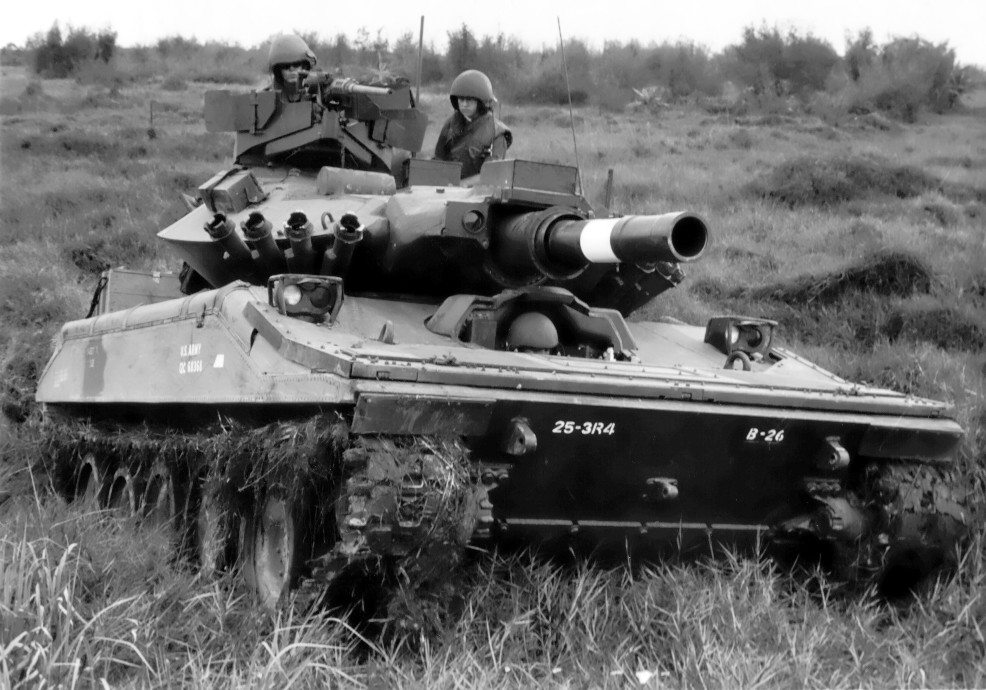
The U.S. M551 Sheridan was an amphibious air-mobile light tank with a 152 mm gun/missile launcher.

During the latter half of the 20th century, some tanks were armed with ATGMs (Anti-Tank Guided Missiles) which could be launched through a smoothbore or (in the case of "Shillelagh") a rifled main gun barrel with a provision to prevent imparting "spin" to the missile. In the U.S., the M60A2, M551 Sheridan, and prototype MBT-70, with 152 mm barrel/launchers used the Shillelagh infrared-guided missile.

During WWII a few tanks designs such as the M4 Sherman were modified to carry unguided rockets on the turret in addition to their main gun. This concept was to a limited extent carried into the Cold War with ATGMs; examples include the French AMX-13 and the Swedish Strv 81 (the Swedish version of the British centurion), both modified to carry SS.11 missiles on the top and sides of the turret, respectively.

The MBT-70 was cancelled prior to production due to high cost, and superseded by the M1 Abrams, which used a conventional gun. The M551 and the M60A2 were widely considered disappointing due to problems of overall complexity, sensitive advanced electrical systems (some components of which involved the Shillelagh guidance system) and issues related to the conventional rounds with combustible cases, though the Sheridan would serve into the 1990s before finally being withdrawn. The M60A2's were eventually replaced by M60A3s using conventional 105 mm guns.

The Soviet Union put gun-launched missiles into service in the mid-1970s, which continue to be used in CIS forces. Tanks capable of firing gun-launched missiles in Russian service include the T-72, T-80, T-90, and upgraded T-55 (T-55AM2). Ukraine also employs missile-armed T-64, T-80, and T-84 tanks.

== History ==
=== Korean War ===
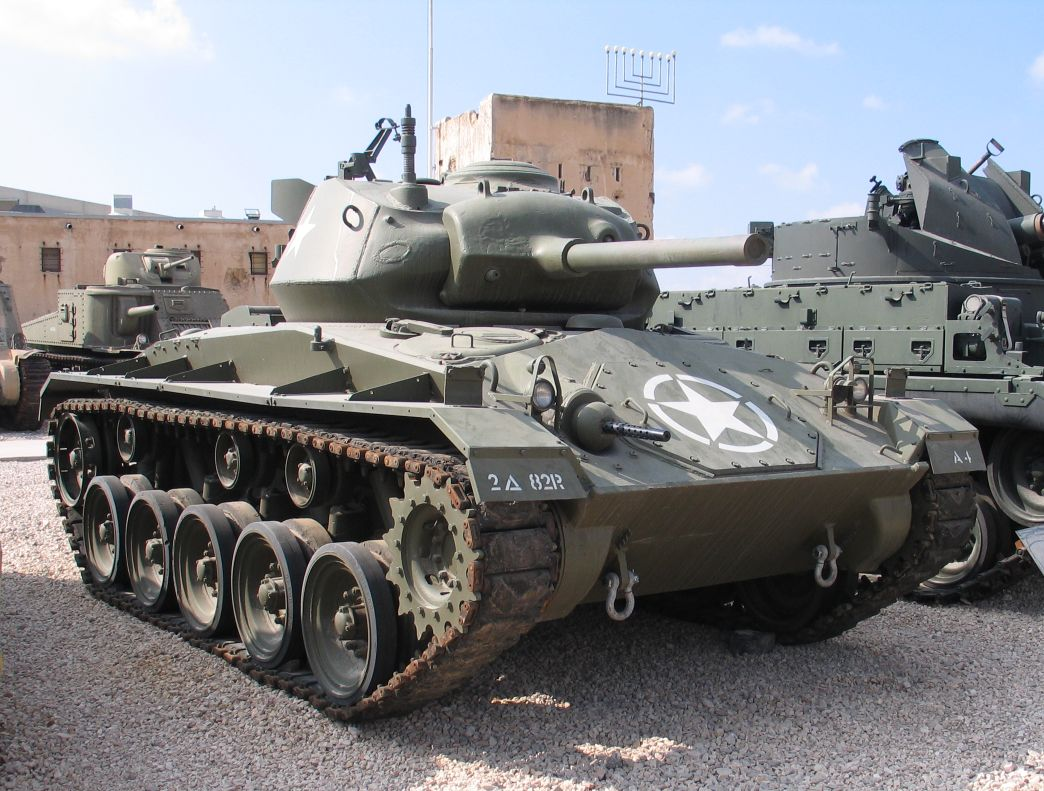
M24 Chaffee light tank

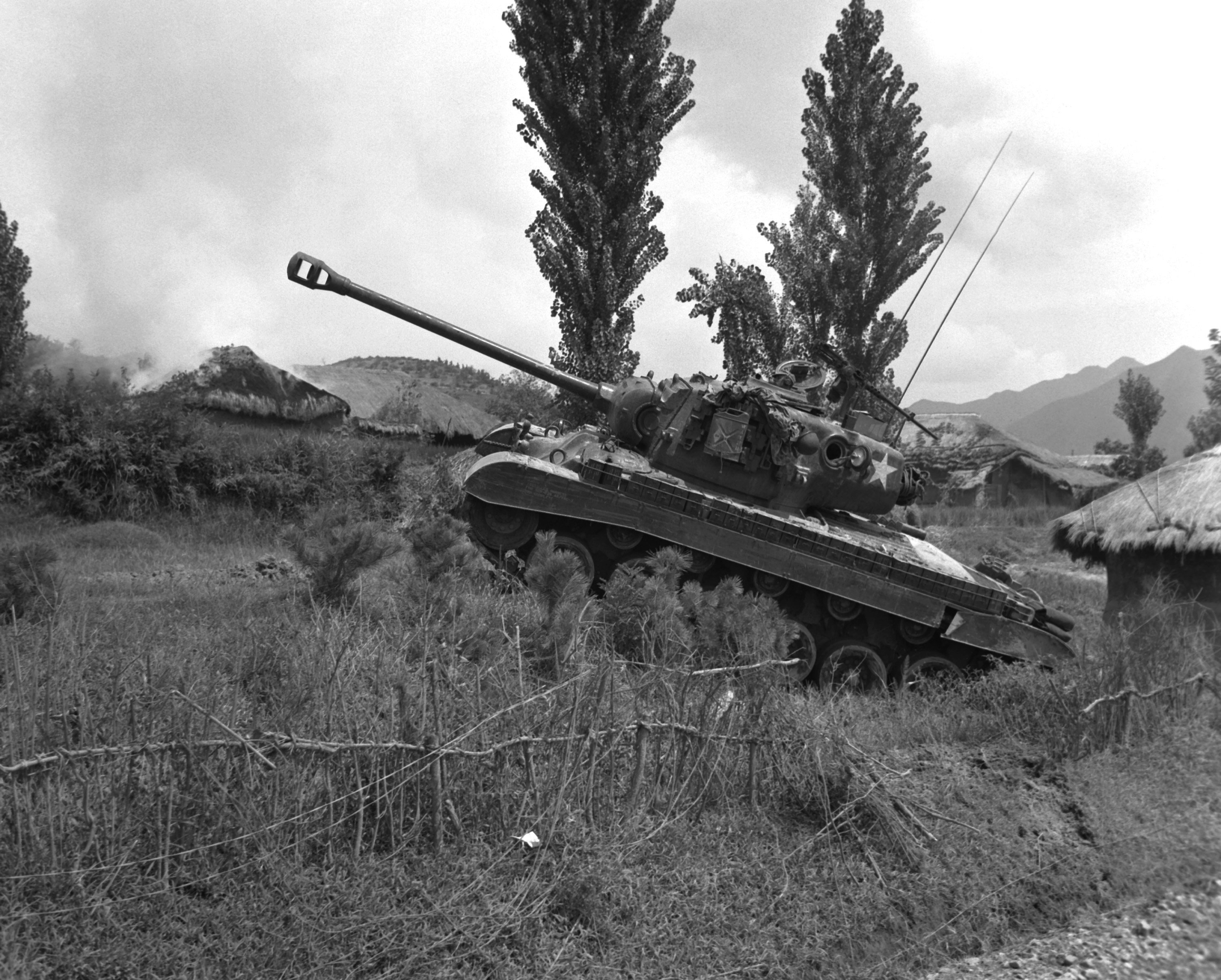
Marine M26 Pershings in Korea

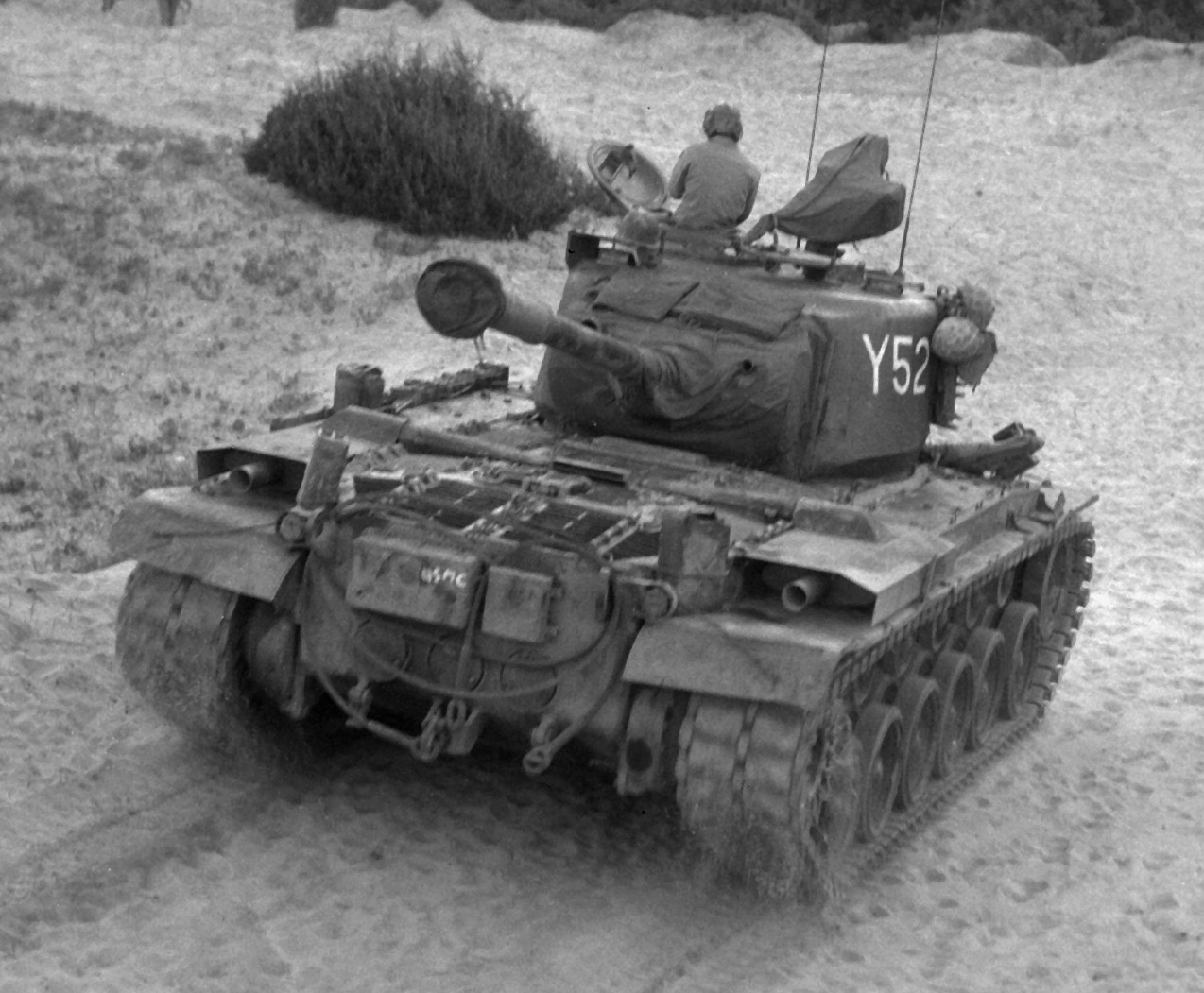
USMC M46 Patton in Korea, July 1952. Note the different rear plate and twin fender-mounted exhausts.

In the Korean War M24 Chaffees were the first U.S. tanks to fight the North Korean T-34-85s. The Chaffee fared poorly against these much better-armed and armored medium tanks. Chaffees were more successful later in the war in their reconnaissance role, supported by heavier tanks such as the M4 Sherman, M26 Pershing, and M46 Patton.

The heavier but older Pershing was deemed unsatisfactory due to its inferior mobility, which was unsuitable for a medium tank role as it used the same engine that powered the much lighter M4 Sherman, and 1949, the upgraded M26 received a new power plant and a main gun with bore evacuator, and the M46 Patton designation. Less than a thousand were upgraded to M46 standard.

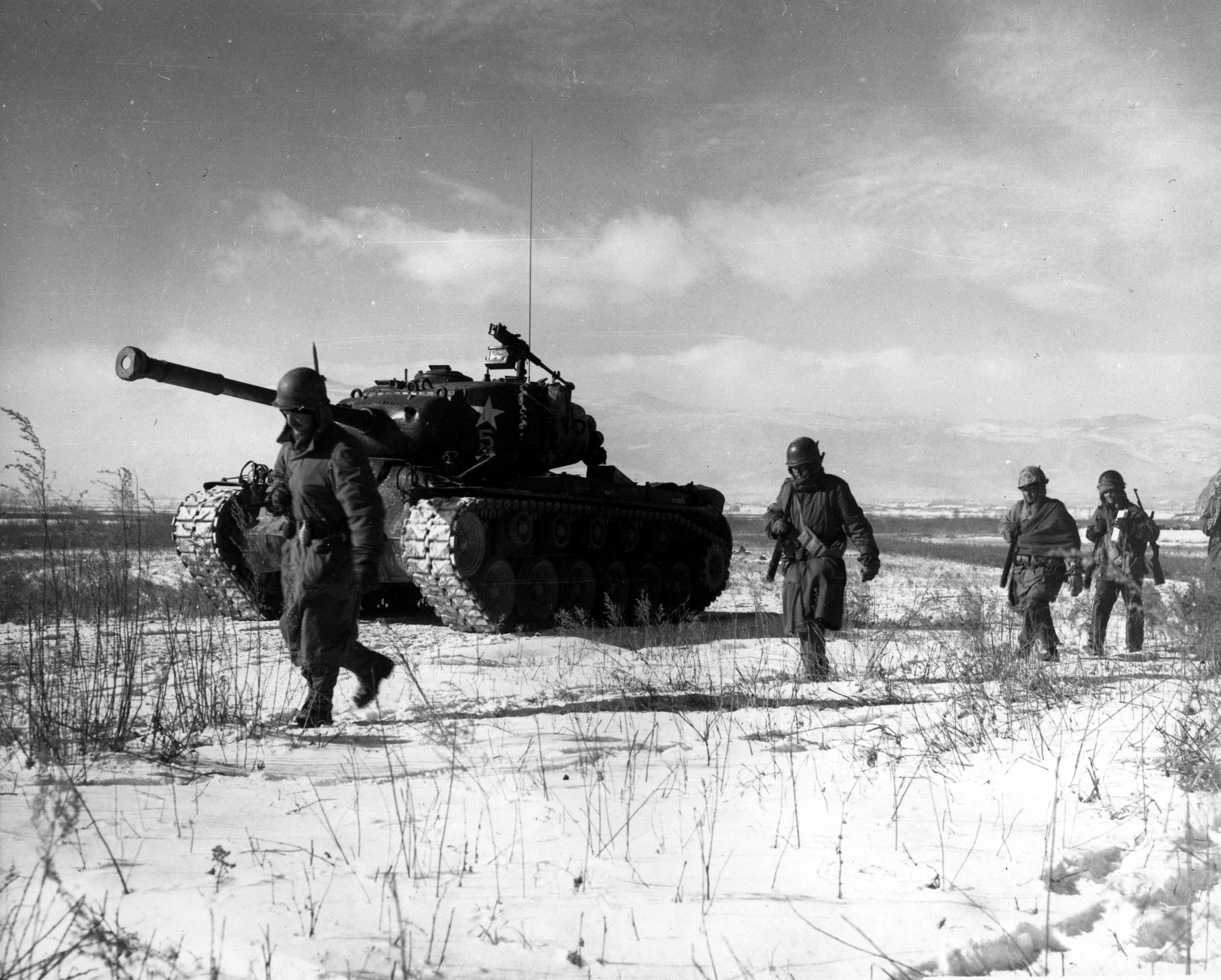
Marines of 1st Marine Division at the Battle of Chosin Reservoir supported by an M46 Patton

On 8 August 1950 the first M46 Pattons landed in South Korea. The tank proved superior to the much lighter North Korean T-34-85, which were encountered in relatively small numbers. By the end of 1950, 200 M46 Pattons had been fielded, forming about 15% of US tank strength in Korea; the balance of 1,326 tanks shipped to Korea during 1950 included 679 M4A3 Shermans, 309 M26 Pershings, and 138 M24 Chaffee light tanks. Subsequent shipments of M46 and M46A1 Pattons allowed all remaining M26 Pershings to be withdrawn during 1951, and most Sherman equipped units were also reequipped.

By 1953 the M24 Chaffees were completely replaced by the M41 Walker Bulldog, which was rushed to the battlefield by the U.S. Army. The Walker Bulldog was too late to see combat during the Korean War.

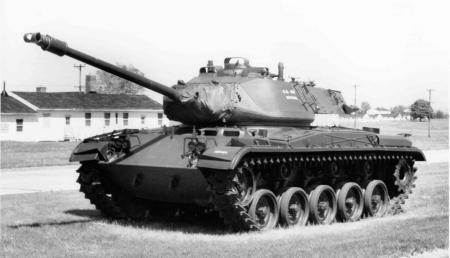
M41 Walker Bulldog light tank

British Centurion tanks, assisted by Cromwells in the reconnaissance role, arrived in Korea in late 1950. The UK tanks had to operate in much colder conditions than their usual deployments on the North German Plain. The Centurions covered the retreat at the battle of the Imjin River with the tanks from C Squadron, 8th Hussars, under the command of Major Henry Huth and by 55 Squadron, Royal Engineers. The British position on the Imjin river "was deemed safe" but vulnerable in case of an attack which prove to be case, and the tanks were able stand their ground in the battle. The Centurions were also in Operation Commando and were used to capture high ground earning praise from the commander of I Corps. Thereafter the war was largely static and the Centurions were used as artillery against the infantry attacks which generally happened at night.

=== Interwar ===
The M47 Patton was intended to replace the M46 Patton and M4 Sherman tanks. It had a 90 mm gun and a crew of 5. Despite it being the primary tank of the US it never saw combat while in US service. In early 1951, the U.S. initiated the design of the M48 Patton, designated the T-48 with a 90 mm gun. The T48 featured a new turret, new redesigned hull and an improved suspension. The hull machine gunner position was removed, reducing the crew to 4. On 2 April 1953, the Ordnance Technical Committee Minutes (OTCM), standardized the last of the Patton series tanks as the M48 Patton.

Nearly 12,000 M48s were built from 1952 to 1959. The early designs, up to the M48A2, were powered by a gasoline 12-cylinder engine which was coupled with an auxiliary 8-cylinder engine. The gas engines gave the tank a short operating range and were prone to catching fire when hit; this version was considered unreliable.

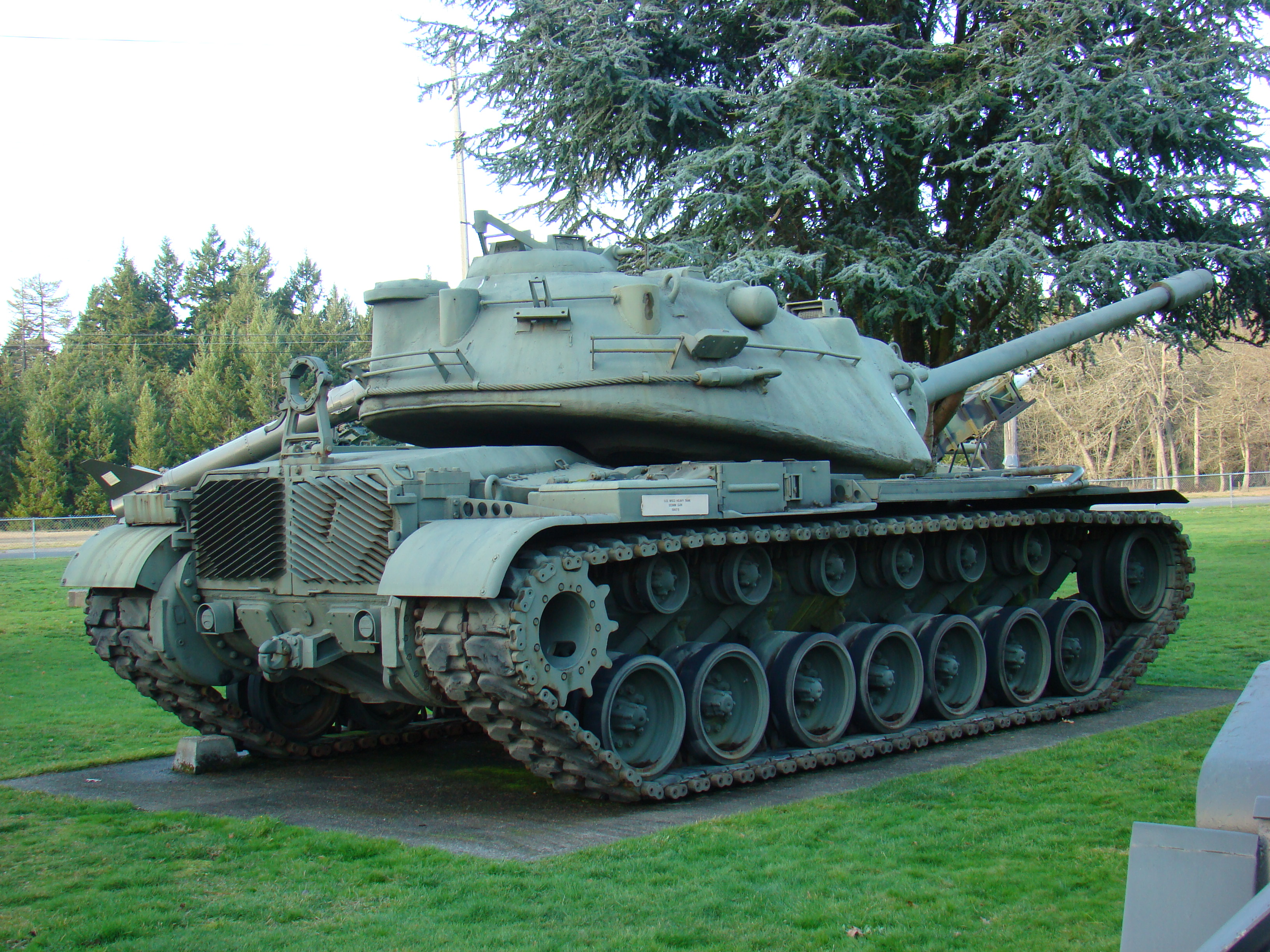
M103 at Ft. Lewis

The M103 heavy tank was manufactured at the Detroit Arsenal Tank Plant and the first units were accepted in 1957.

The M103 was designed to counter Soviet heavy tanks. Its long-ranged 120 mm gun was designed to hit enemy tanks at extreme distances, although it was never used in combat. Of the 300 M103s built, most went to the Marines. The tank was relatively underpowered and the drive systems were fragile. The turret of the M103 was larger than that of the M48 or the M60 to make room for the huge 120 mm gun and the two loaders assigned to it, in addition to the gunner and the commander. The driver sat in the hull. The gun was capable of elevation from +15 to -8 degrees.

The British introduced their Heavy Gun Tank F214 Conqueror with the same 120mm gun as the M103 into service in 1955. It stayed in service until 1960; the upgrading of Centurion tank to the L7 105mm gun having removed its purpose.

While the US Army deactivated its heavy armor units with the reception of the new M60 series main battle tanks in 1960, the remaining M103s stayed within the US Marine Corps inventory until they began receiving the M60 series MBT. With the disappearance of the heavy tank from US forces came the full acceptance of the main battle tank in 1960 for the US Army, and later for the US Marine Corps.

The British successor to Centurion was Chieftain in 1966. Chieftain was heavily armoured and had a 120mm gun following a doctrine of long range fire and survivability that would be needed against the more numerous Warsaw Pact tanks in the event of an invasion of West Germany.

=== Vietnam War era ===
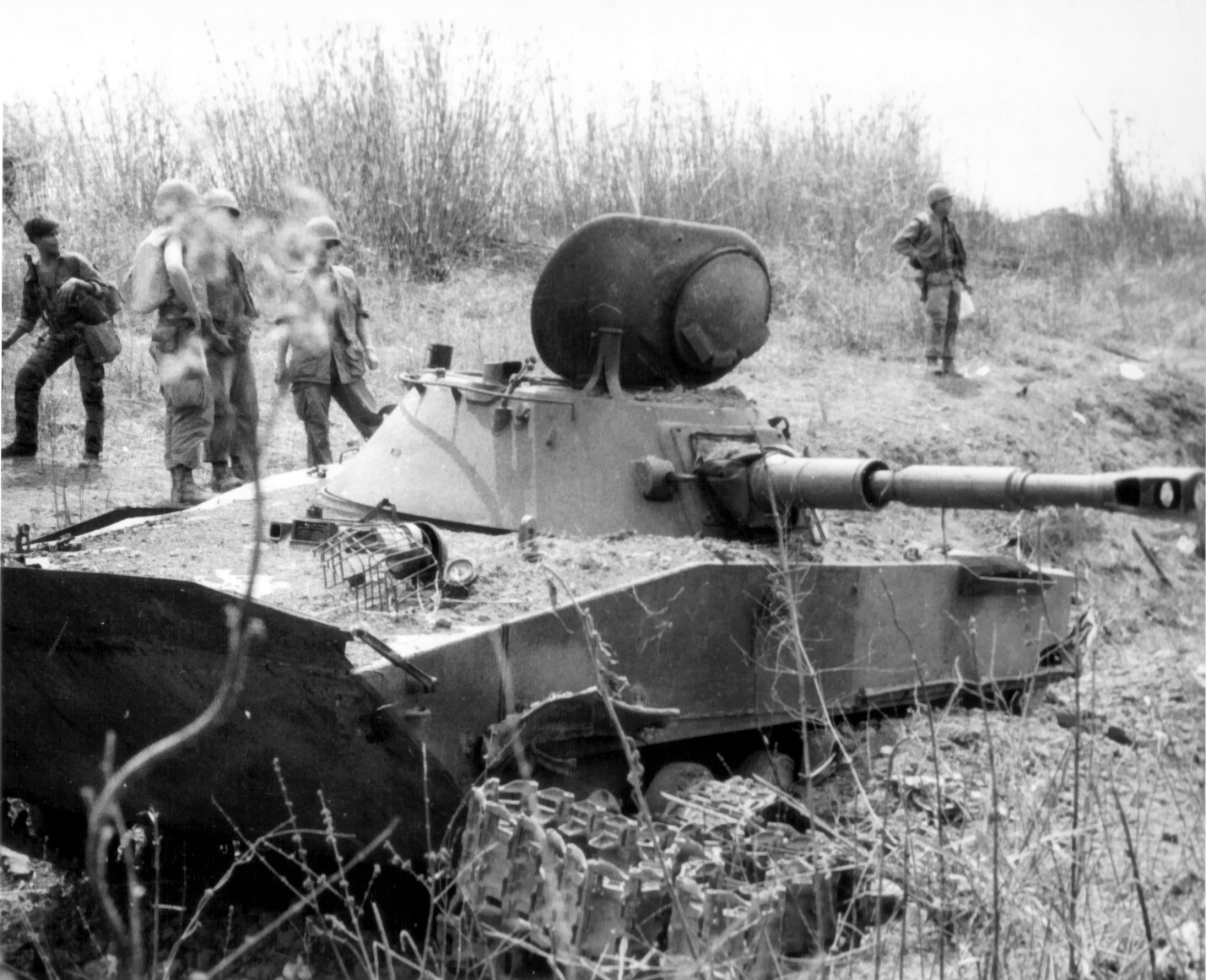
One of two PT-76s from the NVA 202nd Armored Regiment, destroyed by US M48 Pattons, from the 1/69th Armored battalion, during the battle of Ben Het, March 3, 1969, Vietnam.

Tanks for the most part, saw limited action in Vietnam compared to the heavy fighting in Korea, but even in the Vietnam jungle the M48 Patton saw tank-on-tank duels.

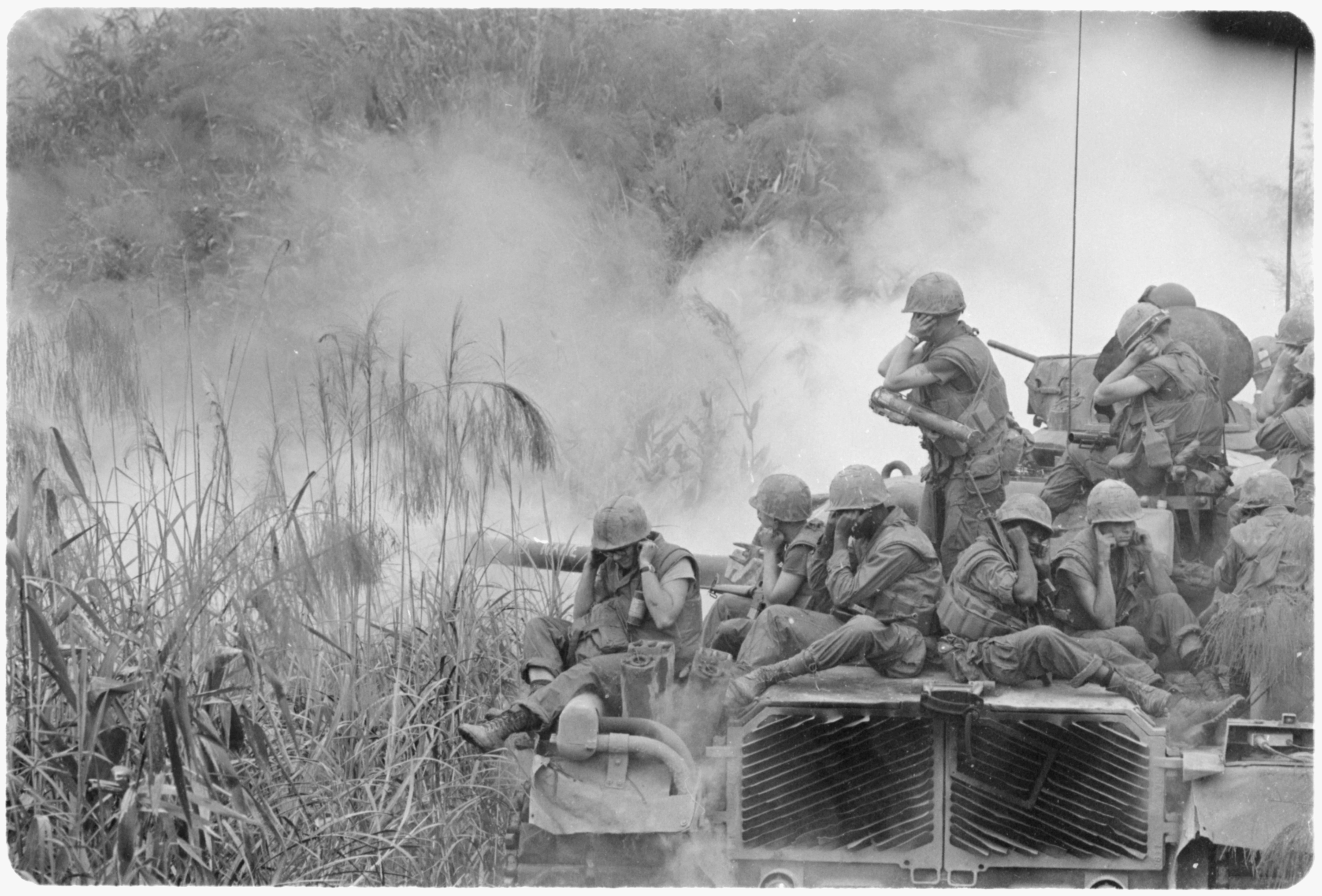
U.S. Marines riding atop an M48 tank, Vietnam, April 1968.

Over 600 Pattons would be deployed with US Forces during the war. The initial M48s landed with the US Marines in 1965. Three U.S. Army battalions also arrived in Southern Vietnam. Each battalion consisted of approximately fifty seven tanks. M48s were also used by Armored Cavalry Squadrons in Vietnam, until replaced by M551 Sheridan tanks. The M67A1 flamethrower tank (nicknamed the Zippo) was an M48 variant used in Vietnam.

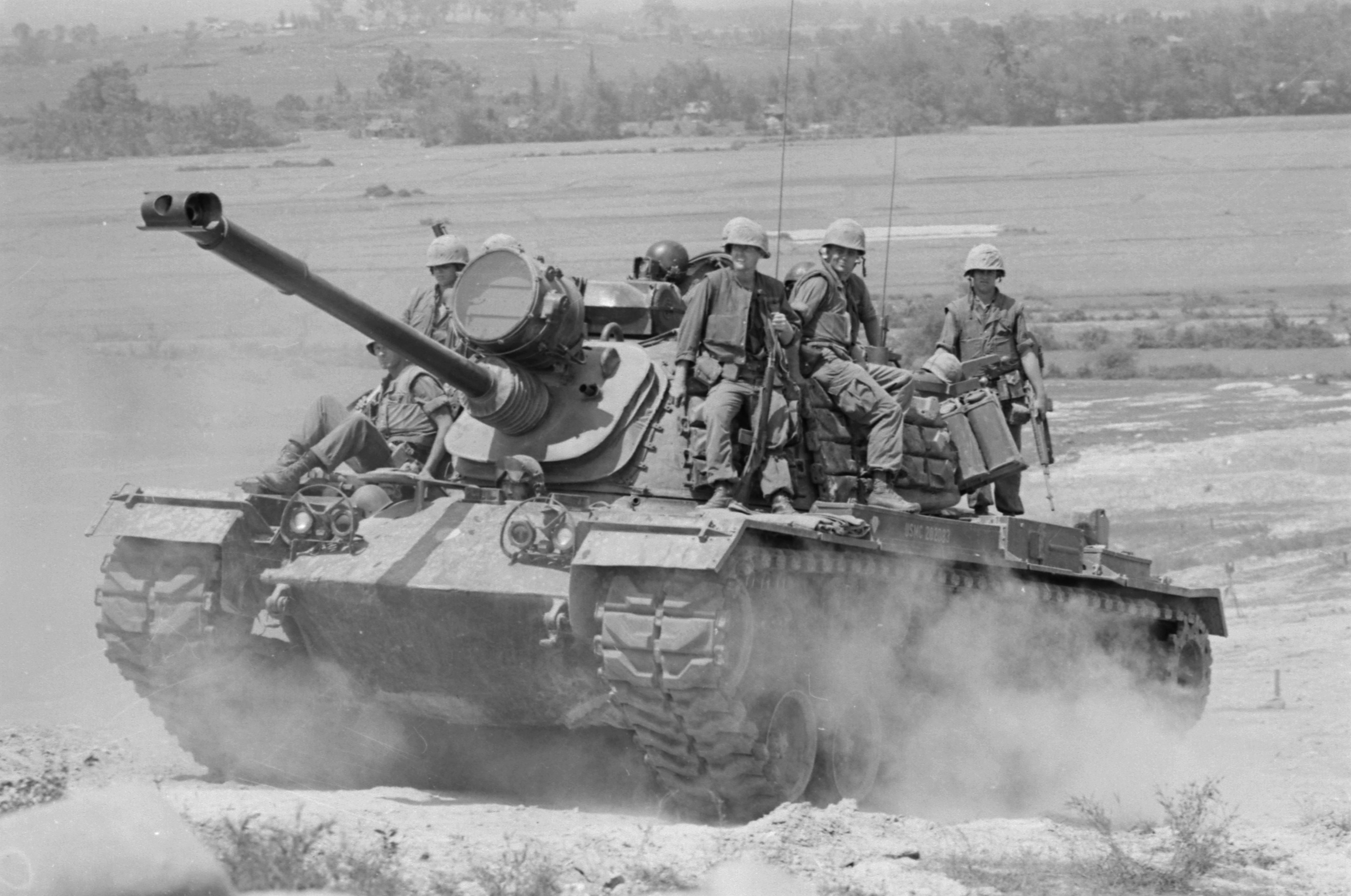
Marines of E Company, 2nd Battalion, 3rd Marines, riding on an M48A3 tank, Vietnam, 1966.

Many of the M48A3 Pattons were turned over to the Army of the Republic of Vietnam (ARVN) forces, in particular creating the ARVN 20th Tank Regiment; which supplemented their M41 Walker Bulldog units. During the North Vietnamese Army (NVA) Easter Offensive in 1972, tank clashes between NVA T-54/PT-76 and ARVN M48/M41 units became commonplace.

The M48s performed admirably in Vietnam in the infantry-support role. However, there were few actual tank versus tank battles. The M48s provided adequate protection for its crew from small arms, mines, and rocket-propelled grenades.

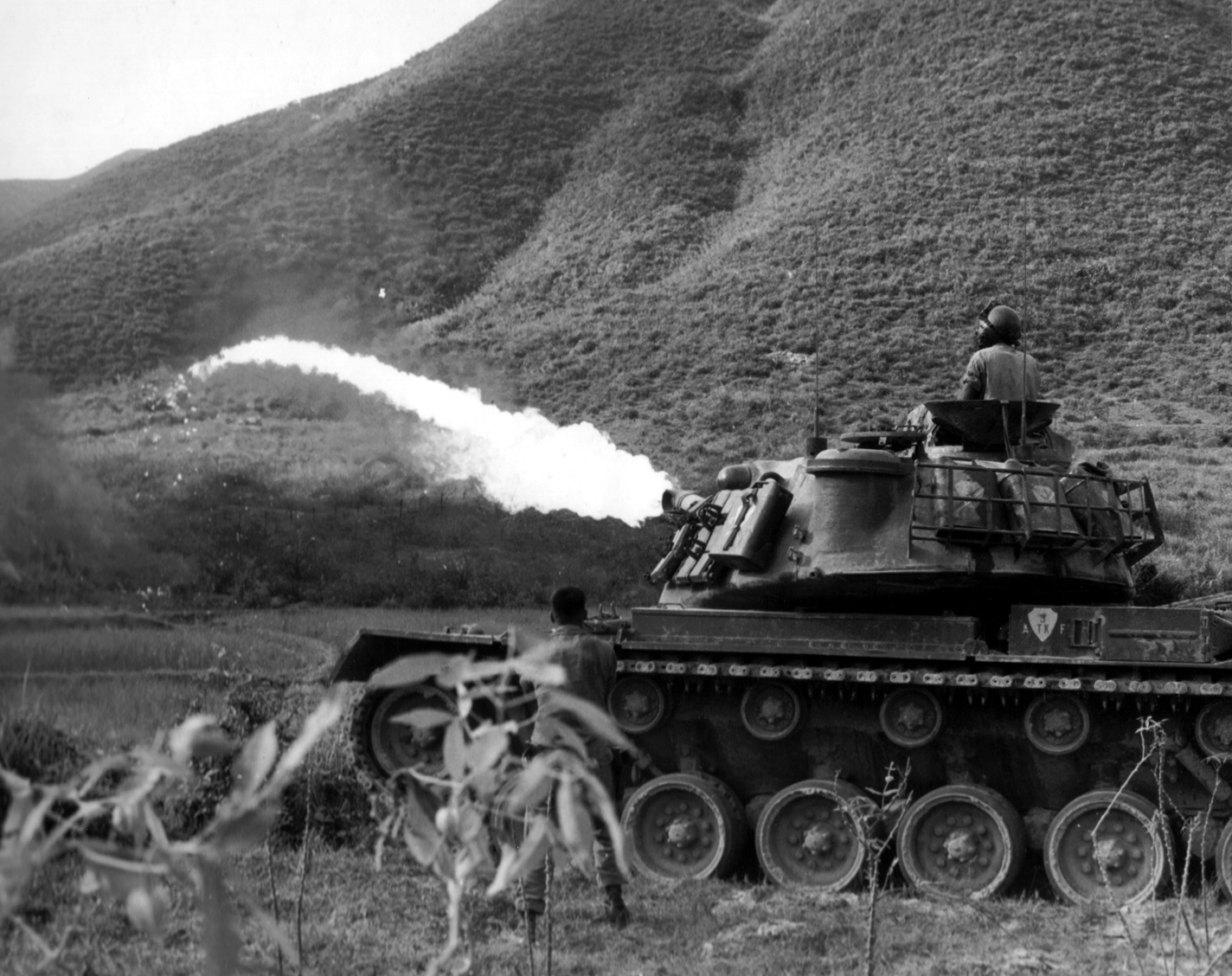
A USMC M67A2 "Zippo" in action near Da Nang, Vietnam.

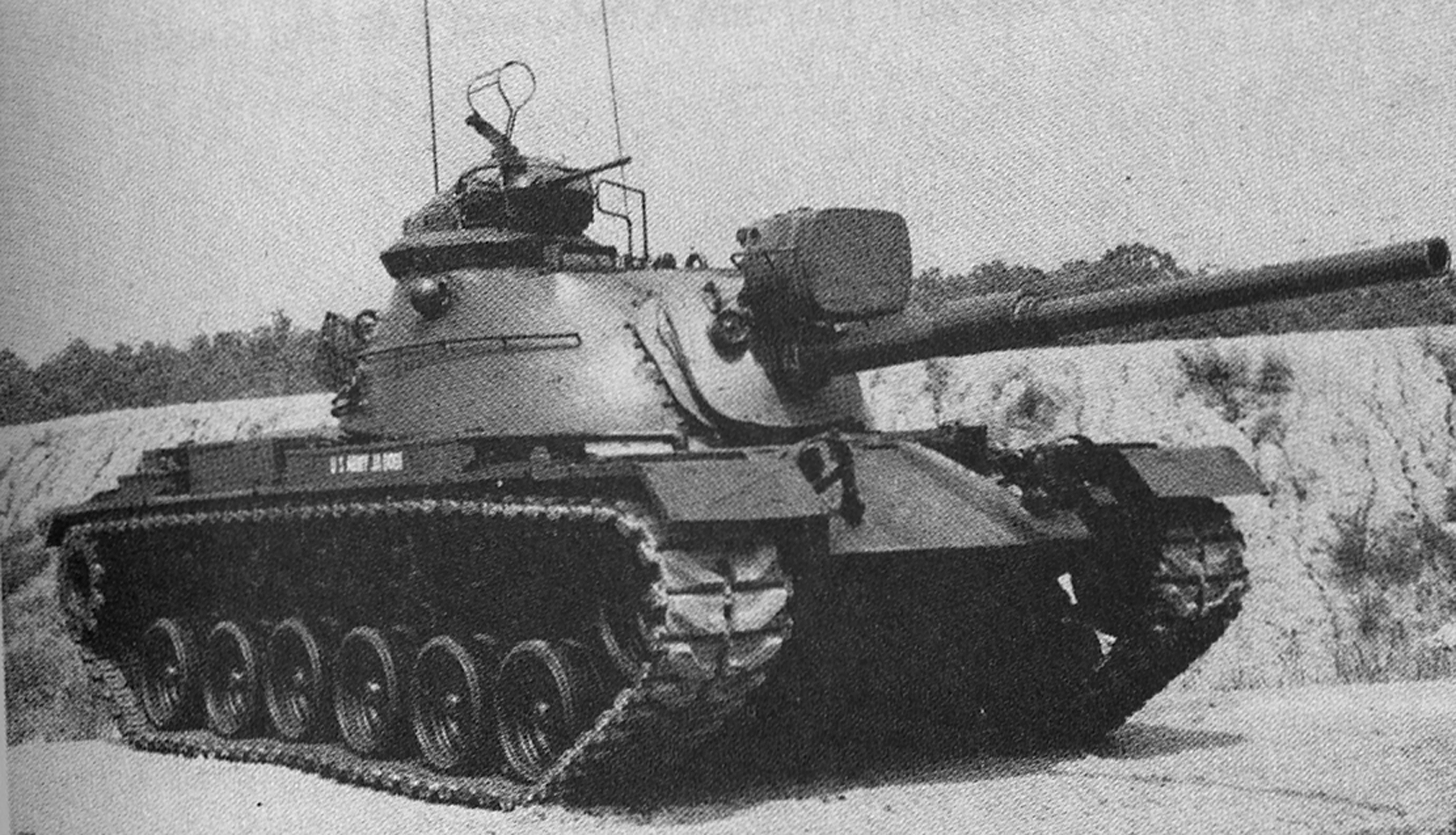
M48A5 Patton with an M48A3 commander's cupola.

The plans were laid in the US in the late fifties, for a tank with a 105 mm main gun and a redesigned hull offering better armor protection. The resulting M60 largely resembled the M48 it was based on, but has significant differences.

Initially, the M60 had essentially the same turret shape as the M48, but this was subsequently replaced with a distinctive "needlenose" design that minimized frontal cross-section to enemy fire. It was the last American tank to feature either the M60 machine gun or an escape hatch under the hull. The new vehicle was put into production in 1959, and entered service in 1960. Over 15,000 M60s (all variants) were constructed.

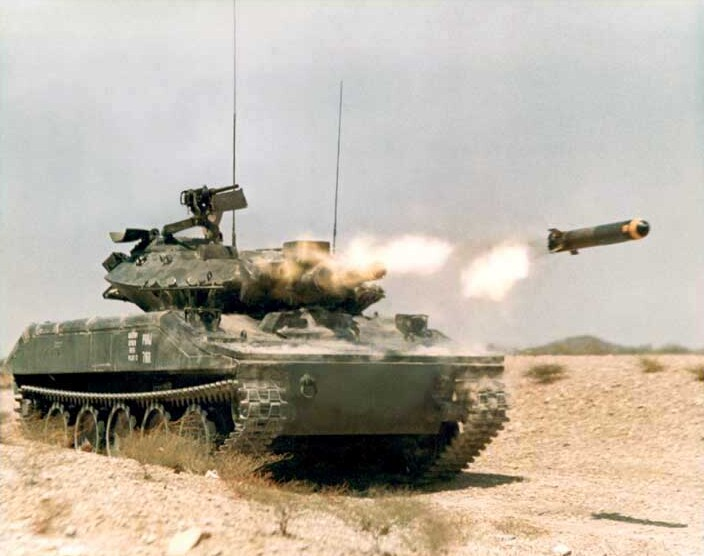
XM551 Sheridan

Development of the American M551 Sheridan light tank was initiated following the appearance of the Soviet amphibious PT-76 light tank.

The need for even lighter weight to make the tank transportable presented the design with a particularly difficult problem; guns capable of defeating modern tanks at reasonable ranges were so large that they demanded a large vehicle to carry them, so large that they couldn't be used as a "light" tank. The use of HEAT rounds instead of conventional penetrating ammunition could address this, but HEAT rounds work better at larger calibers. Gun weight is typically the product of caliber and muzzle velocity, so in the case of the XM551 they sacrificed the muzzle velocity, producing the low-velocity but relatively large-caliber 152 mm M81. HEAT rounds fired by the M81 could defeat any contemporary tank at shorter ranges, but its low velocity made it difficult to use at longer ranges, especially against moving targets. The large low-velocity gun was also ideal for infantry support, where higher performance anti-tank guns would often fire right through soft targets and their small-caliber guns left little room for explosive filler. The M551 Sheridan tank would thus be ideal for both direct fire support as well as short-distance anti-tank engagements.

The only niche where the M551 Sheridan was not ideal was the medium and long-range anti-tank engagement. The muzzle velocity was so low that a HEAT round fired at longer ranges would have to be "lofted", making aiming difficult, and the flight time would be so long that a moving target would be very difficult to hit. However, it appeared there was a solution to this problem by equipping the tank with gun-fired anti-tank missiles. For longer range engagements a missile would be fired instead of a HEAT round, and although its velocity would also be relatively slow, the guidance system would make a hit highly likely anyway. The M551 Sheridan appeared to offer the best of both worlds; for infantry support the large calibre gun allowed it to fire full-sized artillery rounds and canister shot, while also giving it reasonable short-range anti-tank performance from the same gun.

The M551 Sheridan had a steel turret and aluminum hull. The M551 had excellent mobility, able to run at speeds up to 45 miles per hour (72 km/h), which at that time was unheard of for a tracked vehicle. Swimming capability was provided by a flotation screen. The Sheridan entered service in June 1967 and was deployed to Vietnam in 1969. More than 1,600 M551s were built between 1966 and 1970.

The Sheridan was plagued by issues in service; mainly relating to the gun. Firing the gun would often adversely affect the delicate electronics, so the missile and guidance system was omitted from vehicles deployed to Vietnam. The gun had problems with cracks developing near the breech. The gun also was criticized for having too much recoil for the vehicle weight, the second and even third road wheels coming clear off the ground when the main gun fired. The aluminum hull was highly vulnerable to mines.

The Sheridan saw extensive action in the Vietnam War. A 1969 evaluation of the vehicles found the M551 was employed in reconnaissance, night patrol and road clearing, accumulating 39,455 road miles and 520 combat missions, with a ready rate of 81.3 percent. Despite vulnerability to rockets and mines, it was judged worth applying modifications and equip all cavalry squadrons with the Sheridan.

During the 1960s, the US and West Germany entered a joint project for a new tank common to both armies and intended to enter service in the 1970s. The MBT-70 project was technically advanced with sophisticated suspension, a low silhouette, spaced armor and advanced gun systems but suffered from excessive costs. Both partners mutually agreed to end the joint project in 1970.

The M60 tank was upgraded and designated the M60A2. It featured an entirely new low-profile turret with a commander's machine-gun cupola on top, featured a 152 mm gun, which fired conventional rounds as well as guided missiles. The M60A2 proved a disappointment, though technical advancements would pave the way for future tanks. The Shillelagh/M60A2 system was phased out from active units by 1981, and the turrets scrapped. Most of the M60A2 tanks were rebuilt as M60A3s with a 105mm gun.

=== Post-Vietnam ===
The US Army began to phase out the Sheridan in 1978, replacing these with the M3 Bradley cavalry fighting vehicle.

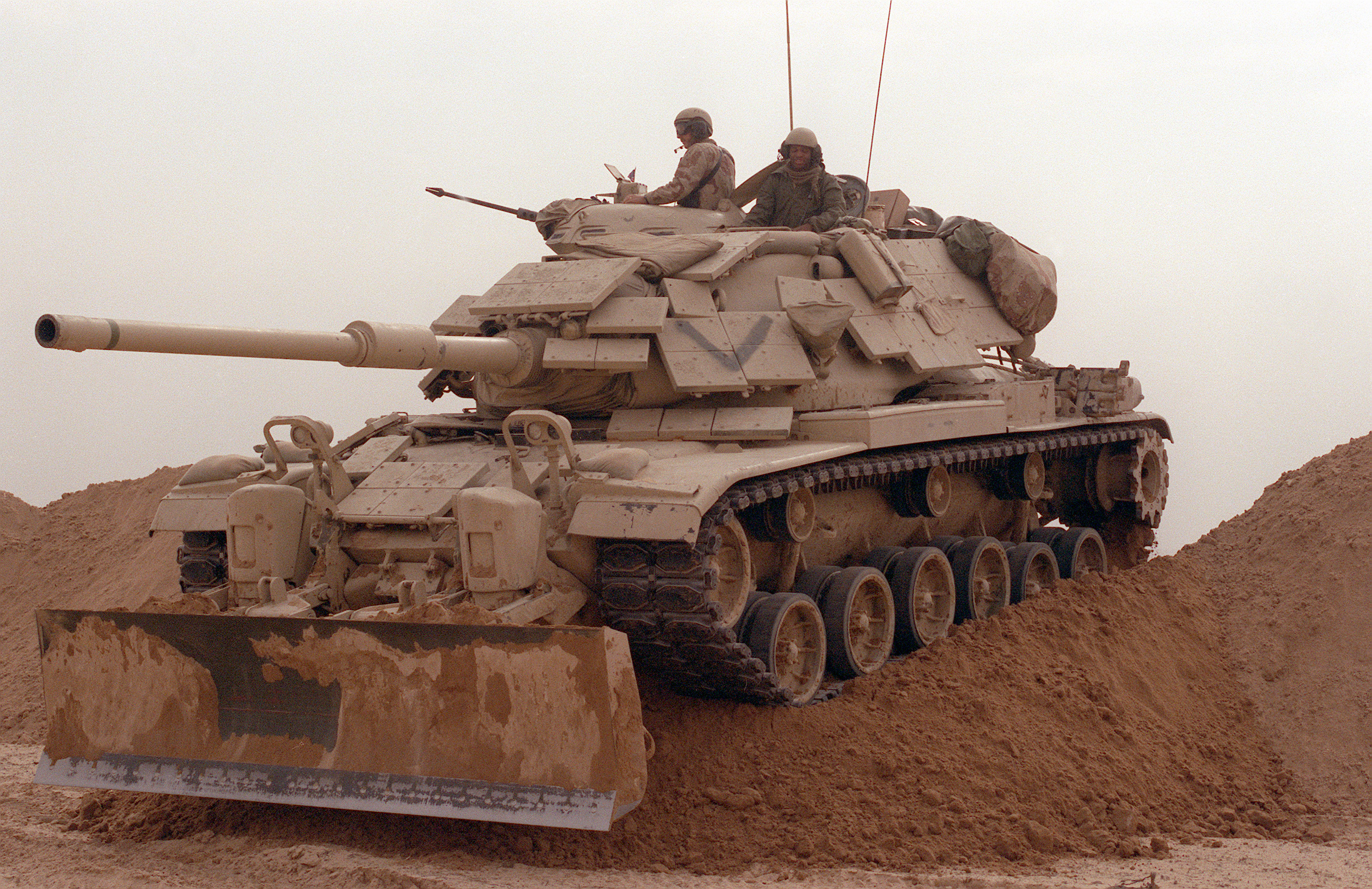
Marines from Company D, 2nd Tank Battalion, drive their M60A1 main battle tank during a breach exercise in Operation Desert Storm in 1991. The tank is fitted with reactive armor and an M-9 bulldozer kit.

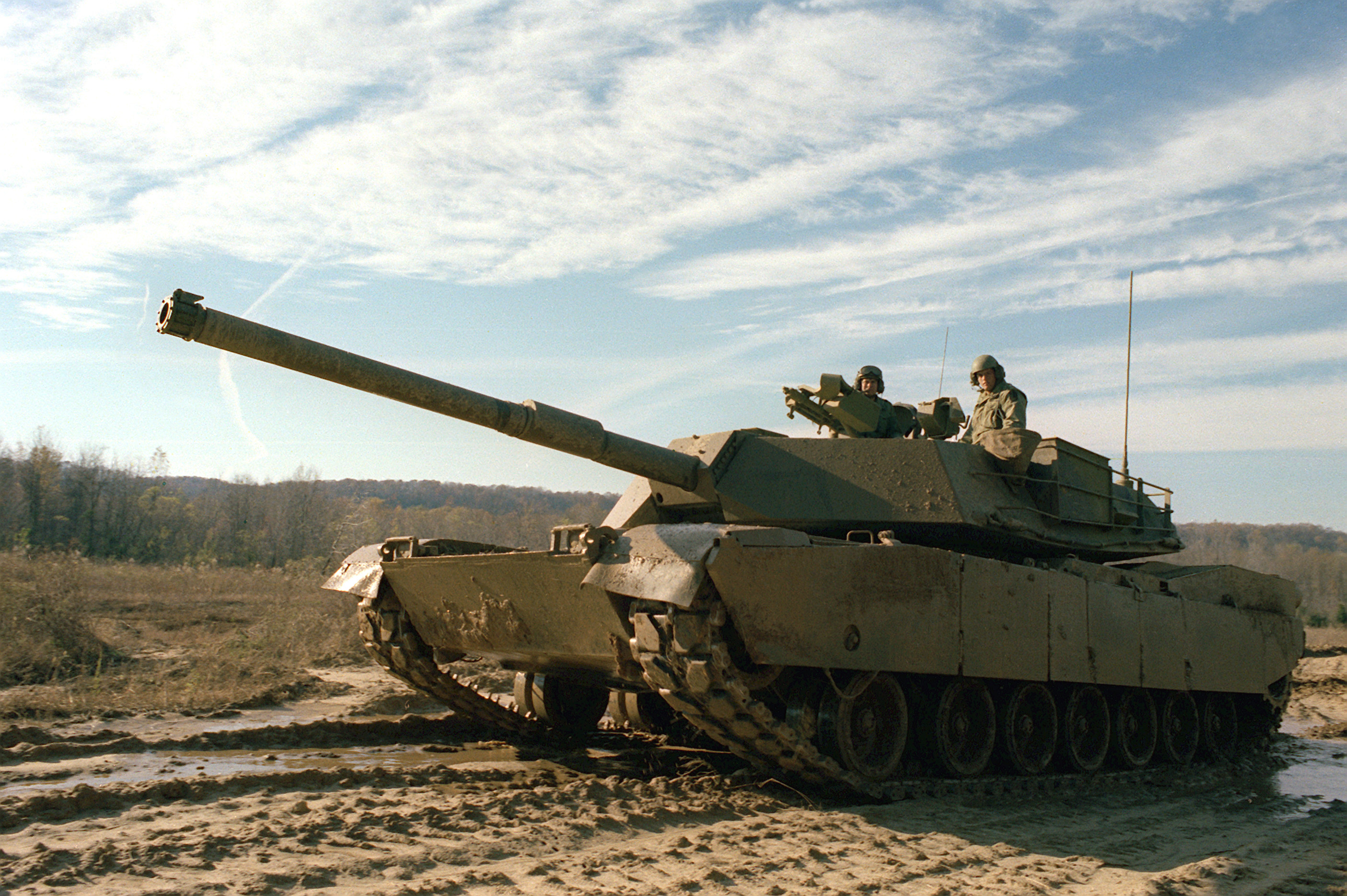
An XM1 Abrams, during a demonstration at Fort Knox, Kentucky in 1979.

The German Leopard tank, another 105mm armed tank, was introduced in 1965. It was sold widely to several nations in NATO as well as worldwide. It was followed in 1979 by the Leopard 2 with a 120mm smoothbore gun.

In 1976, prototypes of a new tank which became the M1 Abrams were delivered by Chrysler Defense and General Motors armed with a 105 mm rifled gun. The Chrysler Defense design was selected for development as the M1. In 1979, General Dynamics Land Systems Division purchased Chrysler Defense. The M1 Abrams came from the diverted funds from the over budget and impractical MBT-70 and XM815 projects.

The M1 was the first of its kind. It feature a low profile turret and for the first time ever on a tank, composite Chobham armor. Despite all these advances, the Abrams still retained the 4-man crew of the M60 tank as the autoloader was considered unproven and risky. It was armed with the same L7-derived 105mm gun as the M60. Over 3200 M1 Abrams were produced and first entered US Army service in 1980. About 6,000 upgraded M1A1 Abrams were produced and used the German 120 mm smoothbore gun, improved armor, and a CBRN protection system.

As the Abrams entered service in the 1980s, they would operate alongside M60A3 tanks. These exercises usually took place in Western Europe, especially West Germany, but also in some other countries like South Korea. During such training, Abrams crews honed their skills for use against the Soviet Union. However, by 1991 the USSR had collapsed and the Abrams would have its trial by fire in the Middle East.

The British FV4030/4 Challenger, continuing with a 120mm rifled gun and protected by Chobham armor entered service in 1983.

=== Gulf War/Iraq war ===
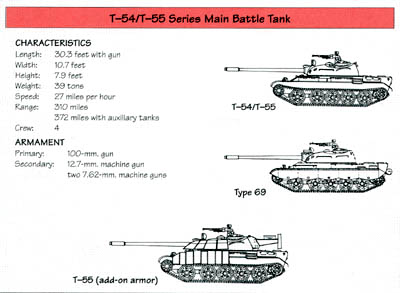
US Army recognition poster of T-54/55 series tanks

The Gulf War saw the US Marines still deploying obsolete M60 tanks while the rest of the tank forces had Abrams. The Iraqi forces were initially regular army units, equipped with tanks such as T-54/55 tanks and T-62s. The Coalition main battle tanks, such as the U.S. M1 Abrams, British Challenger 1, and Kuwaiti M-84AB were vastly superior to the Chinese Type 69 and domestically built T-72 tanks used by the Iraqis, with crews better trained and armoured doctrine better developed.

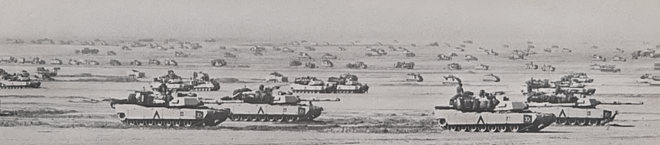
US M1 Abrams tanks from the 3rd Armored Division along the Line of Departure.

The majority of Iraqi armored forces still used old Chinese Type 59s and Type 69s, Soviet-made T-55s from the 1950s and 1960s, and some poor quality Asad Babil tanks (domestically assembled tank based on Polish T-72 hulls with other parts of mixed origin). These machines were not equipped with up-to-date equipment, such as thermal sights or laser rangefinders, and their effectiveness in modern combat was very limited.

The Iraqis failed to find an effective countermeasure to the thermal sights and sabot rounds used by Coalition armour. This equipment enabled them to engage and destroy Iraqi tanks from more than three times the range that Iraqi tanks could engage coalition tanks. Some Iraqi crews even fired training rounds at the U.S. and British tanks. These rounds (purchased in great number during the Iran–Iraq War due to their inexpensive cost) had soft steel penetrators and thus no hope of penetrating the advanced Chobham Armour of the Coalition tanks.

In the Iraqi war in 2003, an Iraqi division the 6th Armored Division of the Iraqi Army. which was equipped with T-55s and BMP-1s defending the control of key bridges over the Euphrates River and the Saddam Canal at Nasiriyah, were decimated by US Marines with M1 Abrams, and the division as a unit rendered incapable for combat during the Battle of Nasiriyah in March 2003, during the invasion.

In addition to the T-54/55 and T-62 tanks that Iraq had, the most feared to US armoured forces were the T-72 tanks in the Iraqi forces. Only Republican Guard divisions were equipped with Iraqi-modified T-72s. Many of the Iraqi T-72s were dug-in or hidden in groves, and then used to ambush the US or British tanks. In the war, the Iraqi T-72s were the preferred target for Apache helicopters and A-10s, in an attempt to diminish the combat power of Republican Guard divisions. The only chance for the Asad Babil T-72s against American tanks was to lure them to close range combat, or trying to ambush them from dug-in positions.

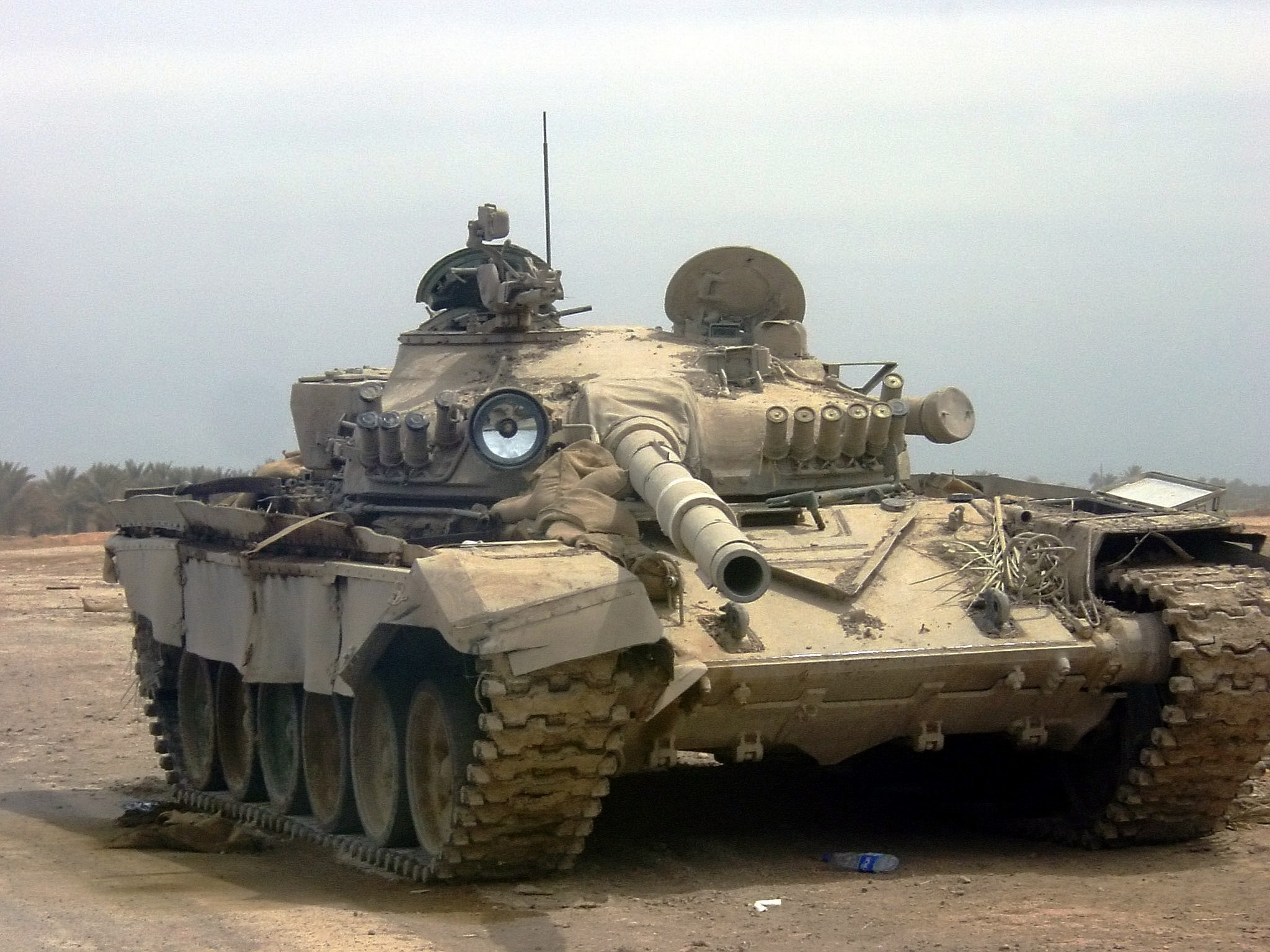
An Asad Babil abandoned after facing the final US thrust into Baghdad

But even in those conditions, the M1s usually prevailed, as proven in circumstances like the Battle of Baghdad, and the drive to the capital, where dozens of Iraqi MBTs were obliterated, or near Mahmoudiyah, south of Baghdad, April 3, 2003, (Iraqi Freedom) when US tanks engaged their counterparts from just 50 yards, shattering seven enemy T-72s without losses. The Lion of Babylon T-72 was utterly outclassed by the M1 Abrams, the Challenger and by any other contemporary Western main battle tank during the 2003 invasion of Iraq.

== See also ==
- History of the tank
- Tanks in World War I
- Comparison of World War I tanks
- Tanks of the interwar period
- Tanks in World War II
- Post-Cold War Tanks
