= The Speech =

The Speech may refer to:

- The Speech (Sharpley-Whiting book), 2009 book about Barack Obama
- The Speech (Sanders book), 2011 book by Bernie Sanders
- The Speech (film), 2020 Franco-Belgian comedy film
- "A Time for Choosing", 1964 speech by Ronald Reagan
- The Speech (The IT Crowd), a 2008 episode of the sitcom The IT Crowd
- Nutuk, a six-day speech by Mustafa Kemal Atatürk

== See also ==
- Speech (disambiguation)
- List of speeches
