= M46 Patton =

US Cold War medium tank

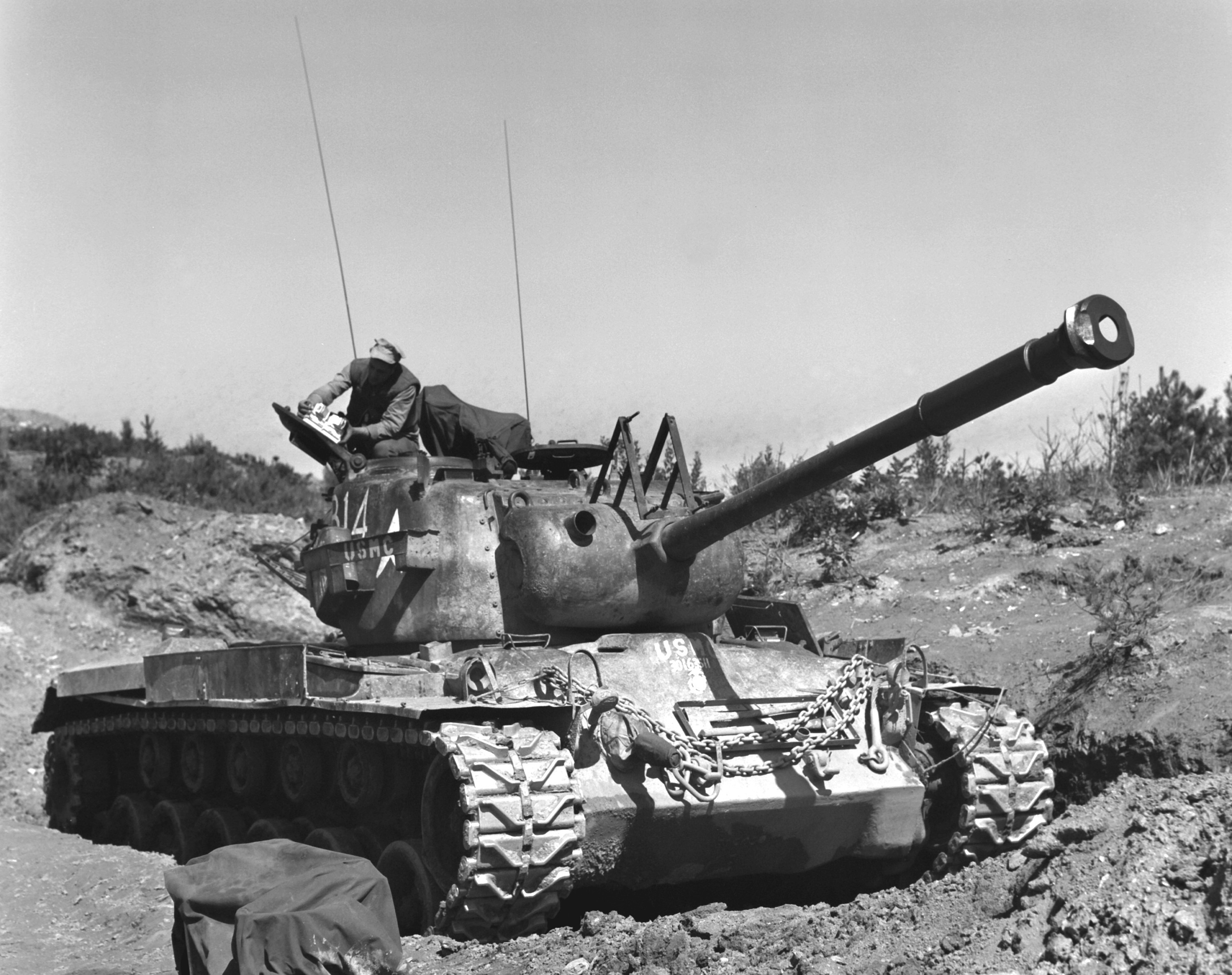
- An American M46 Patton tank of the United States Marine Corps, during the Korean War
- Type: Medium tank
- Place of origin: United States

Service history
- In service: 1949–1957
- Used by: See Operators below
- Wars: Korean War

Production history
- Designed: 1948–1949
- Manufacturer: Detroit Arsenal Tank Plant
- Developed into: M47 Patton
- No. built: 1,160 (all variants)
- Variants: M46A1; M46 (Dozer) – Fitted with M3 dozer conversion kit

Specifications
- Mass: 97,003 lb (48.502 short tons; 44.000 t)
- Length: 27.82 ft (8.48 m)
- Width: 11.48 ft (3.50 m)
- Height: 10.37 ft (3.16 m)
- Crew: Five; Commander; Gunner; Loader; Driver; Assistant Driver
- Armor: Up to 102 mm (4.0 in)
- Main armament: 90 mm gun M3A1; 70 rounds
- Secondary armament: Two .30 cal (7.62 mm) M1919A4 Browning machine gun; .50 cal (12.7 mm) M2 machine gun
- Engine: Continental AV-1790-5A V12, air-cooled Twin-turbo gasoline engine 810 hp (600 kW)
- Power/weight: 18.4 hp (13.7 kW) / tonne
- Transmission: General Motors CD-850-3 or CD-850-4; 2 ranges forward; 1 reverse
- Suspension: Torsion bar suspension
- Ground clearance: 18.82 in (478 mm)
- Fuel capacity: 232 U.S. gal (880 L)
- Operational range: 81 mi (130 km)
- Maximum speed: 30 mph (48 km/h)

The M46 Patton was an American medium tank designed to replace the M26 Pershing and M4 Sherman. It was one of the U.S. Army's principal medium tanks of the early Cold War, with models in service from 1949 until the mid-1950s. It was not widely used by U.S. Cold War allies, being exported only to Belgium, and only in small numbers to train crews on the upcoming M47 Patton.

The M46 was the first tank to be named after General George S. Patton Jr., commander of the U.S. Third Army during World War II and one of the earliest American advocates for the use of tanks in battle. (Note: although the Ordnance Committee Minutes/OCM #33476 ceased utilizing the heavy, medium, and light tank designations on 7 November 1950; going to the "...Gun Tank designation"))

== History ==
After World War II, most U.S. Army armored units were equipped with a mix of M4 Sherman and M26 Pershing tanks. Designed initially as a heavy tank, the M26 Pershing tank was reclassified as a medium tank after the war. The M26 was a significant improvement over the M4 Sherman in firepower and protection. Its mobility, however, was deemed unsatisfactory for a medium tank, as it used the same engine as the much lighter M4A3 and was plagued with an unreliable transmission.

Work began in January 1948 on replacing the original power plant with the Continental AV1790-3 engine and Allison CD-850-1 cross-drive transmission. This design was initially called the M26E2, but modifications continued to accumulate; eventually, the Bureau of Ordnance decided that the tank needed its own unique designation, the M46. The upgraded M26 received a new power plant and a main gun with a bore evacuator.

Upon completion of the first model of the Detroit Tank Arsenal production line in November 1948, the M46 was christened after the late General George S. Patton Jr. By December the Army had ordered several hundred. In July 1950 Detroit Arsenal was producing Pershings and M46s at a rate of over a dozen a day. In August 1950 President Harry S. Truman authorized funding for increased M46 production as part of an expansion of the heavy tank development program.

A total of 1,160 M46s of all variants were built.

== Combat service ==
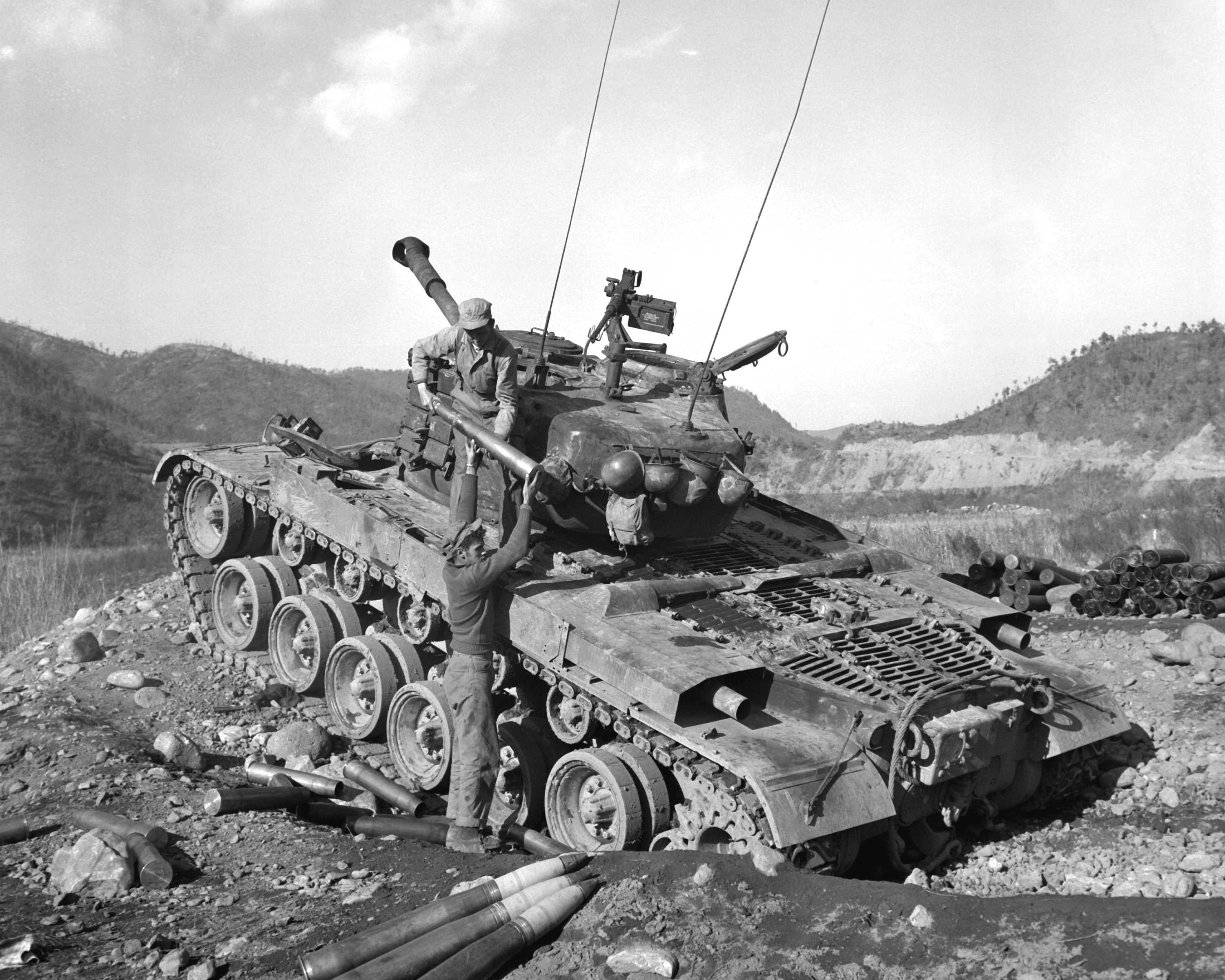
M46 tank providing indirect fire support in Korea

The only American combat use of the M46 Patton was during the Korean War. On 8 August 1950, the first M46 Patton tanks, belonging to the 6th Tank Battalion, landed in South Korea. The M46 proved to be capable against North Korean T-34 medium tanks. By the end of 1950, 200 M46 Pattons had been fielded, forming about 15% of US tank strength in Korea; the balance of 1,326 tanks shipped to Korea during 1950 were 679 M4A3 Shermans (including the M4A3E8 variant), 309 M26 Pershings, and 138 M24 Chaffee light tanks. Subsequent shipments of M46 and M46A1 Pattons allowed all remaining M26 Pershings to be withdrawn during 1951, and most Sherman equipped units were also reequipped.

M46 series operators include: 1st Tank Battalion and regimental Antitank Platoons of the 1st Marine Division by 1952, 72nd Armor Regiment of the 2nd Infantry Division by January 1952, 64th Tank Battalion of the 3rd Infantry Division, 73rd Tank Battalion of the 7th Infantry Division by January 1951, 6th Tank Battalion of the 24th Infantry Division, 140th Tank Battalion (took over the tanks of the 6th Tank Battalion) and regimental tank companies of the 40th Infantry Division by October 1951, and the 245th Tank Battalion of the 45th Infantry Division by 1952. Several other regimental tank companies gained M46/M46A1s by the end of the war, including the 7th and 65th Infantry Regiments of the 3rd Infantry Division.

A surviving example of the M46 Patton tank can be seen on display at the War Memorial of Korea in Seoul.

In the 1950s, small numbers of M46s were leased for training purposes at no cost to some European countries, including Belgium, France and Italy, in preparation for the introduction of the M47. American instruction teams used the vehicles to train European tank crews and maintenance personnel.

== Variants ==
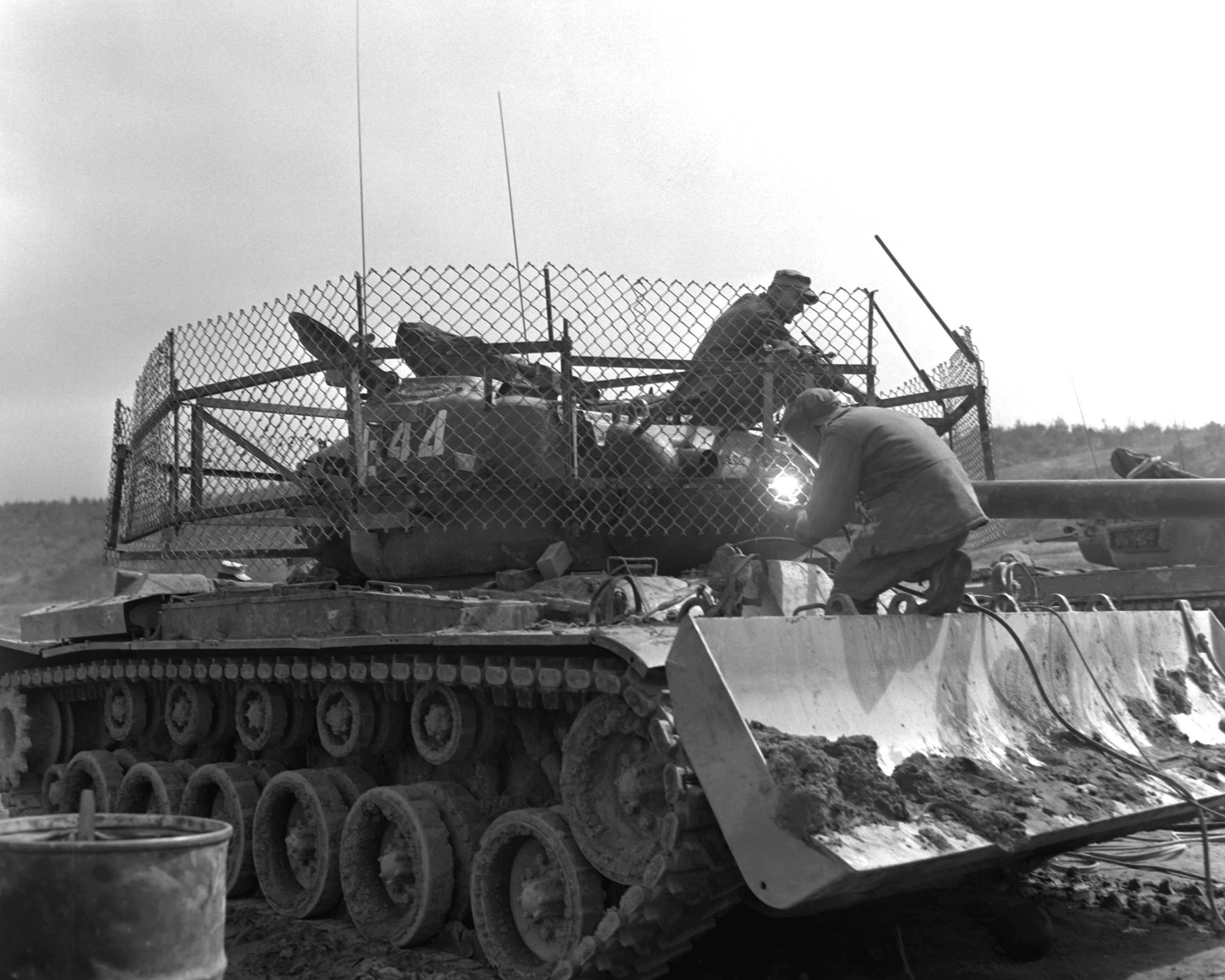
M46 Dozer with M3 dozer conversion kit.

- M46 (Dozer) – Variant equipped with M3 dozer conversion kit.
- M46A1 – Product improved variant with improved braking, cooling and fire suppression systems, as well as improved electrical equipment, AV-1790-5B engine and CD-850-4 transmission.
- M46E1 – Pilot model, M46 hull with T42 turret, fitted with the M36 90 mm Gun, and was longer to incorporate a radio, ventilator, and featured a stereoscopic rangefinder; only one built. Prototype of the M47 Patton.

	M46 and M46A1
Length (gun forward)	333.6 in (8.5 m)
Width	138.3 in (3.5 m)
Height (over MG)	125.1 in (3.2 m)
Ground clearance	18.8 in (47.8 cm)
Top speed	30 mph (48 km/h)
Fording	48 in (1.2 m)
Max. grade	60%
Max. trench	8.5 ft (2.6 m)
Max. wall	36 in (0.9 m)
Range	80 mi (130 km)
Power	810 hp (600 kW) at 2800 rpm
Power-to-weight ratio	16.7 hp/ST (13.7 kW/t)
Torque	1,610 lb⋅ft (2,180 N⋅m) at 2200 rpm
Weight, combat loaded	97,000 lb (44,000 kg)
Ground pressure	14.0 psi (97 kPa)
Main armament	90 mm M3A1
Elevation, main gun	+20° −10°
Traverse rate	15 seconds/360°
Main gun ammo	70 rounds
Firing rate	8 rounds/minute

== Operators ==
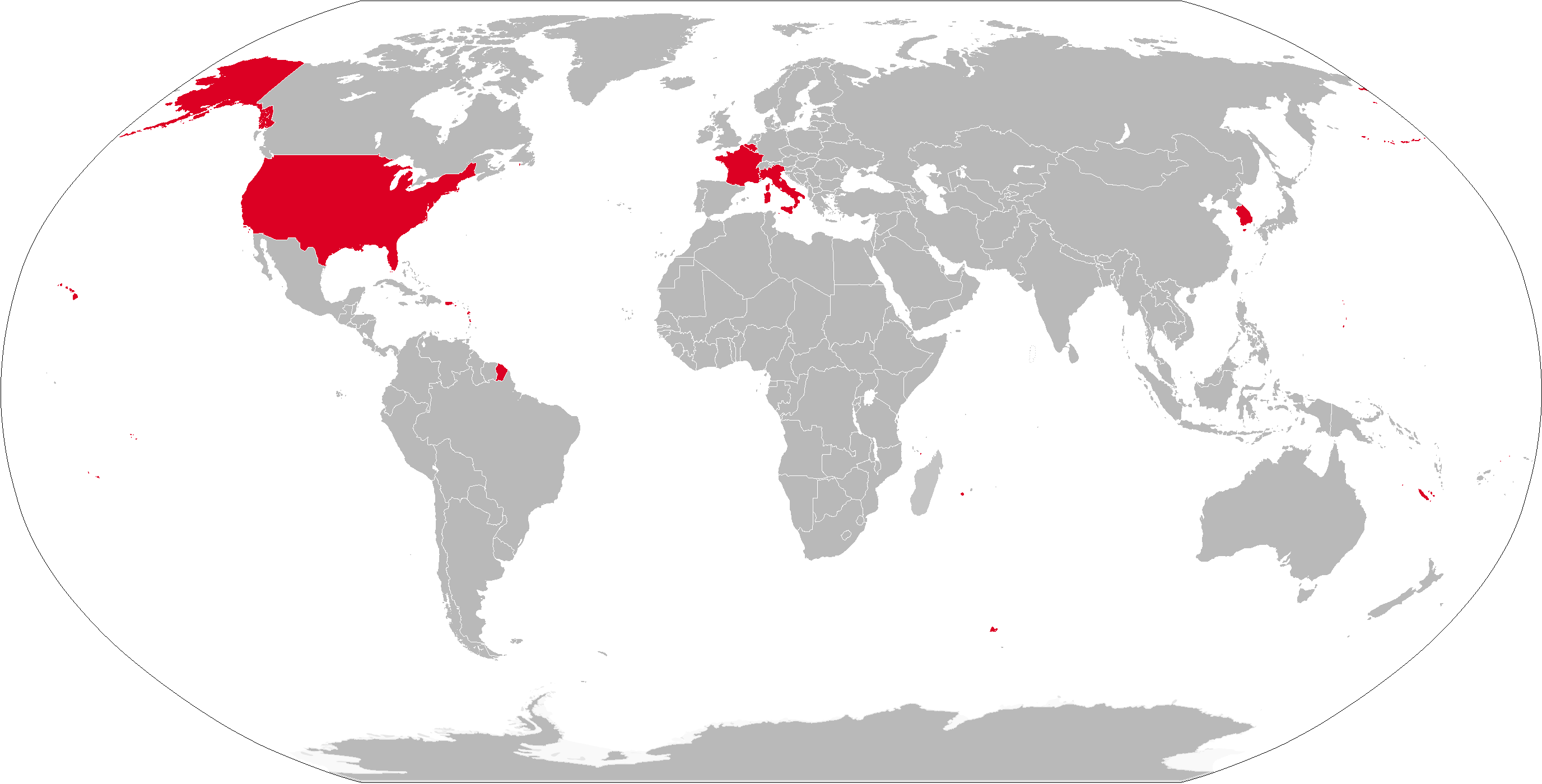
Map of M46 operators with former operators in red

=== Former operators ===
- Belgium
- France
- Italy
- Republic of Korea: A number of M46s were transferred from withdrawing U.S. troops after the Korean War.
- United States

== Gallery ==
M46 Patton and variants
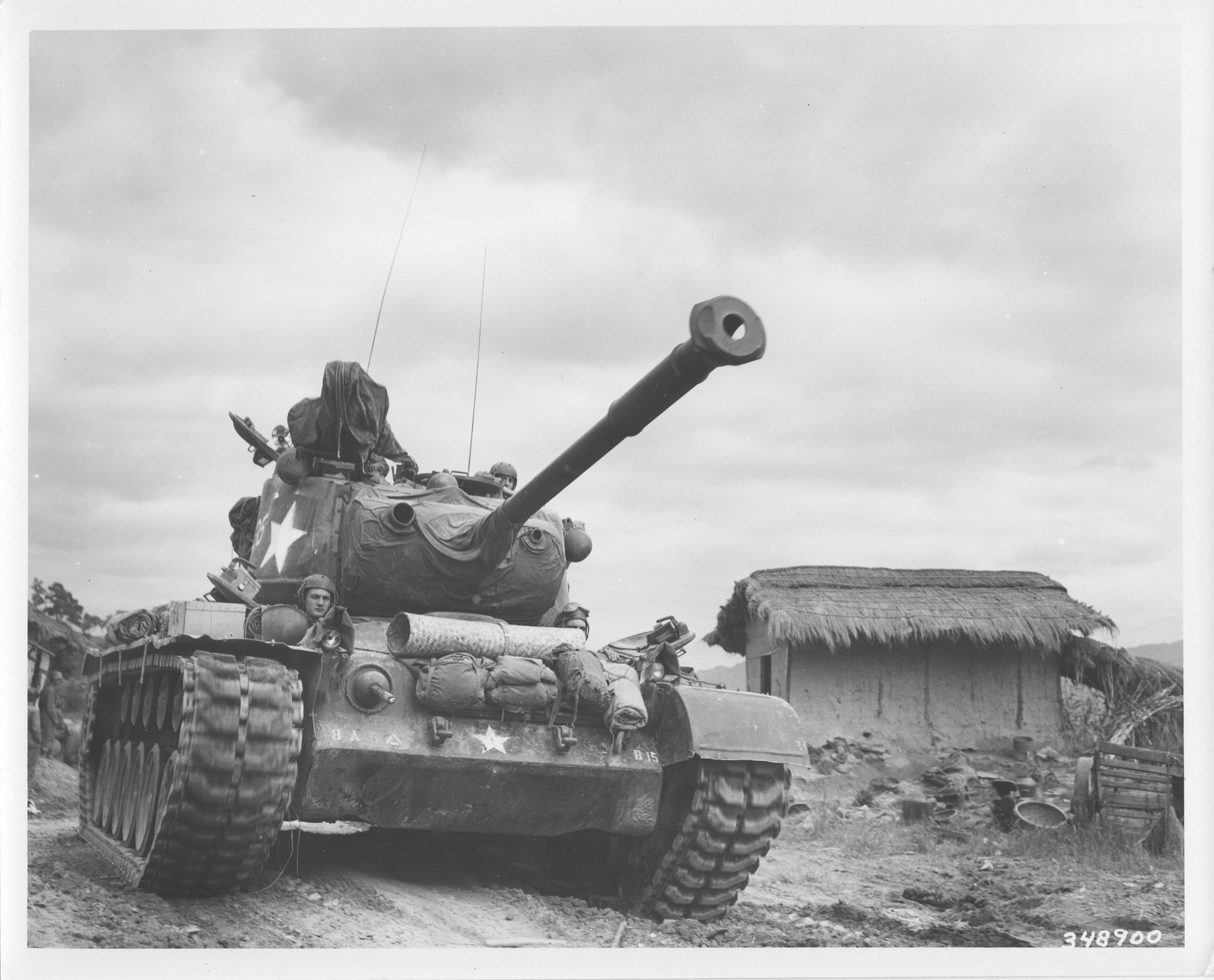
M46 Patton tank and crew passing through the village of Kumko, Korea, in September 1950.

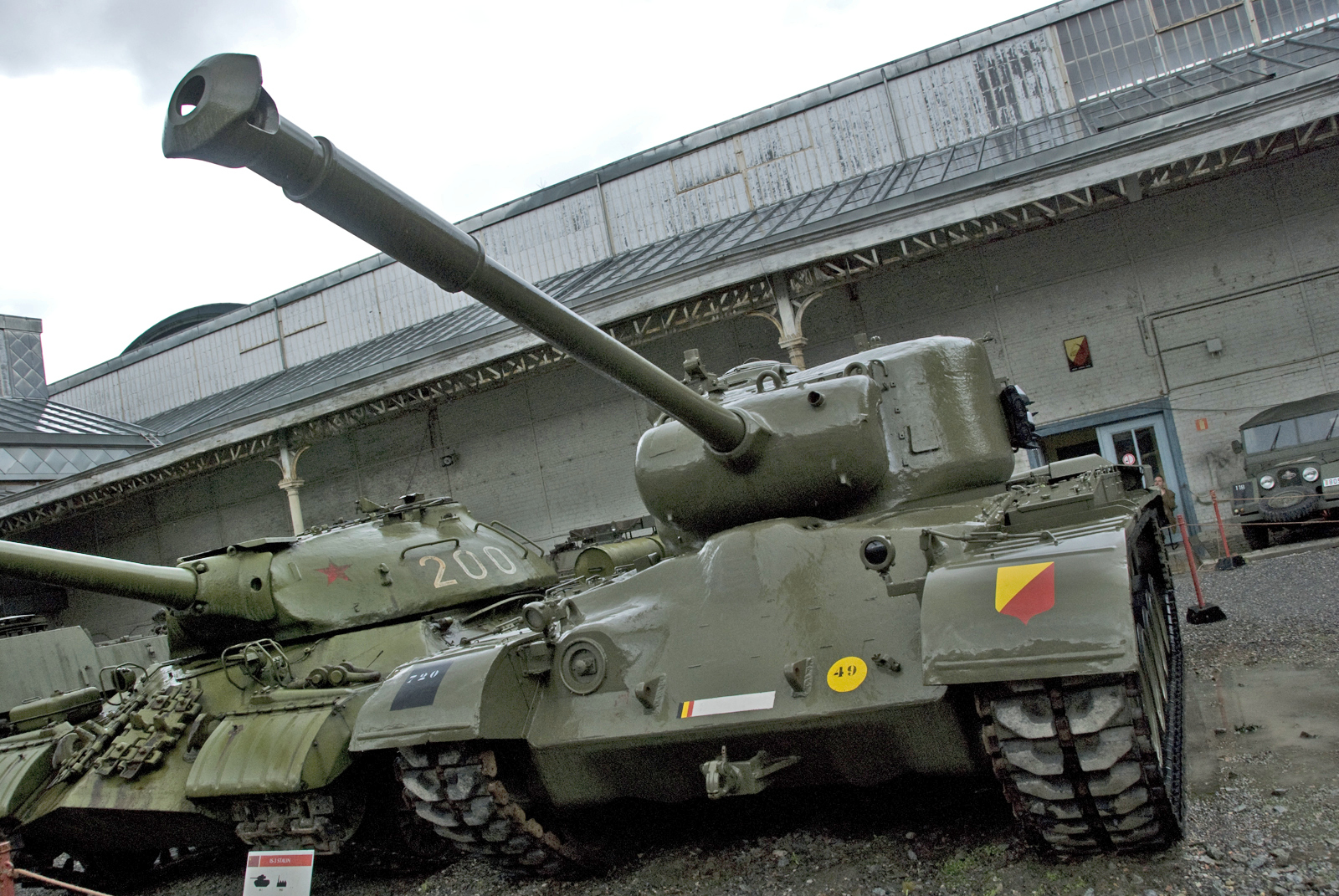
Belgian M46A1 Patton tank. One of eight vehicles leased to Belgium in 1952, this particular tank was donated by the United States to the Royal Army Museum of Brussels in 1984.

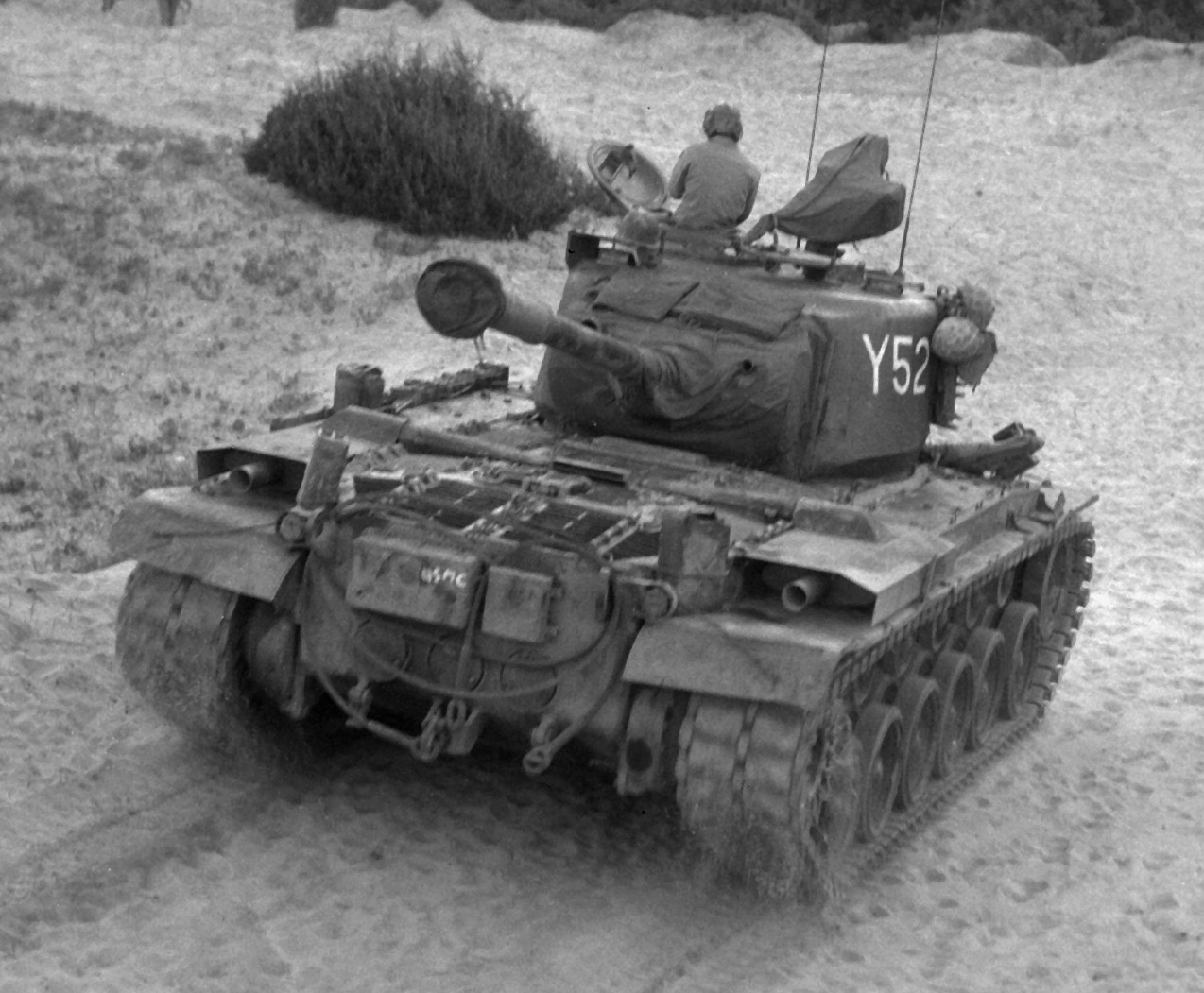
An M46 Patton tank of the United States Marine Corps, in July 1952, during the Korean War. Note the different rear plate and twin fender-mounted exhausts.

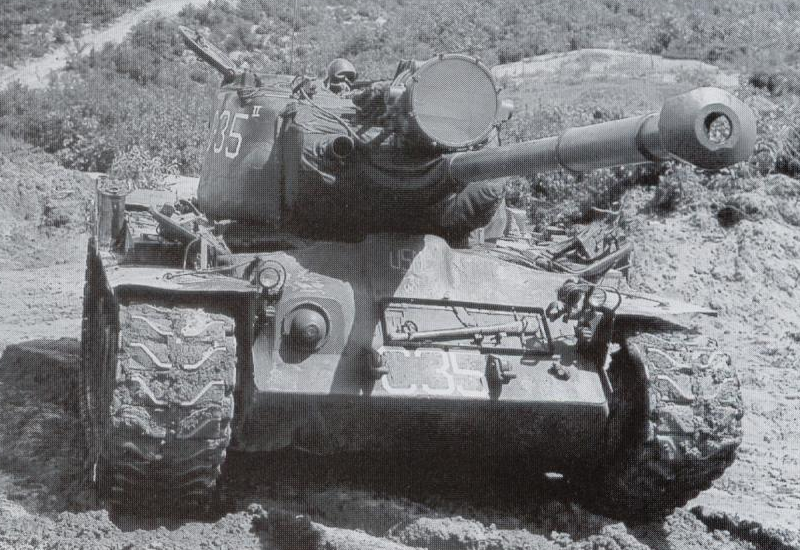
M46 Patton with a searchlight

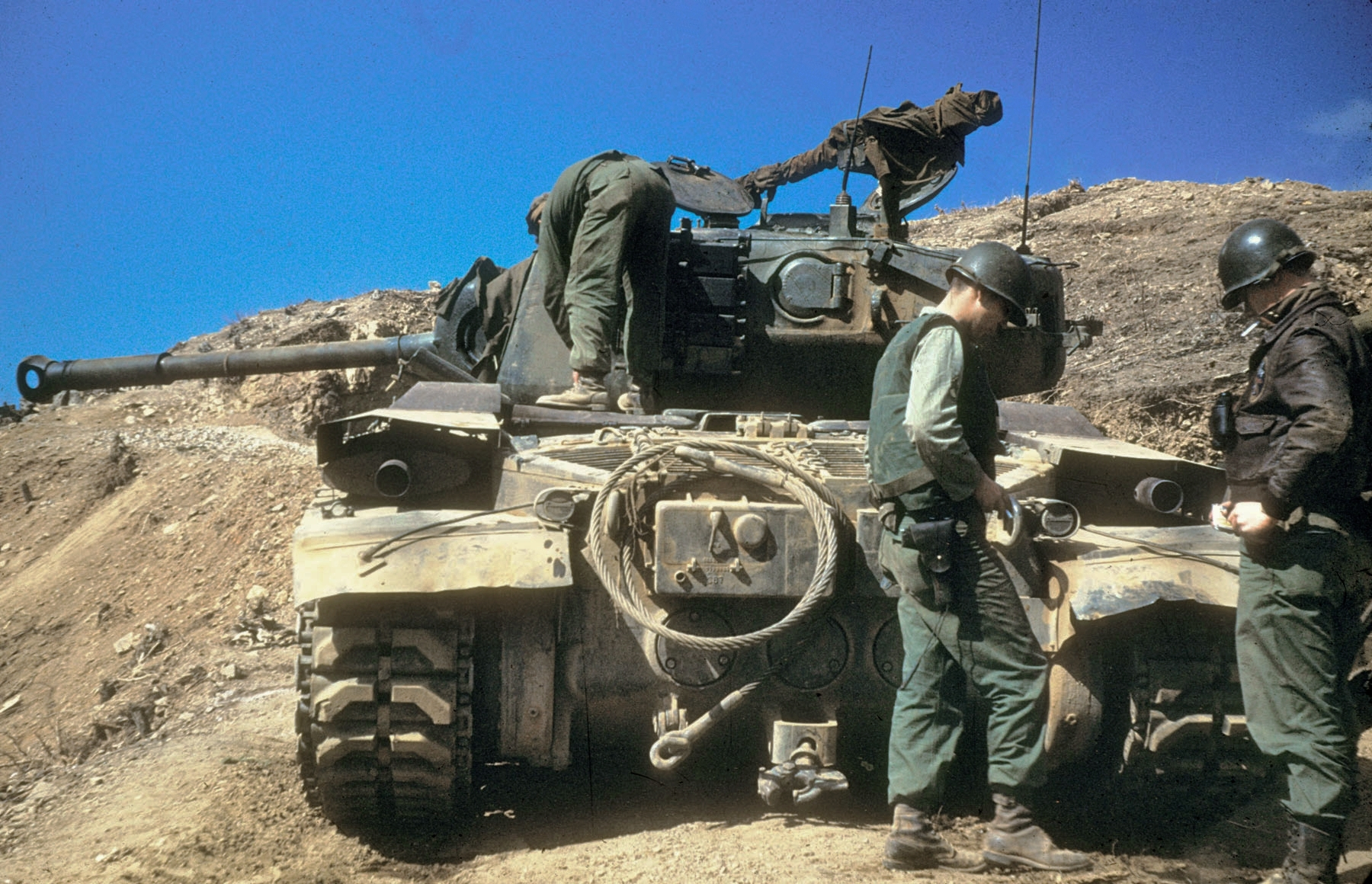
USAF forward air controller with US Army M46 tank during Korean War (1950–1953)

== See also ==
- List of armored fighting vehicles

=== Tanks of comparable role, performance and era ===
- Centurion Mk. 1 British main battle tank
- T-54 Soviet main battle tank
