= George Speak =

English footballer (1890 – 1953)

Personal information
- Full name: George Speak
- Date of birth: 7 November 1890
- Place of birth: Blackburn, England
- Date of death: 10 March 1953 (aged 62)
- Height: 5 ft 10 in (1.78 m)
- Position: Full-back

Senior career*
Years	Team	Apps	(Gls)
1908–1909	Clitheroe Central		
1909–1910	Darwen		
1910–1911	West Bromwich Albion	0	(0)
1911–1913	Grimsby Town	4	(0)
1913–1914	Gainsborough Trinity		
1914–1919	West Ham United	13	(0)
1919–1923	Preston North End	65	(0)
1923–1925	Leeds United	28	(0)
- * Club domestic league appearances and goals

George Speak (7 November 1890 – 10 March 1953) was an English professional footballer who played as a full-back.
