= Speak (Hungarian rapper) =

- Also known as: Tom Deak
- Born: Tamás Deák; 31 May 1976 (age 50); Budapest, Hungary
- Origin: Hungary
- Genres: Hip hop, political hip hop
- Occupations: Rapper, actor
- Years active: 2000s – present

Tamás Deák (born 31 May 1976), better known by his stage name Speak, is a rap artist, model and actor based in Hungary. The music video for his 2003 anti-war song, "Stop the War", became popularized through video sharing websites and was satirized by the US comedy TV show Saturday Night Live. Speak lives in London, England.

== "Stop the War" ==
Speak is known primarily for his 2003 rap single "Stop the War". A video for this single appeared on YouTube, and featured other musicians.

The song and music video were parodied on Saturday Night Live in a sketch starring Beck Bennett titled "World Peace Rap", broadcast 7 May 2017.

== Collaborations ==
On 20 June 2012, Speak announced on his website that he would be supporting Australian rap duet Hilltop Hoods and DJ Debris on their upcoming UK tour.
