= Land cruiser =

Land cruiser or landcruiser may refer to:

- Studebaker Land Cruiser
- Toyota Land Cruiser, a series of off-road vehicles by Toyota
  - Toyota Land Cruiser Prado, or Toyota Prado, the smaller model of Toyota's Land Cruiser range
- Landship, a.k.a. land cruiser, land ironclad
  - an armoured combat vehicle, a tank
  - A literal translation of the German Landkreuzer, which referred to superheavy tank designs
    - the Landkreuzer P. 1000 Ratte
    - the Landkreuzer P. 1500 Monster
  - Land Ship, a nickname for British heavy tanks of World War I
- In Harry Turtledove's Worldwar series, a landcruiser is an army tank.

== See also ==
- Land ironclad
- Lunar Cruiser
