= Landkreuzer =

Landkreuzer is the German word for landship and refers to a pair of unbuilt German vehicle designs from World War II:

- Landkreuzer P. 1000 Ratte, a proposed giant tank armed with naval guns
- Landkreuzer P. 1500 Monster, a proposal to turn the Schwerer Gustav into a self-propelled gun
