= Tank classification =

Categorizing tanks by weight or role

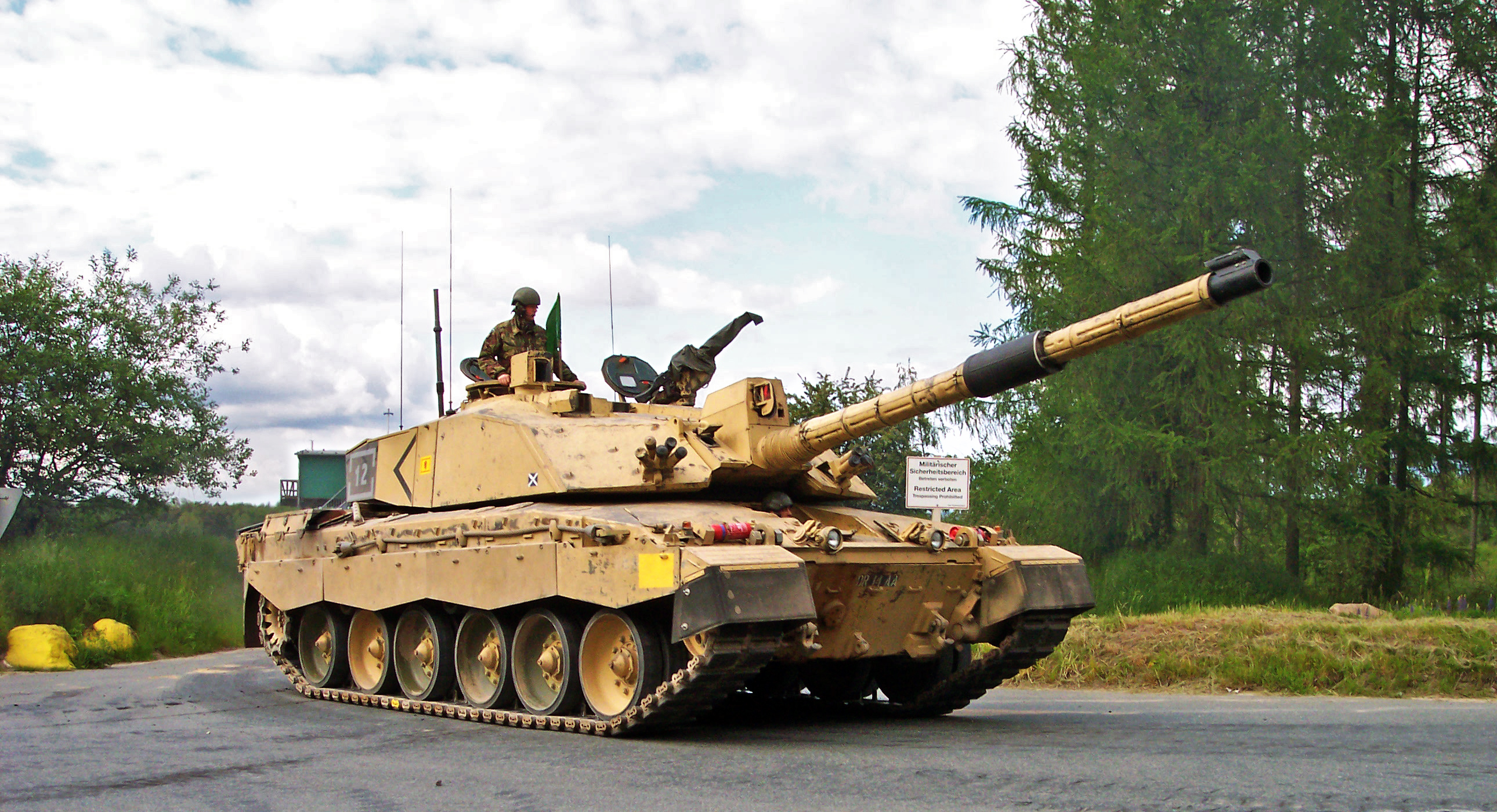
The Challenger 2 is a main battle tank.

Tank classification is a taxonomy of identifying either the intended role or weight class of tanks. The classification by role was used primarily during the developmental stage of the national armoured forces, and referred to the doctrinal and force structure utility of the tanks based on design emphasis. The weight classification is used in the same way truck classification is used, and is intended to accommodate logistic requirements of the tanks.

Many classification systems have been used over a hundred years of tank history. An early division in the definition of roles was between infantry tanks intended to focus on supporting infantry in the assault, and cruiser tanks intended for classic cavalry missions of exploitation, screening and reconnaissance. As World War II progressed, the separation of "infantry" and "cruiser" roles generally disappeared and the "universal tank" started to take over.

Classification has always been determined by the prevailing theories of armoured warfare, which have been altered in turn by rapid advances in technology. Not one classification system works across all periods or all nations; in particular, weight-based classification was inconsistent between countries and eras.

With the worldwide adoption of the modern main battle tank designs, which favour a modular universal design, these sorts of classifications are mostly eliminated from modern terminology. All main battle tanks are typically armed with weapons with similar characteristics but some may be armoured more than others. These are complemented with light tanks, typically in the role of (armed) reconnaissance.

== Development of tank classification schemes ==
Development of a tank classification system started in World War I, when tanks were separated into light tanks and tankettes, medium tanks, and heavy tanks, based on size and weight. Heavy tanks were required to be large to cross trenches, and consequently weighed a lot. Medium tanks were smaller and had help to cross trenches so weighed less. Light tanks were much smaller and lightweight, allowing transport on lorries (trucks).

These tanks started to be used in different roles based on armour and mobility. Light tanks could provide mobile machine gun support for infantry, medium tanks could be used to react and exploit situational advantages, heavy tanks could be used for the main advance.

As tank doctrine developed, the role of tanks started to be defined. Initially based on naval ideas, in late 1916 Captain Giffard Le Quesne Martel (later Major General Sir) proposed a tank army formed of Destroyer tanks, Battle tanks (of Heavy, Medium and Light types), Torpedo tanks (utilising large trench mortars), Engineer tanks, Supply tanks and Ambulance tanks

During the inter-war years, British tank doctrine evolved through experimental trials and the works of J.F.C. Fuller, P.C.S. Hobart and B.H. Liddell-Hart. By 1936, these settled on the roles of light tanks for reconnaissance, infantry tanks to support an advance, and cruiser tanks in the cavalry role, using mobility to exploit situational advantages. The works were further explored by Heinz Guderian in the development of German tank doctrine and Blitzkrieg for the opening stages of World War II.

Other nations continued to use the light, medium and heavy designations. US and Soviet forces also incorporated the tank destroyer concept, allowing their light, medium, and heavy tanks to prioritise works with the infantry. Soviet and US forces added the concept of the flame tank, armed with a flamethrower.

During the course of the war, German forces added command tanks, specialised to the task of co-ordinating tank formations. This idea caught on with other nations. Development of British doctrine added howitzer-armed close support tanks, similar to the older torpedo tank role. These soon became critical to launching smoke, and post-war smoke dischargers became common on tanks. Both command and close support tanks were typically based on the type of tank they were supporting, so may not be considered a completely separate classification.

With the fall of France, the need for infantry tanks to advance with troops started to be replaced with a need for Assault tanks, a new class with heavier frontal armour to take on battlefield defences. Infantry tanks proved capable in this new role however, and the designation was rarely applied outside of experimental production. The term saw limited use with both British and US forces in joint development. Hobart would later return to Martel's idea of Engineer tanks in the 1944 run-up to D-Day with Hobarts Funnies, and specialised tanks became a core component of the modern battlefield.

Towards the end of the war, increases in tank engine power started to create the possibility of multi-role vehicles. British light tanks had largely been replaced with armoured cars and carriers, and engineers proposed a new Universal tank coupling Cruiser tank mobility with Infantry tank armour. The concept became redundant when Cruiser tank armour increased anyway, rendering the infantry tank obsolete.

Post-war the light, medium, and heavy designations remained prevalent until the multi-role concept evolved into the main battle tank, rendering the earlier medium and heavy designations obsolete. Heavy tanks were largely withdrawn from service as medium multi-role vehicles offered similar capability with less of the weight-based constraints. Light tanks remained in use for flexibility, such as with air-portable use.

== Size classifications ==
Tanks are often referred to by weight-based classifications such as 'light', 'medium' or 'heavy', and by extension the role that this size of tank was suitable for. There were many names given to different tank types, and similar names did not assure similar design goals. Some light tanks were relatively slow, and some were fast. Some heavy tanks had large-calibre, low-velocity, anti-infantry bunker-busters, and some had high-velocity anti-tank guns. Furthermore, expected weights for a given tank type vary over time; a medium tank of 1939 could weigh less than a light tank of 1945.

While originally based on weight, the light, medium, and heavy classifications expanded based on tactical use. They now have other meanings than just weight, including relation to gun size, the amount of armour, and, most importantly, tactical role. Post-war in 1948 France, Canada, and the United States agreed to classify tanks as light gun, medium gun, or heavy gun.

After World War II, less expensive armoured cars and more specialised tracked vehicles gradually took over the roles of light tanks.

Heavy tanks were shown to be incapable of keeping up with mobile warfare, but advances in engine, weapon, and armour technology allowed medium tanks to acquire the best characteristics of heavy tanks, allowing them to fulfil multiple roles on the battlefield. The ultimate in mobility, firepower, and protection were rolled into the main battle tank (MBT). In 1957, the Fourth Tripartite Armour Conference recommended to replace medium and heavy tanks with a single class – Main Battle Tanks.

=== World War I ===
In World War I, the first tank, the 28-long-ton (28 t; 31-short-ton) British Mark I, was designed for supporting infantry by crossing trenches and attacking machine-gun posts. This became known as a heavy tank alongside other, lighter, types.

A lighter British tank introduced into service in 1918, at 14 long tons (14.2 t; 15.7 short tons) and armed with machine guns only was given the designation "Tank, Medium Mark A" and known as the "Whippet".

The two-man 7-tonne (7-long-ton; 8-short-ton) French Renault FT was known as a light tank.

Super-heavy breakthrough tanks such as the Char 2C (69 t or 68 long tons or 76 short tons) or the K-Wagen (120 t or 118 long tons or 132 short tons) were nearly completed before the war ended. In comparison, the current British MBT, the Challenger 2, weighs some 62.5–75 t (62–74 long tons; 69–83 short tons).

=== Interbellum ===
British tank designs in the immediate post-World War I era were developments along the same design as the Mark A and were named as Mediums being around 18 long tons (18 t; 20 short tons). The first tank to enter service that broke with the design was known as the "Vickers Light Tank" (it weighed about 12 long tons or 12 tonnes or 13 short tons). It was renamed as the Medium Mark I in 1924 as the earlier heavy and medium tanks went out of service and lighter tanks – 5 long tons (5 t; 6 short tons) or less – came into service.

=== World War II ===
In World War 2, Light, Medium, and Heavy tank applications to different roles were incorporated into doctrine. In the US, light tanks were expected to be used ahead of the main force, medium tanks to accompany the main thrust of attack, and by-their-nature slower heavy tanks being brought up to deal with any more significant opposition. In practice, US heavy tanks saw limited use due to the capacity limits of most dockyard equipment, preventing their delivery to the theatres of operation. This left a role-based classification, the tank destroyer, to evolve from the need to move artillery pieces and set ambushes for axis tanks. A variety of super-heavy tanks were also designed during World War II, although none ever saw combat or construction due to their impracticality.

The British retained some light tanks from the interbellum period, but otherwise moved to a new role based classification scheme.

Other countries started to move to a more role-based approach, for example, by categorizing tanks into cruiser tanks, breakthrough tanks, and fast tanks. The tanks themselves are still often referred to by light, medium and heavy weights based on the actual weight or the equivalent role (for example, a cruiser tank may be light weight but is used in a similar role to a medium). This continued until multi-role vehicles became available.

=== Modern ===
Light tanks, such as the PT-76, continue to play an important role in tank warfare, however many are being replaced with IFVs and armoured cars. The light tank is still more used than main battle tanks in many armies for various reasons: financial, terrain-related (muddy landscape and dense foliage), or doctrinal dependence on airborne divisions. Many light vehicles, such as the British Combat Vehicle Reconnaissance (Tracked) series (FV101 Scorpion, FV107 Scimitar) are used primarily for reconnaissance, but retain the tank capabilities.

Medium and Heavy tanks were used in the early stages of the cold war, but have gradually been phased out by the multi-role Main Battle Tank. Heavy tanks grew to the point of being logistically problematic, such as the Conqueror and IS-3, while the MBT became capable of filling their battlefield role in a comparatively Medium form-factor. In most cases, the Heavy tanks grew so large that they could not be transported by rail, and could not be supported by common bridges.

== Role classifications ==
Many types are also described by their tactical role, which depends on contemporary military doctrine. For instance, 'infantry' and 'cruiser' tanks are British classifications of the 1930s and '40s; 'infantry', 'fast', and 'breakthrough' are Soviet types of the same time period.

British and Soviet tacticians up to the time of the Second World War classified tanks into three major roles: infantry, light, and cavalry. Infantry tanks supported infantry units, to integrally support dismounted infantry actions. Light tanks performed the traditional cavalry role of scouting and screening. Cavalry or "cruiser" tank units were meant to exploit breakthroughs and fight other armoured formations.

As role based classifications evolved, the role of light tanks was overtaken by other vehicles, such as carriers and scout cars. The infantry and cruiser tank roles were combined in British use late in the war to form the Universal tank concept. This was made possible as increased engine power provided the capability to sufficiently armour a cruiser tank, the Centurion, to undertake both roles. Centurion entered service just as the war came to an end.

Post-war, tanks were similarly made capable of fulfilling multiple roles on the battlefield, resulting in the designation Main Battle Tank.

=== World War I ===
Initially on the very first tanks, two types with two roles were provided: the 'males', armed with two naval 6-pounder (57 mm) guns and machine guns, and 'females', armed with only machine guns that supported the 'males'.

Later tanks armed with a single gun in one side sponson and machine guns on the other were named "hermaphrodites".

=== World War II ===
Tank models were developed before and during World War II according to different philosophies, with different combinations of armour, mobility, and armament. Each major nation developed its own doctrine of tank use, and therefore different tank models to suit. New doctrines explored the role of the tank as a fast-striking unit.

Tank doctrine in the UK declared that one group of tanks would accompany infantry in a similar role to World War I, while another group of 'cruiser' tanks would then exploit a breakthrough, in a role similar to light cavalry. In the USSR, 1930s tank doctrine specified three groups of tanks: one 'breakthrough' tank in the infantry support role, one tactical breakthrough tank to clear the combat area, and a 'fast tank' for operational maneuver. In Germany, the ideas of Heinz Guderian established the need for unified tank formations, but with a mixture of armaments for differing roles.

In the United States, doctrine evolved so that the main purpose of the tank was to provide infantry support and exploitation of breakthroughs. The antitank role was given to tank destroyers. There was no analog to the cruiser tank in pre-war US doctrine. There were those within the US Army which advocated a more modern force with tanks in the cavalry role, but their suggestions were not put into place by the time of the US's entry into World War II.

==== Infantry tank ====
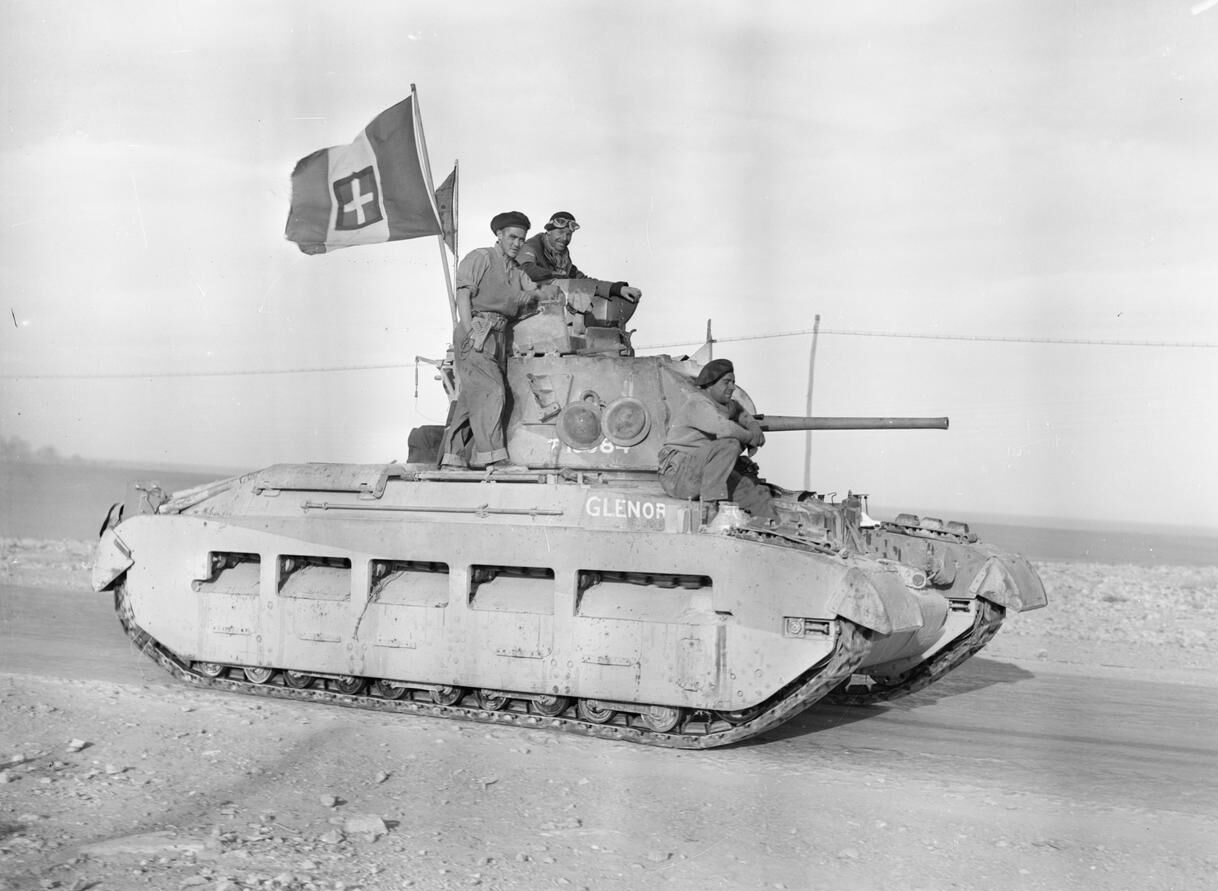
A British Matilda tank displaying a captured Italian flag

The idea for this tank was developed during World War I by the British and French. The infantry tank was designed to work in concert with infantry in the assault, moving mostly at a walking pace, which allowed it to carry heavy armour to survive defensive fire. Its main purposes were to clear the battlefield of obstacles, suppress or destroy defenders, and protect the infantry on their advance into and through enemy lines by giving mobile overwatch and cover. The British came back to the concept in the pre-Second World War era, and one of the best-known infantry tanks was the Matilda II of World War II.

==== Cruiser tank ====
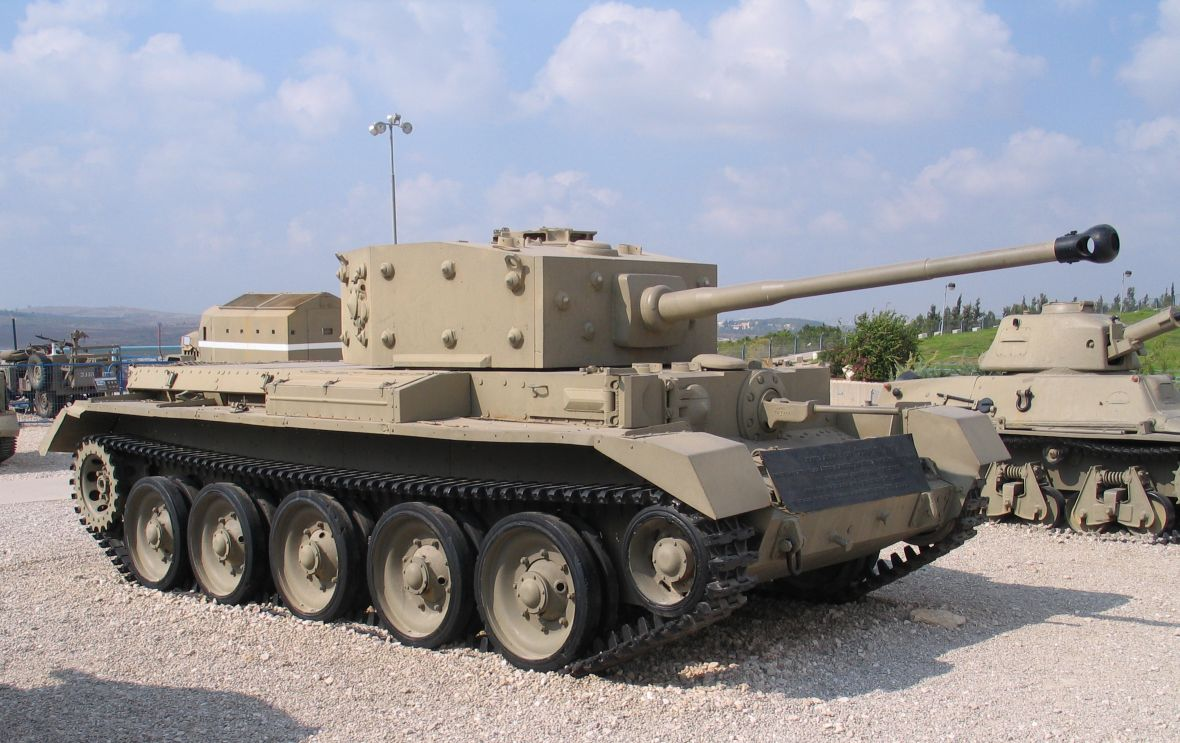
Cromwell tank

A cruiser tank, or cavalry tank, was designed to move fast and exploit penetrations of the enemy front. The idea originated in "Plan 1919", a British plan to break the trench deadlock of World War I in part via the use of high-speed tanks. This concept was later implemented in the "fast tanks" pioneered by J. Walter Christie.

They were used by the United Kingdom during World War II. Cruiser tanks were designed to complement infantry tanks, exploiting gains made by the latter to attack and disrupt the enemy rear areas. In order to give them the required speed, cruiser designs sacrificed armour compared to the infantry tanks.

The Soviet fast tank (bistrokhodniy tank, or BT tank) classification also came out of the infantry/cavalry concept of armoured warfare and formed the basis for the British cruisers after 1936. The T-34 was a development of this line of tanks as well, though their armament, armour, and all-round capability places them firmly in the medium tank category.

==== Flame tank ====
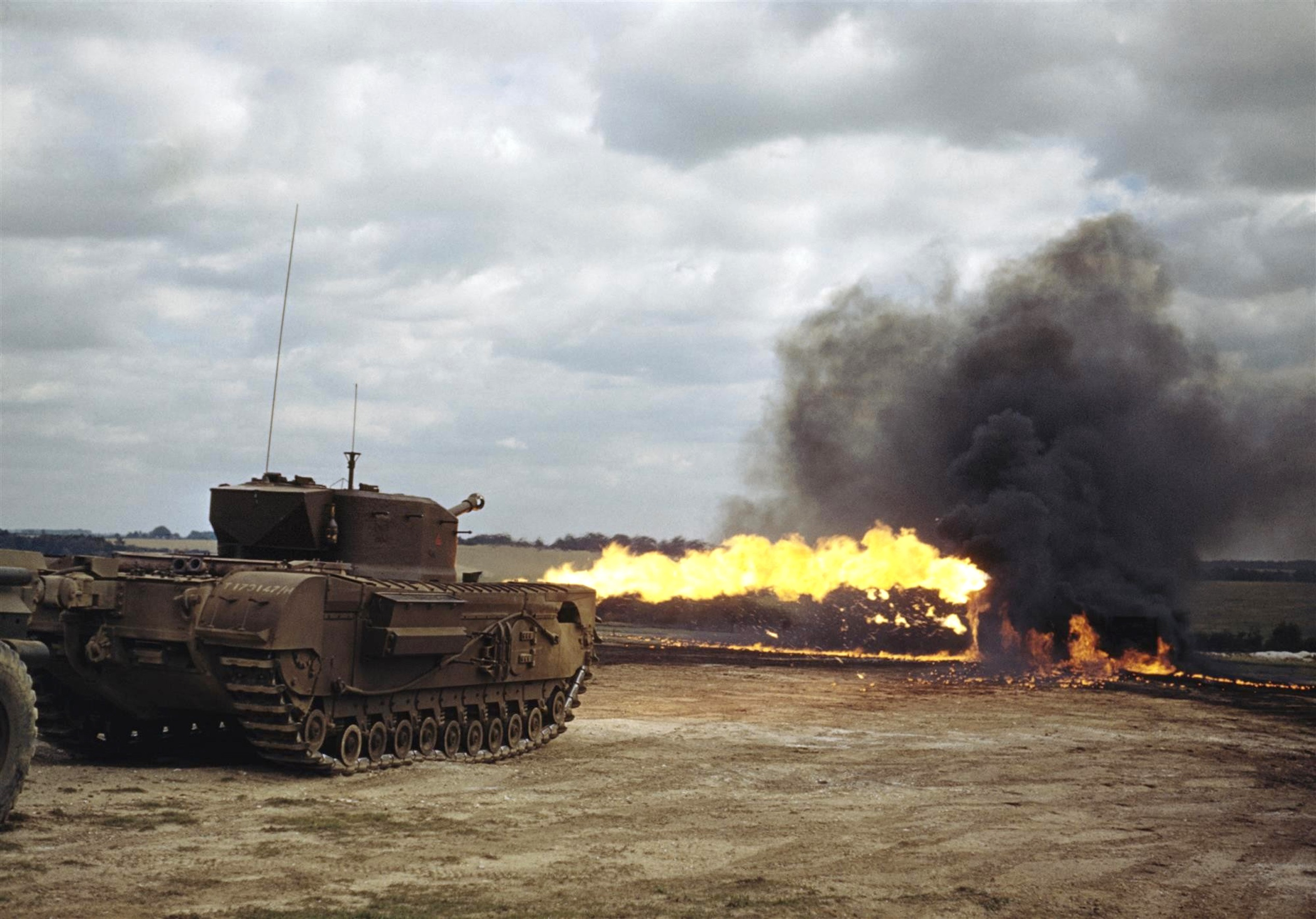
Churchill Crocodile flame tank

A flame tank is a tank equipped with a flamethrower, most commonly used to supplement combined arms attacks against fortifications, confined spaces, or other obstacles. The type only reached significant use in the Second World War, during which the United States, Soviet Union, Germany, Italy, Japan and the United Kingdom (including members of the British Commonwealth) all produced flamethrower-equipped tanks.

A number of production methods were used. The flamethrowers used were either modified versions of existing infantry flame weapons (Flammpanzer I and II) or specially designed (Flammpanzer III). They were mounted externally (Flammpanzer II), replaced existing machine gun mounts, or replaced the tank's main armament (Flammpanzer III). Fuel for the flame weapon was either carried inside the tank, in armoured external storage, or in some cases in a special trailer behind the tank (Churchill Crocodile).

Flame tanks have been superseded by thermobaric weapons such as the Russian TOS-1.

=== Modern ===
==== Main battle tank ====
Advances in tank design, armour, and engine technology allowed tank designers to significantly increase and combine the capabilities of tanks, combining speed, defensive armour, and attacking power, allowing one tank to undertake multiple battlefield roles. Although these advances could sometimes be made without resorting to heavier designs, weights did gradually increase.

High-explosive anti-tank (HEAT) ammunition was a threat to tanks and could penetrate steel armour thicker than was practical to put on a tank. Advances such as the British-designed Chobham armour limit the effectiveness of weaker HEAT rounds, but the vulnerability still remained.

On 7 November 1950, the US Ordnance Committee Minutes (OCM), order #33476, ceased utilizing the terms heavy, medium, and light tanks and redesignated tanks by the gun system, e.g. 90 mm Gun Tank M48 Patton, etc. with heavy gun tanks (120 mm or 4.724 in), medium gun tanks (90 mm or 3.543 in), and light gun tanks (76 mm or 2.992 in), although these gun terms were often still shortened to simply heavy, medium, and light tanks.

The term "main battle tank" (MBT), in the US, was first generally applied in 1960 to an all-purpose tank, armed and protected as a heavy tank, but with the mobility of the medium tank (the introduction of M60). The MBT would form the backbone of modern ground forces.

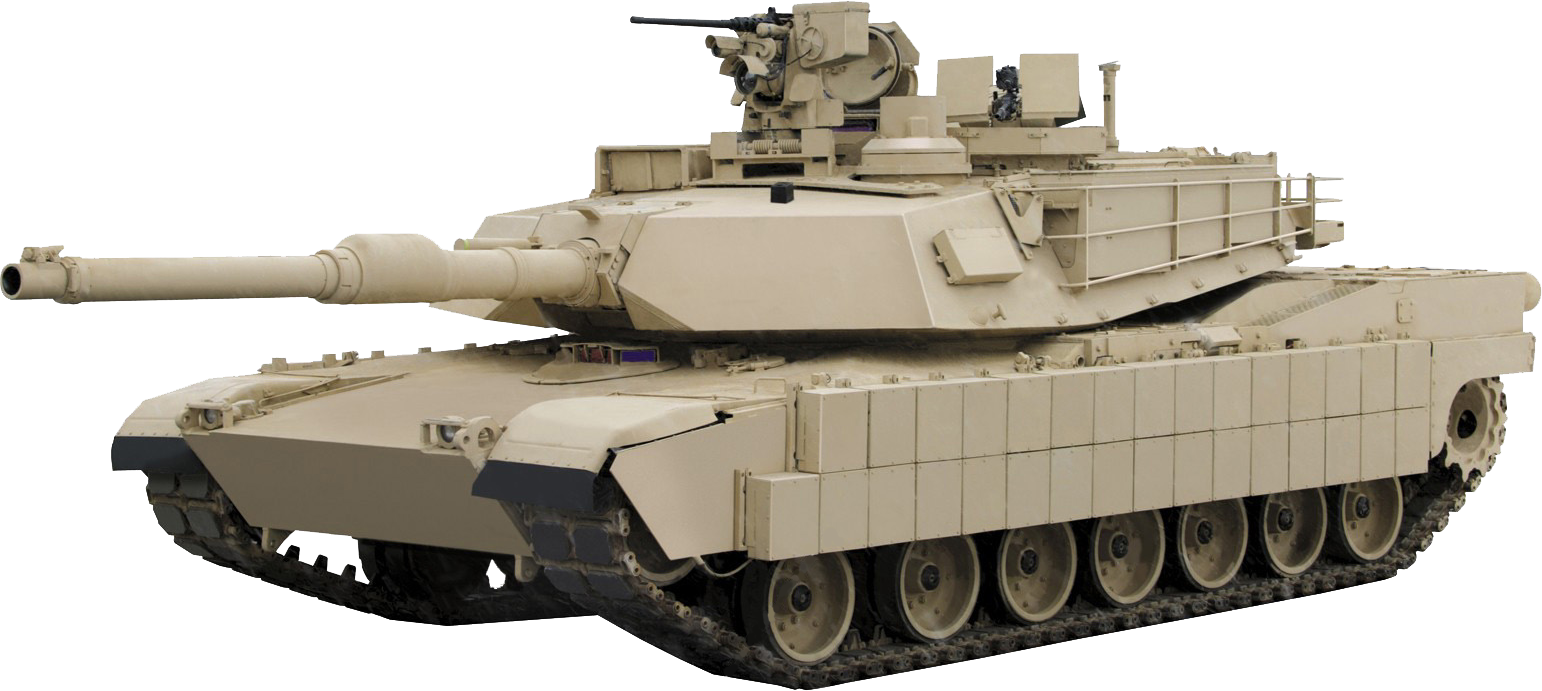
United States Army M1A2 Abrams main battle tank, fitted with reactive armor, as per the recent TUSK refit

Many Cold War MBTs evolved more or less directly from late World War II medium tank designs. However, in the 1960s and 1970s, a generation of purpose-designed main battle tanks appeared, starting with the British Chieftain tank. These vehicles are less obviously influenced by wartime templates (the Chieftain, for example), weighing as much as a World War II heavy tank and possessing far greater firepower and armour, while retaining the mobility of the previous Centurion design. Similarly, the US M1 Abrams series, the German Leopard 2, the British Challenger 1, French Leclerc, Indian Arjun and Russian T-90 tanks are all main battle tanks. The defining feature of the main battle tank type is neither its weight, mobility, nor firepower, but instead the idea that only one type of tracked armoured vehicle is required to carry out the roles of breakthrough, exploitation and infantry support.

== Specialist tank ==
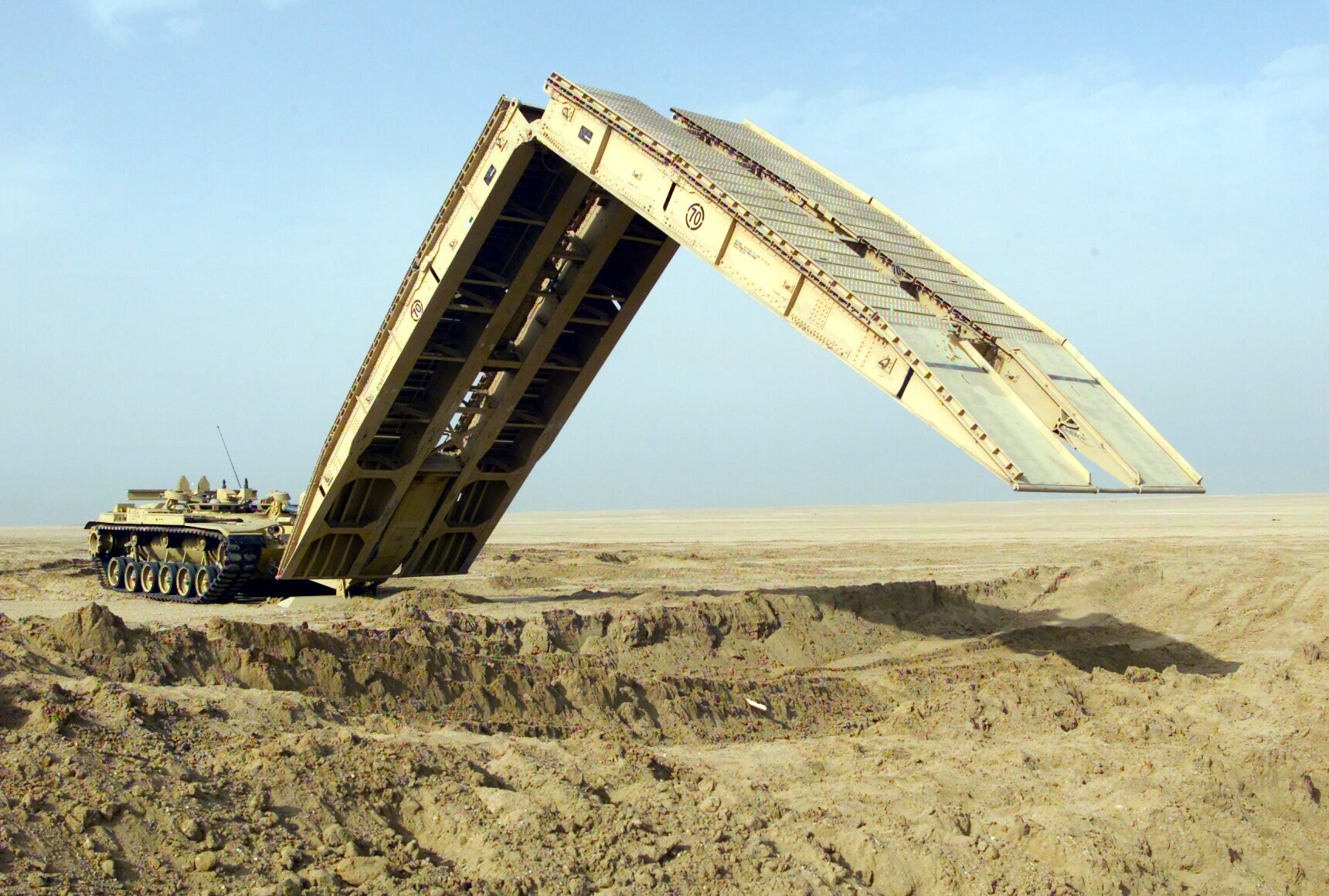
An M60A1 Armored Vehicle Launched Bridge (AVLB) deploying its scissors-type bridge

Tanks have often been modified for special purposes. The most common is armoured recovery vehicles, used during combat for recovery or repair of battle-damaged and inoperable armoured fighting vehicles. Another common use is to provide armoured capability for combat engineers. These include tanks carrying large-calibre demolition guns, with flails or ploughs for mine-clearing, or flame tanks armed with flamethrowers. The tank occasionally may lose its weapons and the chassis alone may be used, as in bridge-laying tanks.

Another important modification was the amphibious tank. These designs were modified with waterproofing and propulsion systems, to be able to traverse open water.

Many specialist tank roles have been assigned to other vehicle types, though many tank chassis are still used for a wide variety of vehicles, ranging from anti-aircraft roles to bridge layers and firefighting tanks.

Unmodified tanks can be fitted with equipment, such as mine-clearing ploughs, to give them ancillary roles.

Hobart's Funnies were a group of various specialist tanks used in World War II, named after Major General Percy Hobart.

== Tank generations ==
Tanks are sometimes classified as belonging to a particular generation, although the actual definition and membership in these generations is not clearly defined. Soviet and Russian military planners organise tanks into a generation of tanks up to 1945, and four generations of main battle tanks, while Canadian strategists organise main battle tanks into three generations. The military of the People's Republic of China also recognises three generations of its own tanks.

== See also ==
- Armoured fighting vehicle – Combat vehicle with both armament and armour
- Comparison of World War I tanks
- History of the tank – Chronicle of armoured combat vehicles
- List of main battle tanks by country
- List of main battle tanks by generation – Chronological listing of main battle tanks
- Super-heavy tank – Extremely large or weighty tracked fighting vehicle
- Tanks in the Cold War
- Tanks of the post–Cold War era

== Notes ==
Notes

Citations
