= Albert Gerald Stern =

British banker (1878–1966)

Sir Albert Gerald Stern
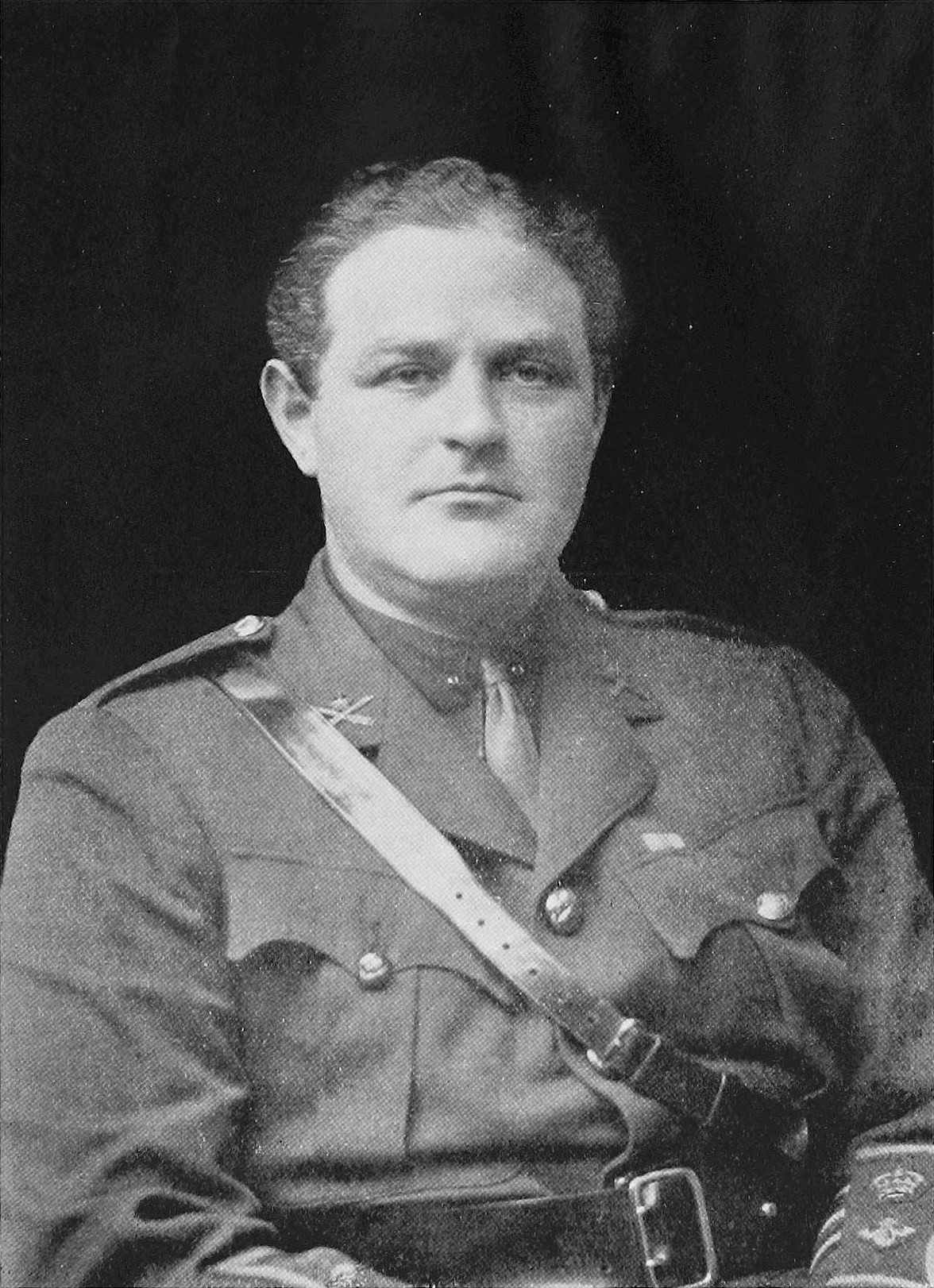
- Born: 24 September 1878; Knightsbridge, London
- Died: 2 January 1966 (aged 87); Teston, Kent, England
- Resting place: The Parish Church of Saint Peter and Saint Paul Teston; 51.255035466036226, 0.44236990088165834
- Other names: Bertie
- Education: Eton College
- Alma mater: Christ Church, Oxford
- Occupation: Merchant Banker
- Spouse: Helen Stern
- Parent(s): James Julius and Lucy Stern

Sir Albert Gerald Stern KBE CMG DL (24 September 1878 – 2 January 1966) was a banker who became the Secretary of the Landship Committee during World War I, where his organisational ability assisted the Committee in creating the first British tank.

During the war he came into conflict with the War Office but had the advantage of direct access to the Prime Minister, and no civil service career to protect. He was removed from direct involvement in the production of tanks and sidelined.

== Early life ==
Born the second son of James Julius Stern, a part of the Jewish European Stern Banking dynasty, Albert Stern was educated at Eton and Christ Church, Oxford before entering the family business, becoming known in the City of London as "The Holy Terror". Although he negotiated a large loan to the sultan of Morocco, Albert Stern had no real flair as a merchant banker.

At the outbreak of the First World War he tried to join the armed forces but experienced difficulty doing so due to a weak ankle. He offered to supply the Admiralty with an armoured car at his own expense and was eventually commissioned as a lieutenant in the Royal Naval Volunteer Reserve at the end of 1914, when he joined the Armoured Car Division of the Royal Naval Air Service.

== Landship Committee ==
Stern originally became involved with landships as an assistant to Flight Commander Thomas Hetherington, RNAS. In 1915 he became Secretary of the Landship Committee. In February 1916 David Lloyd George appointed him head of what became known as the Mechanical Warfare Supply Department, under the Ministry of Munitions, which controlled the procurement and supply of tanks. Stern was transferred to the Army where he eventually attained the rank of lieutenant-colonel. Stern believed in the application of business methods to war production with the minimum of interference from professional soldiers.

Stern and the chairman of the committee, Eustace d'Eyncourt (Director of Naval Construction and designer of many of the Royal Navy's latest ships), attempted to use their influence with Lloyd George to influence the employment of tanks. However, neither had a military background nor had they spent much time on the frontline, and GHQ became irritated at their interference in their affairs.

Stern was removed from his post and given the task of co-ordinating an Allied tank, which resulted in the Tank Mark VIII, a few of which were built towards the end of the war.

== Special Vehicle Development Committee ==
Until the creation in 1939 of the Ministry of Supply, the War Office had issued specifications for weapons it required and then chose from the proposals submitted in response by manufacturers. In the case of tank production there were only two manufacturers with the required skills: Vickers and the Royal Arsenal, Woolwich.

Leslie Burgin, the Minister of Supply, was worried about the ongoing expansion of the German armoured forces and realised that he needed the help of an expert in tank warfare who could understand the army's requirements. He therefore selected Stern, who was now 62. Stern was on the boards of the Midland Bank, the Clydesdale Bank, and the Bank of Romania. He was also helping to prevent the Germans' attempts to take over the Romanian oil industry.

When he was approached to talk to Burgin about tanks, he seized the opportunity since he too had been worrying about the type of tank that the army would need in the forthcoming war. He met General Sir Maurice Taylor, the Ministry's chief military advisor, but the meeting did not go well since Taylor said he was satisfied with the state of Britain's tank development. However, Taylor's assistant, General Davidson, told Stern of his concerns about the lack of investment in tank production in a private meeting.

When Stern reported back to Burgin, he appointed Stern the head of the Special Vehicle Development Committee. Stern then began selecting the members of the committee, including many people who had been part of the development of the tank during World War I, including former Director of Naval Construction, Eustace d'Eyncourt, Sir Ernest Swinton (now a director of Citroën), engine designer Harry Ricardo, and the gearbox and transmission expert Major W G Wilson. Unsurprisingly they got the nickname "The Old Gang". It soon became obvious that the SVDC lacked power, but General Ironside, Chief of the Imperial General Staff, was helpful. Aware of the inadequacy of the tank designs currently in service, he assisted the committee in finding accommodation where they could produce an initial tank specification.

=== TOG 1 & TOG 2 ===
Together they proposed the development of a "heavy tank" design, the TOG 1, an acronym for "The Old Gang", which was the Committee's nickname for themselves. Production was carried out by another of the first tank's developers and builders, Sir William Tritton of Foster's of Lincoln.

Designed with trench crossing abilities to the fore and the capability to carry infantry as well, the design was a large hull with side doors supported on broad tracks, with a small turret on top. The prototype TOG 1 was delivered in October 1940. After problems with the electro-mechanical drive, it was converted to hydraulic drive, a process that took until May 1943 after which it was called TOG 1A. The prototype was sent to Chobham and then seems to have disappeared into history.

The second design to come out of the SVDC, the TOG 2 was similar to the TOG 1 and kept many of its features, but mounted the latest tank gun, the QF 17-pounder (76.2 mm). Instead of the track path arrangement of the TOG 1 which was like that of the First World War British tanks, the track path was lower on the return run and the doors were above the tracks. It was ordered in 1940, and built by Foster's of Lincoln, and the prototype ran for the first time in March 1941.

Although fitted with the same electro-mechanical drive as the TOG 1, the TOG 2 used twin generators and no problems were reported. It was modified to include among other things a change from the unsprung tracks for a torsion bar suspension and as the TOG 2* was successfully trialled in May 1943. No further development occurred, although a shorter version, the TOG 2 (R) was mooted. The TOG 2 can be seen at the Bovington Tank Museum.

Unfortunately, once Winston Churchill – with whom Stern had had a blazing row in 1917 – took over as prime minister on 10 May 1940, Stern and the work of the SVDC were sidelined. Despite this, the SVDC went on to develop specifications for a cruiser tank which was vigorously promoted by Stern.

The Tog design was also sidelined by the good cross-country performance of the Churchill tank which had been designed by Harland and Wolff (and subsequently improved by Vauxhall Motors) to cross shelled ground.

== Honours ==
Stern was made a Companion of the Order of St Michael and St George in the 1917 New Year Honours, and was made a Knight Commander of the Order of the British Empire in the 1918 Birthday Honours.

He became High Sheriff of Kent and a Deputy Lieutenant for Kent in 1952.

== Personal life ==
In 1922 Stern married Helen Orr-Lewis, daughter of Sir Frederick Orr-Lewis, 1st Baronet, upon his permission after meeting her in the south of France on diplomatic business, since she was underage at the time. They had two sons and two daughters. His brother, Sir Frederick Claude Stern, was an accomplished horticulturist and botanist.
