= Medium tank =

Classification of tank

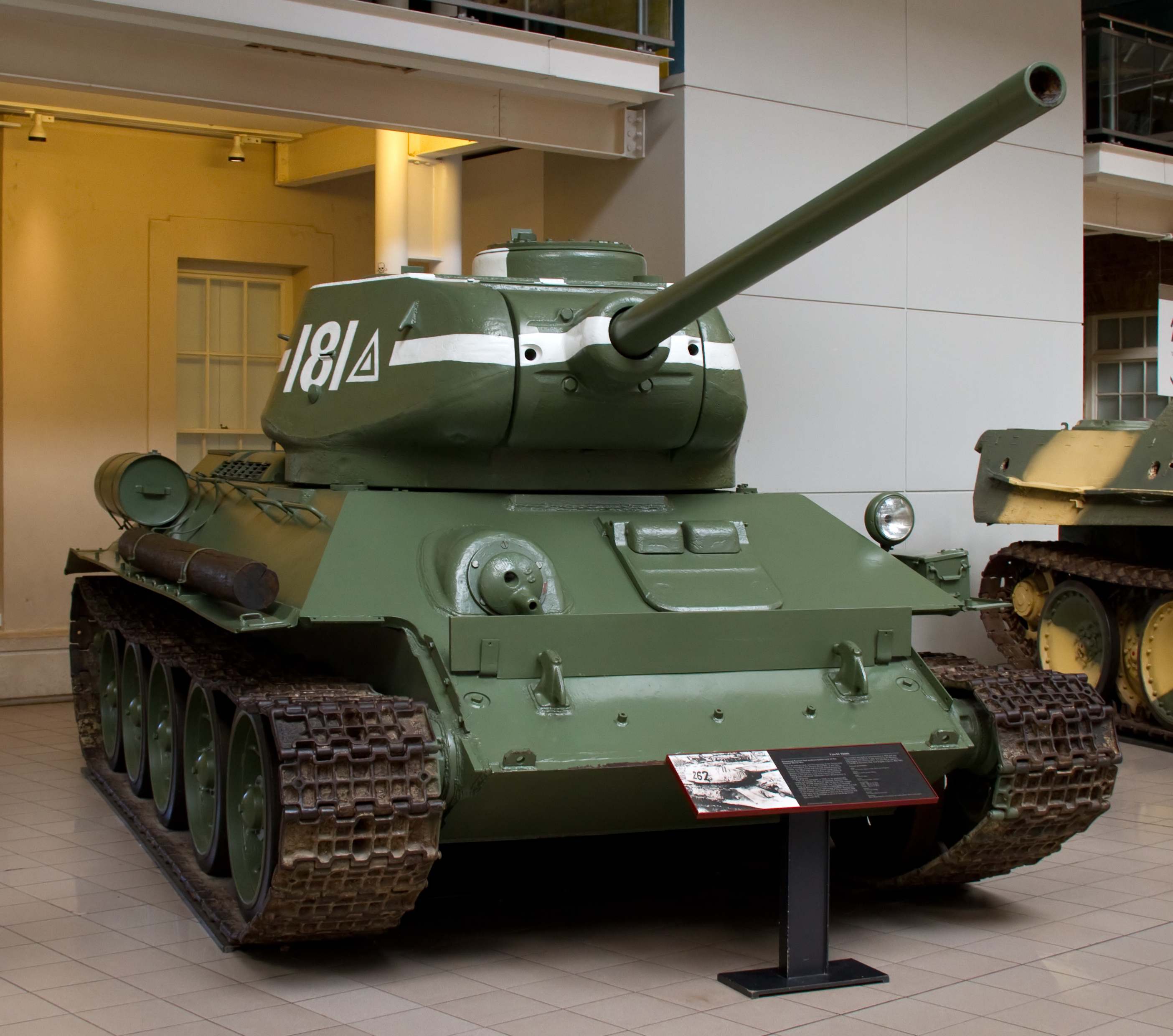
A Soviet T-34-85 medium tank

A medium tank is a classification of tanks, particularly prevalent during World War II, which represented a compromise between the mobility oriented light tanks and the armour and armament oriented heavy tanks. A medium tank's classification is not based on weight, but on tactical usage and intended purpose; for instance the German Panzerkampfwagen V Panther medium tank has a mass similar to contemporary Allied heavy tanks. The most widely produced, cost effective and successful tanks of World War II (the German Panzer IV, the Soviet T-34, and the American M4 Sherman) were all medium tank designs. Many of the medium tank lines became what are called main battle tanks in most countries.

== History ==
The first tanks to carry the name "Medium" appeared in the First World War with the British Medium Mark A Whippet. It was smaller, lighter and faster than the British heavy tanks of the time and only carried machine guns.

The medium tank doctrine came into use in the interwar period. Its existence outlasted the super-heavy tank and the heavy tank and gradually transitioned into the main battle tank.

Medium tanks of the interwar period included the British Vickers Medium Mark II and the Soviet multi-turreted T-28. In the period leading up to World War II, the British stopped using the term Medium for their tanks as the new philosophy of 'Cruiser tank' and 'Infantry tank' which defined tanks by role rather than size came into use.

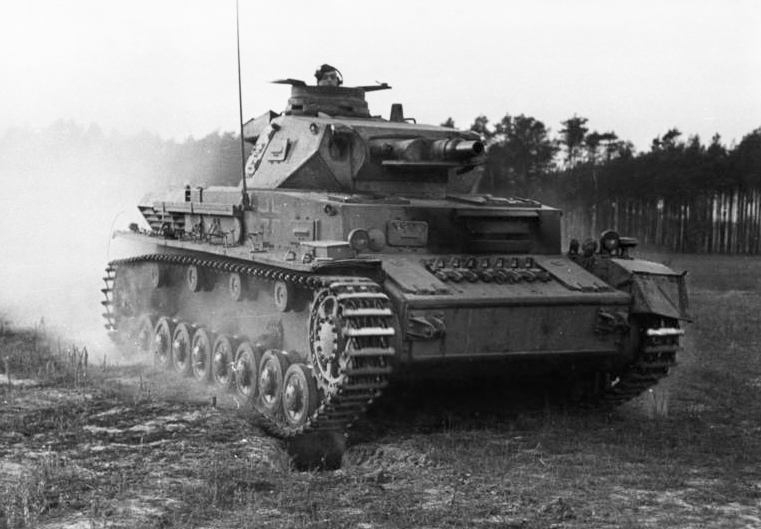
The German Panzer IV medium tank proved to be an adaptable design which was progressively upgraded during the Second World War with extra armour and better guns fitted

There were medium tanks that focused on anti-infantry capabilities (such as in World War II: the initial short-barrel gun Panzer IV, and the initial 75 mm gun M4 Sherman), and medium tanks which were more focused on the anti-tank role, mounting high-velocity tank guns. The French cavalry tanks (Chars de Cavalerie) such as the SOMUA S35 focused on speed in addition to power and protection of the other designs. They were similar to what other countries called medium tanks.

When Soviet tank designers were preparing a successor to the BT tank series, they sought to combine its mobility with improved armor and the firepower of a 76mm gun that, at the time, was more typical of heavier tanks. The result was the T-34 medium tank, an overall well-balanced design which proved essential at slowing and eventually blunting the initial German advance during Operation Barbarossa. The lessons of Blitzkrieg, first employed by the Germans and eventually adopted by other nations, found their best expression in formations of mutually-supporting medium tanks and motorised infantry. The traditional view of infantry and cavalry tank roles was rendered obsolete.

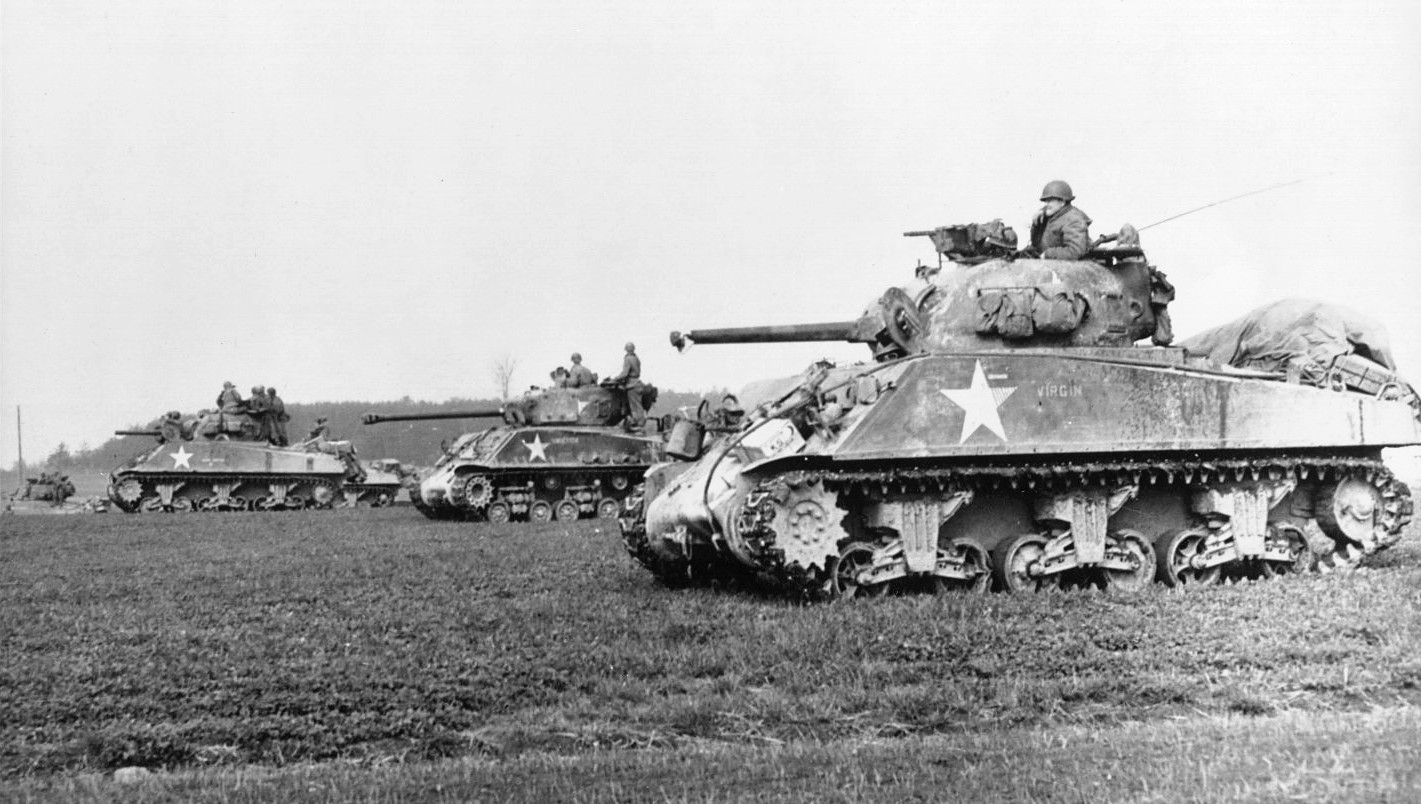
Sherman medium tank from World War II, the workhorse of U.S. armoured forces

Both the Soviet Union and the United States benefited from their industrial capacity to manufacture a well-balanced medium tank in very large numbers — around 57,000 T-34 and 49,234 M4 Sherman tanks were built during the war.

=== Cold War ===
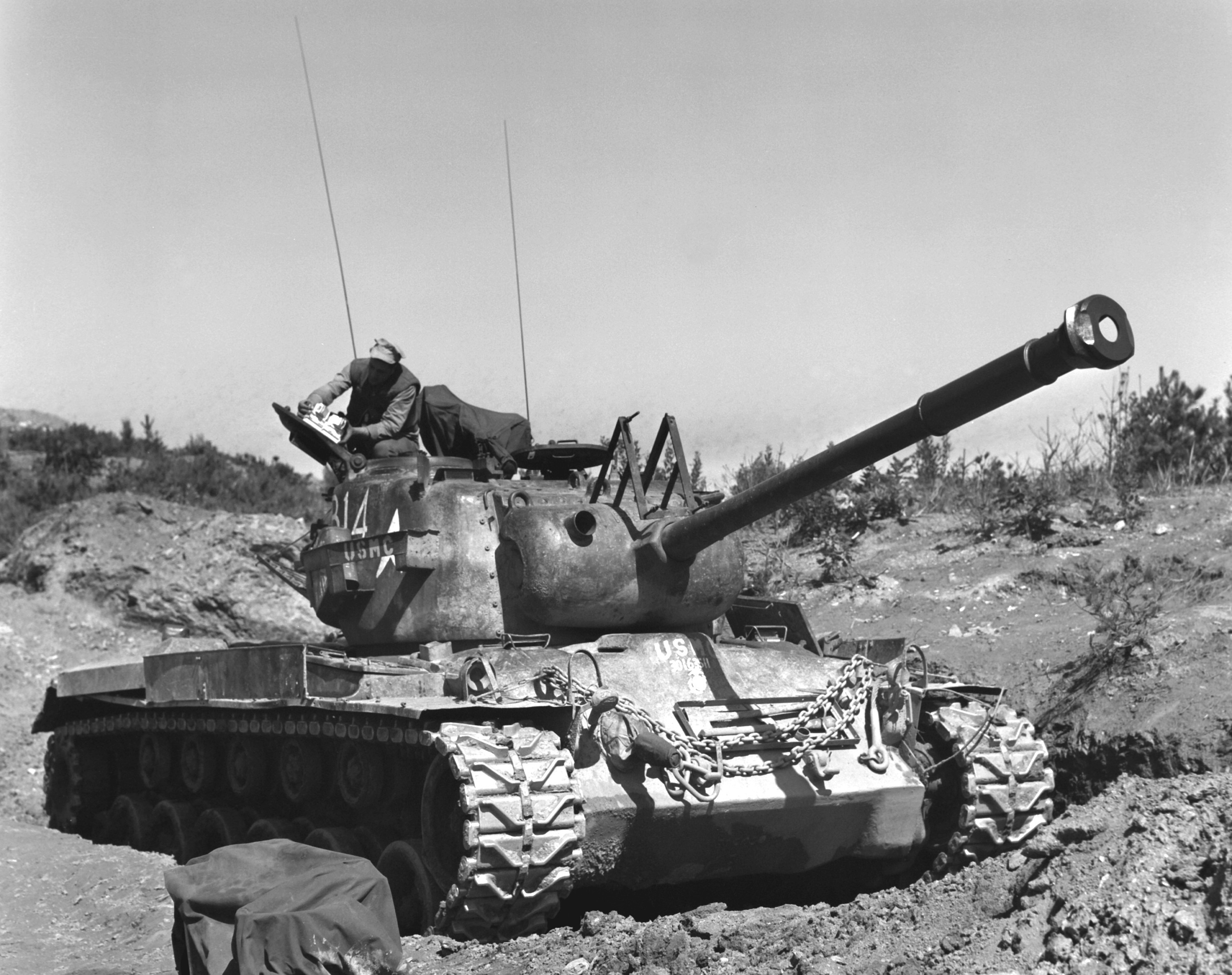
American M46 Patton medium tank in the Korean War.

During and after World War II, the roles of light tanks were gradually taken over by less-expensive armoured cars and specialised reconnaissance vehicles. Heavy tanks, having shown their limitations in combat, experienced a limited post-war arms race of progressively more heavily armed and armoured designs. With the rise of more sophisticated anti-tank missile weapons, to which heavy tanks had demonstrated high vulnerability, these too were eventually phased out. With advances in technology, aspects such as mobility, armour and weaponry pushed the medium tank to form the core of a country's armoured fighting capability, eventually merging into the main battle tank. Simpler and more economical self-propelled guns, and later anti-tank guided missiles, came to fulfill some fire-support and anti-tank roles, thus shifting the tactical approach how tanks were used.

Although the term "medium tank" classification has largely fallen out of use after World War II, the term is informally used to describe some first and second-generation main battle tanks which fall between 20 and 50 tons, such as the Leopard 1 and T-72 each of which weigh around 40 short tons, while third and subsequent generations have increased markedly in weight and have included some of the heaviest main battle tanks such as the M1 Abrams which is over 60 short tons. In the 1990s the "medium" main battle tanks still proved useful, such as the Canadian Leopard 1 tanks deployed to Kosovo in 1999 which were much better suited to the poor roads and soft ground than the French armoured cars there, but were still able to move along narrow streets and over lighter bridge classifications than the much heavier M1 Abrams tanks used by the Americans.

== Role ==
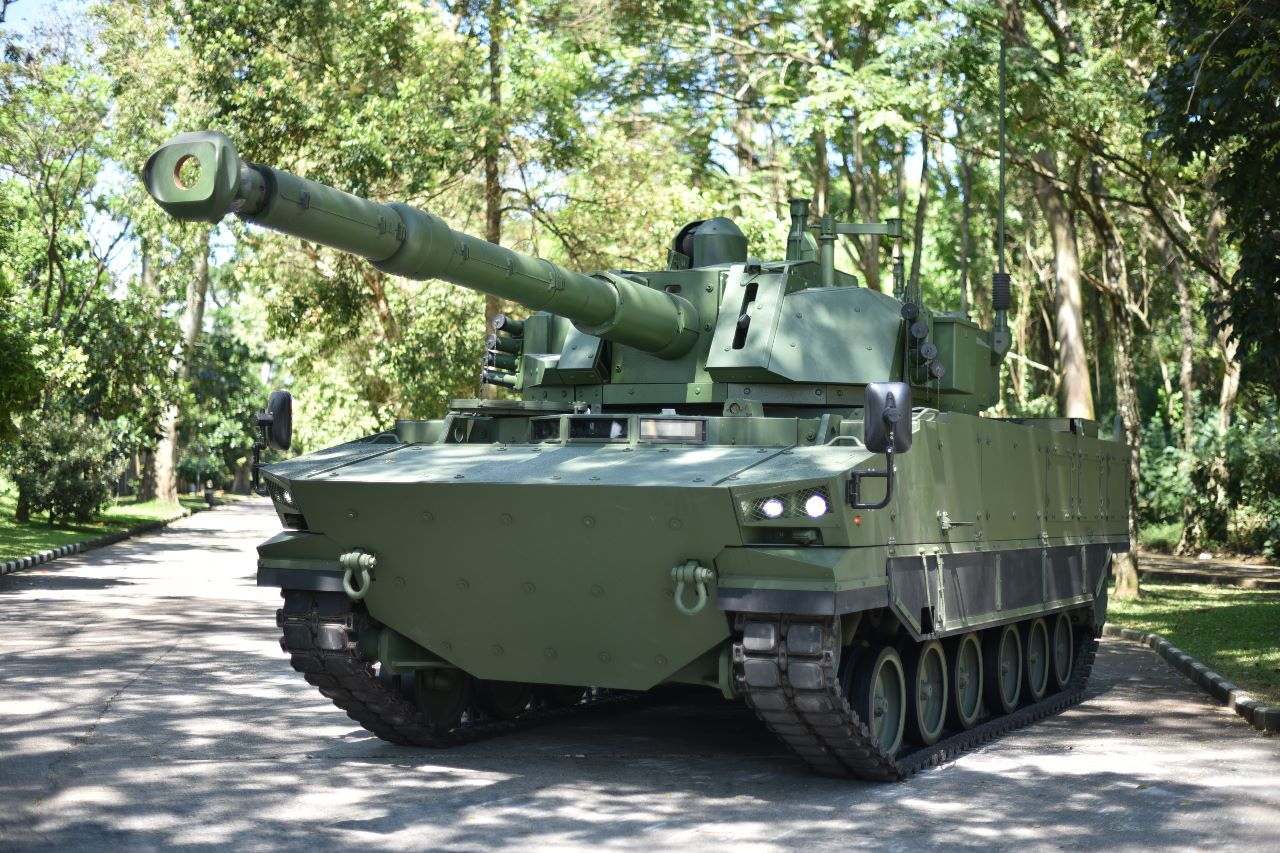
The Harimau or Kaplan MT is a modern medium tank made in Indonesia and Türkiye.

The role of medium tanks started with a prioritisation of speed. Medium tanks could travel faster, but needed help to cross trenches, where heavy tanks were large enough to cross unaided. In British use, this evolved into the Cruiser tank class, while other tank doctrines formed around the medium tank making the main advance.

In this later use, medium tanks represent the designer's intent of producing a successful balance of firepower, mobility, and protection. Medium tanks aim to be suitable to the widest variety of roles, with less reliance on other types of tank during normal operations.

== See also ==
- Light tank
- Heavy tank
- Super-heavy tank
- Main battle tank
