= TOG1 =

Tank, Heavy, TOG I
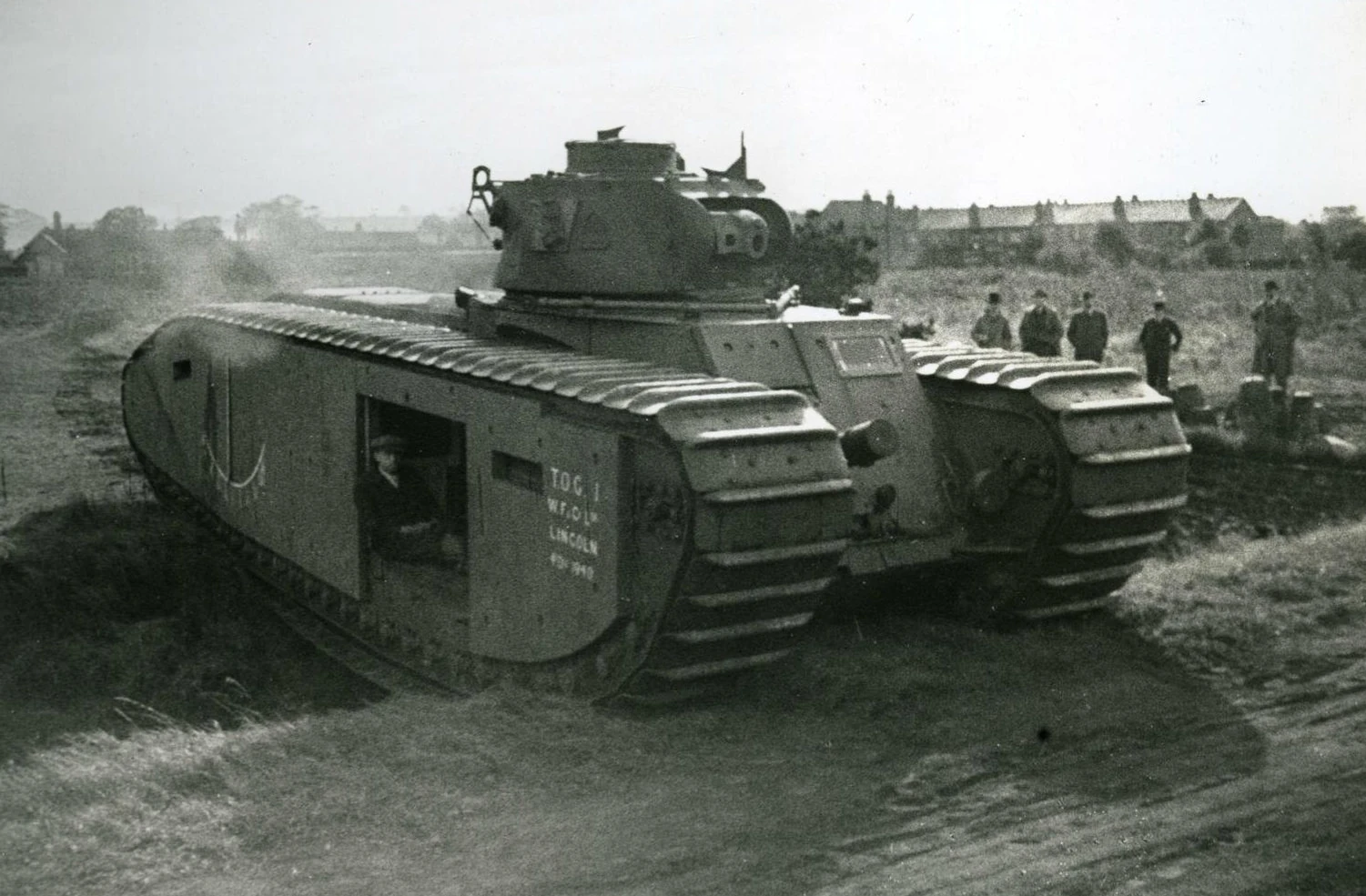
- TOG1 tank during trials, shown straddling a ditch
- Type: Super-heavy tank
- Place of origin: United Kingdom

Production history
- Manufacturer: William Foster and Co. Ltd.
- No. built: 1

Specifications (as built)
- Mass: 80 long tons (90 short tons; 81 t)
- Length: 10.1 m (33 ft 2 in)
- Width: 3.1 m (10 ft 2 in)
- Height: 3 m (9 ft 10 in)
- Crew: 8 (commander, gunner, loader, driver, 4x sponson gunners)
- Armour: 62 mm (2.4 in)
- Main armament: 75 mm (2.95 inch) howitzer
- Secondary armament: QF 2 pdr
- Engine: Paxman-Ricardo diesel 12TP driving English Electric generator 600 hp (450 kW)
- Transmission: 2 English Electric motors
- Suspension: Unsprung
- Maximum speed: 14 km/h (8.7 mph)

The Tank, Heavy, TOG 1 was a prototype British super-heavy tank produced in the early part of the Second World War in the expectation that battlefields might end up like those of the First World War. It was designed so it could cross churned-up countryside and trenches. A single prototype was built, and followed by an improved model (the TOG 2), but interest faded with the successful performance of another cross-country design, the Churchill tank, and the mobile war that was being fought.

== History ==
In July 1939, the Special Vehicle Development Committee was drawn up for future tank designs suitable for Great War conditions under Sir Albert Gerald Stern; who had been on the original Landship Committee and head of the Tank Supply Depot during World War I. The committee included others who had been instrumental in the development of the tank during the Great War: former Director of Naval Construction, Sir Eustace Tennyson-d'Eyncourt, Major-General (retired) Sir Ernest Swinton (Note: Colonel Commandant of the Royal Tank Corps, 1934 to 1938), engine designer Harry Ricardo, and the gearbox and transmission expert Major Walter Gordon Wilson. Unsurprisingly, they got the nickname "The Old Gang", and the initials TOG were applied to their designs.

Together, they proposed the development of a heavy tank design, which they entrusted to another of the first tank's developers and builder of the first tank, Sir William Tritton of Fosters of Lincoln.

Their specification was comprehensive. As well as being able to operate across ground waterlogged and broken up by shelling, it was expected to resist 47 mm anti-tank guns and 105 mm field guns or howitzers at 100 yd (91 m). The main armament would be a field gun mounted in the front — effective against 7-foot (2.1 m) thick reinforced concrete — and two 2-pounder guns, the latter in sponsons. For use against infantry, there would be Besa machine guns covering "all arcs" — one firing forward, one in each sponson, and one firing to the rear. The design was later revised with smaller sponsons containing only the Besa machine guns. To provide cover, four 2-inch (51 mm) smoke mortars were included.

Design work by Fosters began in December 1939, resulting in a wooden mock-up. Designed with trench crossing abilities to the fore and the capability to carry infantry as well, the design as built was a large hull with side doors supported on broad tracks, with a 2-pdr-gun-armed Matilda II infantry tank turret. The front plate of the hull carried the 75 mm gun and mounting as used on the French Char B1 tank. Neither of the planned sponson designs were ever actually installed on the prototype hull.

It was realised that running the track drive over the top of the hull was not necessary, and work began on a follow-up design in June 1940. The prototype TOG I was delivered in late September 1940. Testing began on September 27th of 1940, with an official public demonstration of the vehicle on October 6th. This public demonstration did not have the QF 2-pounder gun installed in the turret. It is unknown if the gun was installed into the turret at any point during testing.

Due to the weight, electrical drive was used — the engine driving two generators connected to an electrical motor for each track. The steering wheel was connected to a potentiometer that varied the voltage to the track motors. This strained the drive and track. Due to these problems, it was converted to a hydraulic drive designed by Fluidrive Engineering, a process that took until May 1943, after which it was called TOG 1A. The fluid drive was not satisfactory either. The prototype was sent to Chobham and seems to have no traceable history beyond that point.
