= Flying Elephant =

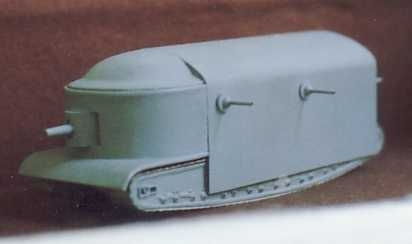
- A 1/48 scale model of the Flying Elephant Design B at The Tank Museum, U.K.
- Type: Super-heavy tank
- Place of origin: United Kingdom

Service history
- Used by: United Kingdom

Specifications
- Mass: c. 100 tons (Design B)
- Length: 8.36 m (27 ft 5 in) (Design B)
- Width: 3 m (9 ft 10 in) (Design B)
- Height: 3 m (9 ft 10 in) (Design B)
- Crew: 8-10
- Main armament: 57mm (6-pdr) gun (Design B); 12-pdr gun (Design A)
- Secondary armament: 6 x .303 Hotchkiss MG (Design B)
- Engine: Two Daimler engines 2×105 hp

The Flying Elephant was a proposed super-heavy tank, planned but never built by the British during World War I.

== Development ==
After the last order for an additional fifty Mark I vehicles in April 1916, it was not certain that any more tanks were to be produced. Everything would depend on the success of the new weapon. William Tritton, co-designer and co-producer of the Mark I, thought he already understood what would prove to be its main weakness. A direct hit by a shell would destroy the vehicle, a major drawback on a battlefield saturated with artillery fire. Tritton decided to design a tank that would be immune to medium artillery fire in April 1916.

Tritton was unsure what this would entail. He did not know how thick the armour should be to ensure complete protection. The same month Lieutenant Kenneth Symes began to test 2 inch (51 mm) armour plate by firing at it with various captured German guns. In June, this programme was expanded by testing several types of plate at Shoeburyness, delivered by armour producer William Beardmore and Company. The Tank Supply Committee approved the production of a prototype on 19 June 1916, but the design was not to be finalised until late August 1916.

== Description ==
Partial drawings have survived and show a vehicle 8.36 m (27 ft 5 in) long and about 3 m (9 ft 10 in) tall and three metres wide, not that much larger than the Mark I. However, the weight was estimated at a hundred tons, much heavier than the 28 tons of the Mark I. The huge increase in weight came from the enormously thick armour for the time (three inches at the front, two inches on the sides). The hull roof consisted of a horizontal half-cylinder, apparently also with a uniform armour two inches thick. The front was a vertical half-cylinder, the transition between the two being a half-dome.

Many sources claim that the main armament, a nose-mounted cannon, was a standard 57-millimetre 6-pounder gun. John Glanfield, in his history The Devil's Chariots, states that it was a 75-millimetre or 13-pounder gun. A 6-pounder main gun for such a heavy machine would have meant half the main armament of contemporary vehicles. The preliminary design, for which partial blueprints are in the Albert Stern archive at King's College London, featured two six-pounders in sponsons either side of a bulbous nose equipped with no fewer than five machine guns. Each side had two machine-gun positions on the flanks, with two more at the rear (the original Foster drawings make this quite clear; the reproduction of the drawings in David Fletcher's book British Tanks 1915–19 is cropped and makes the rear guns ambiguous in nature). Originally, the shell-proof tank was referred to simply as the Heavy Tank, then Foster's Battle Tank. Where the nickname 'Flying Elephant' came from no one knows for sure, though it was probably the result of the trunk-like nose gun, domed front, and enormous bulk combined with a traditional British lightheartedness.

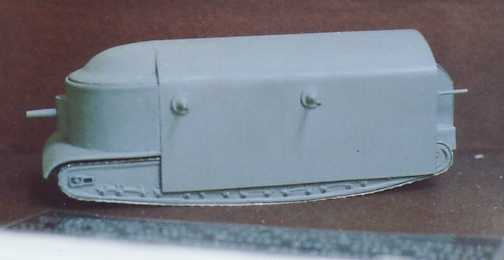
Another view of the model at The Tank Museum, UK.

The tank was fitted with two pairs of caterpillar tracks. The outer tracks resembled those of the Mark I, but were flatter and 61 centimetres wide, while a pair of additional, narrower tracks were fitted to the underside approximately 6 inches higher than the main tracks. They were not intended to be used for normal driving but were to be engaged to give extra traction over rough ground and would have helped to prevent "bellying", i.e. the tank becoming stuck on higher ground between the two outer tracks. All four tracks could be simultaneously driven by two Daimler 105 horsepower (78 kilowatt) engines, positioned on the centre-line, with the inner tracks connected to the main units via dog clutches. Each engine had its own primary gearbox, both of which drove into one single differential. This differential powered two secondary gearboxes, one for each main track. This differs from the solution chosen for the later Whippet in which each engine drove its own track.

== Results ==
It is certain that construction was started at some point, but did not result in a completed prototype. Albert Gerald Stern, the head of the Tank Supply Department, wrote that the War Office ordered the end of the project late in 1916, because it deemed mobility more important than protection.

Historian David Fletcher speculated that the project ran into trouble because the vehicle was grossly underpowered; top speed was estimated at two miles per hour, and it seems unlikely that it could have worked itself free when stuck in mud. The fact that the Mark I series turned out to be a success removed one of Tritton's main motives for building the heavier tank. However, John Glanfield writes that Tritton, in an effort to lighten the machine and make it more practicable, halved the thickness of the armour, reducing the overall weight to a still hefty 50–60 tons. Its appearance would have remained unchanged. Furthermore, the role of the Flying Elephant was changed from a vague 'attack' role to that of a 'tank-buster' when it was feared that the Germans were developing their own armoured fighting vehicles. Apparently, Stern planned to build twenty of the machines, before the project was cancelled.
