= Mendeleev tank =

WW1 tank design

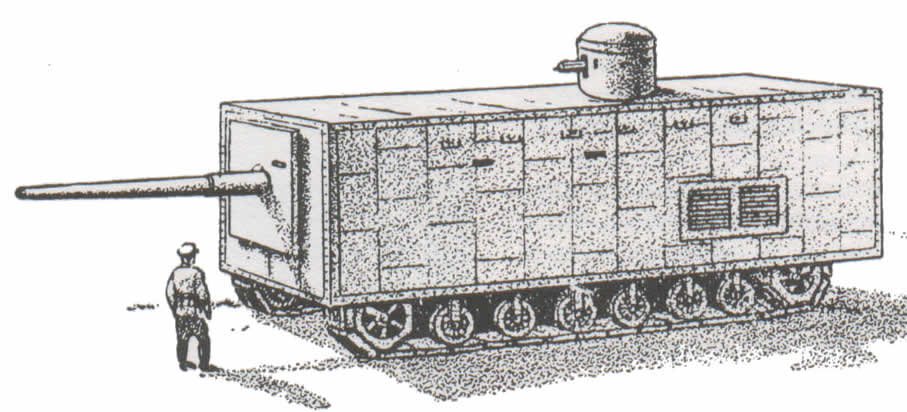
- Artist sketch of the Mendeleev tank
- Type: Tank
- Place of origin: Russian Empire

Production history
- Designer: Vasiliy Dmitriyevich Mendeleev
- Designed: 1911-1916
- Manufacturer: never built
- Unit cost: $ 1,750,000

Specifications
- Mass: Approximately 173.2 tons
- Length: 13 m (42 ft 8 in) (with gun); 10 m (32 ft 10 in) (hull)
- Height: 4.45 m (14 ft 7 in) (machine gun turret up); 3.5 m (11 ft 6 in) (machine gun turret lowered)
- Crew: 11-12
- Armor: Front: 150 mm (5.9 in); Sides and rear: 100 mm (3.9 in)
- Main armament: 120 mm Canet gun (51 shells)
- Secondary armament: 1 × 7.62 mm (0.3 in) PM M1910 machine gun
- Engine: Petrol gasoline engine taken from a submarine 250 hp (190 kW)
- Power/weight: 1.44 hp/t
- Suspension: Pneumatic piston suspension
- Maximum speed: Maximum 24 km/h (15 mph)

The Mendeleev tank was a proposed early tank design by Russian naval engineer Vasiliy Mendeleev, son of Russian scientist Dimitri Mendeleev, who created the modern periodic table. The vehicle was envisioned by Mendeleev during his time working at the Kronshtadt Marine Engineering School in Saint Petersburg, Russia, from 1911 to 1915. Its purported purpose was to be a "landship" immune to all enemy fire and able to cross large battlefields while providing heavy artillery support to troops using a 120 mm gun. The proposed tank was one of the heaviest tank designs of all time; at 173.2 tons it would have been nearly the same weight as the World War II German Panzer VIII Maus superheavy tank.

== Design ==
The Mendeleev tank was of a complete rectangular construction, with its main gun at the front, a machine gun turret mounted to the roof just aft of the middle and tracks protruding directly from the bottom of the hull. The tank was supposed to have a crew of eight operating it.

=== Main Armament ===
The Mendeleev tank was exceptionally well armed for tank design concept at its time. It was slated to have a 120 mm (4.7 in) Canet naval gun with 51 rounds of ammunition, mounted at the front of the tank, way larger than the common calibers of tanks in both World War I and World War II. For comparison, the armament of the British Mark IV tank was two 57 mm QF 6-pounder 6 CWT Hotchkiss guns( that was for the tank “mother” not the mark IV) The gun was able to move left and right as well as elevate and depress. In addition, the gun was supposed to feature a recoil system rather than be placed on a fixed stiff mount, a concept very advanced for the time. The large 120mm Canet gun would be used to provide heavy, direct artillery fire against enemy units, making the Mendeleev tank essentially a mobile artillery/fortress. The tank was also equipped with a Maxim machine gun installed in a small turret that was rotatable as well as being able to be retracted when not in use into the hull of the vehicle.

=== Propulsion ===
Mendeleev designed a novel form of tracked propulsion of the vehicle that differed vastly from other designs of the time. His plans for the vehicle featured a continuous track whose circumference enveloped the entire side of the vehicle. The advanced part of this design was the use of a pneumatic piston suspension that allowed the individual road wheels to be lowered or elevated to a desired height. This would have allowed for very stable traversal of rough or uneven terrain as well as Mendeleev's idea of allowing the tank to completely lower the hull onto the ground, turning the tank into a mobile fortress that could bunker down when need be, protecting the most vulnerable area of the vehicle; the running gear. This feature also was supposed to combine with a special device which could move it on rails, where it could even move by its own, or with the aid of a locomotive. To propel the vehicle, the Mendeleev tank was supposed to use a petrol gasoline engine from a submarine with 250 horsepower, giving the 173.2 ton vehicle a power to weight ratio of 1.44 hp/t. The vehicle was supposed to be able to reach a maximum speed of 24 km/h, though whether this would be achievable in actuality is unknown.

=== Protection ===
The Mendeleev tank featured extremely heavy armour for a vehicle of its time, with armour made from heavy steel plating that likes of which were found on warships that ranged from 150 mm thick at the front to 100 mm thick around the sides and rear. In comparison, tanks in WWI were armoured only for protection from rifle fire and machine guns having maximum armour thickness of 30 mm on the German A7V, while the far more numerous British Mark IV had armour 12 mm thick. The planned armour of the Mendeleev was thicker than most tanks found in WWII and comparable to the German Tiger II heavy tank which had 150 mm of armour at the upper glacis. The Mendeleev's exceptional protection came at the cost of weight, with the tank weighing in at 173.2 tons, making it even heavier than the German K-Wagen, a similar superheavy tank design that almost saw fruition.

== History ==
The initial design is thought to date back to as early as 1898. It was worked upon in 1911, and presented in 1916. However, the vehicle was never constructed due to the little support it received by backers or the government. Mendeleev even attempted to construct the vehicle himself, but it was never started, causing the design to remain as only a series of plans and drawings.
