= Landkreuzer P. 1000 Ratte =

- Type: Project super-heavy tank
- Place of origin: Nazi Germany

Production history
- Designer: Krupp

Specifications
- Mass: 1,000 tonnes (1,100 short tons; 980 long tons), estimated
- Length: 35 m (115 ft) hull; 39 m (128 ft) guns forwards
- Width: 14 m (46 ft)
- Height: 11 m (36 ft)
- Crew: 20+, possibly as many as 49
- Armor: 150–360 mm (5.9–14.2 in)
- Main armament: 2 × 280 mm 54.5 SK C/34
- Secondary armament: 9 × 12.8 cm Pak 44; 5 × 37 mm Flak 38; 203 × 20 mm Flak 30; 24 × 30 mm Flak 103/38; 4 × 15 mm Mauser MG 151/15; 4 × 7.92 mm MG34
- Engine: 8 × Daimler-Benz MB501 20-cylinder marine diesel engines, or; 2 × MAN V12Z32/44 24-cylinder marine diesel engines; 12,000 to 13,000 kW (16,000 to 17,000 hp)
- Power/weight: 13 kW per ton
- Suspension: Possibly a heavily reinforced torsion bar system, though official schematics regarding the suspension components were never finalized.
- Ground clearance: 2 m (79 in)
- Operational range: ~190 kilometres (120 mi)
- Maximum speed: ~40 km/h (25 mph)

The Landkreuzer P. 1000 "Ratte" (English: Land Cruiser P. 1000 "Rat") was a design for a 1000-ton tank to be used by Germany during World War II which may have been proposed by Krupp director Edward Grote in June 1942, who had already named it "Landkreuzer" ("land cruiser"). Submitted designs and drawings of the vehicle went under the names OKH Auftrag Nr. 30404 and E-30404/1, which were presented in December 1942. The tank was planned to be 1000 tonnes, far heavier than the Panzer VIII "Maus", the heaviest tank ever built (weighing 188 tonnes). The project gained the approval of Adolf Hitler, who had expressed interest in development of such a tank, but was cancelled by Minister of Armaments Albert Speer in early 1943.

== Development ==
The development history of the Ratte originated with a 1941 strategic study of Soviet heavy tanks conducted by Krupp, the study also giving birth to the Panzer VIII Maus super-heavy tank. The study led to a suggestion from Krupp's director (Grote), a special officer for submarine construction, who, on 23 June 1942, proposed to Adolf Hitler a 1,000-tonne self-propelled gun which he named "Landkreuzer" ("Land Cruiser"). It consisted of a fully tracked chassis carrying one of the surplus main gun turrets left over from the planned refitting of the Scharnhorst-class battleships. To protect this immense economic investment, the hull of the vehicle was to carry armour up to 25 centimetres (9.8 in) thick, and several anti-aircraft guns were to be installed on the vehicle's engine deck to fend off Allied ground-attack aircraft.

Hitler became enamoured with Grote's concept and ordered Krupp to begin development of it in 1942. As of December 29, 1942, a few preliminary drawings had been completed, by which time the concept had been named "Ratte". These submitted designs went under the titles OKH Auftrag Nr. 30404 and E-30404/1. Albert Speer saw no reasonable use of the tank and canceled the project in 1943 before any prototype could be manufactured, although this did lead to the concept of the Landkreuzer P. 1500 Monster self-propelled siege gun, which would have been heavier than the Ratte. The general idea for such a big tank was summed up by Heinz Guderian, saying that "Hitler's fantasies sometimes shift into the gigantic".

Not all historians are convinced that the P.1000 even got as far as an outline design. Although it is generally accepted that Hitler asked for a feasibility study of a 1000-ton tank in 1942, there is much doubt around the specifics of the plan to use the 280-millimetre (11 in) guns or spare turrets from the battleship Gneisenau. The turrets alone weighed approximately 750 tons and had a five-storey structure to house the associated handling rooms and rotating machinery. Such weapons would also require separate magazines and shell rooms as well as handling machinery for the ammunition, all of which required space and power well beyond the scope of what would be possible in a 1000-ton tracked vehicle. Accordingly, some historians believe the P.1000 Ratte diagram to be either a hoax, or alternatively a speculative engineer's sketch made for personal amusement.

== Description ==
The Ratte's proposed size was enormous: it would have weighed at least 1,000 tonnes (1,100 short tons), more than five times the weight of the Panzer VIII Maus, the largest tank ever constructed by Nazi Germany. The weight of the Ratte was made up of 300 tonnes of armament (the total weight of the guns themselves was 100 tonnes, so turret armour would have weighed 200 tonnes), 200 tonnes of armour and frame, and 100 tonnes of track and automotive components, with other features making up the remainder. It was planned to be 35 m (115 ft) long (39 metres (128 ft) when including naval guns), 11 m (36 ft) high, and 14 m (46 ft) wide. This immense weight was to be distributed across the ground by six 1.2-metre (3 ft 11 in) wide and 21-metre (69 ft) long treads, together forming two composite treads with a width of 3.6 metres (11 ft 10 in) each. This would help stability and weight distribution, but the vehicle's sheer mass would have destroyed roads and rendered bridge crossings next to impossible. It was expected that its height, and its ground clearance of 2 m (6.6 ft), would have allowed it to ford most rivers with relative ease, thus eliminating the need for bridge crossings.

Planned propulsion was by two MAN V12Z32/44 24-cylinder marine diesel engines of 6,300 kW (8,400 hp) each or eight Daimler-Benz MB 501 20-cylinder marine diesel engines of 1,500 kW (2,000 hp) each (as used in E-boats) to achieve the 12,000 kW (16,000 hp) needed to move the tank. The engines were to be provided with snorkels, also like those used by German submarines. The snorkels were designed to provide a way for oxygen to reach the engine, even during amphibious operations while passing through deep water.

The Ratte′s primary weapon would have been a dual 28 cm SK C/34 naval gun turret. This was a turret derived from one on the damaged German battleship Gneisenau but with the centre gun and its associated loading mechanism removed. This allowed extra accommodation of ammunition and reduced the total weight of the tank by 50 tonnes. The guns used for the Ratte would have fired ammunition developed for other naval guns. It also included armour-piercing rounds with 8.1 kg (18 lb) of explosive filler, and high-explosive rounds with 17.1 kg (38 lb) of explosive filler.

Illustration of the proposed Landkreuzer P. 1000 Ratte (left) in comparison to other German tanks — the proposed Panzer VIII Maus (center) and the Tiger I (right). A human figure is at far left.

Further armament was to consist of a 128 mm anti-tank gun of the type used in the Jagdtiger or Maus, two 15 mm Mauser MG 151/15 autocannons, and eight 20 mm Flak 38 anti-aircraft guns, probably with at least four of them as a Flakvierling quadruple mounts. The 128 mm anti-tank gun's precise location on the Ratte is a point of contention among historians, most believing that it would have been mounted within the primary turret, with some others thinking a smaller secondary turret at the rear of the Ratte more logical. Some concept drawings exist to suggest a flexible mount on the glacis plate. The tank was to be provided with a vehicle bay that could hold two BMW R12 motorcycles for scouting, and several smaller storage rooms, a compact infirmary area, and a self-contained lavatory system.

== Issues ==
The large size and weight would have rendered the tank unable to cross bridges at the risk of collapsing them, and travelling on roads would quickly destroy them. Though its top intended speed was 40 kilometres per hour (25 mph), its huge size and high visibility would have made it extremely vulnerable to aerial bombardment and artillery fire. Its great size would also have meant that once built the vehicle's strategic, operational, and tactical mobility would be entirely dependent on its own drivetrain, for there were no other realistic means of moving it from one firing position to another. No existing railway or train car could bear its weight and its width was too great for existing tunnels.

== See also ==
- Schwerer Gustav
- Landkreuzer P. 1500 Monster
- Land battleship
- T-42
