= TOG2 =

British WWII super-heavy tank prototype

Coordinates: 50.69553°N 2.24371°W

Heavy Tank, TOG II
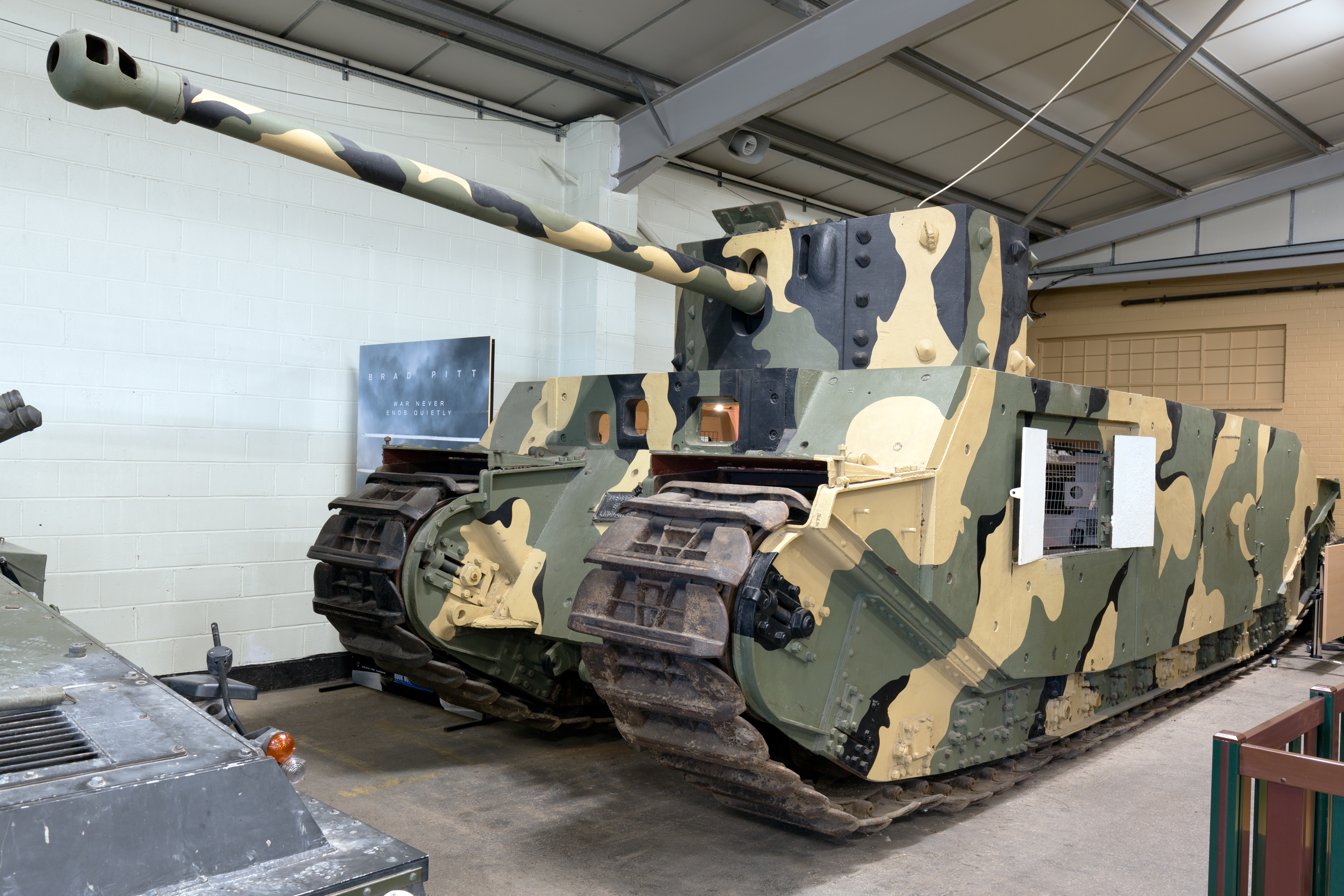
- TOG II* at The Tank Museum, Bovington
- Type: Super-heavy tank
- Place of origin: United Kingdom

Production history
- Designed: 1940
- Manufacturer: William Foster & Co.
- Produced: 1941
- No. built: 1 prototype

Specifications (TOG 2*)
- Mass: 80 long tons (81.3 metric tons)
- Length: 10.13 m (33 ft 3 in)
- Width: 3.12 m (10 ft 3 in)
- Height: 3.05 m (10 ft 0 in)
- Crew: 6 (Commander, gunner, 2 loaders, driver, co-driver)
- Armour: 114 mm at the front of the turret and hull 76 mm at the sides of the hull, 50 mm at the rear of the tank cemented armour on 12.7 mm (0.5 inch) mild steel
- Main armament: 28-pounder 3.7 in (94 mm) gun
- Secondary armament: 7.92 mm Besa machine gun
- Engine: Paxman-Ricardo 12-cylinder diesel-electric 600 hp (450 kW)
- Power/weight: 7.5 hp/t
- Transmission: 2 electric motors
- Suspension: unsprung torsion bar (TOG II*)
- Operational range: 50 mi (80 km)
- Maximum speed: 8.5 mph (13.7 km/h) (achieved); 15 mph (24 km/h) (theoretical)

The TOG 2, officially known as the Heavy Tank, TOG II, was a British super-heavy tank design produced during the early stages of World War II for a scenario where the battlefields of northern France and Belgium devolved into a morass of mud, trenches, and craters as had happened during World War I. When this did not happen, the tank was deemed unnecessary, and the project terminated. A development of the TOG 1 design, only a single prototype was built before its termination.

== History ==
The second design to come out of the Special Vehicle Development Committee (nicknamed "The Old Gang" as it was made up of people who had worked on the original British tanks of the First World War), the TOG 2 was similar to the TOG 1 and kept many of its features. Instead of the track path arrangement of the TOG 1 which – like that of the First World War British tanks – ran up over the top of the hull and back down, the track path was lower on the return run, and the doors were above the tracks. Ordered in 1940, built by Fosters of Lincoln, the prototype ran for the first time in March 1941. In April 1941, an enquiry was made by the Deputy Director-General of Tanks and Transport to the English Electric Company to see if 100 could be produced. In June 1941, the Minister of Supply enquired about the production of 50 tanks. Neither of these inquiries lead to production orders.

The design included a 6-pounder gun and side sponsons. For "initial trials" it was fitted with a mockup turret with dummy guns — a 2-pdr gun, 3-inch howitzer, and a Besa machine gun — together with a 3-inch howitzer in the hull. The second turret fitted was simplified mounting a QF 3-inch 16 cwt anti-tank gun derived from the current anti-aircraft gun. The planned sponsons were never fitted. The tank is currently fitted with a 28 pounder gun derived from the QF 3.7-inch AA gun but with a Ordnance QF 17-pounder breech and muzzle brake.

Although equipped with the same electrical drive as originally fitted to the TOG 1, the TOG 2 used twin generators and no problems were reported. It was modified to include, among other things, a change from the unsprung tracks to a torsion bar suspension, and went through successful trials in May 1943. No further development occurred, although a revised version, the TOG 2 (R) was proposed. The 'R' would have been 6 ft (1.8 m) shorter, used torsion bar suspension, and had no sponsons.

The single TOG 2 prototype in the TOG II* configuration can be seen at The Tank Museum, where it has been since the 1950s. It was moved indoors towards the end of the 1980s and to its current position in the 2000s.

== See also ==
- Neubaufahrzeug
- M6 heavy tank

== Bibliography ==
- Andrew Hills, The Tanks of TOG: The work, designs, and tanks of the Special Vehicle Development Committee in World War II, 2017, CreateSpace Publishing, ISBN 978-1-9746-8037-5
- Chamberlain, P; Ellis, C; British and American Tanks of World War II, 1969, Arco Publishing
- White BT, British Tanks 1915-1945, 1963, Ian Allan, ASIN B002MQ8I1S
- Tank Heavy, TOG II* (E1951.49), Tank Museum, Bovington, archived from the original on 17 April 2018
