= K-Wagen =

German WWI super-heavy tank prototype

K Panzerkampfwagen
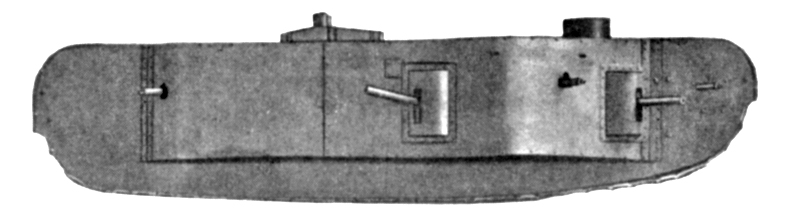
- The "K" Panzerkampfwagen (front of the vehicle is at right)
- Type: Super-heavy tank
- Place of origin: German Empire

Service history
- In service: Never used

Specifications
- Mass: 120 t
- Length: 13 metres (42 ft 8 in)
- Width: 6 metres (19 ft 8 in)
- Height: 3 metres (9 ft 10 in)
- Crew: 27
- Armor: 30 mm
- Main armament: 4 x 77 mm guns
- Secondary armament: 7 x 7.92 mm MG08
- Engine: 2 x V6 Daimler; 650 hp (480 kW)
- Suspension: unsprung
- Maximum speed: 7.5 kilometres per hour (4.7 mph)

The Großkampfwagen or "K-Wagen" (short for G.K.-Wagen) was a German super-heavy tank, two prototypes of which were almost completed by the end of World War I.

== History ==
In June 1917, before the first A7V tanks had been completed, the German War Ministry ordered the development of a new superheavy tank intended to be used in break-through situations. Design work was carried out by Joseph Vollmer, a reserve captain and engineer working for the Verkehrstechnische Prüfungskommission ("Transport-technologies Board of Examiners" of the army), and a Captain Weger.

On June 28, 1917 the War Ministry approved the draft design and ordered ten examples, five to be built by the Riebe ball-bearing factory in Berlin and five by Wegmann & Co. of Kassel.

The vehicle originally weighed 165 tons but this was reduced to a more practicable 120 tons by shortening the length. The huge size and mass of the K-Wagen made it impossible to transport complete, so it was decided that it would be split into four sections for transport by rail, to be reassembled behind the front line near where it was to be used.

Two prototypes were built at the request of Hindenburg, but were still incomplete by the end of the war due to lack of raw materials and other demands for weaponry.

== Description ==
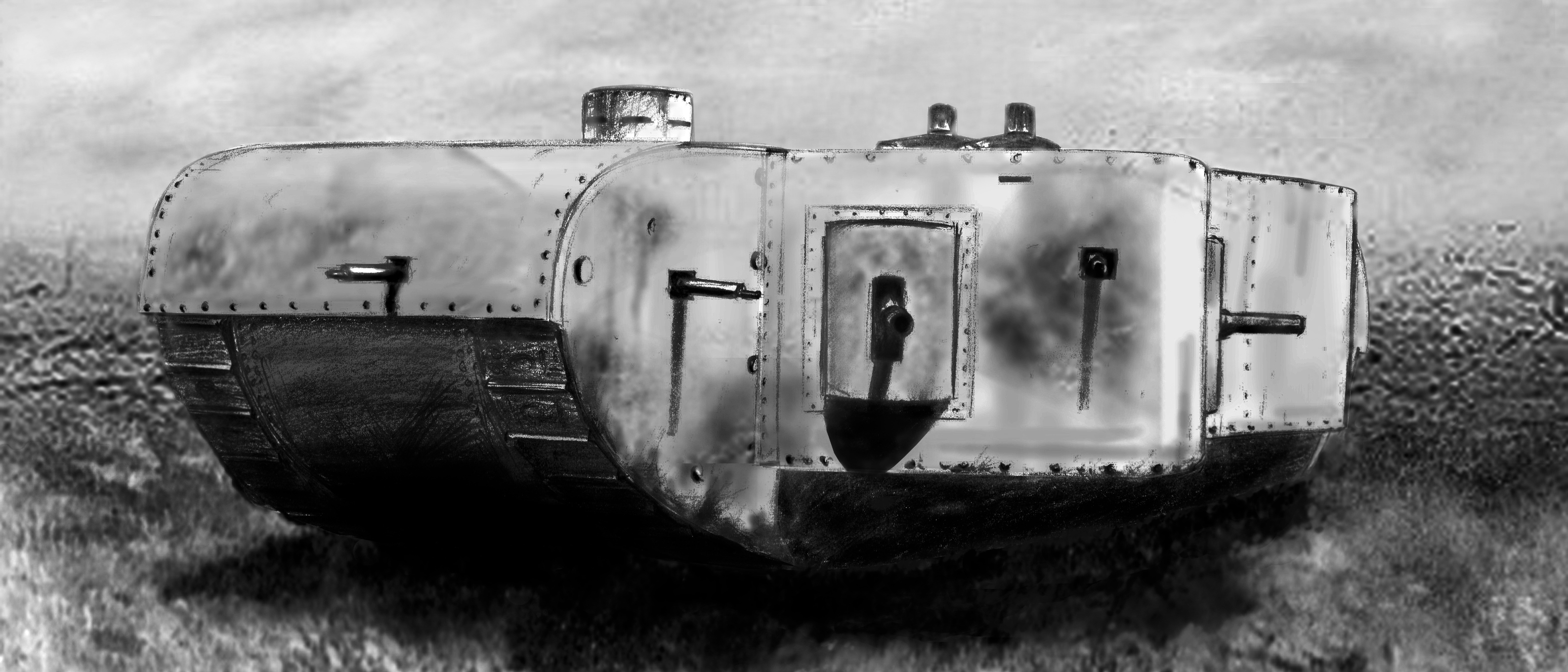
Drawing of a K-Wagen

The hull of the K-Wagen consisted of six modules that could be transported separately by rail: the control room, the fighting room, the engine room, the transmission room and the two sponsons. The commander could give orders to the crew by means of electric lights: fire control was comparable to that of a destroyer, the Germans seeing the vehicle as a veritable "landship". The drivers would have had to steer the vehicle blindly, directed by the commander.

The K-Wagen was to be armed with four 77 mm fortress guns and seven MG08 machine guns and had a crew of 27: a commander, two drivers, a signaler, an artillery officer, 12 artillery men, eight machine gunners and two mechanics. At the beginning of the project the incorporation of flamethrowers was considered but later rejected.

The K-Wagen never became operational as under the conditions of the Armistice Germany was forbidden to possess tanks. One of the tanks, "Ribe" was complete at the end of the war, but it never left the factory and was scrapped under the watchful eyes of the Military Inter-Allied Commission of Control.

== See also ==
- Flying Elephant - British unbuilt design of similar size
- Mark VIII another tank of similar size and design
