= Panzer IX and Panzer X =

Fabricated tank designs of Nazi Germany

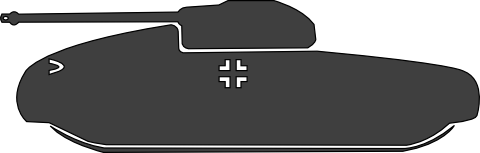
Pz Kpfw IX side view, based on the Signal magazine drawing

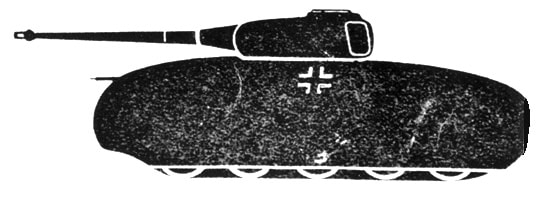
Pz Kpfw X side view

The super-heavy tanks Panzerkampfwagen IX and Panzerkampfwagen X were silhouette conceptual drawings in an edition of the German World War II Signal military magazine. The drawings were not based on any actual designs, and were solely printed to deceive Allied intelligence.
