= T-42 super-heavy tank =

Soviet super-heavy tank project

T-42
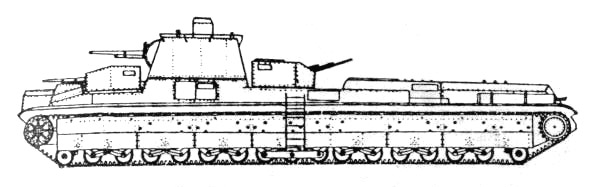
- left profile draft of T-42 tank
- Type: Super-heavy tank
- Place of origin: Soviet Union

Service history
- In service: Not put into service

Production history
- Designer: Edward Grote
- Designed: 1930–1932
- No. built: 0

Specifications (T-44A)
- Mass: 101.6 tonnes (112 short tons; 100 long tons)
- Length: N/A
- Width: N/A
- Height: N/A
- Crew: 14-15
- Armour: 90 mm (3.5 in) front armour
- Main armament: 107 mm M1910/30 field gun
- Secondary armament: 2 x 45 mm M1932/38 (20K) tank guns 4-5 x 7.62 mm DTM machine gun
- Engine: 2x Diesel; 2,000 hp (1,500 kW) total
- Power/weight: 19.7 hp/t (20.0 hp/LT; 17.9 hp/ST)
- Maximum speed: 20–27 km/h (12–17 mph) on road

The T-42 (also known as the TG-V) was a Soviet super-heavy tank project of the interwar period. It was developed in 1932 by the OKB-5 design bureau at Bolshevik Plant no. 232 under the direction of a German engineer-designer Edward Grote. Development did not advance past the stage of construction drawings and scale models. The design was passed over in favour of the T-35 project which was already at the prototype stage.

== History ==
From the late 1920s to early 1930s, the military-political situation in the Soviet Union demanded emergency measures for the modernization of the army. The implementation of the 1929 program by the Council of People's Commissars (Sovnarkom) was designed to equip the armed forces with improved tanks. Most Red Army armor at the time consisted of relatively modern light infantry support tanks like the T-18 (MS-1), and the role of medium and heavy tanks was fulfilled mainly by British tanks that were captured in the Russian Civil War. Work began to create indigenous medium and heavy tanks, but it quickly became apparent that the USSR lacked the necessary scientific base and experience for tank design. After several unsuccessful attempts to develop an all-domestic tank design (such as the T-30), it was decided that the Army would attract professionals from abroad, primarily from Germany.

In March 1930 a group of experts from Germany - headed by engineer Edward Grote - arrived by invitation in the USSR. The group was commissioned to draft future tanks to arm the Red Army. Grote's first job was "a powerful medium tank", designated "TG", which had an overall level of engineering ahead of its time. The tank made a very favorable impression on the leadership of the Red Army, but the high complexity of its design caused it to remain a purely experimental development.

However, this did not discourage Grote, and the OKB started designing a heavy tank. Being a talented engineer, Grote had impressive experience in designing tanks and at the beginning of the 1930s the Soviet Union was one of the few countries that was able to finance the design and construction of these machines. By March 1932 the German engineer presented the military draft of a heavy breakthrough tank weighing 75 tons, conventionally called the TG-VI. This development did not receive special support from UMM RKKA, resulting in Grote reworking it into a new project tank called the T-42 (or TG-V). It was even more impressive than its predecessor and weighed 100 tonnes. In the summer of 1932 the new project was considered by the military and, like its predecessor, met with little success.

By this time the UMM RKKA already had a choice of the T-35 as a heavy tank, which was superior to Grote's design. The engine the T-42 needed did not actually exist, and the problem of powering the massive vehicle was not solved. The speed and maneuverability of the tank were questioned and high price noted. As a result, the UMM RKKA Commission decided that the T-42 was not fully consistent with the presented design goals and decided to end work on the project, focusing instead on the T-35.

== Design ==
The layout of the T-42 was similar to the T-35 (a prototype of which (the T-35-1) was based on the work of the Kharkiv Locomotive Factory) with five turrets: one turret with a 107 mm M1910/30 field gun, two BT-2 tank turrets with 45 mm M1932/38 (20K)s, and two turrets with 7.62 mm DTM machine guns. Like its predecessor, the TG-IV, the T-42 had two tiers, with the main gun on the upper tier and the secondary weapons on the lower tier.

The control compartment was at the front. To ensure an acceptable view from the driver's seat, the driver's compartment was placed along the axis of the tank, and its position was pushed forward and equipped with an armored superstructure. A variety of weapons were housed in five towers arranged in two tiers. The first layer was formed by four towers placed around the main turret. Installed in front of the two cannon towers were turrets armed with 45 mm M1932/38 (20K) tank gun, and paired with 7.62-mm machine-guns. Finally, there was a rear turret equipped with twin DT machine guns to perform anti-air duties. The second tier contained the main turret, which was adapted for the installation of the M1910/30. On the roof of the main tower there was also a small cupola for the commander. Detailed design of the tank weapons was not in the scope of the project, and the documentation only showed how the weapons would be laid out.

There was also a design in which the placement of weapons was in three towers, of which there would be a turret with a 76.2 mm gun (traverse 202 °) at the front, a turret with the regular 45 mm gun (angle GN 278 °) at the back, and the main 107 mm gun (GN 270 ° angle ) in the centre.

The power compartment was housed in the rear of the hull. Even with a large engine installed, it is likely there would not have been enough power to move the 100-ton machine easily. To ensure the tank met the speed required by the Red Army UMM, the T-42 needed about 2,000 horsepower. Since in 1932 there was no such single engine capable of producing 2,000 hp, installation of two diesel engines, each producing 1000 hp, would have been necessary.

The tank suspension was composed of 17 twin small diameter rollers, an idler at the front, and rear driving sprocket. The 1st and 17th road wheels had individual suspension, the three middle rollers connected to the common carriage, and the remaining pairs were in 6 bogies. To facilitate the management of the tank, as in the case of TG, Grote decided to apply an electric transmission and servo control that, although increasing the ergonomics of the tank, further complicated the suspension and raised its cost.

It was assumed that the tank would have different armor levels on each facing, with a maximum thickness of the frontal parts of the hull and turrets of 90 mm.

== Analysis ==
Like most super-heavy tanks developed in the 1920s-1930s around the world, the T-42 had almost no practical utility. The sheer size and weight of such a tank made it a vulnerable target, even with its anti-air defenses, and the maneuverability of the tank was also in doubt. In addition, there was the problem of delivering tanks of this size and weight to the front line and into combat (for example, moving such a heavy machine over bridges or creating a rail car that could carry it). For these reasons and the prohibitive cost, the T-42, despite its powerful weapons, compared unfavorably to the T-35, which was eventually selected by the USSR for adoption.
