= Super-heavy tank =

Extremely large or weighty tracked fighting vehicle

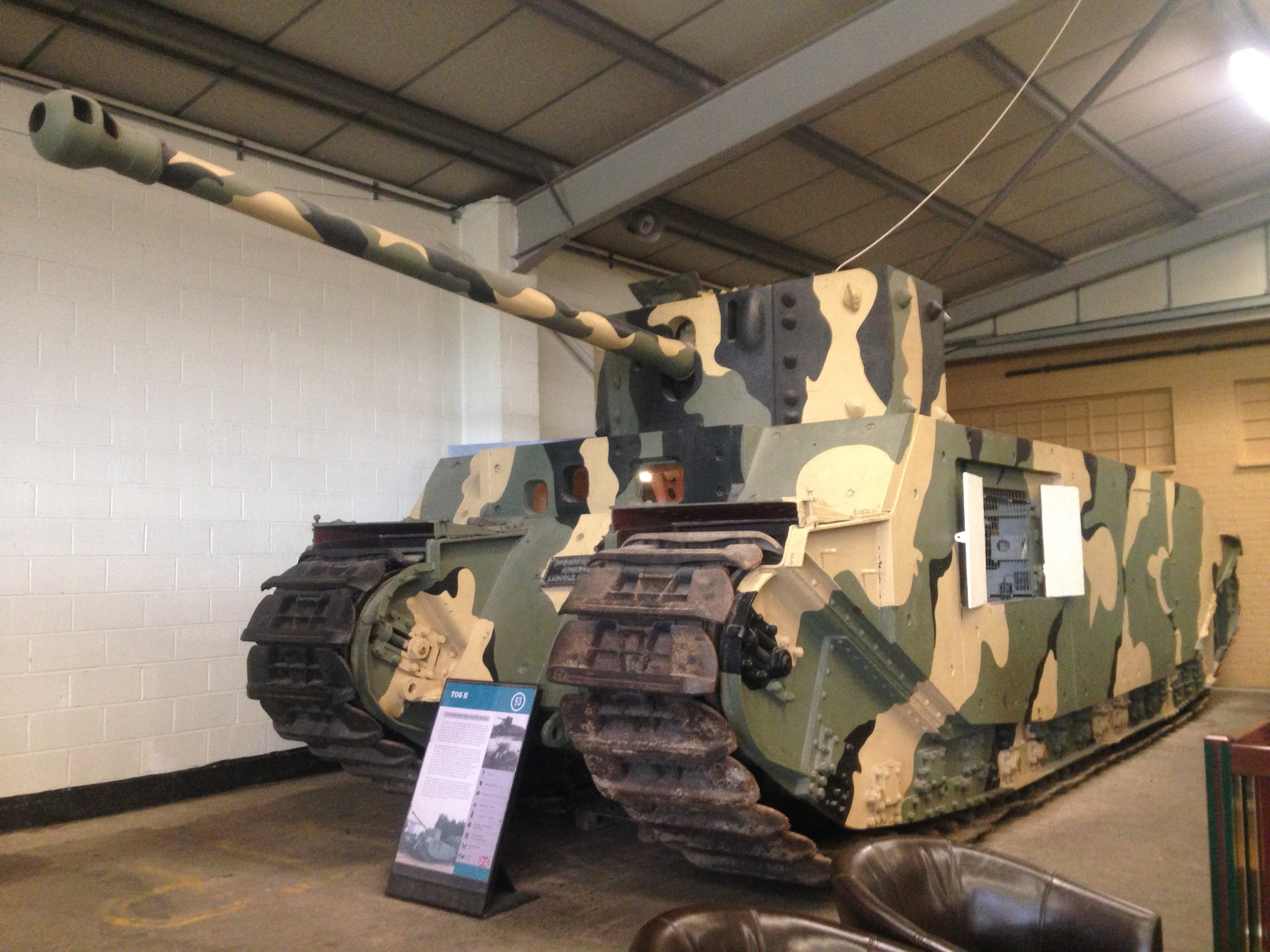
British TOG II (80 tons) at The Tank Museum, Bovington

A super-heavy tank is any tank that is notably beyond the standard of the class heavy tank in either size or weight relative to contemporary vehicles.

Programs have been initiated on several occasions with the aim of creating an extremely resilient vehicle for penetrating enemy formations without fear of being destroyed in combat; however, only a few examples were built, and there is little evidence of any super-heavy tank having seen combat. Examples were designed in the First and Second World Wars, along with a few during the Cold War.

== History ==
=== First World War ===
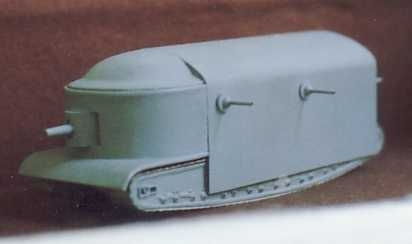
Model of the Flying Elephant design, projected to weigh 100 tons

The first super-heavy tank was designed by the Russian naval engineer Vasily Mendeleyev who worked on the project from 1911 to 1915. The tank was envisioned to be invulnerable to almost all contemporary threats but remained on paper due to its high construction cost. Following the production of their first tanks, the British "Flying Elephant" was designed as a tank that would be resistant to artillery fire. Since mobility was more important than protection, and the tanks already developed were successful, work on the project was stopped. The German K-Wagen (Großkampfwagen) was a very heavy design carrying 4 guns and needing a crew of 27. Two of them were under construction when the war ended, and both were demolished.

In the early 1920s, the French produced the 70-tonne Char 2C. The ten tanks would see limited combat during the Battle for France in 1940, but were used mostly for propaganda purposes and the French tried to pull them out of combat zones.

The pre-Second World War design and prototype of TOG2 was heavier than any other contemporary tank used by United Kingdom and can also be considered a super-heavy tank.

=== Second World War ===
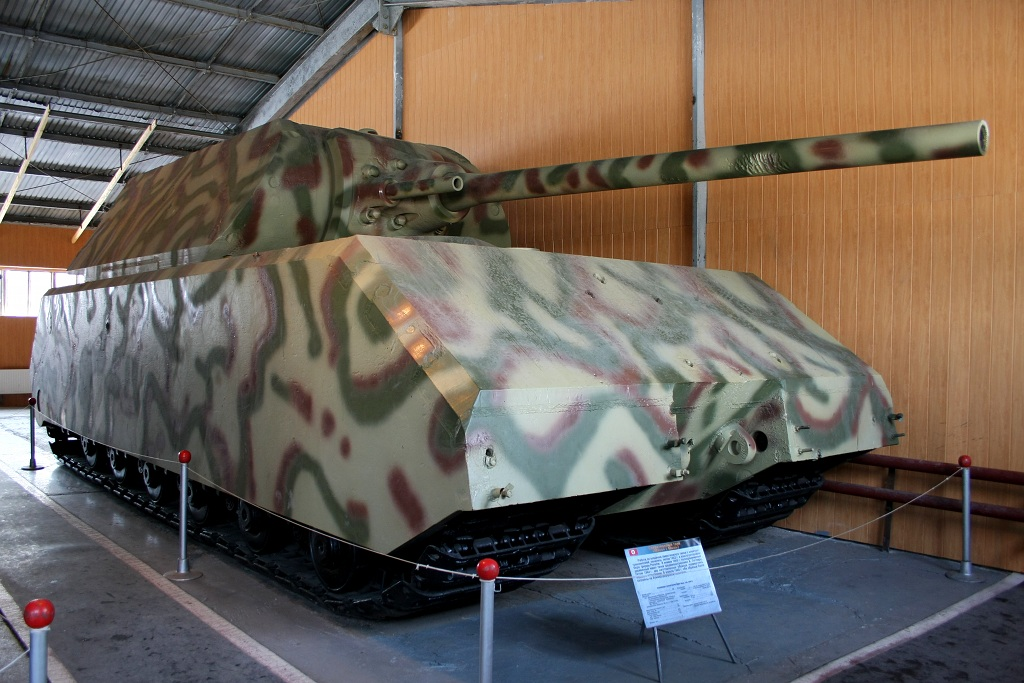
German super-heavy tank Panzer VIII Maus (188 tons) at the Kubinka Tank Museum.

During the Second World War, all of the major combatants introduced prototypes for special roles. Adolf Hitler was a proponent of "war winning" weapons and supported projects like the 188 tonne Maus, and even larger 1,000 tonne Landkreuzer P. 1000 Ratte. The British and Soviets all built prototype designs similar to the Jagdtiger, and the US was working on the project then known as T95 Gun Carriage, which was later changed to T28 super-heavy tank. However, not all of these designs were constructed, and most never passed the prototype stage.

Compared to other heavy tanks of the time, the Tiger II can be considered a super-heavy tank, considering that nearly all contemporary heavy tanks in service at the time were significantly lighter. However, during this period of the war Germany generally opted to field and design heavier vehicles. By late 1943, the Panzer IV tank had been significantly up-armed and up-armoured in contrast to its original role and production specifications (resulting in a considerably heavier tank), and Panthers were considered medium tanks despite being of similar mass and volume to contemporary heavy tanks of other nations involved in the conflict. As a result of the trend of generally increasing mass, by late-war German standards the Tiger II is a heavy tank. It is widely classified as a heavy tank by war historians, and nowhere near as heavy as the undisputedly super-heavy Maus.

=== Cold War ===
The idea of very heavy tanks saw less development after the Second World War, not least since the destructive force of tactical nuclear weapons would always overcome any feasible armour. Wartime advances in armour and propulsion technology allowed post-war heavy tanks developed by multiple nations to be significantly heavier than the average heavy tank fielded in World War II, while not reducing overall comparative mobility. Examples include Object 279 (Soviet Union), T30 Heavy Tank (United States) and Conqueror (Britain). All of these vehicles meet or exceed a weight 60 tonnes while still being capable of reaching speeds of 35 kph or faster. While the American T30 tank exceeded 85 tonnes while combat loaded, none of these vehicles can be considered a super-heavy tank.

Main battle tanks were developed and used by every tank building nation during the Cold War, largely phasing out the doctrinal role and use of "medium", "heavy", "cruiser" and "infantry" tanks. For example, the last heavy tank in American service was the 65-tn M103, which was retired from US Army service in 1963 (and from US Marine service in 1973). Fielding a tank larger than an MBT during this period would not provide a significant advantage to protection or offensive capability, considering the likely battlefield conditions and theaters of war. No super-heavy MBTs were produced during the Cold War.

=== Post–Cold War ===
Further advances in armour technology have given the armour of late 20th century tanks the estimated equivalent of over a metre of rolled homogeneous armour (the primary type of armour used before the invention of composite armour, now used as a standard for comparison between different armour designs). This means adding more armour would not increase protection to any significant degree. Current development is instead focused on a combination of remaining undetected, interfering with tracking, and active countermeasures to neutralize the enemy weapon systems.

== List of models ==
United Kingdom

- TOG 1: 80 tons; built in 1940; designed for ground conditions similar to those experienced in the First World War; one prototype.
- TOG II*: 80 tons improved design of TOG1; one prototype.
- Flying Elephant: First World War-era project at 100 tons; not built.
- Tortoise heavy assault tank: 80 tons, designed to attack fortifications. 6 pilot vehicles were completed.

Neither of the TOG prototypes were built the way they were designed; had the sponsons been added and the proper turret attached, their weight would have been different.

France

- Char 2C: 69 tonnes; ten built, in service from 1921 to 1940; obsolete by the Second World War, nine destroyed to prevent capture and the remaining one was shown in Berlin as a trophy.
  - Char 2C bis: 72 tonnes; modified Char 2C with 155 mm howitzer and different turret; one Char 2C was converted into this variant but later returned to the original configuration.
  - Char 2C Surblindé: 75 tonnes; an up-armoured Char 2C, with additional armour increasing the frontal protection to 90 mm and side protection to 65 mm.
- FCM F1: 139 tonnes; First World War-era replacement for the Char 2C, meant to attack fortifications. Ordered to be built, and full-scale wooden mock-up was produced, but no prototypes were made before the Fall of France (1940).
- ARL Tracteur C: 145 tonnes, developed by ARL to attack fortifications; wooden mockup was produced but canceled in favor of FCM F1 which was proven to be a superior design (developed 1939-1940)
- AMX Tracteur C: 140 tonnes, developed by AMX to attack fortifications; the project was terminated after AMX was out of schedule (developed 1939-1940)

German Empire

- K-Wagen: 120 tonnes; two were nearly complete when the First World War ended. Both were demolished.

Nazi Germany

- Panzer IX: Fake concept drawing printed by Signal to deceive Allied intelligence.
- Panzer X: Another fake concept by Signal.
- Panzerkampfwagen E 75 Standardpanzer: 92 tons; only a design concept.
- Panzerkampfwagen E-100: 140 tonnes; one incomplete hull at factory captured by British and later scrapped.
- Panzer VII Löwe: About 95–100 tonnes; cancelled in favour of Maus.
- Panzer VIII Maus: 188 tonnes, two prototypes. Both were captured by the Soviet army, although one had been partially destroyed. A composite of the two can now be seen at the Kubinka Tank Museum.
- Landkreuzer P. 1000 Ratte: 1,000 tonnes; cancelled, no evidence construction began.

Japanese Empire

- O-I series
  - "Super-heavy tank": 120+ tonnes. Purportedly one prototype was produced in 1943. According to another source, the O-I project was canceled before the 120-tonne prototype was completed.

Russian Empire

- Tsar tank: A 59-tonne tricycle gun platform made in 1914, with giant metal wheels approximately 9 meters in diameter. It was abandoned because it was vulnerable to artillery.
- Mendeleev tank: 1911 to 1915 design for a heavily armoured "landship" which would have weighed around 170 tonnes if built.

Soviet Union

- T-42 (Tank Grote or TG-V): 100 tonnes with 107mm main gun and four sub-turrets. Models and drawings were produced, but no prototypes were made.
- KV-4: 1941 project. A set of design requirements produced multiple proposals for a tank carrying a 107 mm main gun and a 45 mm or 76 mm secondary. Various layouts were considered, weighing as light as 82.5 tonnes and as heavy as 107 tonnes. Feasibility stage only, no prototypes were built.
- KV-5: another Kliment Voroshilov series 100-tonne-class tank design. Armed with the same 107 mm main gun in a large, KV-2-style turret and two 12.7 mm machine gun turrets (one on the forward hull, one on top of the main turret); powered by two V2 diesels due to wartime lack of a 1,200 hp (890 kW) engine. The project stopped due to the Siege of Leningrad and was cancelled without anything built.

United States

- T28 super-heavy tank: Also known as T95 GMC, designed for attacking heavy fortifications. 86.2 tonnes; 2 prototypes built right after the Second World War; by layout a self-propelled gun very similar to British Tortoise. One is on display at Fort Benning (formerly Fort Moore), Georgia.

== Bibliography ==
- Estes, Kenneth (2014). Super-heavy Tanks of World War II. Osprey. ISBN 978-1782003830.
- Zaloga, Steven J.; Grandsen, James (1984). Soviet Tanks and Combat Vehicles of World War Two. London: Arms and Armour Press. ISBN 0-85368-606-8.
