= Landkreuzer P. 1500 Monster =

Proposed super heavy self-propelled gun

Landkreuzer P 1500 Monster
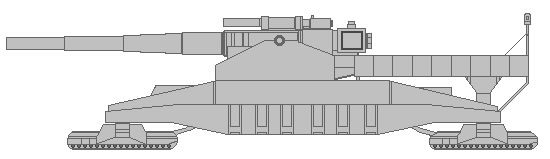
- Artist's rendition of the P.1500 Monster
- Type: Proposed super heavy self-propelled gun
- Place of origin: Nazi Germany

Specifications
- Mass: 1,794 t (1,978 short tons; 1,766 long tons) (800 mm gun variant) 801 t (883 short tons; 788 long tons) (600 mm gun variant)
- Length: 25 metres (82 ft) (800 mm gun variant)
- Width: 12.8 metres (42 ft) (800 mm gun variant)
- Height: 8.25 metres (27.1 ft) (800 mm gun variant)
- Crew: 100+
- Armor: 250 millimetres (9.8 in) (hull front) 200 millimetres (7.9 in) (hull sides) (800mm gun variant)
- Main armament: 1 × 800 mm gun OR 1 x 600mm mortar
- Engine: 4 × Daimler-Benz MB.501; 6,000 kW (8,000 hp)
- Operational range: Unknown
- Maximum speed: 7 km/h (4.3 mph)

The Landkreuzer P 1500 Monster was a purported German pre-prototype super-heavy self-propelled gun designed during World War II. While it is mentioned in a number of popular works about World War II projects, there is no solid documentation for the program’s existence, and it may have only been a semi-serious proposal, or even an outright hoax, much like the Panzer IX and Panzer X.

== See also ==
- Crawler-transporter, the largest self-propelled land vehicles ever built
- Bagger 293, a bucket-wheel excavator and the largest land vehicle ever built by weight
- The Captain, Big Muskie and Bagger 288, previous land vehicle record holders for weight
- Overburden Conveyor Bridge F60, the largest land vehicle ever built by physical dimensions
