= Tanks of the interwar period =

List of tanks in the Interwar Period

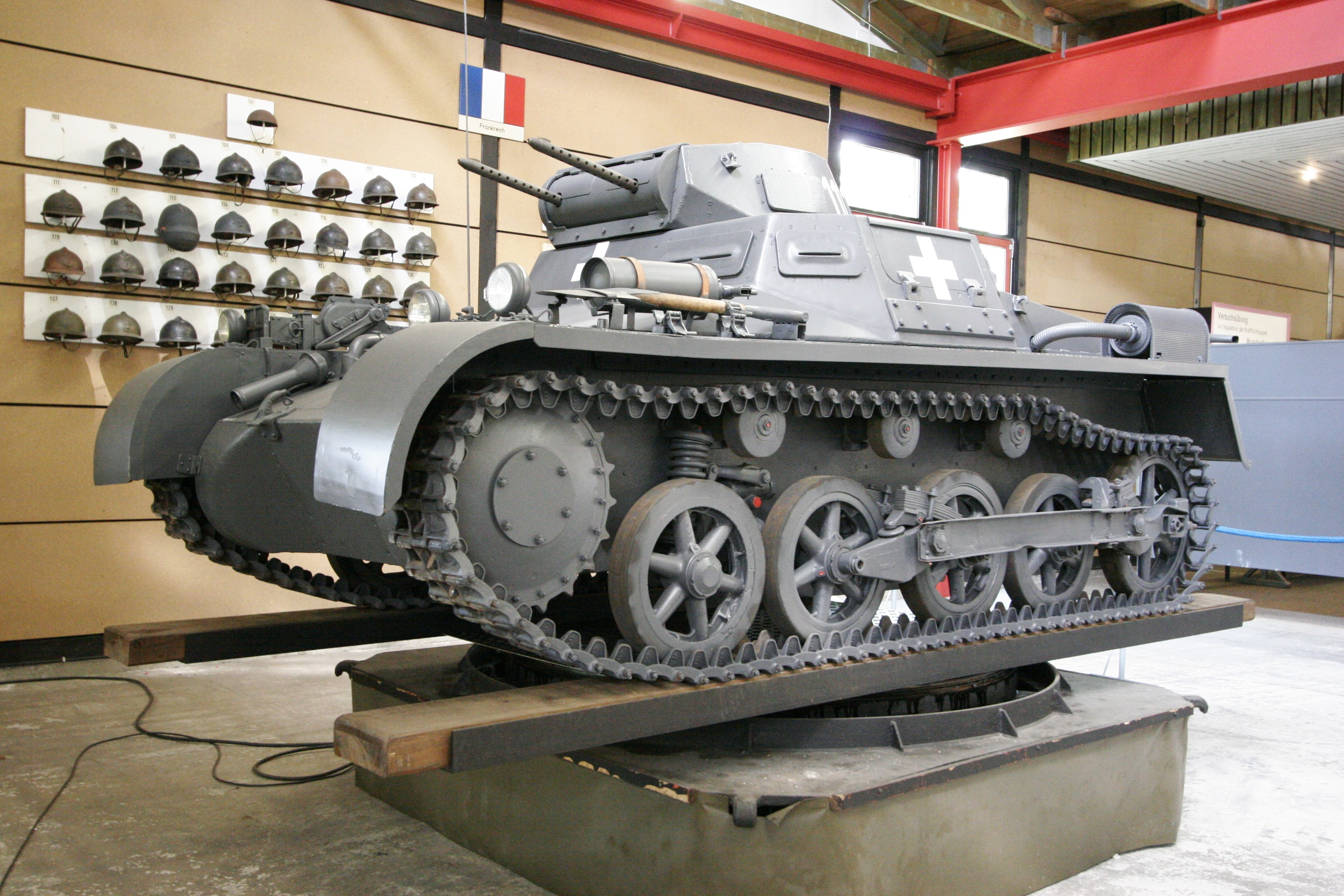
A Panzerkampfwagen I Ausf. A on display at the Deutsches Panzermuseum Munster, Germany.

Tanks were initially deployed in World War I, engineered to overcome the deadlock of trench warfare. Between the two world wars, tanks were further developed. Although they had demonstrated their battlefield effectiveness, only a few nations had the industrial resources to design and build them. During and after World War I, Britain and France pioneered tank technology, with their models generally serving as a blueprint for other countries. However, this initial advantage would slowly diminish during the 1930s, shifting in favor of the Soviet Union and, to a lesser degree, Nazi Germany.

== General developments ==
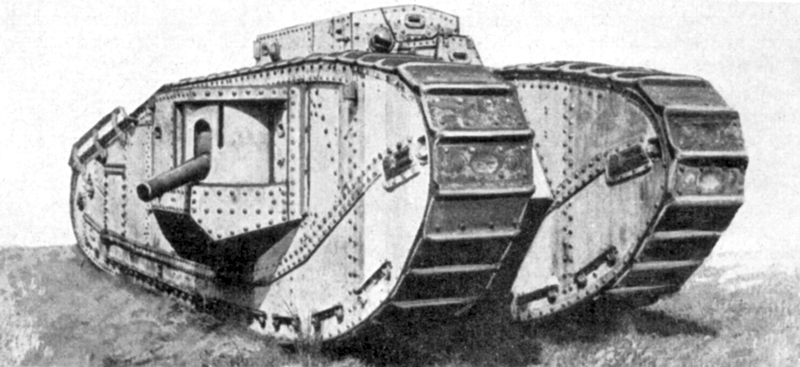
Mark VIII "Liberty" Tank

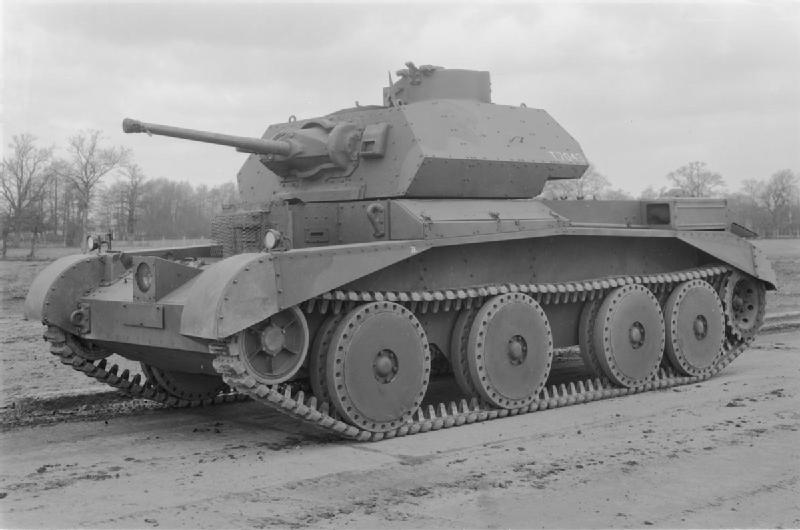
The British A13 Cruiser Mk IV tank

The final tank designs of 1918 were influenced by a number of developments and demonstrated several trends in tank design. One such example was the joint US and British Mark VIII tank, which was envisioned as a heavy tank design that could be utilized by both nations as well as the French. The purpose of this tank was to address the limitations of earlier British heavy tanks.

The Mark VIII measured 34 feet (10 meters) in length and weighed 37 tons. It was powered by a 300-horsepower (224-kilowatt) V-12 engine and could reach a top speed of 7 miles per hour (11 kilometers per hour) across difficult terrain. Only 100 of these tanks were built. It was the lighter Renault FT that would set the standard for nearly all tanks that followed it. This tank featured a lower track profile and a more compact hull, as well as a turret-mounted weapon system.

Worldwide, several types of tanks were considered, and much of the development effort went into light tanks that were useful primarily against infantry or for colonial police-type work. The worldwide economic difficulties of the 1920s and 1930s led to an increased emphasis on light tanks as they were much cheaper to produce than medium or heavy tanks. However, the Spanish Civil War showed that tank-versus-tank engagements and tank-versus-towed anti-tank gun engagements would now be a major consideration for the future of tank warfare. It became clear that tanks would need to be heavily armoured and carry larger guns. Tank shape, previously guided purely by considerations of obstacle clearance, now became a trade-off between a low profile, desirable for stealth, and weight savings.

In the UK, a great deal of study on the future of tank warfare was carried out, and there were some differences. Whilst both J.F.C. Fuller and Basil Liddell Hart foresaw a war where all arms, infantry, tanks, and artillery, would be mechanised, Fuller's theories looked at all-arms formations with artillery, infantry, and military engineers mounted on similar vehicles to keep pace with the tanks. He foresaw armies using heavy all-arms formations to break through opponents defences, allowing lighter, faster units to make rapid advances, thereby not allowing the enemy to re-establish any defences.

Liddell Hart considered that armoured vehicles would carry their own supporting infantry, in much the same way as modern warships carry their own marine detachments; he also proposed using indirect attack, effectively going around any defences. During the late 1920s the British Army established the Experimental Mechanized Force, to test these theories and look at the basic problems of managing, controlling and commanding all arms formations, including the use of aircraft.

Many of the units involved in this force were posted to North Africa, where their experience played a major part in the British success in the East African Campaign and General Wavell's initial successes in the Western Desert campaign. The British used three classes of tank: the 'Infantry tank', for supporting the infantry; the 'Cruiser tank', for fast moving encounter battles and reconnaissance; and the 'light tank', for reconnaissance, escort and internal security.

In the U.S., J. Walter Christie developed a series of fast tanks, based on his revolutionary Christie suspension system. This was combined with very high power-to-weight ratios achieved by fitting large aircraft engines in his tanks. Although his prototypes were capable of very high speeds, and in some cases designed to be air transportable, disputes with the United States Army Ordnance Corps and a high price (compared with what the US military was willing to pay) meant they were never produced in the USA.

Christie's prototypes were however purchased by the Soviet Union, and were to be developed into the BT tanks and eventually, on the eve of World War II, the famous T-34. The success of the BT series, when observed by Fuller at Russian Army maneuvers influenced the British to buy a Christie M1931 tank, imported as a "Tractor", which led to Christie's suspension incorporated into British cruiser tank designs such as the A13 Cruiser Mk IV, Crusader, and others.

Today it may be difficult to understand why the tank idea found such resistance from the leadership of several armies. Part of the explanation is that the entire automotive industry was in its infancy. Tanks were rightly considered unreliable, troublesome equipment as late as the early 1930s. Weak engines, poor transmissions, and fragile, short-life tracks contributed to this reputation.

The otherwise-incomprehensible resistance to tanks from 'traditional' military leadership can be partly understood in this light; a tank battalion that loses most of its vehicles due to mechanical failure on a 50-mile movement is not a reliable asset in combat. The international success of the Vickers Six-Ton tank is due more to its high reliability than any brilliance in the design. However, as the decade passed, engines, transmissions and tracks all improved. By the beginning of World War II, reliable engines and transmissions, as well as high-speed suspension designs were all available.

A final trend in the between-the-wars period was changes in manufacturing methods. France pioneered the use of very large castings to form gun mantlets, turrets and eventually, with the SOMUA S35, entire tank hulls. The widespread use of casting was copied by the US and USSR, and to a lesser extent in the UK. Casting enables the fast manufacture of ballistically well-shaped components. Germany never made much use of large cast components, limiting casting to smaller items such as mantlets.

Welding gradually replaced riveting and bolting as a means of fastening rolled armor plate together. Rivets can shear off when struck by enemy fire, resulting in additional crew casualties. Germany and the USSR led the way with welding, although the US followed closely. Riveting and bolting remained in use in some countries such as Hungary, Japan, and Italy, and to a lesser extent, in the United Kingdom right to the end of World War II.

Finally, the US and USSR led the way in rationalizing designs for fast production, eliminating unnecessary components or manufacturing steps that added little value. In contrast, French and German pre-war (and even wartime) tanks often incorporated features that added cost or manufacturing complexity out of proportion to their combat value.

== United Kingdom ==
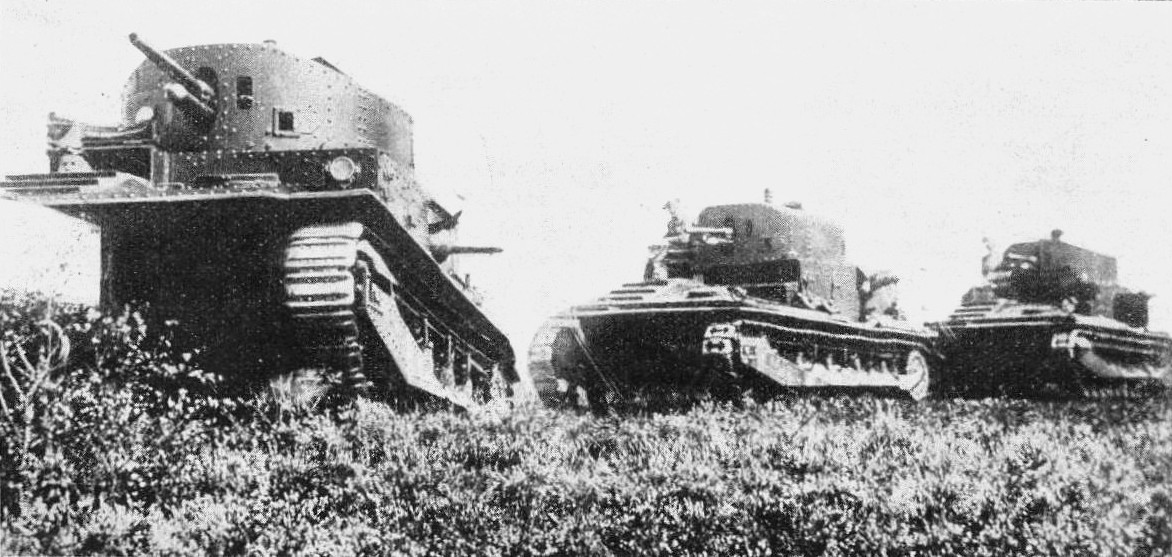
Vickers Medium Mark I tanks on a manoeuvre in England, 1930

Following World War I, many experiments involving armoured vehicles were conducted in Britain. The most significant advances were made in the areas of suspensions, tracks, communications, and the organization of these vehicles on the battlefield. British designs, particularly those from Vickers-Armstrong, formed the basis for many of the most common tanks of the 1930s and early World War II. The Vickers Six Ton Tank was the basis for the Polish 7TP, the Soviet T-26, and was a major influence on the Italian M-11 and M-13 series and the Czech LT-35. The six-ton Vickers tank was not adopted by the British Army.

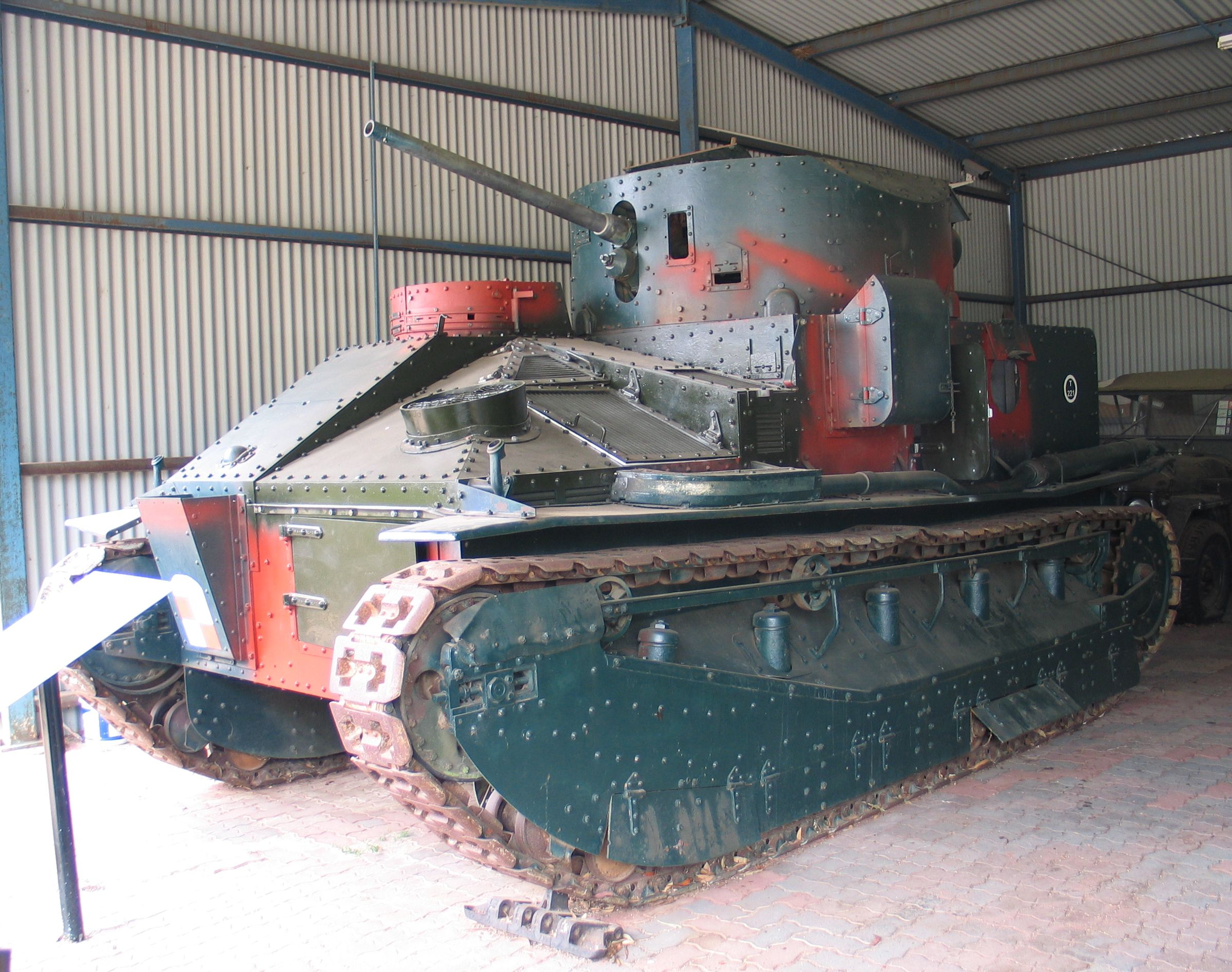
A Vickers Medium Mark II tank

The Vickers Medium Mk II, which combined some of the best traits of World War I tanks into a much faster tank, had a fully rotating turret on top like the FT, and mounted a dual-use 3-pounder gun (that could fire both high-explosive and anti-tank shells) with a coaxial machine gun. It also had a radio, a machine-gunner position in the front of the hull, and some limited use of sloped armour. Some of these tanks served in World War II, though it was more significant for features that were utilized in later tank designs.

The Vickers Carden-Loyd machine gun carriers influenced the tankette concept through export which led to similar designs such as the Soviet T-27, Italian CV-33, German Panzer I and other copies.

The Vickers A1E1 'Independent', was a large heavy tank built in 1925. It had a large main turret and four smaller turrets. This design concept was later used by the Soviet T-28 and T-35 tanks and the German Neubaufahrzeug.

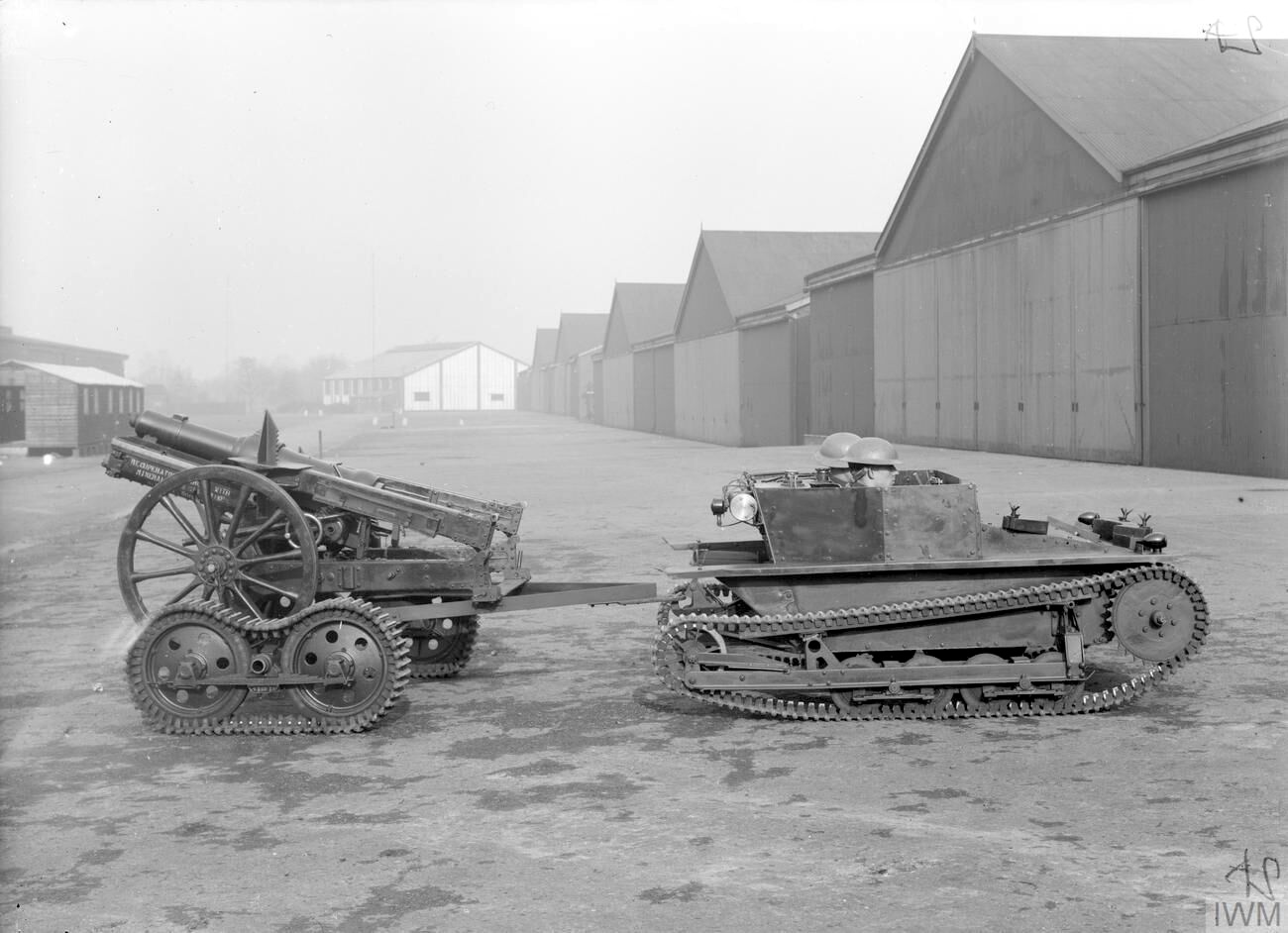
A Carden-Loyd tankette towing a howitzer

Exponents of the replacement of the cavalry function by armoured vehicles were Liddell Hart and Fuller. Their opponents misinterpreted (either mistakenly or deliberately) them as proponents of an all-tank fighting force, though their views did specify that artillery and infantry should be mechanised to make them as fast and manoeuvrable as the tanks they advocated, and experiments were curtailed.

The British Army created the Experimental Mechanised Force in the late 1920s. This was a small Brigade-sized unit developed to field-test the use of tanks and other vehicles. The unit pioneered the extensive use of radio to control widely separated small units but was relatively short-lived.

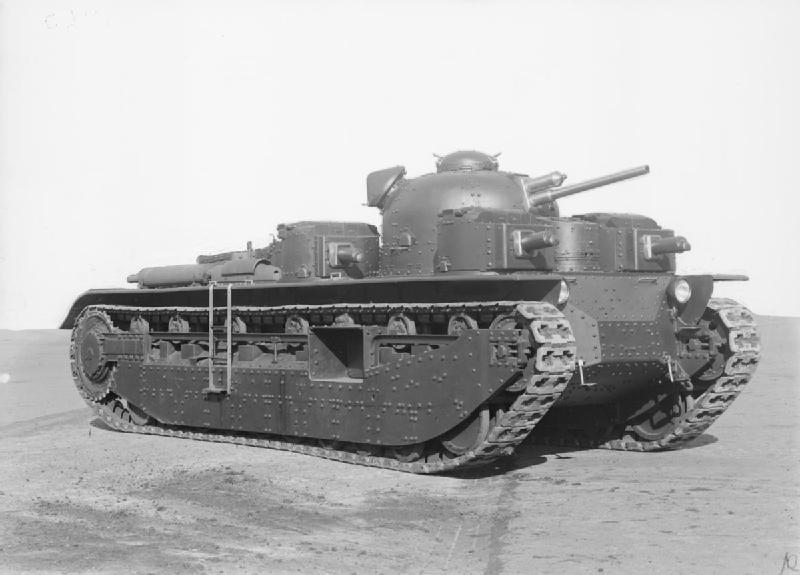
A Vickers A1E1 "Independent"

By the 1930s, British experiments, and their strategic situation, led to a tank development programme with three main types of tank: light, cruiser, and infantry. Infantry tanks were tasked with the support of dismounted infantry. The maximum speed requirement matched the walking pace of a rifleman, and the armour on these tanks was expected to be heavy enough to provide immunity to towed anti-tank guns. Armament had to be sufficient to suppress or destroy enemy machine gun positions and bunkers. Cruiser tanks were tasked with the traditional cavalry roles of pursuit and exploitation, working relatively independently of the infantry. This led to cruiser tank designs having great speed. To achieve this they were lightly armoured and tended to carry anti-tank armament. Light tanks were tasked with reconnaissance and constabulary-type colonial roles, with cheapness the major design factor. Vickers-Armstrong built a series of light tanks, to be sold either to the British Army, who wanted to keep costs down, or to foreign militaries.

== France ==
The French used a very wide range of tanks, including many unique types. France was the second largest tank producer in the world, behind the Soviet Union (see French armoured fighting vehicle production during World War II). Their cavalry tank class filled the role of what are now called MBTs. They also fielded a heavy tank design, and several lighter types for scouting and infantry support. In addition to these types, they were also working on super-heavy breakthrough tanks (FCM F1). The French didn't have an independent Tank Corps. All tanks belonged to either the Infantry or the Cavalry.

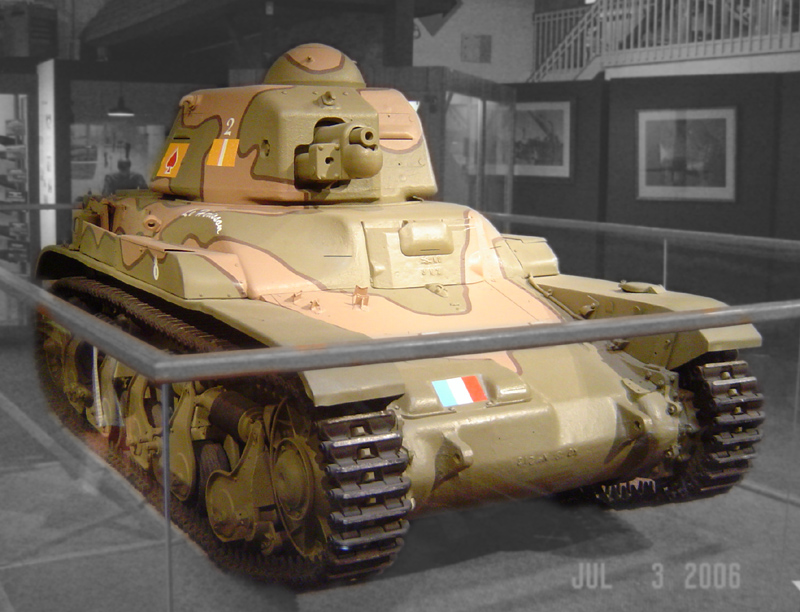
The French Renault R35 tank

- Infantry Tanks (Chars)
  - Light Tanks (Chars Légers), generally similar to other nations' light tanks, though they were intended to be used more for infantry support rather than scouting, and as such were better armoured but slower than many other light tanks. The Renault R35 was the most common type; small numbers of the futuristic FCM 36 were built. The R35 was also exported to several eastern European countries, including Romania and Poland.
  - Medium Tanks (Chars de Bataille), these were in fact meant to be specialised breakthrough tanks (Char D1, Char D2, Char B1).
  - Heavy Tanks (Chars Lourds); only the World War I-vintage Char 2C was ever operational in this class, being the reason why the breakthrough role was delegated to the Chars de Bataille.
- Cavalry Tanks (Automitrailleuses). These classes focused on speed in addition to the power and protection of other tank designs, and were intended for both anti-tank and anti-personnel work. As by law all tanks (Chars) had to be part of the Infantry, the Cavalry called its tanks Automitrailleuses. These included the Hotchkiss H35.
  - Armoured Combat Tanks (AMCs or Automitrailleuses de Combat), a medium tank that sacrificed some armour for speed, and had similar armament to the infantry tanks (AMC 34, AMC 35, SOMUA S35).
  - Armoured Reconnaissance (AMRs or Automitrailleuses de Reconnaissance), essentially light tanks (AMR 33;AMR 35), but specifically intended for general reconnaissance and maintaining a security screen. Specialised reconnaissance however would be carried out by AMD's or Automitrailleuses de Découverte, typically armoured cars or half-tracks.

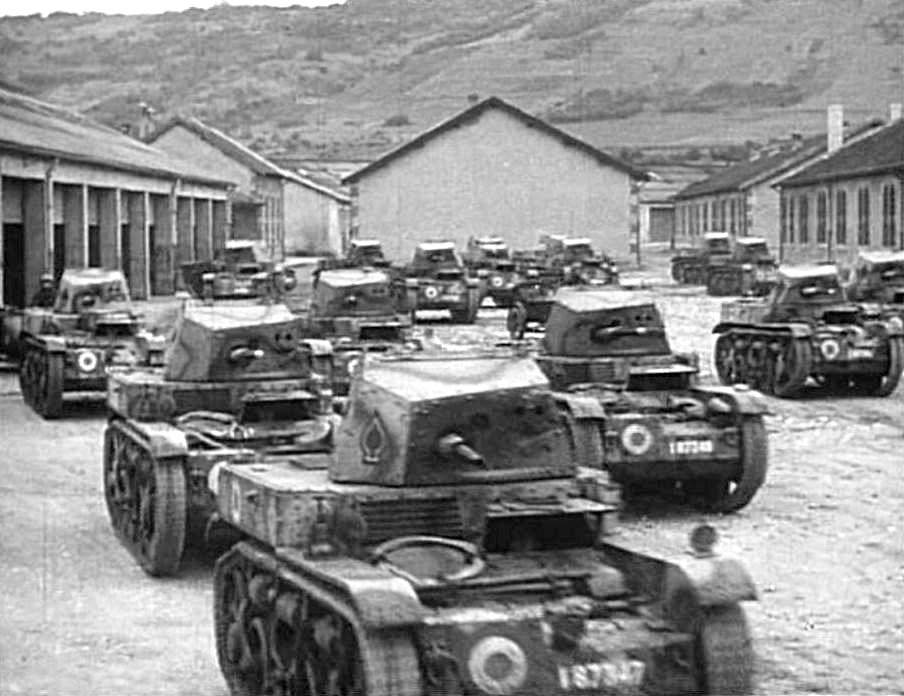
French 13.2 mm-armed AMR 35s, belonging to 4e RDP, 1re DLM.

The Renault FT had a long life and saw use in World War II and even later in Indochina. It was utilised as far away as in China, during the Chinese Civil wars, and versions of the tank were used both against and by the Japanese during the invasion of China. A large number found their way into both Republican and Nationalist hands during the Spanish Civil War. They were used in the Russian Revolution by both the Bolsheviks and the White Russians, and later by the Finns against the Soviets. France exported the FT right up to World War II. The design was also developed by the Italians as the Fiat 3000 and the USSR as the T-18.

By the mid-1930s the French Army was replacing the ageing FT fleet with a mixed force of light tanks both in the Infantry and Cavalry branches, as well as medium and heavy tanks. The Infantry light tanks included the Renault R 35, which followed the FT concept quite closely with its very small size, two-man crew, and short 37 mm gun armament. It was, however, heavily armored. The R 35 was mostly used to equip the independent tank battalions, an armoured reserve allocated at army level and intended to reinforce infantry divisions in breakthrough operations. French infantry divisions normally had no organic tank component. The R 35 was exported to Poland and Romania. The cavalry had the similar Hotchkiss H 35, armed with the same 37 mm, as well as light recon tanks such as the AMR 35.

France also produced what may have been the best tank of the 1930s, the SOMUA S35. This tank equipped the armoured divisions of the Cavalry which had to execute the exploitation phase of a battle and was probably the best combination of armour, firepower and mobility prior to the appearance of the German PzKpfw IV Ausf. F2 and Soviet T-34. The S 35 had a long 47 mm gun that could kill any tank then in service, as well as heavy cast armour and good speed.

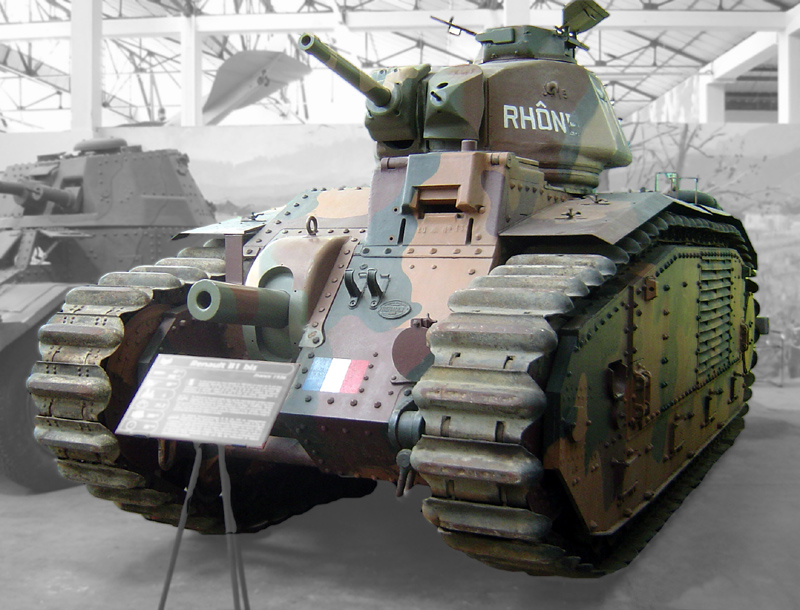
A Char B1 bis at the Musée des Blindés at Saumur

The French char de bataille Char B1 tank was a very formidable tank, with heavy cast and riveted armour, the same long 47 mm gun as in the S 35, and a hull-mounted 75 mm howitzer. All Char B1s were equipped with radio and the tank was nearly invulnerable to most tanks and towed antitank guns. They equipped the armoured divisions of the Infantry, which were specialised breakthrough units.

In general, French tanks of the 1930s were well-armoured, innovative vehicles that owed little to foreign designs. However, the light tanks lacked firepower and almost all French tanks were crippled by their one-man turrets. Even the vaunted Char B1 had a commander who was tasked with commanding the vehicle, aiming the main gun, and loading the main gun. If he were a platoon leader or company commander, he had the additional tasks of controlling his other units.

Such a heavy set of tasks was overwhelming, and greatly reduced the effectiveness of the tanks. The lack of radios with the light tanks was not seen as a major drawback, since French doctrine called for slow-paced, deliberate manoeuvers in close conformance to plans: the "Methodical Battle" concept, adopted because wargaming showed it to be superior. The role of small unit leaders was to execute plans, not to take the initiative in combat.

This was nearly the opposite of German doctrine, which stressed initiative and decision-making at low command levels (Auftragstaktik). In 1939 a belated effort was made to improve flexibility and increase the number of radios.

Despite the views of Estienne and later Charles de Gaulle, the French general staff failed in defining an effective military doctrine regarding their use, due to the division of labour between infantry and cavalry tanks. In the Battle of France, despite an advantage in number and armour against the Germans, the French tanks were not used to good enough effect. The infantry tanks were only effective in executing the breakthrough phase of a battle; and thus useless as a mobile reserve. Ironically, cooperation with the infantry was poor. The Cavalry units alone were too few in number.

After the Fall of France, work on new designs, such as the Char G1, officially halted, although there was some clandestine designing done. After the liberation of France, the next tank to be introduced would be the ARL 44 heavy tank, which came too late to participate in World War II, but was used post-war for a time.

== Italy ==
Italy imported the French Renault FT and produced a slightly improved clone, the Fiat 3000. A native Italian design was the L6/40, a very small light tank with a 20 mm Breda cannon and rivetted construction. A medium tank, based on the Vickers Six-Tonner, was the M-11-M13 series. This tank had a very good 47 mm gun, but very thin armor. Italy also produced a large number of CV-33 and CV-35 tankettes based on the Vickers-Carden-Loyd concept.

== Soviet Union ==
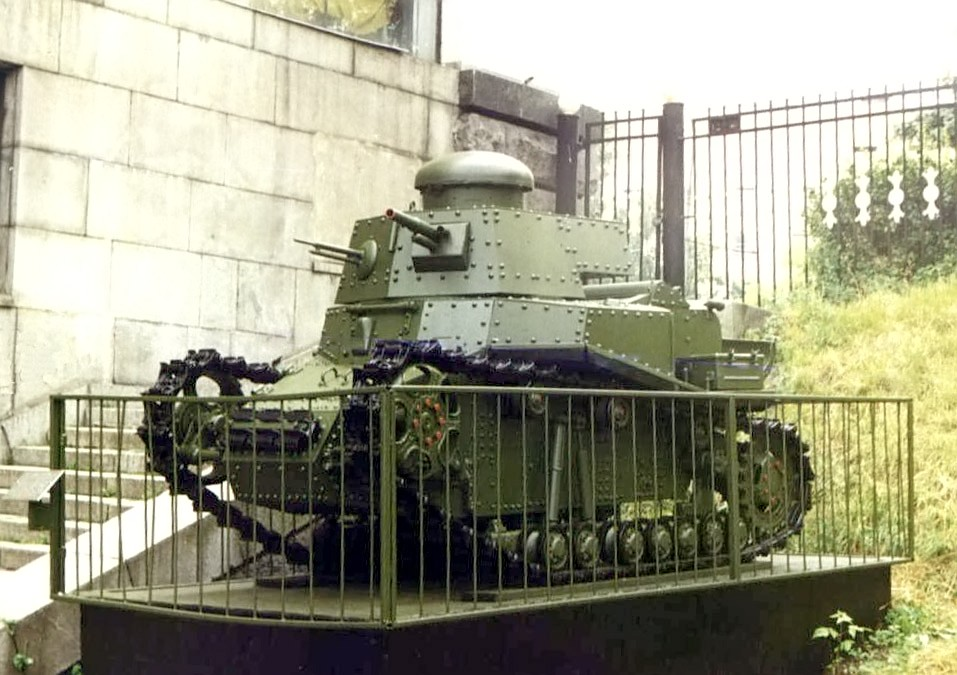
T-18 light tank

The Soviet Union's efforts in tank design and production were influenced by the Russian Civil War and the growth of Soviet industry. During the civil war, the use of armored trains and artillery trains were common. This tended to lead to a greater interest in tanks and armored cars compared to some western nations. The rapid growth of heavy industry in the USSR under the Five-Year plans made a large tank fleet possible.

Initially, the tanks and armored cars in Soviet hands were a mix of Renault FT imports and a few British tanks left behind in the civil war. The first Soviet tank, the T-18 (sometimes called MS-1) was a fairly close copy of the FT, but with improved suspension and a larger turret. Stalin's enthusiasm for industrialisation and mechanisation drove an aggressive military development program, resulting in by far the largest and broadest tank inventory of all nations by the late 1930s.

In 1926, under a secret annex to the Treaty of Rapallo, the Soviet Union and Germany set up a joint tank school at Kazan, which was illegal under the Treaty of Versailles. Both countries learned much about tank design and tactics in this co-operative venture. The Germans provided advice on mechanisation of Soviet heavy industry, and helped develop a sense of professionalism in the Red Army. From 1929, an experimental Mechanised Brigade was formed, training and developing combined-arms tactics with foreign tanks, armoured cars, tractors, and lorries.

The Soviets also spent tens of millions of dollars on U.S. equipment and technology to modernize dozens of automotive and tractor factories, which would later produce tanks and armoured vehicles.

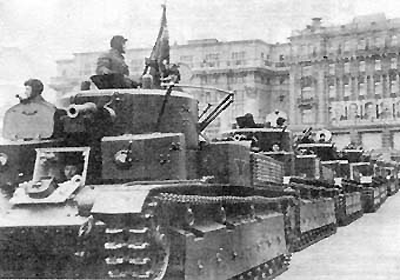
The multi-turreted T-28 medium tank. The T-28 was designed as an infantry support tank and was used to break through fortifications.

Based on a mixed force of foreign tanks and imported prototypes, the Soviets developed an impressive domestic design and production capability. The T-26 light tank was based on the Vickers E (as were many other tanks of the period), chosen after it beat a Soviet FT derivative in trials. The Soviets purchased some U.S. Christie M1930 tank prototypes, from which they developed the BT series of fast tanks. They also developed the heavier multi-turreted T-28 medium tank and the massive T-35, which followed the design premise of the Vickers A1E1 Independent. Of the tanks produced between 1930 and 1940, 97% were either identical copies of foreign designs, or very closely related improvements. Significantly, the major improvement the Soviet designers made to these foreign designs was an increase in firepower. By 1935, the Red Army ". . . possessed more armoured vehicles, and more tank units than the rest of the world combined." (Zaloga 1984, p. 107)

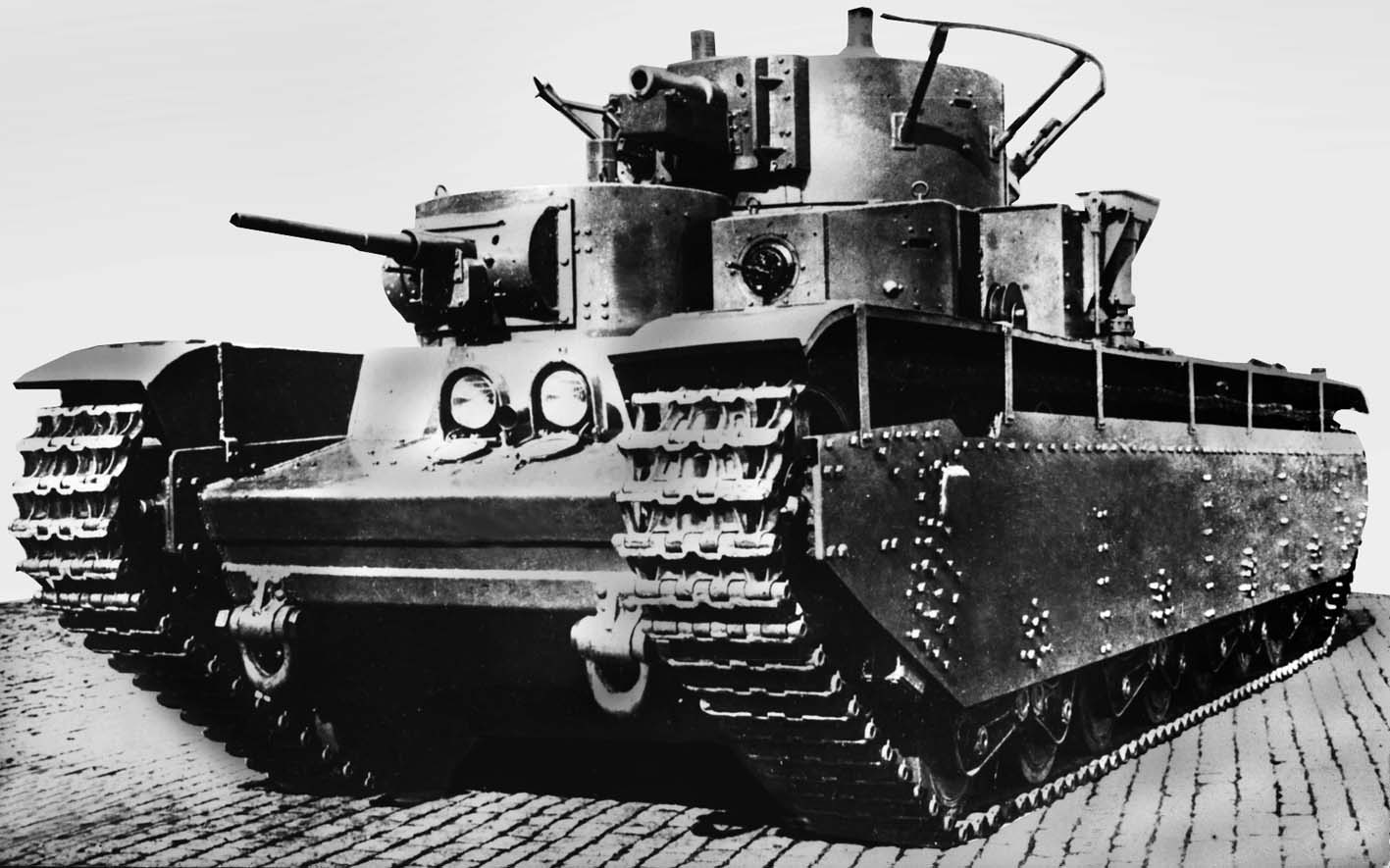
The Soviet T-35 tank. The tank has 5 turrets, 3 with cannons, 2 with machine guns.

But from 1937 to 1941, the Red Army's officer corps, the armour design bureaux, and leadership of the factories were gutted by Stalin's Great Purge. Approximately 54,000 officers were repressed. Military knowledge completely stagnated and armoured vehicle production dropped drastically (though still remaining the world's largest). Training and readiness dropped to very low levels. This repression continued until the eve of the war.

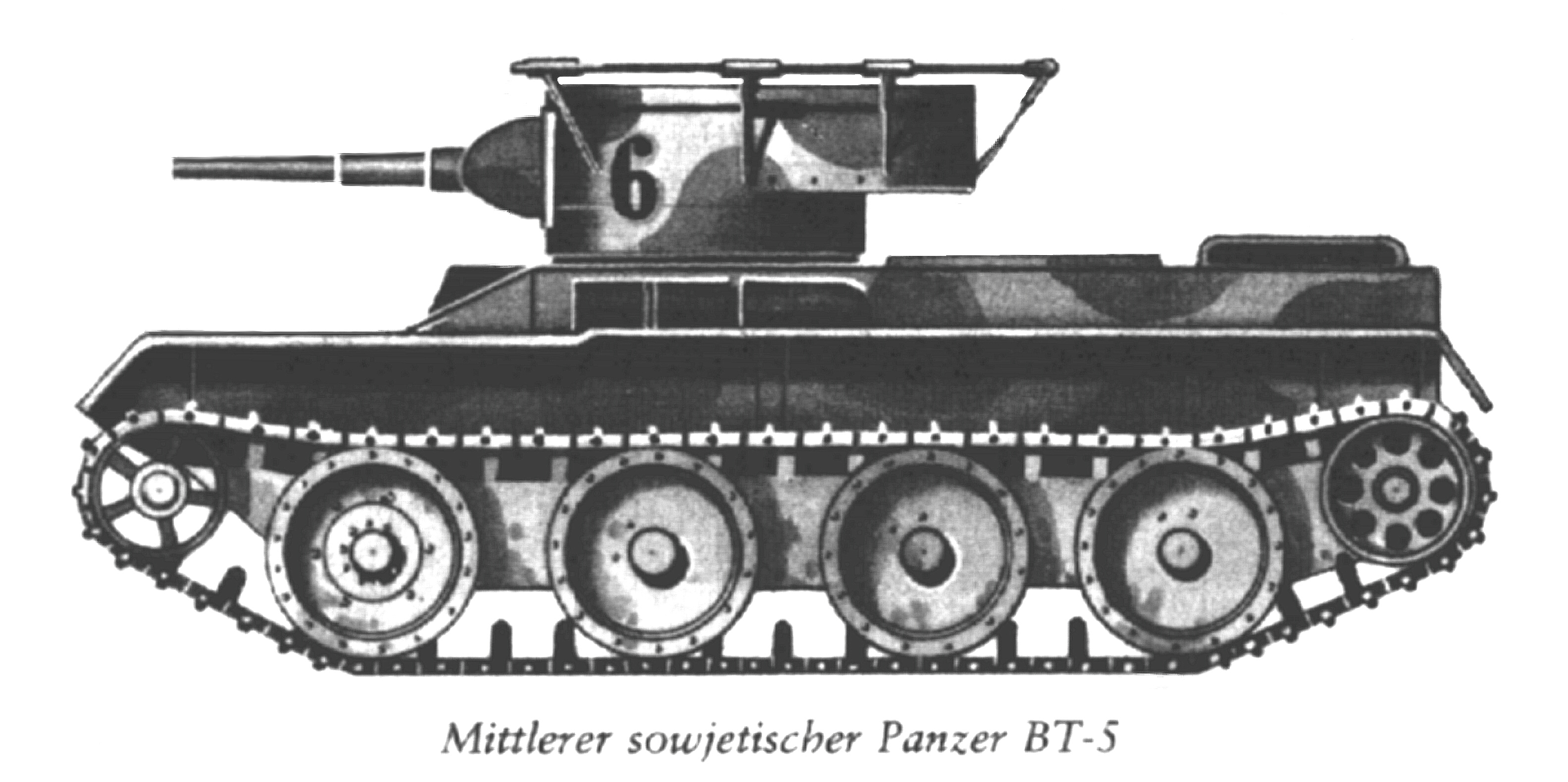
The BT-5 Fast Tank; the BT series led to the development of the T-34.

The participation by Soviet 'volunteer' tank units in the Spanish Civil War was decisive in forming Soviet tank designs for World War II. Soviet tanks dominated their foreign rivals in Spain due to their firepower, but their thin armor, in common with most tanks of the period, made them vulnerable to the new towed antitank guns being supplied to Infantry units. This finding led directly to a new generation of Soviet tanks.

By the eve of World War II, the Soviet Union had some of the world's best tanks (including the T-34 and KV-1, which were basically a generation ahead, coming as a shock to the Wehrmacht). However, the poor training and readiness status of most Red Army units led to a catastrophic defeat of the enormous Soviet Mechanised Corps during the opening phases of Operation Barbarossa, Germany's 1941 invasion of the Soviet Union. Despite their generally good equipment, the Red Army's operational capabilities and motorised logistic support were inferior.

== Czechoslovakia ==
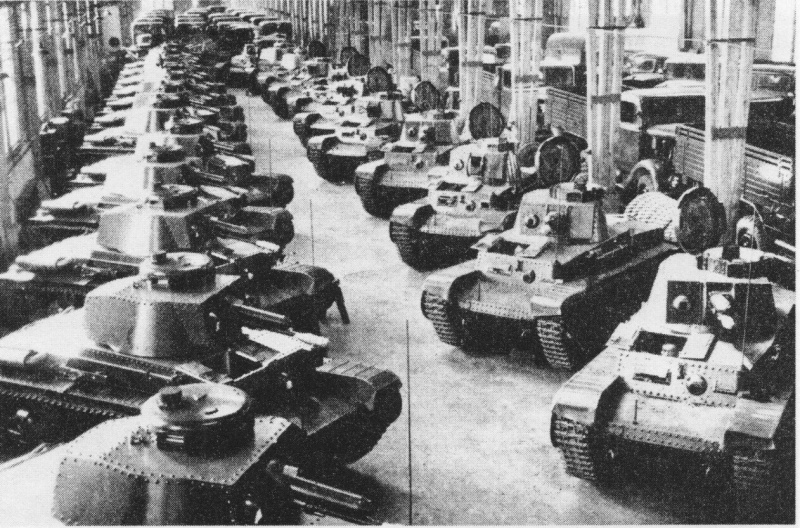
LT vz. 35 tanks in the Škoda Works

The Czechoslovak Army bought three Carden-Loyd tankettes and a production licence for them in 1930, Českomoravská Kolben-Daněk building four copies that same year as prototypes for future orders. The Carden-Loyds were evaluated during the Fall manoeuvres and revealed numerous problems: the crews had very poor vision through the narrow slits, the machine gun had a very narrow field of fire and the crewmen had a difficult time communicating. Furthermore, they were slow, underpowered and often broke down.

One of the P-1 prototypes was rebuilt to address these issues with additional vision ports in all directions, internal ammunition storage and the machine gun's field of fire increased to 60°. It was extensively tested during 1931–32 and a few other changes were made as a result. The armor was increased from 6 to 8 mm (0.24 to 0.31 in) and from 9 to 12 mm (0.35 to 0.47 in) and a fixed machine gun was added for the driver.

Two of the other prototypes were rebuilt to the same standard; all three were officially accepted by the Army on 17 October 1933. The order for seventy was placed on 19 April 1933, all being delivered by October 1934. The Škoda T-21 (original designation was Škoda Š-IIc) was Škoda's contribution to the IIc army category (medium tanks for general use) and a direct competitor to Praga V-8-H.

In the early thirties both Praga and Škoda (main competitors for both Czechoslovak army contracts but also with regard to export) designed some successful light tanks (LT-35, later the LT-38) but both companies produced some unsuccessful infantry support tank designs, notably the Praga P-IIb and Škoda Š-IIb. Subsequently, both companies worked together to design a joint infantry tank project, designated ŠP-IIb. Both companies however also continued to work on their own private attempts to build IIb/IIc category prototypes. These private attempts would later become the Praga V-8-H and Škoda T-21.

The main design work on the T-21 began as early as September 1936. The first prototype was finished in May 1937 and first variant from May 1937 was the original Š-IIc. The engine development was delayed and the prototype was fitted (in order to save time) with a 190 hp 13-liter V6, originally intended for the Š-III breakthrough tank prototype. In September 1937, the V6 engine was removed and the original Škoda engine intended for it was installed. It still failed its tests which were stopped in November, marking the end of the 1st development stage of T-21.

By that time the Ministry of Defence committee was looking for a suitable Czechoslovak medium tank for the army but the Š-IIc did not to make the June 1938 army tests deadline and as a result this was the end of the T-21 as a potential Czechoslovak army medium tank. In any case, after the German occupation of Czechoslovakia that was no longer possible, not without German consent at least.

During the early months of occupation German delegations visited the Škoda factory and tests were performed with the Š-IIc prototype which, by 22.5.1939, had been renamed, to fit the German nomenclature principles to Škoda T-21 (T = tank, 2 = medium, 1 = 1st variant). The Germans initially wanted to test it at Kummersdorf, but did not show too much interest in the design and instead the Germans decided to produce an improved version, which was named T-22.

The British Carden-Lloyd tankettes that Czechoslovakia had acquired led to the Czechoslovak designed tank, the Tančík vz. 33 which was assembled from a framework of steel "angle iron" beams, to which armor plates were riveted. The front armor was 12 mm (0.47 in) thick, the sides had a thickness of 8 mm (0.31 in), the top was 6 mm (0.24 in) thick and the bottom plates were 6 mm (0.24 in) in thickness. This was deemed enough to deflect armor-piercing 7.92 mm (0.312 in) bullets fired from distances greater than 125 metres (137 yd) from the front and 185 metres (202 yd) from the sides. Both were supposed to withstand ordinary bullets from over 50 metres (55 yd).

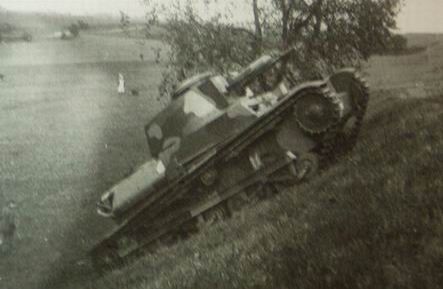
A Czech LT vz. 34 in 1935

The 1.95 litres (119 cu in), water-cooled, 30 horsepower (22 kW), inline 4-cylinder Praga engine sat directly in the fighting compartment. It had a top speed on the road of 35 kilometres per hour (22 mph). The suspension was a modified version of that used in the Carden-Loyd tankettes. The Tančík vz. 33 (literal translation "Tankette model 33") was a Czechoslovak-designed tankette used mainly by Slovakia during World War II. Seventy-four were built. The Germans seized forty when they occupied Bohemia-Moravia in March 1939; there is no record of their use. The Slovaks captured thirty at the same time when they declared independence from Czechoslovakia. In Slovak service it only saw combat during the Slovak National Uprising.

The AH-IV was another Czechoslovak-designed tankette which Českomoravská Kolben-Daněk was determined not to repeat the problems of its earlier Tančík vz. 33 tankette and gave the gunner a turret for better observation and all-around fields of fire for its new AH-IV tankette. It was assembled from a framework of steel "angle iron" beams, to which armor plates between 12 and 6 mm (0.47 and 0.24 in) thick were riveted. The 3.468 litres (211.6 cu in), water-cooled, six-cylinder Praga engine produced 55 horsepower (41 kW) at 2500 rpm.

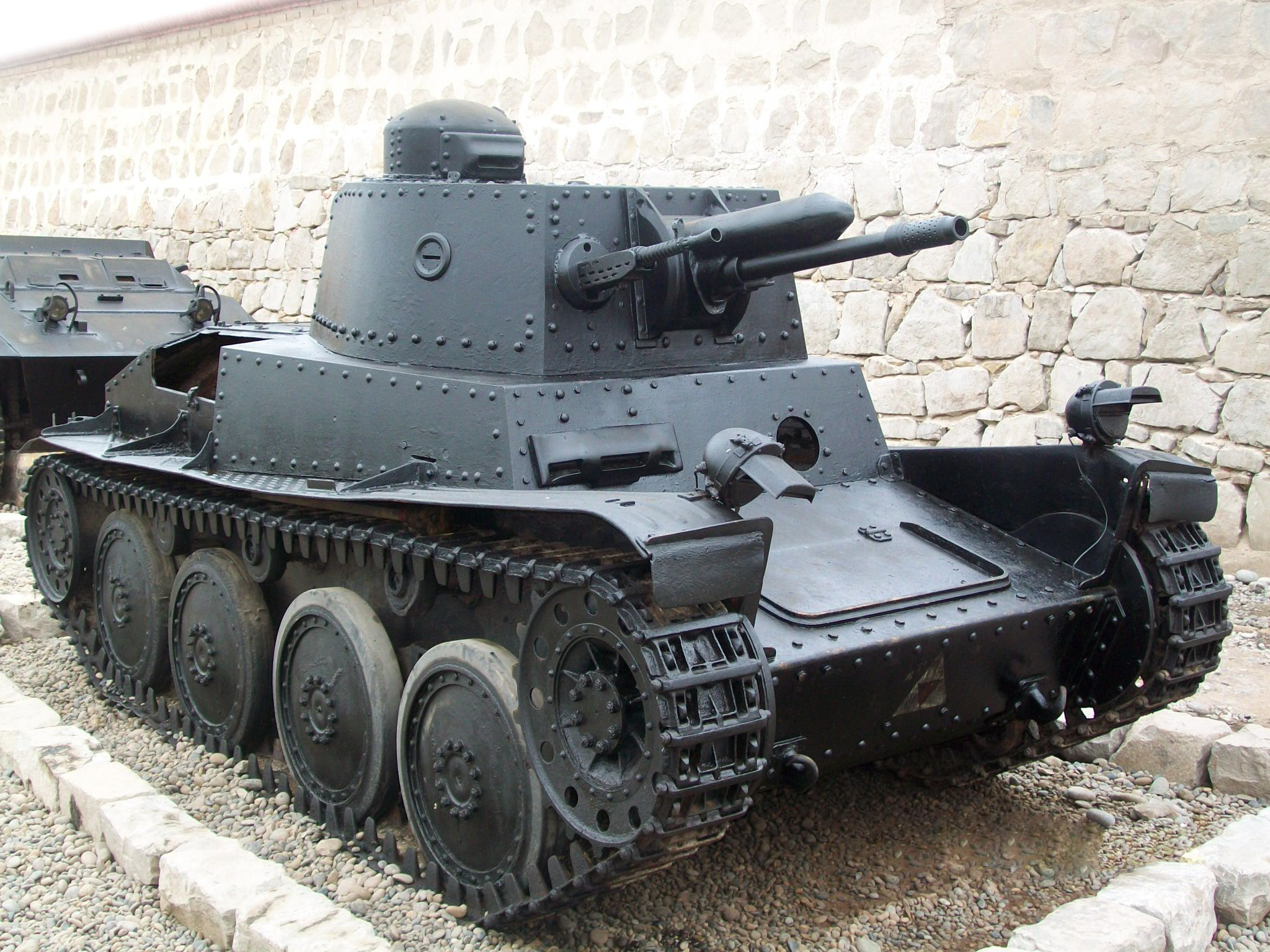
A LT vz. 38 Czech LTL exported to Peru and designated as LTP

It sat in the rear of the fighting compartment and drove the transmission via a driveshaft that ran forward between the driver and commander to the gearbox. It had a top speed on the road of 45 kilometres per hour (28 mph) and a range between 150 and 170 kilometres (93 and 106 mi). The semi-automatic Praga-Wilson transmission had five forward gears and one reverse gear to drive the forward-mounted drive sprocket. The suspension was a smaller version of that used in the Panzerkampfwagen 38(t).

The LT vz. 34, formally designated as Lehký Tank vzor 34 ("Light Tank Model 34") Czechoslovak-designed light tank had been based on that of the Carden-Loyd tankette, of which the Czechs had purchased three, plus a manufacturing license, in 1930. Dissatisfied with the prototypes of the Tančík vz. 33 tankette, the Czechoslovak Army decided that it would be easier to design a light tank from scratch rather than modify a tankette chassis to carry a fully rotating armored turret. 50 were built, the last of which was delivered during 1936.

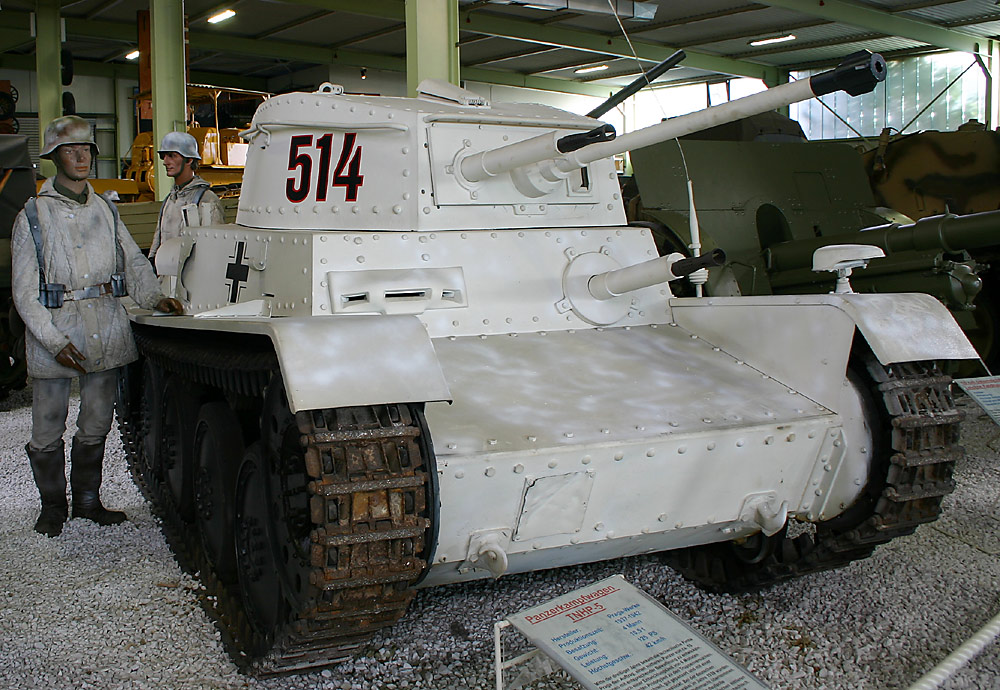
A LT vz. 38 designated as LTH the export version to Switzerland

The next major tank developed in Czechoslovak service had the formal designation Lehký (Light) Tank vzor (Model) 35, but was commonly referred to as the LT vz. 35 or LT-35. In German use it was called the Panzerkampfwagen 35(t), commonly shortened to Panzer 35(t) or abbreviated as Pz.Kpfw. 35(t), and this Czechoslovak-designed light tank ended up being used mainly by Nazi Germany during World War II. The letter (t) stood for tschechisch (German: "Czech").

Four hundred and thirty-four were built; of these the Germans seized two hundred and forty-four when they occupied Bohemia-Moravia in March 1939 and the Slovaks acquired fifty-two when they declared independence from Czechoslovakia at the same time. Others were exported to Bulgaria and Romania. In German service it saw combat during the early years of World War II, notably the Invasion of Poland, the Battle of France and the invasion of the Soviet Union before being retired by 1942.

In 1935, the Czechoslovak tank manufacturer ČKD was looking for a replacement for the LT-35 tank they were jointly producing with Škoda Works. The LT-35 was complex and had shortcomings, and ČKD felt there would be orders both from the expanding Czechoslovak army and for export. ČKD decided to use a suspension with four large wheels for their new tank. It resembled the Christie suspension outwardly, but was actually a conventional leaf spring unit.

The resulting vehicle was reliable and came to be known as LT vz. 38 in Czechoslovak service and designated the Panzer 38(t) in German service. On 1 July 1938, Czechoslovakia ordered 150 of the TNHPS model, which came to be known as the LT vz. 38, and although none had entered service by the time of the German occupation those made were taken over and used by Germany. After the German takeover, Germany ordered continued production of the model as it was considered an excellent tank, especially compared to the Panzer I and Panzer II tanks that were the Panzerwaffe's main tanks.

It was first introduced into German service under the name LTM 38; this was changed on 16 January 1940 to Panzerkampfwagen 38(t). Production of tanks for Germany continued into 1942, and amounted to more than 1,400 examples. In German service the 38(t) was used as a substitute for the Panzer III.

== Germany ==
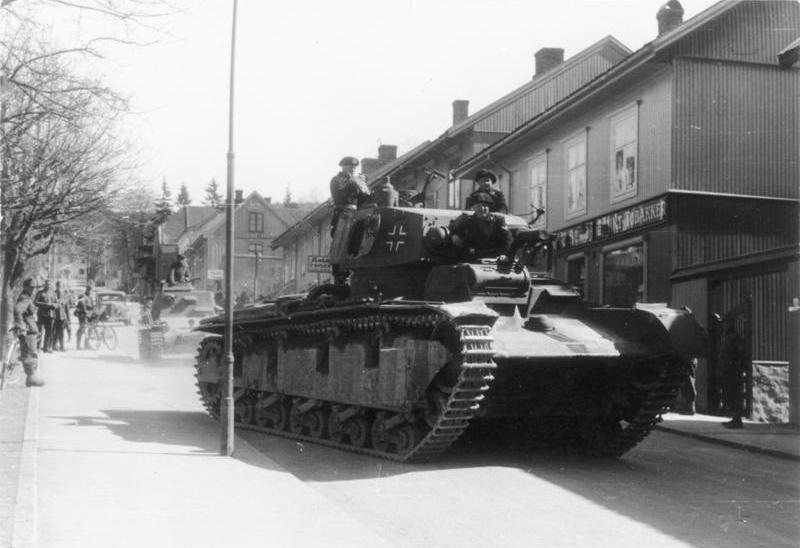
A Neubaufahrzeug ("new construction vehicle") tank in Norway, 1940

Germany, constrained by the terms of the Treaty of Versailles, was not allowed to produce tanks of any kind and only a few armoured cars. In 1926 an unofficial program of tank construction was initiated by Hans von Seeckt, the commander of the Reichswehr. Built by Rheinmetall-Borsig the first Großtraktor ("Large Tractor") was similar to the existing British Mk II Medium Tank, 20 tons with a 75 mm gun. This, and other designs, were tested with Soviet co-operation at Kama tank school in the Russian Urals. In Germany proper dummy tanks were used in training, apparently at the instigation of then-Major Heinz Guderian, a staff tactical instructor. Guderian had read Fuller, Liddell-Hart and other tank warfare theorists and he had the support of his commanders to develop his theories into reality.

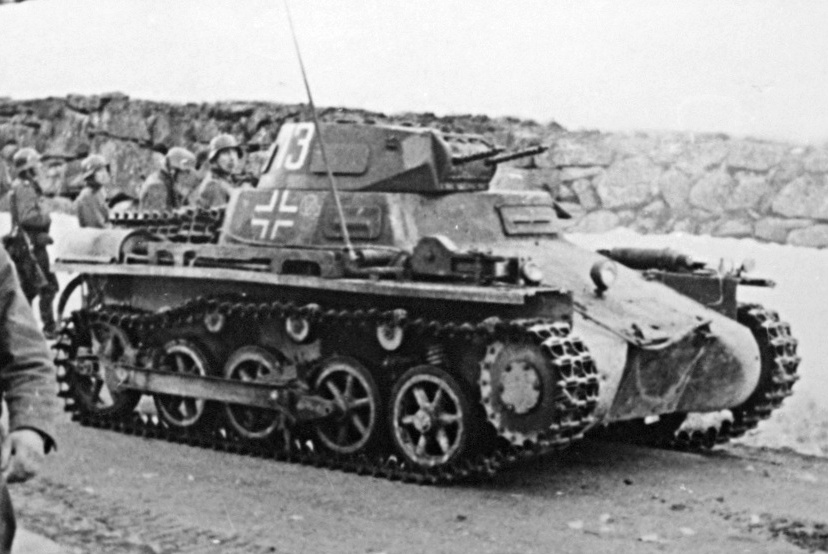
Panzer I Ausf. A in combat during the German invasion of Norway.

In 1931 the German General Staff accepted a plan for two types of tank, a medium tank with a 75 mm gun and a lighter vehicle with a 37 mm gun. While design and then construction work was carried out, the German army used a variety of light tanks based on the British Carden-Loyd tankette chassis. The early tanks were code-named Landwirtschaftlicher Schlepper (La S, "agricultural hauler"), a designation that lasted until 1938. The first of these light tanks ran in early 1934. It was a five-ton Krupp design which was dubbed the LKA1. The new government approved an initial order for 150 in 1934 as the 1A La S Krupp. Around 1,500 of these light tanks were built.

Later German tanks received a new designation, Panzerkampfwagen (abbreviated to 'PzKpfw' or 'PzKw' in German and 'Panzer' in English), which means "armoured fighting vehicle". The first machine to use this was the two-man Panzer I Ausf A influenced by the Carden Loyd tankette, and was a 5.4 ton machine with a 3.5-litre 60 hp (45 kW) petrol engine. It had 13 mm of armour and was armed with twin 7.92 mm machine guns. The more common Ausf B was a little larger to accommodate a 100 hp (75 kW) Maybach engine. Both models were sent to the Spanish Civil War for testing, along with other new German weapons. From the experiences in Spain it quickly became clear that the next generation of tanks would need better armour, greater range and much heavier weapons.

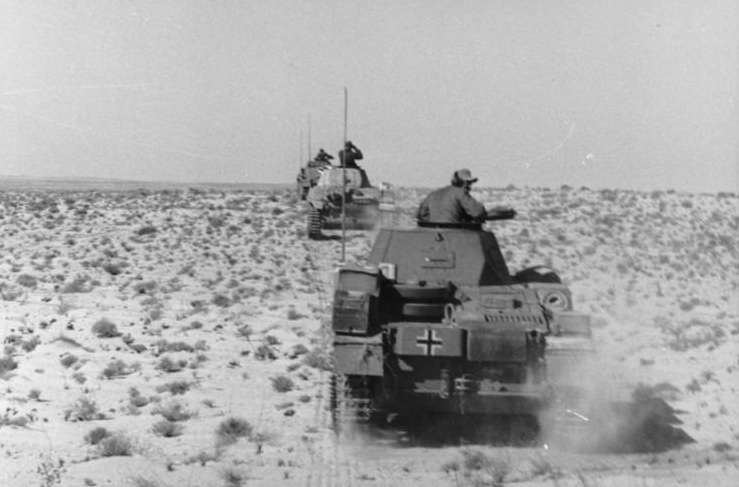
Panzer II tanks cross the desert

The Panzer II was around 50% heavier than the Panzer I. It had a 20 mm Solothurn antitank gun as main armament, as well as improved armour of up to 30 mm. Also sent to Spain from 1937, the Panzer II proved more capable against light infantry, but no better when faced with capable anti-tank guns or other tanks. Despite these weaknesses, production continued until 1941. At the outbreak of war, the German Army had 955 PzKpfw IIs and almost 4,000 were built in total.

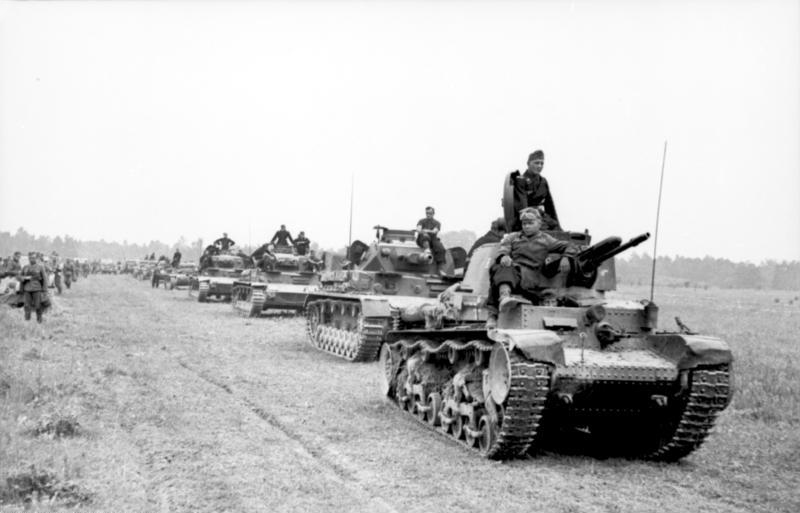
Panzer 35(t) in France, 1940

A major boost to German armour came with the annexation of Czechoslovakia in 1938, giving Germany access to the entire Czech arms industry. The Czechs had two light tank designs later used by the Germans, the Škoda LT-35 and the Českomoravská Kolben-Daněk (ČKD) TNHP. The Škoda was a 10-ton machine with a 37 mm main gun and excellent cross-country capabilities; the ČKD was 8.5 tons and also fitted with a 37 mm gun—due to extensive tests it was an extremely reliable machine with a top quality chassis. Both were taken into the German panzer forces, as the Panzer 35(t) and the Panzer 38(t), and further production was ordered. ČKD was renamed Boehmisch-Maehrische Maschinenfabrik AG (BMM) in 1940 and continued production until 1942, providing the Wehrmacht with 1,168 PzKpfw 38(t) tanks. In 1940, Czech tanks made up around a quarter of the entire German panzer force.

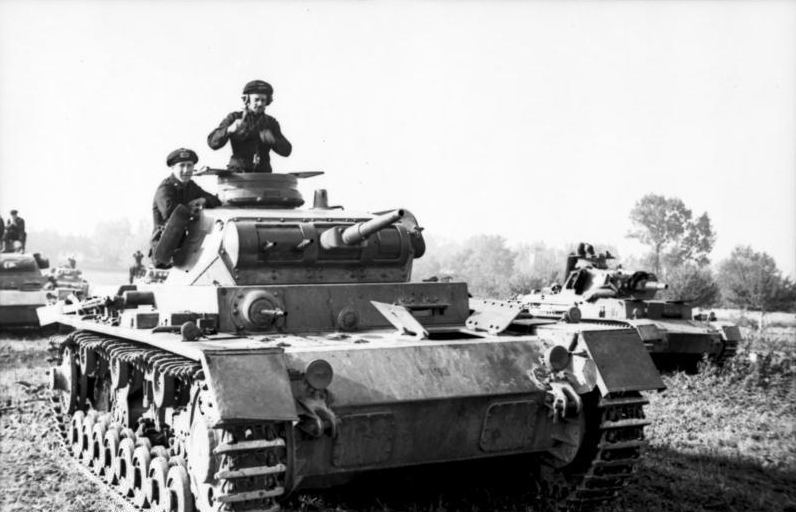
German Panzer III Ausf. D tank, in Poland (1939)

While lighter tanks formed almost the entirety of the German forces, heavier tanks were at least at the prototype stage. In 1934, a number of heavy prototypes were constructed, based around either 75 or 105 mm main guns. Designated Neubaufahrzeug (NbFz) and very similar to contemporary Soviet and British designs, six were built by Rheinmetall and Krupp. Although they were mainly useful for propaganda purposes because only a handful of the tanks were made, three were actually used in combat in Norway. The knowledge of the NbFz and the experiences of the lighter tanks in Spain aided in designing the next generation of tanks, the Panzer III and Panzer IV. The PzIII was the lighter of the two and was intended for use in anti-tank operations, whereas the heavier PzIV was armed with a short-barrel gun and intended for supporting infantry.

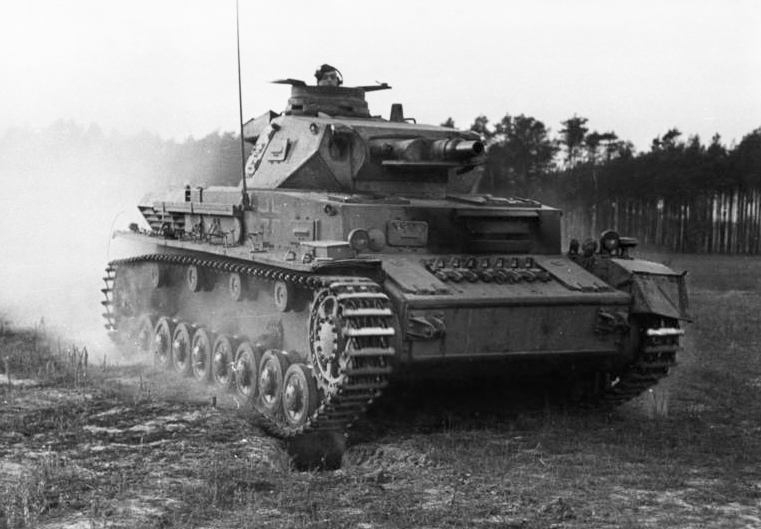
Panzer IV Ausf. C

The Panzer III's 37 mm gun was considered underpowered, yet it was used in the interests of standardisation with the infantry. Contracts for the Zugführerwagen (ZW, "platoon leader vehicle") were issued late in 1936. Its weight was limited to a maximum of 24 tons, because it was required to be able to cross existing bridges. Development work continued until 1938 when the Ausf D went into limited production. This 19 ton machine was powered by a 12-litre 320 hp (239 kW) engine. It had a top speed of 25 mph (40 km/h) and was fitted with 30 mm armour all round.

By the outbreak of war, around fifty had been completed and some saw service in Poland. Full-scale production did not begin until October 1939 as the Ausf E. Around 350 Panzer IIIs Ausf E variant were ready by the invasion of France.

== Japan ==
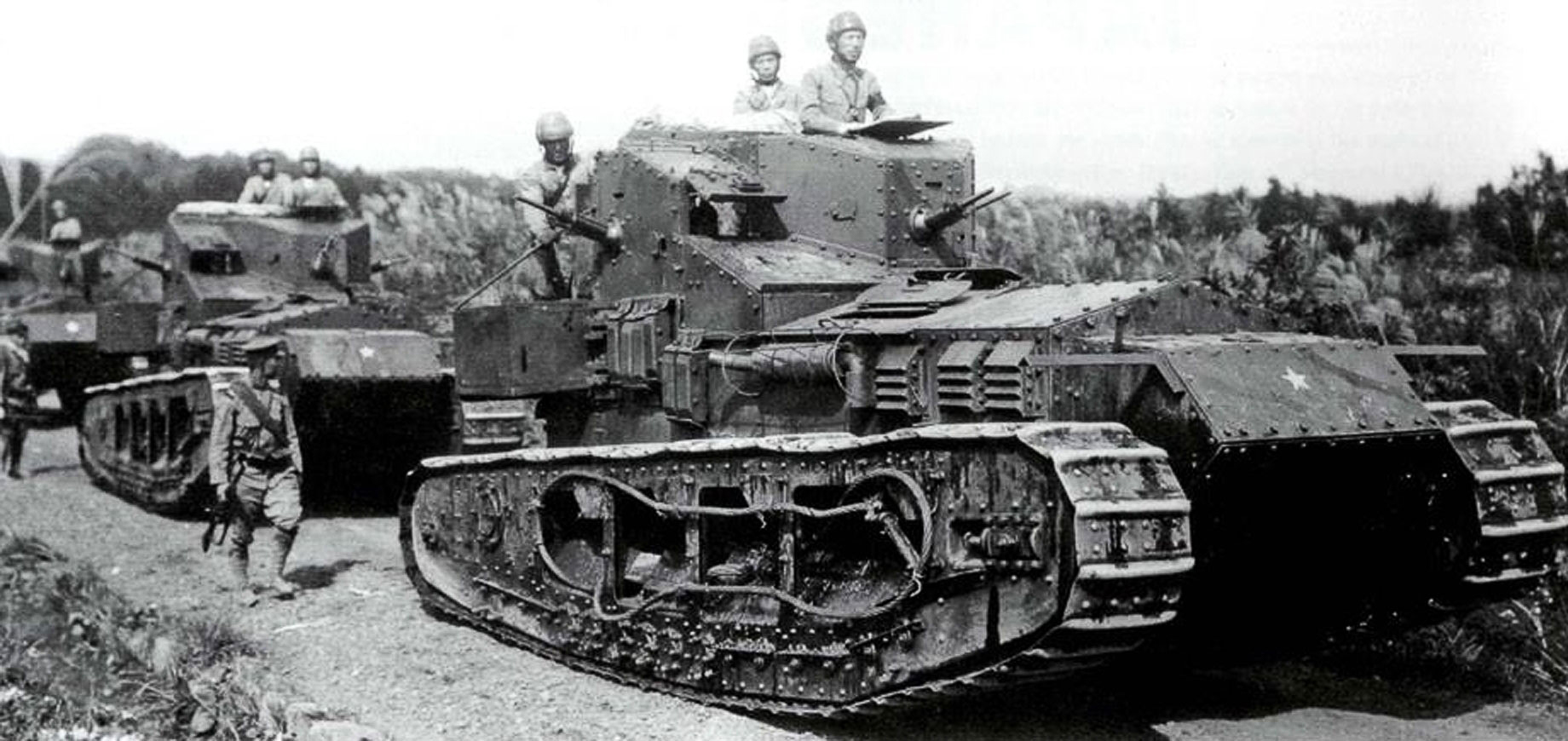
Japanese Whippets.

Like the US Army, the Imperial Japanese Army (IJA) did not have tanks of its own in World War I, so initially it started out by purchasing foreign tanks for evaluation, and then began developing its own designs. After the war, a few Whippets (six) were exported to Japan, where they remained in service until around 1930.

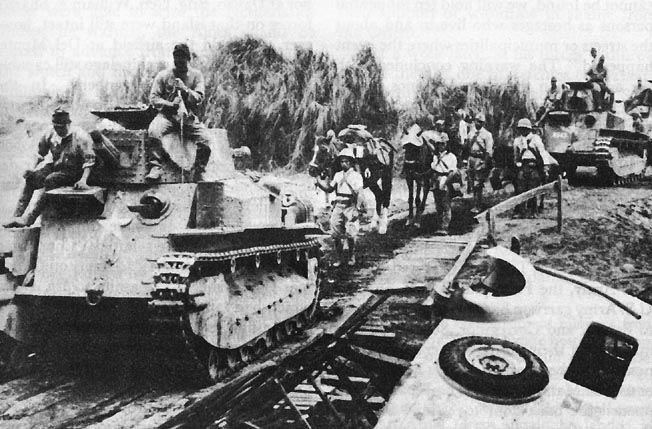
Japanese Type 89 I-Go tanks moving toward Manila, January 1942.

In 1925, in addition to tankettes, the Japanese Army began to design tanks to satisfy its own requirements. Before that year, as with most nations, all tanks in Japanese service had been of foreign design and/or manufacture. The first Japanese design was finished in May 1926 and the prototype Type 87 Chi-I medium tank was completed by February 1927. After trials, the Chi-I was considered too heavy and slow to be used as its main tank. It was decided to create a new design modeled after the Vickers Medium C prototype, which had been bought by the Japanese Army in March 1927. By 1929 the prototype of the Type 89 Chi-Ro (Experimental Tank Number 2) was completed.

The Type 89 Chi-Ro tank was lighter (9.8 tonnes) and shorter than the Chi-I. It contained increased armour (6 to 17 mm) and an improved water-cooled engine. After success in initial tests, the Type 89 became the first mass-produced Japanese tank. The Type 89 had a crew of four, and was armed with a 57 mm Type 90 gun and two 6.5 mm type 91 machine guns. The second version of this tank known as the Type89B Otsu used a diesel engine. The Japanese were among the first to use diesel engines in their tank designs.

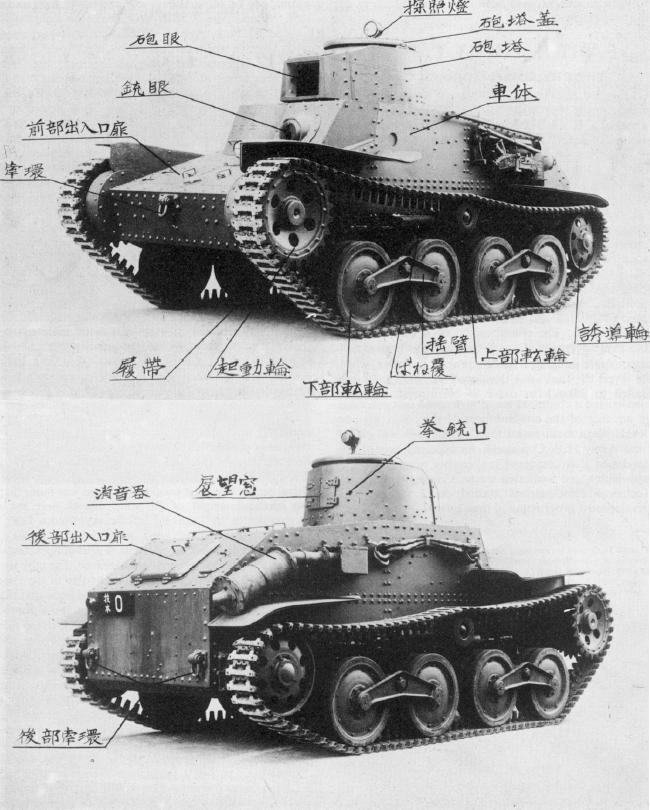
Japanese Type 95 Ha-Go first prototype, 1934

During the 1930s, the Japanese began production of tankettes and light tanks, which were used heavily in Manchuria and China. The Type 94 tankette weighed 3.4 tonnes and was generally used as either a tractor to tow an ammunition trailer, or as a patrol/reconnaissance tank. With a crew of two men and a single 6.5 mm type 91 machine gun, 823 units of the Type 94 were produced and they saw widespread service as late as 1945.

Over twice as large as the Type 94 at (7.4 tonnes), the Type 95 Ha-Go light tank had a complement of three crewmen, a 37 mm gun and the same 6.5 mm type 91 machine gun, and most importantly a diesel engine which would later greatly influence future tank designs in the Soviet Army. Over two-thousand Type 95 tanks were built, and production continued until 1943.

By 1936 the Japanese Army started to look for a replacement for the Type 89. The new Type 97 Chi-Ha medium tank was introduced in 1937. The Type 97 Chi-Ha at 15 tonnes was armed with a low-velocity Type 97 57 mm tank gun and had armour up to 25 mm thick. Later, an improved version known as the Type 97 Shinhoto Chi-Ha remained in production until 1943.

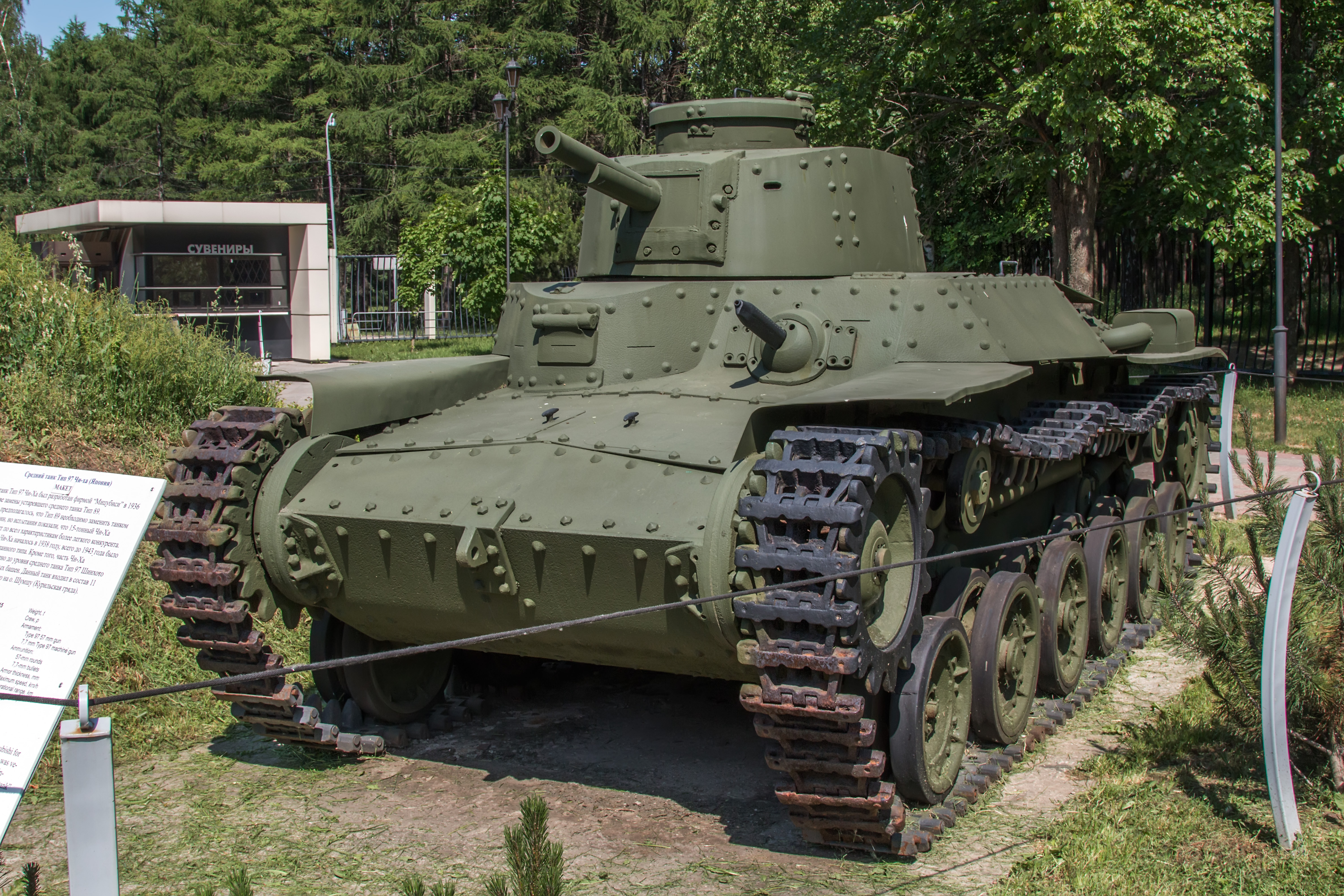
Type 97 Chi-Ha medium tank

The 1930s were the last time that the Japanese military focused on production and design of tanks before World War II. After that period, they were largely preoccupied with establishing naval control and their focus was on production of ships and aircraft. Furthermore, with the emphasis on expansion southward into the Pacific Ocean region, land battles would be largely replaced by naval warfare, and thus, with the exception of small islands, the domain of the Imperial Japanese Navy. With the destruction of the Imperial Navy, the focus on tanks returned when the Japanese military prepared for the defense of the mainland in the last years of World War II.

== United States ==
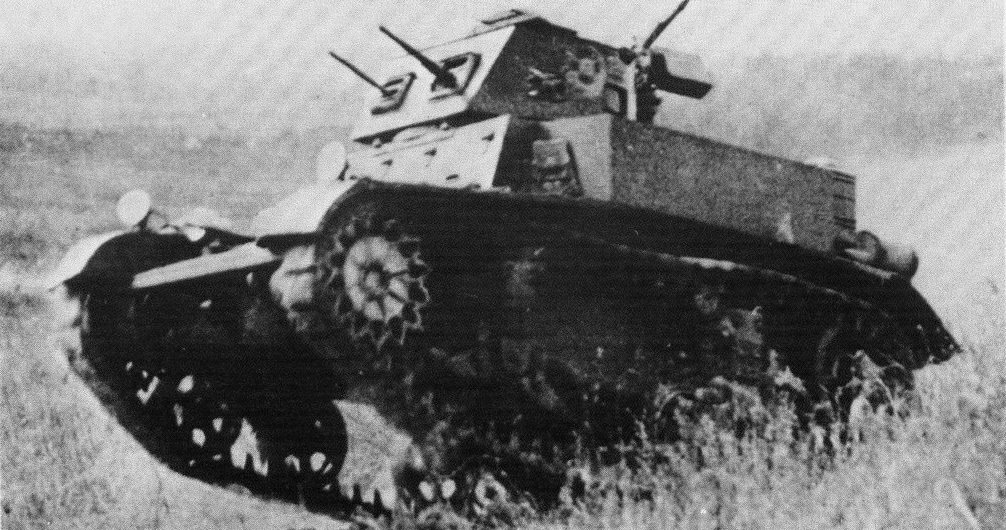
An M1 Combat Car.

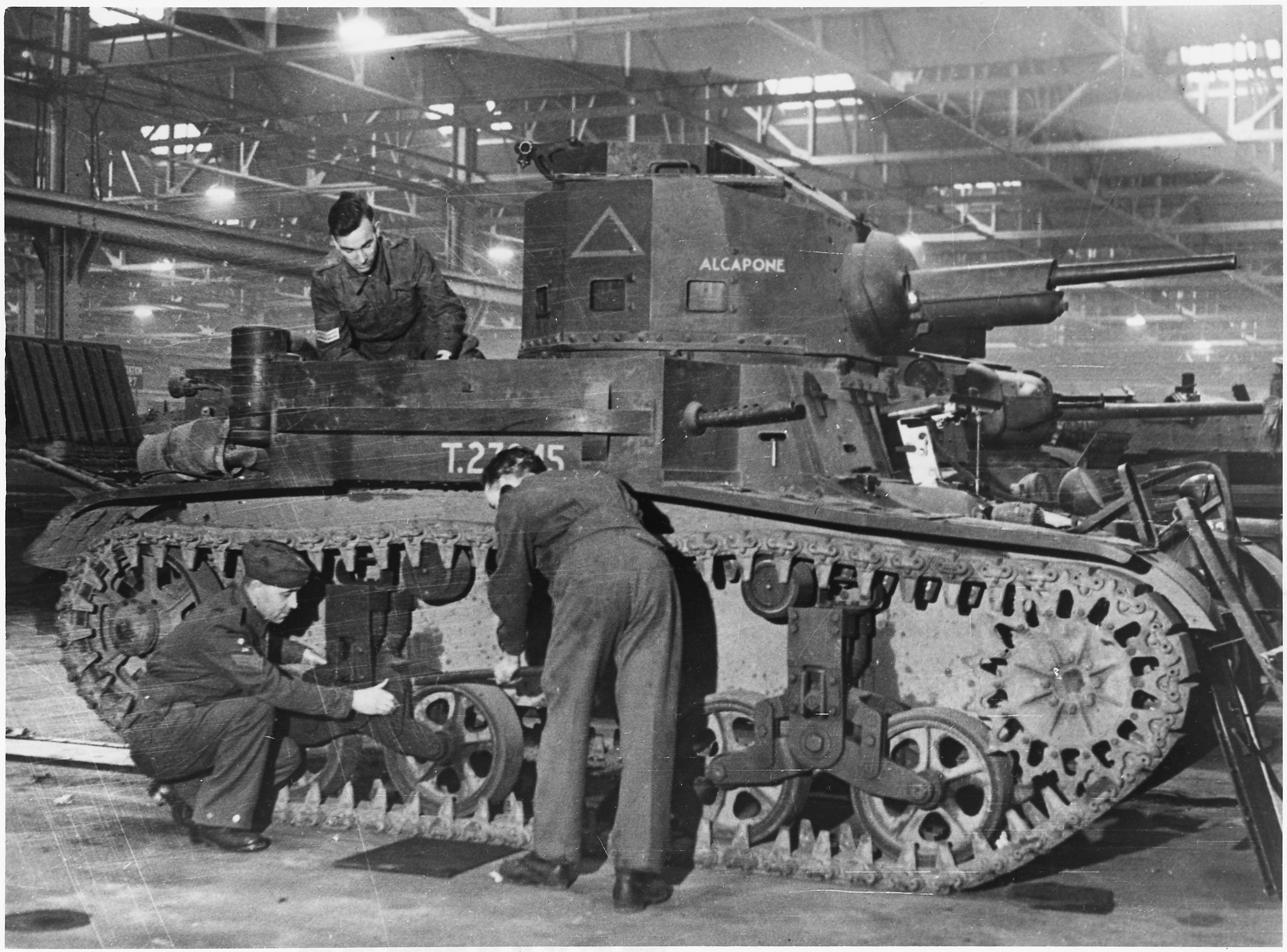
An M2 Light Tank.

After World War I, and still using British and French designs, the United States Tank Corps was reduced in size. Renaults and the new Mk VIII "Liberty Tank" were retained: The National Defense Act of 1920 restricted tanks to infantry use only; as a result, the Tank Corps was disbanded, with the remaining tanks distributed among the infantry.

In 1928, at the request of Secretary of War Dwight F. Davis, the Army formed the Experimental Mechanized Brigade. It consisted of a heavy tank battalion, a light tank battalion, a motorised infantry battalion, a motorised artillery battalion, an engineer company, and a signals company. Due to the use of obsolete equipment, the experiment failed, and the force was disbanded after three months.

In 1934–35, at the request of the Cavalry, three prototype tanks, the T2, T2E1, and T2E2 were produced. Under the terms of the National Defense Act of 1920, tanks were restricted to infantry units. To get around the Defense Act, these tanks were called "combat cars". The M1 series entered service in 1937. The T2, inspired by the British Vickers 6-Ton, was standardised as the M1 Combat Car. The T2E1, a single-turret tank armed with three machine guns, was standardised as the Light Tank M2A1. The T2E2, a two-turret tank with two machine guns, was standardised as the M2A2.

Throughout the interwar period the US produced only a few hundred tanks. From the end of World War I to 1935, only 15 tanks were produced. Most were derivatives or foreign designs or very poor quality private designs. The Christie designs were among the few bright spots, but the US Army acquired only three Christies and did not pursue the idea any further. Budget limitations and the low priority given to the Army meant that there were few resources for building tanks. The US Army instead developed and tested tank components such as suspensions, tracks, and transmissions. This work paid off when production needed to be initiated upon the outbreak of war.

Immediately before and during World War II, US tanks and many other Allied tanks were powered by radial aircraft-type engines. However, the massive production of aircraft caused a shortage of these engines. Because of this, many tanks, particularly the Sherman and the Lee, were powered by as many as five different power-plant arrangements. In addition to Wright and Continental radials, they were powered by Ford GAA, GM truck diesels, and the Chrysler A57 multibank (an arrangement of five 6-cylinder automobile engines that ran as a single unit). After the war, diesel truck-type engines replaced the gasoline-burning radials.

== Other nations ==
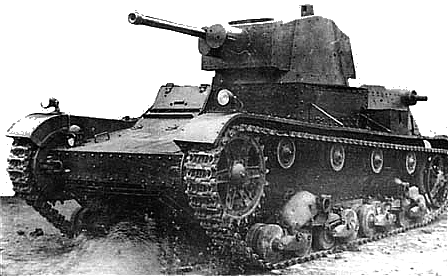
Polish 7TP tank. These were based on the British Vickers 6-Ton

Many other nations that desired tanks could not design or build their own. The 1920s and 1930s saw a widespread export business as smaller or less-industrialized nations purchased tanks abroad. Sometimes, the import of foreign tanks led to the birth of a tank industry in the importing nation.

Poland imported the British Vickers Six-Ton tank and began production of improved models. The pinnacle of this improvement program was the 7TP, which featured a diesel engine and 37 mm gun. Poland also produced the TKS series of tankettes, similar in concept to the Vickers-Carden-Loyd machinegun carriers of Britain and the UE of France. These vehicles had two-man crews, thin armor, and a single ball-mounted light machine gun.

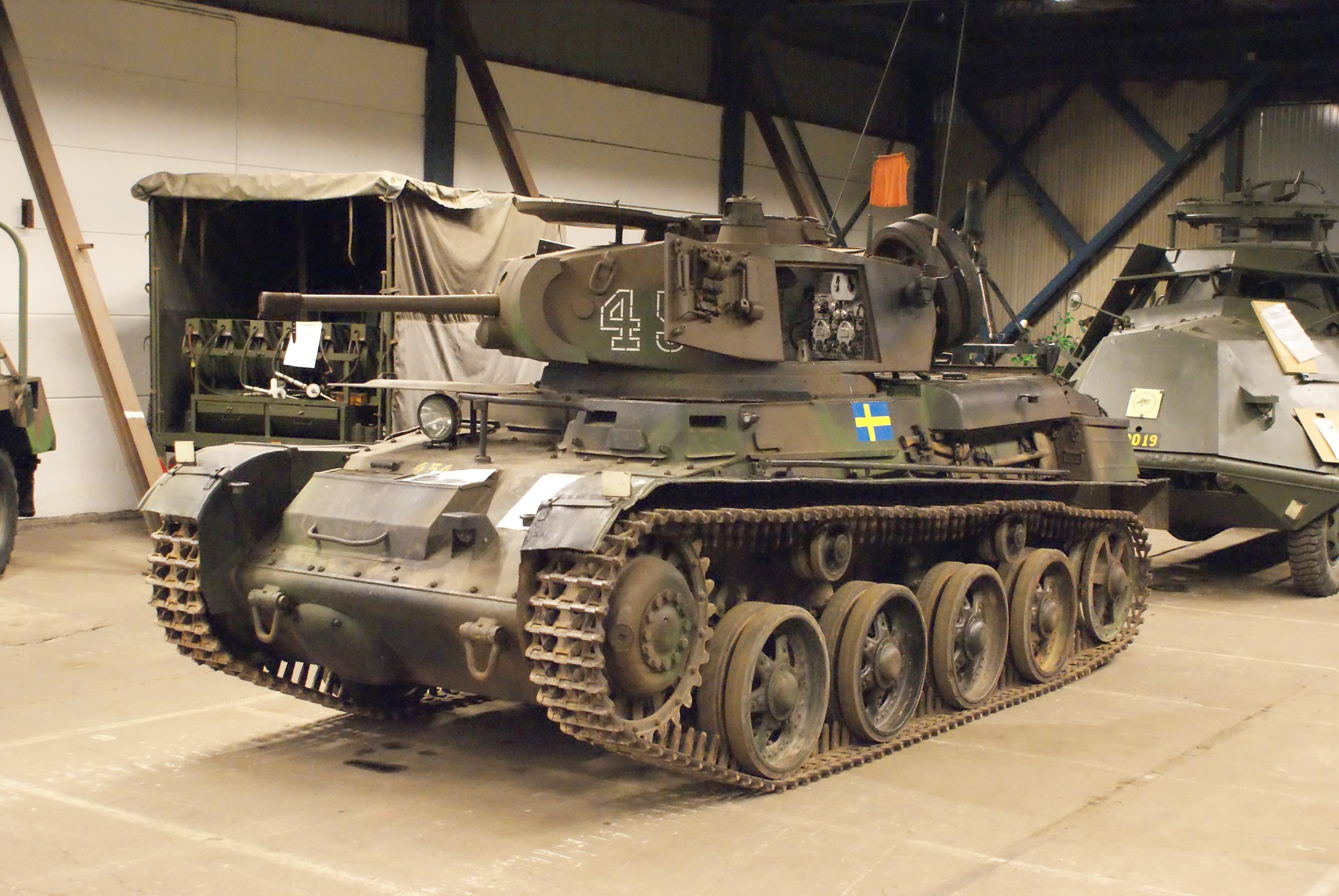
Sweden's Strv m40K – a heavily modified Landsverk L-60

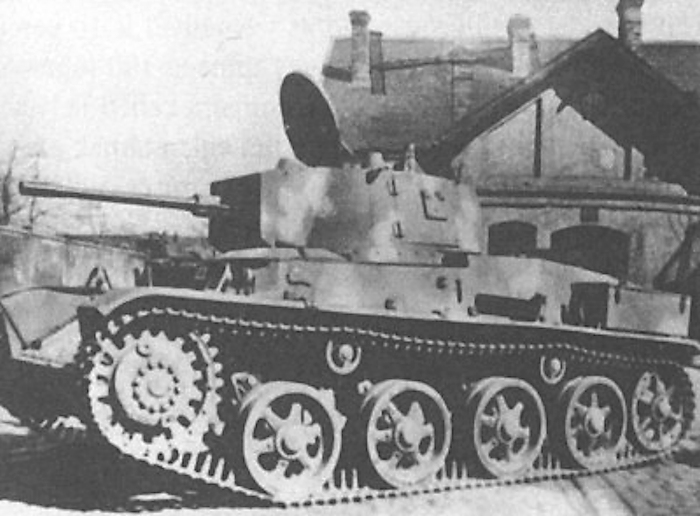
A Hungarian Toldi light tank. These were originally based on Sweden's L-60

Sweden's Landsverk firm designed several advanced light tanks, including the 20 mm armed L-60, which also had welded construction and some sloped armor. The L-60 was improved and developed further by Hungary, creating the Toldi light tanks, which the Hungarians used extensively during World War II. With its 20 mm gun, the L-60 was roughly comparable to the German Panzer II or Soviet T-60. The L-60 was also the chassis on which the Landsverk L-62 self-propelled 40 mm anti-aircraft gun was built. Hungary bought L-62s and improved them, developing it into the 40M Nimród. Although the L-62 was designed as a self-propelled anti-aircraft gun (SPAAG), the Hungarian 40M Nimród saw service with Hungarian forces on the Eastern Front as both a tank destroyer and an SPAAG. Six L-62s were used by Finland after 1942.

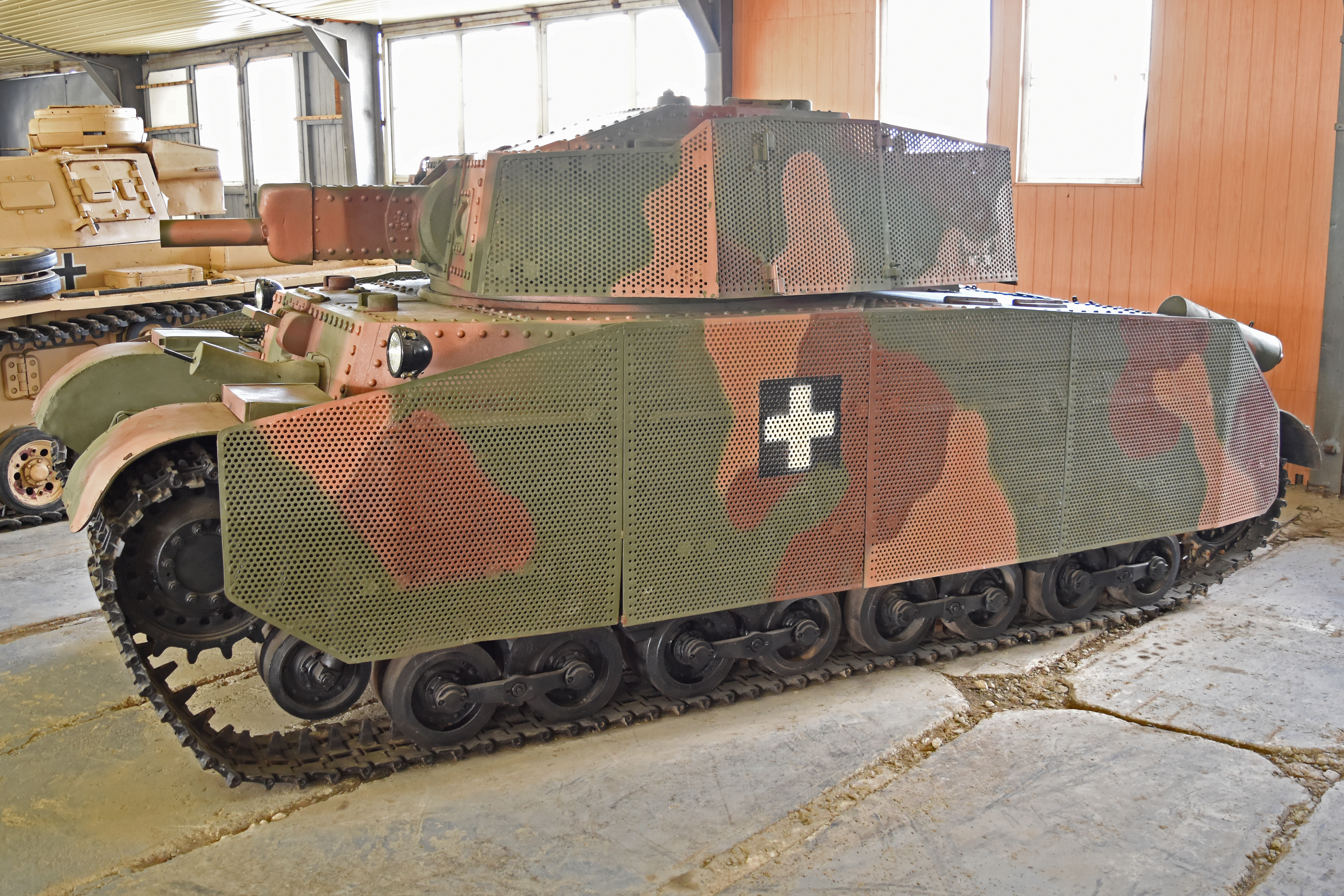
A Hungarian 41M Turán II medium tank in Kubinka Tank Museum

Hungary developed an impressive tank industry for its size before and during World War II. They built the well-armed Straussler V-4 tank during the interwar period, produced several variants of Toldi light tanks, as well as the Turán family of medium tanks, and later in the war they became the first smaller nation to make their own heavy tank – the 44M Tas. The 44M Tas was armed with a powerful 80 mm gun and had thick sloped armour, giving the Tas even better protection than the German Panther tank, which the 44M Tas was inspired by. Of the Turán series, the 40M Turán I was based on an incomplete prototype of the Czech Škoda T-21 (Š-II-c) medium tank, but the Turán I had improved armour, a redesigned turret and hull, and a new 40 mm gun. The later 41M Turán II had a short 75 mm gun, improved armour, and a redesigned turret. The pinnacle of the Turán series was the 43M Turán III, which had a long 75 mm gun, even thicker armour, and had a redesigned turret again. During World War II, these Hungarian tanks were supplemented by several dozen imported German vehicles, including the legendary Tigers and Panthers.

Turkey imported Soviet T-26 and a few T-28 tanks but did not begin series production of any tank.

Estonia, Latvia and Lithuania imported a few light vehicles such as the Fiat 3000, Vickers-Carden-Loyd tankette, Renault FTs, and Vickers Carden-Loyd M1936s.

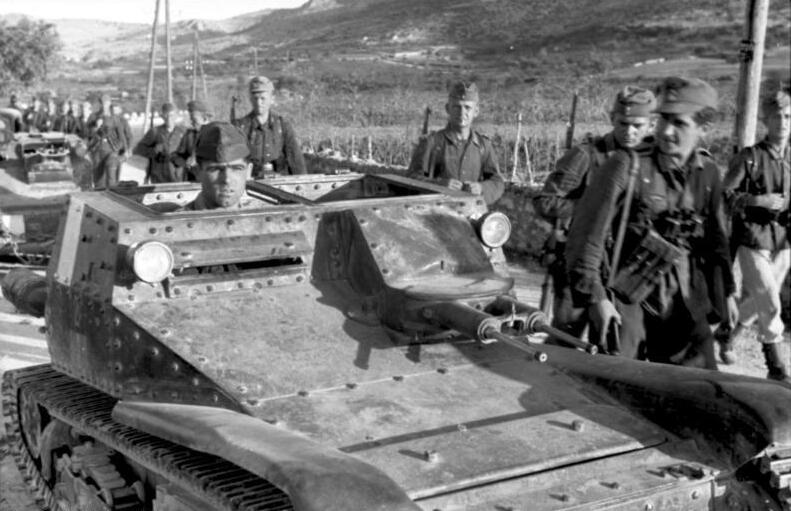
Close-up of Italian CV-35-L3/35 in the Balkans.

Romania imported some R-35 light tanks from France, as well as some German/Czech Panzer 35(t)s.

In Latin America, the first war where the tank was employed was the Chaco War between Bolivia and Paraguay, in which the former used a small number of British-built tanks and tankettes, whereas the latter had no tanks at all.

== See also ==
- History of the tank
- Tanks in World War I
- Comparison of World War I tanks
- Light tanks of the United Kingdom
- Tanks in World War II
- Cold War Tanks
- Post-Cold War Tanks
- Cultivator No. 6
