= ARL Tracteur C =

French cancelled super-heavy tank project

ARL "tracteur" C
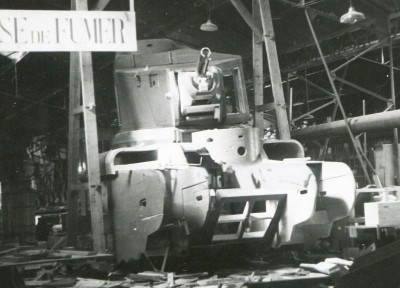
- Type: Super-heavy tank
- Place of origin: French Third Republic

Specifications
- Mass: 145 metric tons
- Length: 12 m (39 ft 4 in)
- Width: 3.20 m (10 ft 6 in)
- Height: 3.60 m (11 ft 10 in)
- Crew: 8
- Armour: 120 mm
- Main armament: 90 mm gun
- Secondary armament: 47 mm SA 35 gun, 7.5 mm machine guns
- Engine: two 550 hp engines 1,100 hp total
- Power/weight: 7.58 hp/t
- Maximum speed: 25 km/h

The "ARL Tracteur C", or ARL Char C, was a French super-heavy tank design. It was developed during the late interwar period by the Atelier de Construction de Rueil (ARL) company. A full-scale wooden mock-up was partly produced, but the project was terminated in favor of the FCM F1, a direct competitor which proved to be superior. The vehicle was meant to be extremely heavy and for that time period, very heavily armored. The ARL C was intended to be very long to meet the requirement to cross trenches up to 7 meters wide. The tank was multi-turreted like the FCM F1; however, unlike the FCM F1, the ARL C had the main turret in front of the very long hull right behind the secondary turret, not at the back of vehicle. The development path of the ARL C was extremely complex, due to the existence of a number of parallel super-heavy tank projects with overlapping design goals, the specifications of which were regularly changed. For each project in turn, several companies submitted one or more competing proposals.

== Second World War ==
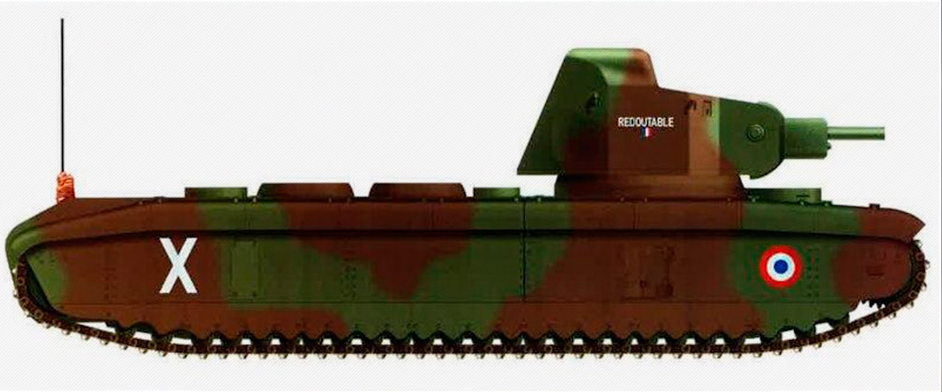
ARL tracteur C 1940. Note the very long hull.

In September 1938, the ARL company was granted a development contract for the char maximum, the first proposal for which was presented by ARL in May 1939. It had a proposed weight of 120 tons, consisted of two detachable modules, armor up to 120 mm thick and could be armed with either a gun or a flamethrower. The commission decided that only the gun-tank would be considered, however.

In 1940, the specifications of ARL's tank, now named as "Tracteur C" to keep the project secret from outsiders, were changed: the tank was designed to have two turrets, with a 47 mm gun in the front and a new larger turret with a 90 mm gun in the back. ARL on 17 January 1940 ordered four turrets from the Schneider company, but it agreed only to build two 105 mm gun turrets and refused the two 90 mm gun turrets, as there was simply no capacity to manufacture them. In April 1940, after AMX's AMX Tracteur C programme was terminated, the subcommission advised to go ahead with both the FCM F1 and the ARL prototypes, and immediately place an order for ten or fifteen of the former. That advice was given to a new overarching Commission of Tank Study, to which ARL presented a wooden mock-up on 11 April 1940; FCM presented one the next day. It transpired that the FCM project was far more advanced and could show the new tank in every detail. Due to this, ARL's project was terminated. Only the partially finished full-scale wooden mockup was produced.

After the Fall of France, in July 1940, the wooden mockup was captured by German forces. However, as the French super-heavy tank designs were unnecessary for the Wehrmacht, the mockup was soon dismantled and design documentation was apparently destroyed.

== Sources ==
- "1940 CHAR ARL TRACTEUR C". chars-francais.net (in French). Archived from the original on 15 January 2016.
- "ARL Tracteur C". aviarmor.net (in Russian). Archived from the original on 31 May 2017.
