= AMX Tracteur C =

French super-heavy tank project

- Type: Super-heavy tank
- Place of origin: French Third Republic

Production history
- Designer: Ateliers de construction d'Issy-les-Moulineaux
- Designed: 1939-1940
- Variants: 1

Specifications
- Mass: 140.0 t (308,600 lb)
- Length: 1st prototype: 9.375 m (30 ft 9.1 in); 2nd prototype: 10.0 m (32 ft 10 in)
- Width: 3.00 m (9 ft 10 in)
- Height: 3.26 m (10 ft 8 in)
- Crew: 6 (commander, gunner, driver, rear driver, loader, radio operator)
- Armor: 100mm hull
- Main armament: 1st prototype: 1x 105mm Canon de 105 mle 1913 Schneider 2nd prototype: 1x 90mm gun
- Secondary armament: 1x 47mm SA 35; 4x 7.5mm machine guns
- Engine: 2 engines
- Transmission: electrical transmission
- Fuel capacity: 1200 liters

The AMX Tracteur C was a super-heavy tank designed by Ateliers de construction d'Issy-les-Moulineaux(AMX).

== History ==
In 1939, the French Army initiated a project for a “Fortress Tank” with large calibre gun intended to break through the Siegfried Line of Germany. AMX and Forges et Chantiers de la Méditerranée(FCM) company took part in this project. The AMX company designed the AMX Tracteur C while the FCM company designed the FCM F1. The name “Tracteur C” was used to conceal the true purpose of the project.

== First prototype ==
The AMX Tracteur C has a very long hull and two turrets. The bigger turret is located at the front of the tank and has a commander cupola on top. It is mounted with the 105mm Canon de 105 mle 1913 Schneider. The smaller turret is located at the rear and is equipped with the 47mm SA 35. A pair of machine guns is located at the side of the hull at the front and the rear.

The suspension of the AMX Tracteur C is similar to the Char B1. There are 24 roadwheels and 13 support rollers on each side. The tank is to be powered by 2 engines that were not specified. The tank can hold 1200 liters of fuel. The transmission is electrical.

The AMX Tracteur C design was presented to the French Army but was rejected by them in favour of the FCM F1. However, the AMX company was not disheartened and continued to work on an improved version of the AMX Tracteur C.

== Second prototype ==
The second prototype of the AMX Tracteur C was designed in January 1940. The new project had a new arrangement of the turrets.

The bigger turret was shifted to the center of the hull. The smaller turret was placed at the front and is shifted towards the right. A 90mm gun replaced the 105mm gun in the bigger turret. The vehicle still retained the 47mm SA 35 gun and the 4 machine guns.

The length of the tank increased to 10m due to the changes made. The roadwheels went up to 26. The tank was still propelled by 2 engines.

The second variant of the AMX Tracteur C was rejected by the French Army again.

== Development ==
The AMX Tracteur C never left the drawing board.
