= FCM F1 =

French super-heavy tank project

- FCM F1
- Type: Super-heavy tank
- Place of origin: French Third Republic

Specifications
- Mass: 139 metric tons
- Length: 10.53 m
- Width: 3.10 m
- Height: 4.21 m
- Crew: 9
- Armour: 100 mm
- Main armament: 90 mm DCA gun
- Secondary armament: 47mm SA 37 gun and six machine guns; anti-aircraft twin 20mm Bofors
- Engine: two Renault V12 KGM of 550 hp 1100 hp total
- Power/weight: 7.9 hp/t
- Suspension: vertical coil springs
- Operational range: 200 km
- Maximum speed: 20 km/h

The FCM F1 was a French super-heavy tank developed during the late Interbellum by the Forges et Chantiers de la Méditerranée (FCM) company. Twelve were ordered in 1940 to replace the Char 2C, but France was defeated before construction could begin, a wooden mock-up being all that was finished. The FCM F1 was large and elongated, and had two turrets: one in front and one in the back, with a single high-velocity gun in each turret. The rear turret was superfiring, meaning it was raised higher and fired over the top of the forward one, a common practice in warships. The vehicle was intended to be heavily armoured. Its size and protection level made it by 1940, at about 140 tons, the heaviest tank ever to have actually been ordered for production. Despite two engines its speed would have been low. The primary purpose of the tank was to breach German fortification lines, not to fight enemy tanks. The development path of the FCM F1 was extremely complex, due to the existence of a number of parallel super-heavy tank projects with overlapping design goals, the specifications of which were regularly changed. For each project in turn several companies submitted one or more competing proposals.

== The char lourd ==
During the 1920s, France used a typology of tanks, classified according to weight. The heaviest class was formed by the char lourd, or "heavy tank". In the programmes of 1921 and 1930, no new tank was foreseen for this class, the Char 2C fulfilling the role of char lourd. The programme of 1926 led on 28 March 1928 to a char d'arrêt project of fifty tons, named after the fort d'arrêt, a solitary fort able to block enemy advance. As specified on 13 July 1928, it was to be armed with two high-velocity 75 mm guns in a single turret and protected by either 100 mm armour at three sides or by 150 mm armour at the front, the side armour being reduced to about 60 to 70 mm. The speed should be about five to six km/h in rough terrain, the suspension being unsprung. When conceptual studies by FCM had reached 100 tonnes, it was feared such a heavy vehicle would have insurmountable steering problems. By the end of July an articulated tank was foreseen, with a separate tracked motor and double gun module, each weighing about seventy to eighty tonnes and featuring 100 mm armour. In view of the novelty of such a construction, a more conventional alternative was studied in parallel, of a sixty-five tonne tank with a single 75 mm gun and protected by 120 mm armour. In February 1929 a choice had been made for the alternative design and adjusted specifications were formulated. On 20 April 1929 it was announced that no budget would be made available for constructing this type and on 17 May 1929 the study was terminated.

In June 1929, the STCC (Section Techniques des Chars de Combat) began another heavy tank study, proposing a faster design with a Johnson track, an engine of 500 hp, a speed of 12 km/h, 65 tonne weight, a turreted 120 mm gun and 50 mm front protection. In January 1930, this was changed into a project for a 70 tonne tank, with a high-velocity 75 mm gun, 40 mm all-round protection and a great length of 9.35 metres. The design was soon discontinued and for many years no French super-heavy tank development took place.

On 4 May 1936 however, the Conseil Consulatif de l'Armement under General Julien Claude Marie Sosthène Dufieux decided to develop a new heavy tank, with the following specifications given on 12 November 1936: a maximum weight of 45 metric tons, immunity to 75 mm AP fire over a distance of 200 metres, a speed of 30 km/h, a range of 200 kilometres, and an armament consisting of a long 75 mm gun in the hull and a 47 mm gun in a turret. It would thus have resembled an oversized Char B1, of which tank several other development projects were ongoing.

In 1937 three manufacturers, AMX, ARL and FCM, presented prototype proposals; ARL even presented three of them simultaneously. All of these however, even in this early stage of development had a higher projected weight than 45 tons — and threatened to become even heavier during actual construction. In reaction, the Conseil Supérieur de la Guerre initially decided on 26 March 1937 to build a very small and cheap but heavily armoured (60 mm) vehicle instead, on the lines of the British Matilda I. The first designs featured a 37 mm gun. When a better armament was demanded, it was understood through a study by the Section de l'Armement et des Études Techniques (SAET) on 5 April 1937 that the tank would still weigh about twenty tons, while another tank, the Char G1, was already in development in this weight class.

As a result, in February 1938 the specifications were again radically changed, and now called for a superheavy tank with a 75 mm gun in a turret; no weight limits were imposed. Of all projects, the new specifications were most similar to the original FCM proposal of sixty tons and so the French Supreme Command decided on 6 April 1938 to grant FCM a development contract for what was now called the Char F1. It was nonetheless realised that this project could be no more than an intermediate step in heavy tank design; already, also in February, a special commission had been formed, headed by the inspector-general of tanks, Julien François René Martin, to further study the problem of overcoming the new defences of the Westwall (often incorrectly called the "Siegfried Line") being constructed at the time on the western German border.

== The char d'attaque des fortifications ==
The commission immediately revived the char lourd concept but applied it only to the "45 ton tank" project and differentiated this from a tank optimised for destroying modern fortifications, a char d'attaque des fortifications. This latter vehicle should have a powerful high velocity gun in a turret but be itself immune to enemy antitank-guns. Speed was considered of secondary importance and might be as low as 10 km/h maximum. However trench-crossing and wading abilities would have to be excellent. If this should result in an overly cumbersome vehicle, it should be made modular so that the components could be transported separately. On 4 May 1938 the Direction des Fabrications d’Armement proposed to call this the Char H project, to distinguish it from the Char F, but this was rejected as there was some danger of confusion with the Hotchkiss H35.

The French High Command approved the commission's plans in April 1938 and then appointed a second commission to work them out in detail. This new commission was also charged with considering the question of whether a 45-ton vehicle might not after all be sufficient. In its first meeting, on 9 May 1938, the commission quickly came to the conclusion that to meet the tactical demands a 75 mm gun in a turret and 120 mm allround armour was necessary; this could not be reconciled with a weight of 45 tons. On the other hand, a design to equal the climbing and crossing mobility of even the old Char 2C would likely result in a 150–200–ton behemoth, of which even the components of a modular design would be impractical to transport. It was therefore decided to further research the possibility of a 65-ton vehicle, with an empty hull weight of 45 tons.

In its second meeting on 22 July 1938, some troubling data were considered. Most bridges could carry a maximum single vehicle load of 35 tons, so the new tank would have to cross rivers on special pontoons. German tank moats were discovered to have a design width of about seven metres, so a very long vehicle seemed to be necessary. Existing rail road cars could carry a maximum of 100 tons though. It was also pointed out that 120 mm armour might not be enough in view of the powerful German 88 mm gun. The commission rejected the char minimum proposal of 56 tons as it had insufficient trench-crossing capacity. It also discarded a proposal by the engineer Boirault to build a futuristic 120 ton articulated tank. It retained two options: the char maximum of 89 tons, demountable in two sections, and the char squelette of 110 tons and with a trench-crossing ability of eight metres; this latter design was along the general lines of the World War I American Skeleton Tank, but with the added feature that the main body could move in relation to the skeleton track frame in order to shift its point of gravity.

In September 1938 the Supreme Command ordered immediate research programmes by the French industry of both possibilities. The ARL company was granted a development contract for the char maximum, the first proposal for which was presented by ARL in May 1939. It had a proposed weight of 120 tons, consisted of two detachable modules and could be armed with either a gun or a flamethrower. The commission decided that only the gun tank would be considered, but that a second turret at the rear was needed for defence against infantry assault. It also remarked that the project was quite similar to that of the Char F1 and that perhaps both programmes should be merged.

== Second World War ==
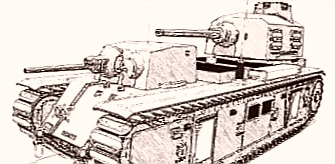
FCM F1

=== September 1939 Programme ===
When the Second World War broke out in September 1939 some hurried measures were taken to have an operational heavy tank ready for the planned offensive against Germany in 1941, even though the French High Command did not have great faith in the super-heavy tank project and intended to circumvent the Westwall by violating the neutrality of the Low Countries, should these refuse to join the Entente in time. The skeleton tank, being too futuristic, was abandoned. Despite the hurry, the lack of real progress made did not allow for a concentration of all effort into a single design, as it was still unclear whether a working prototype could be provided in time. Three companies, FCM, ARL and AMX, were therefore in October ordered to construct two different prototypes each, for a total of six models. These should fit existing railway wagons, which the F1 did not. The flamethrower option should be abandoned.

On 22 December 1939 more precise specifications were made. FCM should complete the F1 with a 75 mm gun but also build a F1 hull with a 90 or 105 mm gun in the superstructure, because the 75 mm gun was likely too weak. As the Char F1 was designed with 100 mm armour, this should be enhanced on the front to 120 mm. A secondary turret with a 47 mm gun should protect the back. Both AMX and ARL should build prototypes with 105 and 90 mm guns in a turret — the turrets themselves being independently designed, as usual for French tanks — and a secondary turret with a 47 mm gun. That month both FCM and ARL indicated that they expected to begin construction of the prototypes in the summer of 1940 and series production at the end of 1941; for AMX it was too soon to make any precise predictions. ARL on 17 January 1940 ordered four turrets from the Schneider company, but it agreed only to build two 105 mm gun turrets and refused the two 90 mm gun turrets, as there was simply no capacity to manufacture them.

In February 1940 the Société d’Études et d’Application Mécanique (SEAM) proposed a tank designed by the Polish engineer Prince André Poniatowski. It was a truly gigantic vehicle, weighing 220 tons, to be moved by two Hispano engines of 925 hp each, via a petro-electrical transmission. The project tried to recommend itself by pointing out that the hull was over five meters wide while being only twelve metres long and thus had a superior length-width ratio, facilitating steering. For transport the vehicle could be split in two sides along its entire length. Unsurprisingly, on 20 April 1940 it was refused by the Ministry of Defence.

On 4 March 1940 a new subcommission to supervise the heavy tank design learned that the 90 and 105 mm gun turret designs were ready, i.e. on paper. It decided to abandon the AMX projects as they were hopelessly behind schedule; its Tracteur C could not be ready before July 1941. AMX terminated development on 1 April. The subcommission advised to go ahead with both the FCM F1 and the ARL tracteur C prototypes and immediately place an order for ten or fifteen of the former. That advice was given to a new overarching Commission of Tank Study, to which ARL presented a wooden mock-up on 11 April 1940; FCM presented one the next day. It transpired that the FCM project was far more advanced and could show the new tank in every detail. The design had a sloped armour front plate, a small turret in front, instead of behind as specified, and a higher turret at the back, able to hold a 90 mm gun instead of the specified 75 mm gun. The tank had a projected weight of 140 metric tons, to be moved at 24 km/h by two 550 hp Renault engines via an electrical transmission. The Commission decided to abandon the ARL projects and make a preliminary order for twelve FCM F1s, to be delivered from May 1941 onward at three or four tanks a month. This expectation to have some tanks ready for the summer of 1941 was a very important consideration, as the entire heavy tank project faced strong opposition from those who saw it as a waste of scarce resources, better spent on building more Char B1s. The Commission also asked FCM to bring the armour protection to 120 mm all-round, though this would increase weight to 145 tons and reduce maximum speed to 20 km/h. For the commission this was a departure from its earlier decisions about a future char de forteresse.

=== The char de forteresse ===
On 28 February 1940 a new commission for the study of tank design was established, the Commission d'Études des Chars, to create a coherent policy for future French tank production. The commission planned for three weight classes, the heaviest of which was the char de forteresse. This tank was envisaged as a sort of "super Char B" with a 135 or 155 mm howitzer in the hull and a 75 or 90 mm gun in the turret. Its armour should be 100 or 120 mm all-round. Nevertheless, its weight was very optimistically expected to be around 80-100 tons, powered by a 1000 hp engine. On 14 May it was decided that, there being no suitable 135 or 155 mm gun available, the project would be dropped.

== Aftermath ==
After the Fall of France all official design on heavy/super-heavy tanks was halted. The Char F1 showed quite a few similarities though to the ARL 44, produced just after the war. In 1944 the Allies had developed some new vehicles with exactly the same purpose as the FCM F1: to breach the "Siegfried Line". The British had the Tortoise heavy assault tank, the Americans the super-heavy tank T28. Both designs were self-propelled guns however, not multi-turreted tanks, allowing them to be lighter and still better protected. Like the FCM F1 they would not be placed into production.

== See also ==
- ARL Tracteur C - another super-heavy tank, by ARL, a design that competed with FCM F1 and shared many similarities.
- Tanks in France

== Literature ==
- Pierre Touzin, Les véhicules blindés français, 1900-1944. EPA, 1979
- Jean-Gabriel Jeudy, Chars de France, E.T.A.I., 1997
- Paul Malmassari, 2004, "Les projets de chars de forteresse français 1921-1940", La Revue historique des armées, n° 234, 1er trimestre 2004, pp. 11–24
