= Skeleton tank =

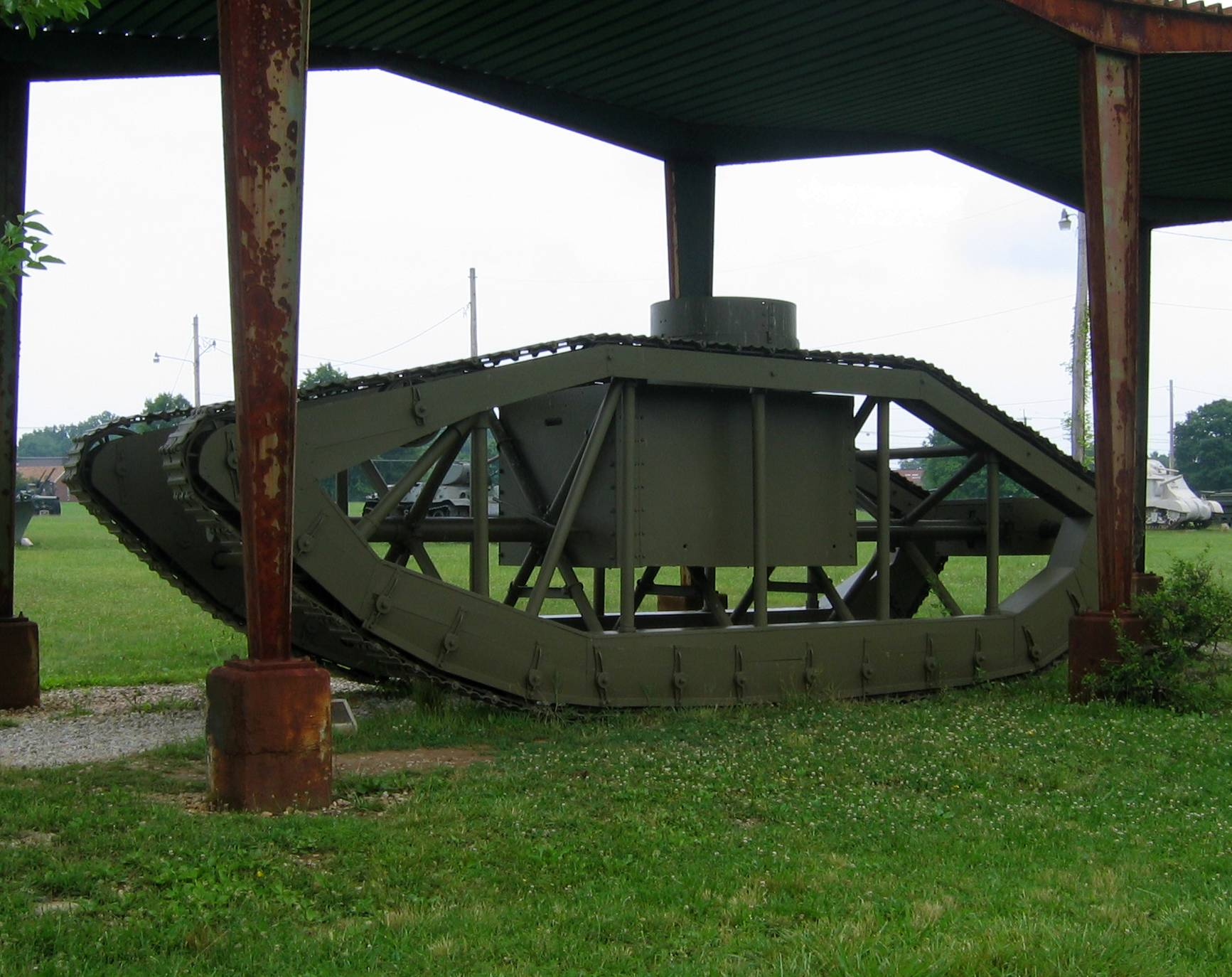
- Skeleton Tank preserved at Aberdeen Proving Ground
- Type: Experimental Tank
- Place of origin: USA

Production history
- Manufacturer: Pioneer Tractor Company
- Produced: 1918
- No. built: 1

Specifications
- Mass: 18,000 lb (8,200 kg)
- Length: 25 ft (7.6 m)
- Width: 8 ft 5 in (2.57 m)
- Height: 9 ft 6 in (2.90 m)
- Crew: 2
- Armor: 0.5 in (12.7 mm)
- Main armament: 1 X .30 (7.62 mm) caliber machine gun
- Engine: 2 X Beaver 4-cylinder 50 hp (37 kW)
- Suspension: Rigid frame tracks
- Maximum speed: 5 mph (8.0 km/h)

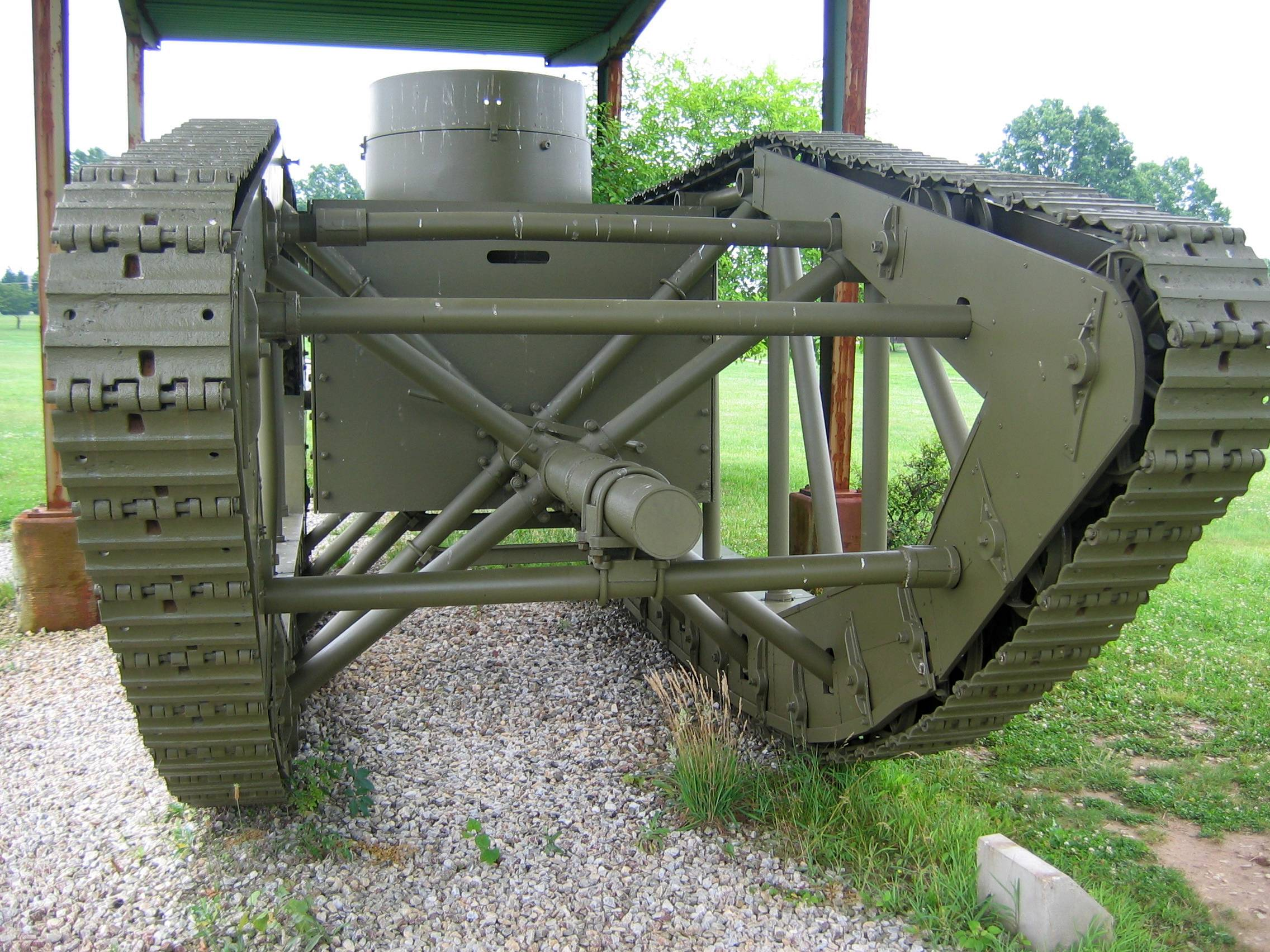
Bow of Skeleton Tank. Note boxy fighting compartment and machine gun turret.

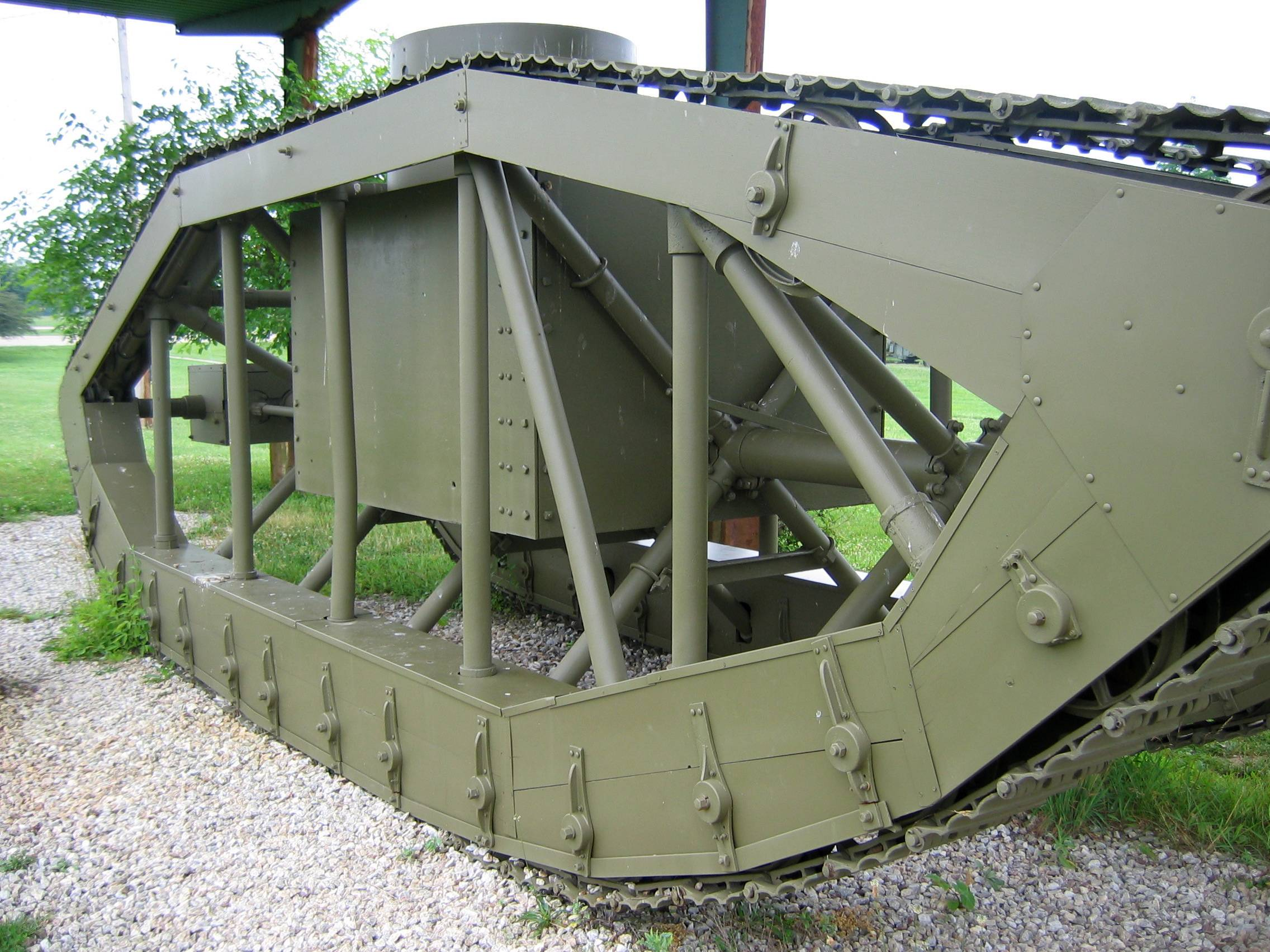
Right side of Skeleton Tank showing use of iron pipes and plumbing connections to create lozenge or rhomboid shape for trench-crossing.

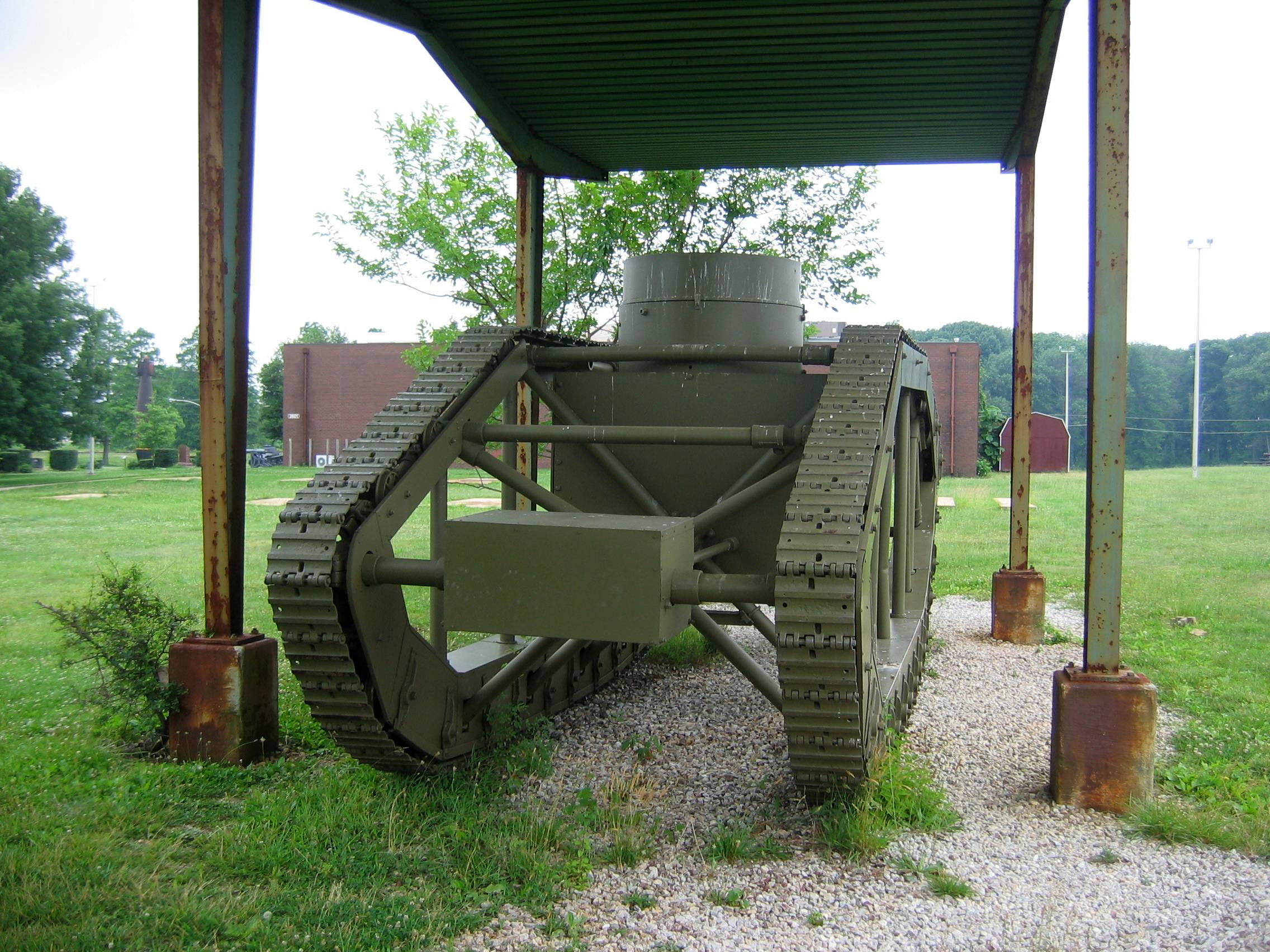
Rear of Skeleton Tank showing gearbox.

The Skeleton tank also known as the Spider tank was an experimental prototype tank built in 1918 by the Pioneer Tractor Company, Winona, Minnesota for $15,000 ($ 321,100 in 2025). The prototype was ready for trials by October 1918. Designed with several innovative features, some of which were controversial at the time, the Skeleton Tank project did not proceed beyond the single prototype.

== Design ==
The objective of this prototype was to develop a lightweight vehicle capable of crossing wide trenches in a manner similar to the then-conventional heavy British tanks. Unlike the British tanks with their fully enclosed chassis, the Skeleton Tank achieved the requisite lozenge shape by supporting its tracks with a skeleton-like framework formed from ordinary iron pipes joined by standard plumbing connections. Suspended between these track frames was an armored fighting compartment carrying a machine gun turret. The engines were also housed in this armor-protected box.

This arrangement dramatically reduced the weight of the vehicle as compared to the larger British and French tanks while preserving the trench-crossing capabilities of those machines, and there was a belief that most enemy bullets and cannon rounds would pass harmlessly through the structure. However, it eliminated the possibility of mounting weapons in sponsons as in the British tanks and thus limited the armament that could be carried.

Motive power consisted of two Beaver 50 hp (37 kW) four-cylinder engines with a final drive joining to a gearbox suspended between the rear horns of the tracks. This allowed a maximum speed of 5 mph (8.0 km/h).

== Specifications ==
The Skeleton Tank weighed 9 tons and carried a boxy fighting compartment protected by a 1/2 inch (13 millimetres) of armor, which was in line with the armor thicknesses on other Allied tanks.

The crew of two consisted of the driver and the commander/gunner who manned the .30 (7.62 mm) caliber machine gun in the turret.

It was 25 feet (7.6 m) long, which compared favorably in trench-crossing potential to the then-standard heavy British Mk IV and Mk V tanks with lengths of 26 ft 5 in (8.05 m) but weights of 28 to 29 tons, and the French Schneider CA1 and Char d'Assault St. Chamond with lengths of 19 ft 9 in (6.02 m) and 28 ft 11 in (8.81 m) and weights of 13.5 and 23 tons respectively.

It was 8 ft 5 in (2.57 m) wide, narrower than the 10 ft (3.0 m) to 12 ft 5 in (3.78 m) of the British tanks, and slightly higher at 9 ft 6 in (2.90 m) vice 8 ft 8 in (2.64 m) for the Mk IV/V due to its turret.

It was never ordered into production.

== Survivor ==
The cosmetically restored Skeleton Tank is preserved under a canopy at the United States Army Ordnance Museum at Fort Lee, Virginia.

== Bibliography ==
Notes

References

- Chamberlain, Peter; Ellis, Chris (1972) [1974]. Pictorial history of Tanks of the World 1915-1945. Galahad Books. p. 167. ISBN 0-88365-183-1.
- Moore, Craig (2017). Tank Hunter: World War One. The History Press. ISBN 9780750986595. - Total pages: 240
- Zaloga, Steven J. (2017). Early US Armor: Tanks 1916–40. Bloomsbury Publishing. ISBN 9781472818089. - Total pages: 48
