= Ministry of Armaments =

Ministry of Armaments or Ministry of Munitions may refer to:

- Reich Ministry of Armaments and War Production (Nazi Germany)
- Minister of Munitions (Britain)
- Department of Munitions and Supply (Canada)
- Ministry of Munitions (Japan)
- Minister of Armaments (France)
- Ministry of Armaments of the USSR

== See also ==
- Department of Munitions, Australian WWII department headed by the Minister for Munitions
