= Undersecretary =

Junior minister or senior official

Undersecretary (or under secretary) is a title for a person who works for and has a lower rank than a secretary (person in charge). It is used in the executive branch of government, with different meanings in different political systems, and is also used in other organizational settings.

In government, the position may be a junior government minister (e.g. a parliamentary secretary) who assists a secretary of state. In other cases, the position may be a senior government official, frequently a career public servant, who typically acts as a senior administrator. The senior administrator may be considered a second-in-command to a politically appointed cabinet minister or other government official (e.g. in the United States), or they may be considered a head or chief executive of a government department (e.g. a permanent secretary). Some systems of government have both types of position, as in the United Kingdom where the title has been in use since the 17th century.

== France ==
In France the Undersecretary of State (sous-secrétaire d'État) was a governmental role created during the Hundred Days and institutionalized in 1816. It served as an administrative and, later, political assistant to ministers, evolving significantly across the country's political regimes until being replaced by the title of Secretary of State under the Fifth Republic.

== Holy See ==
In the Holy See, undersecretary is a title given to senior administrative officials working in the dicasteries of the Roman Curia.

== Hong Kong ==
In Hong Kong, undersecretary is a position created in 2008 to work closely with bureau secretaries and top civil servants to implement the Chief Executive's policy blueprint and agenda in an executive-led government. The appointment of undersecretaries and political assistants is an extension of the Principal Officials Accountability System into today's Political Appointments System.

== India ==
In India, undersecretary is an officer level secretariat post in central ministries, tenanted by officers of various civil services, usually promoted officers from the Group 'B' (section officers) of the Central Secretariat Service, or the newly appointed officers of the Indian Administrative Service and the Indian Foreign Service, or other Group 'A' services on deputation in the central government in early stages of their careers with a minimum of 7–8 years of service.

Under secretary is also an officer level secretarial post in state government secretariats.

Officers in this capacity further manage desk or section officers within a ministry or central regulatory body. Undersecretaries occupy gazetted civil service posts in India, unlike in some Western democracies, where they are political appointees. An undersecretary will typically report to a deputy secretary, or a director to the Government of India.

== Italy ==
In Italy, Undersecretary is a second-in-command to a politically appointed Minister. In particular, he/she is appointed with a President of the Republic Decree, on proposal of the Prime Minister, who previously agreed such proposal with the relevant Minister.

== Netherlands ==
In the Netherlands, a state secretary (Dutch: staatssecretaris) is the title of a junior member of the Cabinet of the Netherlands. They take over part of the portfolio of a certain minister and fall under the responsibility of that minister, but are at the same time also separately responsible to the States General of the Netherlands. They do not attend the weekly Council of Ministers unless specifically invited. Some are allowed to use the title "minister" in meetings with foreign colleagues who are responsible for the same topic area (who may be ministers).

== Poland ==
(State Secretary (Poland)) In Poland, the ministries are staffed by secretaries of state and undersecretaries of state, commonly referred to as deputy ministers. Their task is to assist the Minister and replace him if necessary.

== Portugal ==
In Portugal the level of undersecretary is not a pro-forma echelon in the executive hierarchy. Such posts are created on an ad hoc basis as required. It is the lowest rung in the executive power. There is currently only one undersecretary of State in the present government.

== Spain ==
In the Spanish Government, an Under-Secretary is a senior civil servant charged with running a government department on a day-to-day basis. Thus, the under-secretaries reports directly to the competent minister and they are appointed by the Monarch on the advice of the Council of Ministers. The position has existed since the early 19th century, being second-in-command to the minister, although since the 1970s it has been displaced by secretaries of state.

The position is equivalent to the British Permanent Under-Secretary of State.

== United Kingdom ==
The title of Under-Secretary is used in two different contexts in the British political system. A Parliamentary Under-Secretary of State is a junior member of the government, always an MP or a peer from the governing party, who is appointed to assist a Secretary of State or other government minister. They rank between a Minister of State and a Parliamentary Private Secretary; the rank is usually seen as a stepping-stone to higher political office. The title originated in the 17th century. The title secretary of state in the government of England has also been in use since the early 17th century.

In contrast, a Permanent Under-Secretary of State is the full title of a Permanent Secretary, a senior civil servant employed to head a government department and oversee the implementation of policy.

== United States ==
In the United States executive branch, an undersecretary is a senior official in a government department, junior to a departmental Secretary such as the Secretary of State and usually junior to a Deputy Secretary as well. An Undersecretary is typically a political appointee. They may head specific sub-departments or agencies such as the Defense Intelligence Agency, or be responsible for a specific area of policy within the department, e.g. the Undersecretary for Management within the Department of State. Before 1972, "Undersecretary" (also spelled "Under Secretary") signified the senior deputy to a cabinet Secretary, especially of State and Treasury. The office of Under Secretary of State was replaced by the Deputy Secretary of State and the office of Under Secretary of the Treasury was replaced by the Deputy Secretary of the Treasury.

== See also ==
- Secretary (title)
- Parliamentary secretary – a junior minister who may be titled undersecretary
- Permanent secretary – a senior civil servant who may be titled undersecretary
