= Char 2C =

French super-heavy tank

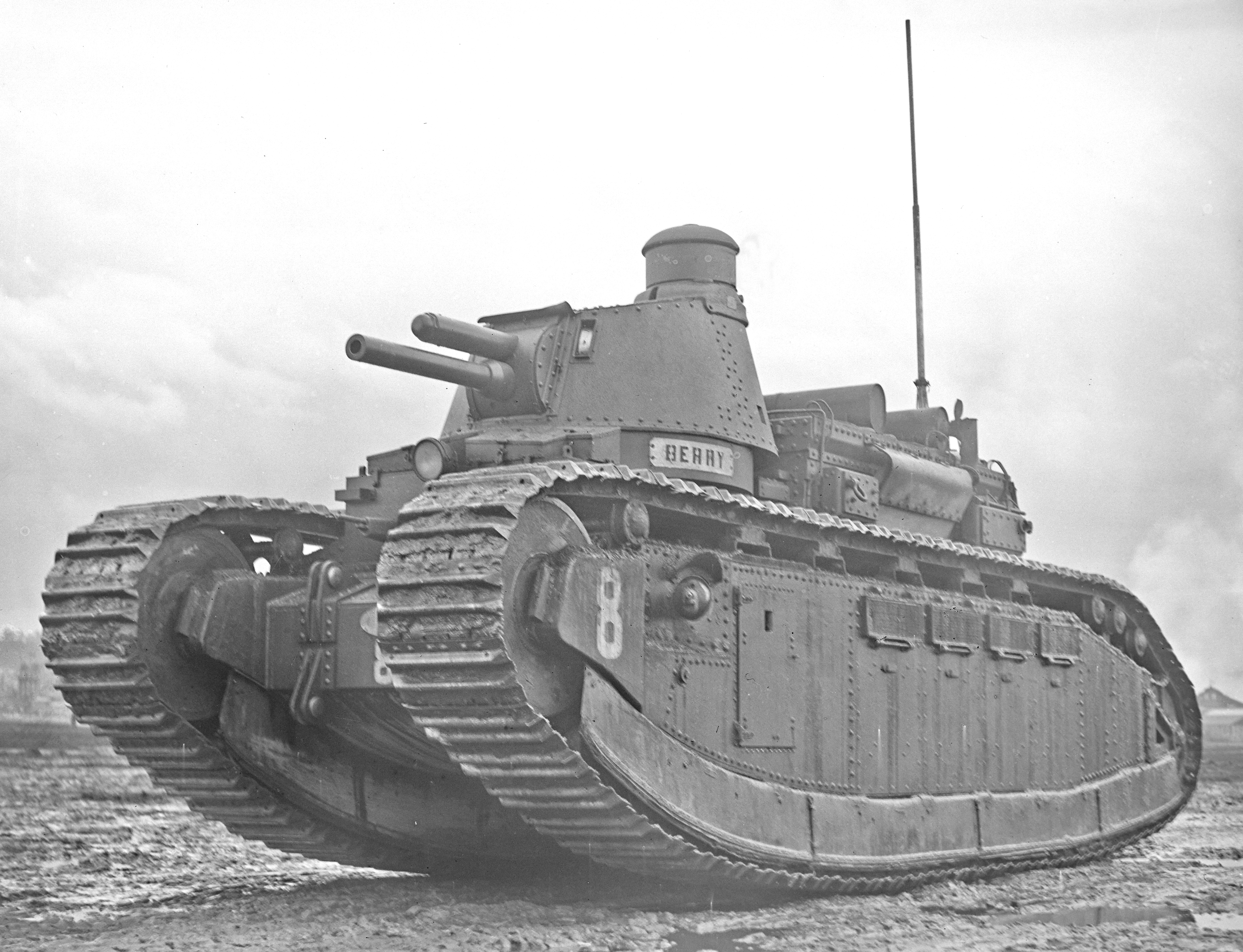
- Char 2C "Berry", 1928
- Type: heavy/super-heavy landship
- Place of origin: French Third Republic

Service history
- In service: 1921–1940
- Used by: French Third Republic
- Wars: World War II

Production history
- Designed: 1917
- Manufacturer: Forges et Chantiers de la Méditerranée
- Produced: 1921
- No. built: 10
- Variants: Char 2C bis, char 2C Lorraine

Specifications
- Mass: 69 tonnes (68 long tons; 76 short tons)
- Length: 10.27 m (33 ft 8 in)
- Width: 3 m (9 ft 10 in)
- Height: 4.09 m (13 ft 5 in)
- Crew: 12
- Armour: 45 mm (1.8 in) max.
- Main armament: 75 mm Canon de 75 modèle 1897
- Secondary armament: Four 8 mm Hotchkiss Mle 1914 machine guns (three in gimbal ball mounts at front and both sides forward, one mounted in a rear turret)
- Engine: Two engines 2 x 250 CV (180 kW)
- Suspension: leaf springs
- Operational range: 150 km (93 mi)
- Maximum speed: 15 km/h (9.3 mph)

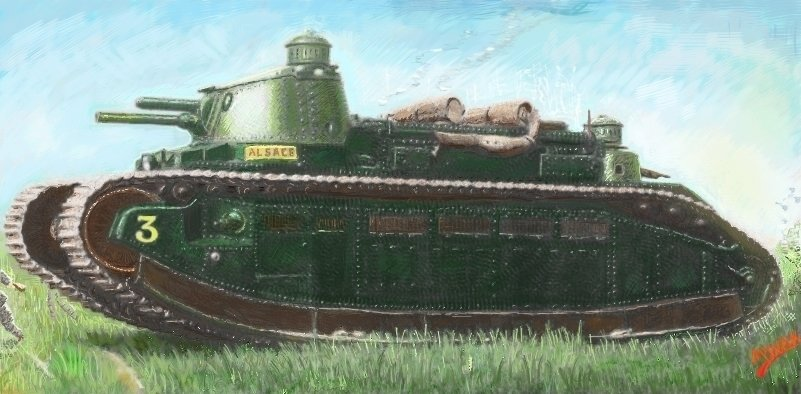
Painting of char 2C Alsace

The Char 2C, also known as the FCM 2C, was a French post WWI heavy tank landship, later considered a super-heavy tank. It was developed during World War I but not deployed until after the war. It was, in total volume or physical dimensions, the largest operational tank ever made.

Ten tanks were built in 1921. Although remaining operational, their value at the start of World War II was largely propagandistic. After Germany broke through French defences in June 1940, they were sent away from the front to preserve them. They were unable to reach safety and were deliberately destroyed to prevent capture.

== Development ==
=== The char d'assaut de grand modèle ===
The origins of the Char 2C have always been shrouded in a certain mystery. In the summer of 1916, likely in July, General Léon Augustin Jean Marie Mourret, the Subsecretary of Artillery, verbally granted Forges et Chantiers de la Méditerranée (FCM), a shipyard in the south of France near Toulon, the contract for the development of a heavy tank, a char d'assaut de grand modèle. At the time, French industry was very active in lobbying for defence orders, using their connections with high-placed officials and officers to obtain commissions; development contracts could be very profitable even when not resulting in actual production, as they were fully paid for by the state. The French Army had no stated requirement for a heavy tank, and there was no official policy to procure one. Hence, the decision seemed to have been taken solely on his personal authority. The reason he later gave was that the British tanks then in development by a naval committee seemed to be better devised as regarded lay-out, ventilation and fire protection, so a shipyard might improve on existing French designs. Exact specifications, if they ever existed, have been lost. FCM then largely neglected the project, apart from reaping the financial benefits. At that time, all tank projects were highly secret, and thereby shielded from public scrutiny.

On 15 September 1916, the British introduced their Mark I (heavy) tank at the Battle of the Somme, The public mood in Britain had been growing ever darker as the overall failure of the Somme Offensive became known, tanks offered a new hope of final victory. The French public wanted to know about their own national tank projects (Note: The Saint-Chamond and Schneider CA1) and French politicians, up til then not having been greatly involved in them and leaving the matter to the military, were also interested. This sudden attention greatly alarmed Mourret, who promptly investigated the progress that had been made at FCM and was shocked to find there was none. On 30 September, he personally took control of the project. On 12 October, knowing that the Renault company had some months earlier made several proposals to build a heavy tracked mortar (which had been rejected), he begged Louis Renault to assist FCM in the development of a suitable heavy vehicle; this request Renault obliged. Even before knowing what the exact nature of the project would be, on 20 October, Mourret ordered one prototype to be built by FCM.

This development coincided with a political demand by Minister of Armaments Albert Thomas to produce a tank superior to the British types. On 7 October, he had asked the British prime minister David Lloyd George to deliver some Mark Is to France but had received no answer. Concluding, correctly, that no such deliveries would materialise, on 23 January 1917 he ordered that French tanks should be developed that were faster, and more powerfully armed and armoured than any British vehicle. He specified a weight of forty tonnes, immunity against light artillery rounds and a trench-crossing capability of 3.5 metres.

Meanwhile, Renault had consulted his own team, led by Rodolphe Ernst-Metzmaier, which since May 1916 had been in the process of designing the revolutionary Renault FT light tank. This work had not, however, stopped them from considering other tank types. Renault, always expecting his employees to provide new ideas instantly, had by this attitude encouraged the team to take a proactive stance – setting a pattern that would last until 1940 – and to have various kinds of contingency studies ready for the occasion, including a feasibility study for a heavy tank. This fortunate circumstance allowed a full-size wooden mockup to be constructed in a remarkably quick time. It was visited by the Undersecretary of State for Inventions for National Defense Jules-Louis Breton on 13 January 1917, who was much impressed and developed a keen interest in the project. The design was presented to the Consultative Committee of the Assault Artillery on 16 and 17 January 1917, after the basic concept had been approved on 30 December. This proposed tank was the most advanced design of its time; it was received very favourably, also because of the enthusiastic report by Breton, and a consensus began to form that the project was most promising and a potential "war-winner". It featured a 105 mm gun in a turret and had a proposed weight of 38 tons, as well as 35 mm armour. The committee decided to have two prototypes developed, one with an electrical transmission, the other with a hydraulic transmission. In this period, both the French and British military had become aware of severe mobility and steering problems with heavy tracked vehicles; the French designs paralleled extensive British experiments with all kinds of improved tank transmissions to solve them.

=== Resistance to the project ===
In January 1917, the Ministry of Armament proposed building three weight classes of tanks: light, medium, and heavy tanks, the latter class corresponding to the new project. However, brigadier Jean Baptiste Eugène Estienne, commander of the new tank force, the Assault Artillery, was closely cooperating with Renault in the development of the Renault FT, and by this was well informed of the other tank project. Estienne feared that production of heavy tanks would use all available production facilities, making procurement of the - much more practical - Renault FT light tank impossible. He was not averse to the production of heavy tanks but only in a limited number and provided it did not impede the manufacture of light tanks. In November Mourret argued that all available resources should be concentrated into heavy tank production and development of the Renault FT halted. Alarmed, Estienne wrote to the Commander-in-Chief, General Joseph Joffre, on 27 November 1916 defending the light tank concept. He admitted that "colossal landships" might in certain circumstances have their uses, but claimed that while it was as yet unproven that a workable heavy type could be developed, let alone produced in sufficient numbers by French industry, it would be folly not to give priority to light tanks that could be constructed without delay. He insisted that Joffre use all his influence to bring about the cancellation of the heavy tank project.

Joffre answered that Estienne was no doubt correct in his tactical and organisational analysis, but that political backing of the heavy tank was simply too strong. The Minister of Armament, Albert Thomas, had committed himself openly to Mourret's cause and did not dare to retract support now. Joffre advised Estienne that he would make sure that the Renault FT would not be cancelled, and since heavy tank development would take such a long time it would not - for the immediate future - get in the way of light tank production. There would surely be no harm in allowing some prototypes to be built.

The Consultative Committee of the Assault Artillery (Comité Consultatif de l'Artillerie d'Assaut, CCAS) had been created on 13 December 1916 and met for the first time on 17 December. During this first session it was reported that Renault and FCM were cooperating on a heavy tank project of thirty tonnes. Estienne on this occasion stressed that production should be "orientated towards small types and very large types". During the next meeting on 30 December, Estienne was surprised to discover that for no clear reasons a 105 mm gun was planned; he himself preferred a 75 mm gun. Estienne was absent on the crucial meeting of 17 January, but by letter informed the committee that he found the project satisfactory and agreed with the quick construction of two prototypes; he stated his preference for a 75 mm over a 105 mm gun.

In December, Joffre was replaced as supreme commander by Robert Nivelle. In late January Nivelle learned of the heavy tank project from Estienne. He was much more alarmed than Joffre had been. On 29 January, he wrote a letter to Thomas, making clear that under no circumstances could the project be allowed to impede production of the Schneider CA. Thomas answered on 5 February that there was no danger of this; anyway he had just happened to affirm on 1 February the policy of General Mourret, who had already ordered the simultaneous development of three prototypes: the lightened 30-tonne "A" version, 6.92 metres long, (Note: a suspension featuring twenty-nine double road wheels, four main bogies and five top rollers, powered by two Renault 200 metric horsepower [CV] (150 kW) engines) with a 75 mm gun, to fulfil the original order of 20 October; the 45-tonne "B" version with a longer hull (7.39 (Note: with a suspension featuring thirty road wheels, five main bogies and six top rollers, using a new 380 CV (280 kW) engine and a petro-hydraulic transmission) metres), armed with a 75 mm gun and two machine guns, and the 62-ton "C" version 9.31 meters long (Note: a suspension featuring forty-five road wheels, six main bogies and nine top rollers, and four engines of 110 CV (81 kW) combined with a petro-electrical transmission) with a 75 mm gun. Nivelle's misgivings were reinforced by inquiries from a parliamentary financial commission led by Pierre Renaudel. A plan by Breton to immediately order fifty vehicles more or less identical to the mock-up was therefore rejected. The 1 February order of two additional prototypes was confirmed by the CCAS on 7 February. Eventually, the "FCM 1A" would be developed with a 105 mm gun and the "FCM 1B" would use a petrol-mechanical transmission.

At first, progress with the FCM 1A prototype was satisfactory. Moritz was assured by Renault in January 1917 that the desired 200 CV (150 kW) engines were reliable and would pose no danger to the project. Moritz predicted that the first prototype would be ready by 1 May 1917. On 10 April 1917 he still assumed that the first trials could have begun within five weeks. On 16 April, the Nivelle offensive began. Although it had tactical successes, it failed to deal a strategic defeat on German forces and the first use of French tanks led to heavy losses (76 of the 128 combat tanks engaged were lost); in reaction, Thomas ordered all tank production and projects to be ended. This led to an emergency alliance between Estienne and Mourret to bring about a reversal of this decision. While Thomas was visiting Russia, Mourret surreptitiously ordered a restart of the tank projects. On his return, an enraged Thomas caused Mourret to be fired, removing Estienne's greatest rival. Meanwhile, there were unexplained delays in the delivery of the engines and the gearbox by Renault. On 5 June, FCM could only take note that the promised pieces had not arrived yet. On 24 June, the ministry of armament complained about the situation. On 13 August, Breton was told by Renault personally that it would take at least another three weeks. A possible explanation of the delays might be a decision by Renault to give priority to other projects. During a meeting of the CCAS on 18 October, Moritz at last announced that trials could begin on 20 November. In that meeting, Estienne was critical of heavy tanks: "the infantry has as much need of large tanks, as it needs 400 mm cannon; it has need of small tanks, as much as it needs 37 mm and machine-guns".

=== The FCM 1A ===
On 17 November, Moritz, introducing to the CCAS the forthcoming presentation of the FCM 1A prototype, explained it was a test bed that did not exactly correspond to the original "A version" specifications. The company, in its efforts to get a vehicle ready as soon as possible, had built a prototype that was largely based on the original mock-up and so much closer to the "B"-concept, albeit with a 105 mm gun and a petrol-mechanical transmission; hydraulic transmission had been abandoned by the CCAS on 10 May.

It was the largest tank built until that date. It had a length of 8.35 m (27 ft 5 in), a width of 2.84 m (9 ft 4 in), a hull height of 1.98 m (6 ft 6 in), a turret roof height of 2.785 m (9 ft 1.6 in) with cupola included 3 m (9 ft 10 in). It was also the first tank with protection against artillery HE rounds: the front hull was protected by 35 mm (1.38 in) thick armour plate as was the turret. The sides and rear were 21 mm (0.83 in) plate, the top and roof 15 mm (0.6 in). Total weight was 41.4 tonnes, of which 5.5 tonnes of hull armour and 1.3 tonnes of turret armour.

The hull of the FCM 1A was very elongated, in order to cross wide trenches. It was more-or-less compartmentalised into four sections, but these were not separated by bulkheads: a relatively short driver compartment at the front, a fighting compartment with a turret at its top, a larger munitions room and finally a large engine compartment at the rear. The last was enlarged at both sides over the tracks, to create room for long rectangular fuel tanks. The front of the hull followed the profile of the tall climbing faces of the tracks and therefore gradually curved upwards, ending in a high vertical nose plate. The glacis plate behind it was oriented almost horizontally and connected at its rear to the vertical top front plate of the driver compartment. As the turret ring was larger than the width of the hull, it partly rested on rounded lateral extensions. The turret was a truncated cone with a roof sloping down to the front, so that in side view its profile was wedge-shaped.

Originally, a crew of seven had been planned, but in December 1917 this had been reduced to six: the commander in the left of the turret aimed the gun; a second man in the right of the turret who combined the functions of gunner, machine-gunner and loader; a standing assistant-loader handing new rounds to the loader – at first two of these had been seen as necessary; a driver; a front machine-gunner; and a mechanic who doubled as a rear machine-gunner.

The main armament was the Canon de 105 Court Schneider, a 105 mm shortened to reduce its recoil to fit into a turret. It fired a HE shell with 4 kg (8 lb 13 oz) of explosives at a muzzle velocity of 240 m/s (790 ft/s). The large hull allowed for a large ammunition stock of 122 rounds. The commander pointed the gun by observing the target through a vane sight, fitted on the turret roof, from his rectangular "cupola". There were two Hotchkiss 8 mm machine-guns in fixed ball-mount positions; reserve machine-guns or pistols could be fired through five vertical slits that could be plugged: one at the rear of the turret, two at the turret sides and two at the hull sides below the turret rear.

In the prototype, a single Renault 220-metric-horsepower (160 kW) engine was installed, giving a maximum speed of 10 km/h (6.2 mph) and a minimum speed of 2 km/h (1.2 mph). The transmission was mechanical, using a disc clutch driving the tracks through a rear sprocket. The suspension was leaf sprung bogies of four wheels each with alternating external and internal flanges. The tracks, 600 mm (24 in) wide, gave a ground pressure of 0.6 kgf/cm^{2} (59 kPa; 8.5 psi). Ground clearance was 400 mm (16 in). The design deliberately had no overhanging front or rear sections, which had greatly hampered the mobility of the earlier French Schneider CA1 and Saint Chamond tanks. The tank could overcome a 1-metre-high (3.3 ft) vertical obstacle and cross a trench 3.5 m (11 ft) wide.

Mourret's stated motive in having the tank designed by a shipyard ensured much attention was given to ergonomics. It was less cramped than earlier designs; the crew could walk, slightly crouching, throughout the hull. The mechanic could access the engine from both sides, and the commander could communicate with the driver, the front machine-gunner and the mechanic via speaking tubes. External communications were the responsibility of the mechanic, who could open a small hatch just behind the turret to signal using flags, flares or electrical lights. The tank could be entered through the turret cupola, but each crew-member also had escape hatches above or below him.

=== Orders ===
On 20 December 1917, the first prototype was ready to be shown to an investigating commission of the CCAS, with actual trials being held at La Seyne-sur-Mer on 21 and 22 December. Mourret had been replaced as head of the commission by Estienne; British and American observers were present. The FCM 1A, with its futuristic appearance, made an excellent impression on those present. Moritz demonstrated that the vehicle was effortlessly capable of crossing 3.5 metre wide trenches, climb ninety centimetre high walls and descend into, and climb out of again, six metres wide and four metres deep craters. In woods, it could break a 28 centimetre thick pine tree and run over a 35 centimetre thick one. A speed of 6 km/h was attained. The main problem was that it proved difficult to steer the tank due to its extreme track length and insufficient chain link profile. The track would easily slip when braked, though it was on no occasion thrown. The aircraft engine tended to overheat and its basic lack of power resulted in a maximum 65% climbing slope. Though the first shortened 105 mm Schneider cannon had been received in October, the first live firing tests were only held on 5 and 7 February 1918, with satisfactory results.

Discussing the results of the trials, on 4 January 1918 the technical department of the Artillerie Spéciale concluded that the FCM 1A seemed a powerful combat vehicle capable of having an important negative effect on enemy morale. Already on 30 December, minister of munitions Louis Loucheur had thought that France "hadn't a minute to lose" and suggested to the French Prime Minister (Président du conseil) Georges Clemenceau to spend fifty million French francs to construct a hundred FCM 1As, the first fifteen to be delivered from July 1918 onwards, in order to have a strength of eighty vehicles on 31 December. However, Clemenceau would leave the decision to Estienne.

General Philippe Pétain, the new High Commander of the French Army, asked Estienne to use his position to end the project. Estienne told Pétain that this was ill-advised while the public was questioning why these heavy tanks had not been produced. Besides, the British and the US would only consent to give France 700 of the new jointly designed Mark VIII "Liberty" heavy tank if France had made at least a token effort to produce its own heavy tanks. Thus, the French authorities had to delay the project while outwardly endorsing it. Estienne had already set this course by choosing the heaviest version, the "C", for production, requiring a completely new prototype, causing a considerable delay. Then, Pétain demanded unreasonably high production numbers, thus delaying planning and initiating a political row.

Pétain asked for 300 heavy tanks to be ready by March 1919, for the Allied Plan 1919 strategy causing a quarrel to erupt between Clemenceau, who was both Prime Minister and Minister of War, and Loucheur, the Minister of Armament, who felt it was impossible to provide the labour and steel required. Meanwhile, Estienne and Pétain complicated the issue with further demands. Pétain asked for special pontoons, and Estienne demanded battering rams and electronic mine detectors to be fixed. When the war ended, not a single tank had been built.

At first, the production order for the Char 2C was cancelled. Despite the end of hostilities, however, strong political pressure to adopt new heavy tank projects remained, as there was now a considerable surplus capacity in the heavy industry. To stop this, the Direction de l’Artillerie d’Assaut on instigation of Estienne decided in April 1919 to procure ten Char 2Cs after all, and use this as an argument to reject any other projects. This was not completely successful; as late as 1920 it was proposed to the Section Technique des Appareils de Combat to build a 600-tonne tank with 250 mm armour. At FCM, Jammy and Savatier finished the Char 2C prototype, the other nine tanks being built almost simultaneously; all ten were delivered in 1921 and modified by the factory until 1923. They would be the last French tanks to be produced for the home market till the Char D1 pre-series of 1931.

== Description ==
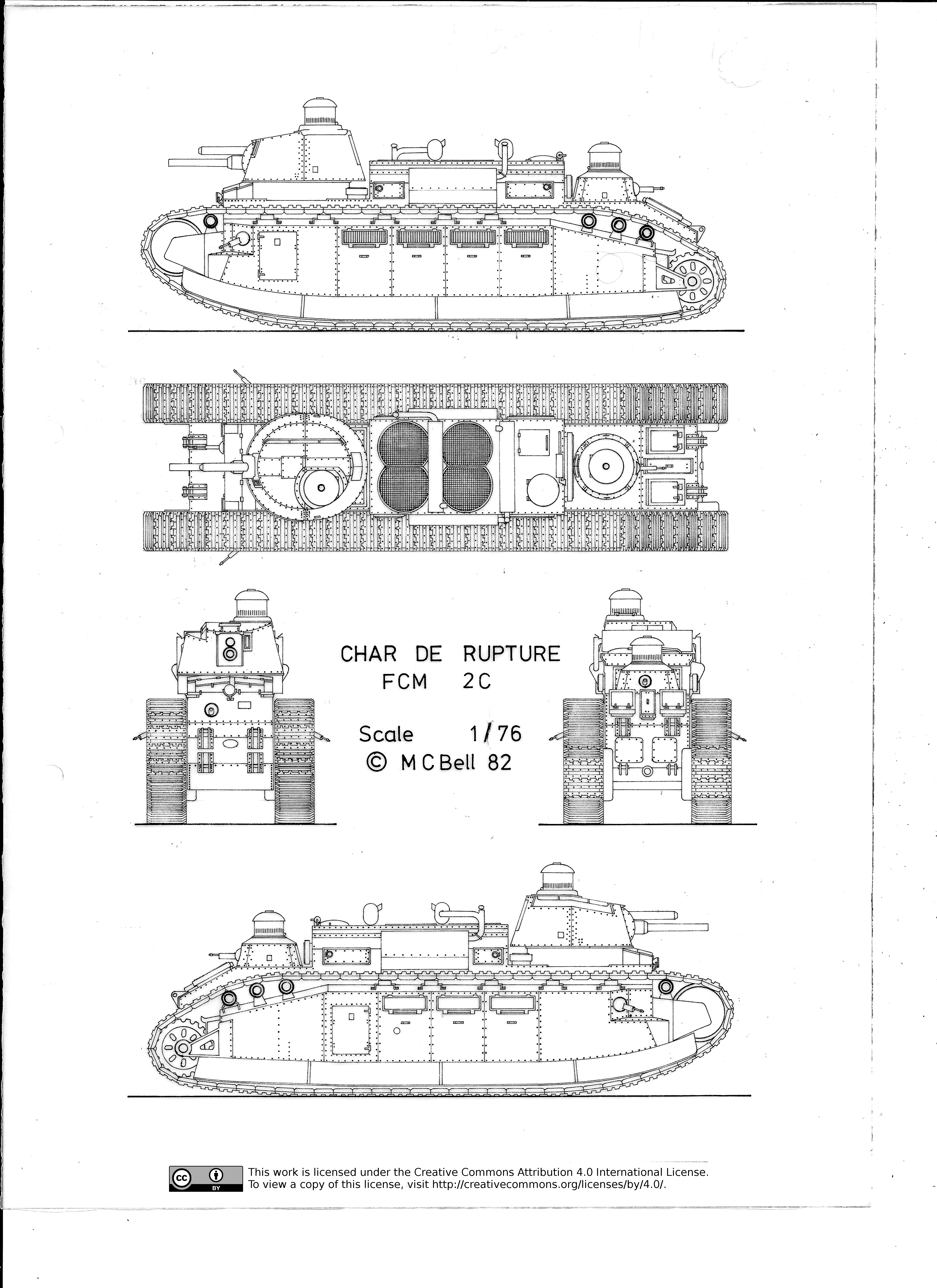
Plan of the FCM 2C

The Char 2C was the only super-heavy tank ever to attain operational status – a super-heavy tank is not simply a tank that is very heavy but one that has been deliberately made much heavier than regular tanks of its period. The next operational tank in weight would be the 70-tonne German Tiger II heavy tank of World War II, nearly 500 of which were produced.

The Char 2C had a loaded weight of 69 tonnes, partly because of its armour, which was among the thickest of World War I-era tanks, but mostly because of its huge size. It is the largest tank ever taken into production. With the tail fitted, the hull was over 12 m (39 ft 4 in) long. Without tail, the hull length was 10.37 metres (34 ft 0 in), the width 2.95 metres (9 ft 8 in), the height 3.8 metres (12 ft 6 in). With the main turret cupola, normally detached for transport, in place the overall height was 4.08 m (13 ft 5 in). The long track to relatively narrow width hampered steering and its manoeuvrability.

Its large size and weight made transportation difficult reducing strategic manoeuvrability. To move the tanks by rail they had to be slung between two (specially built) rail wagons; a process that took around four hours.

The armour thickness was 30 mm at the front, 22 mm at the sides, 13 mm at the top and 10 mm at the bottom. In 1930 and 1931, the vehicles were rebuilt with a frontal armour of 45 mm (1.8 in).

Within its ample frame there was room for two fighting compartments. The forward compartment was crowned by a three-man turret – the first such in history – mounting a shortened 75 mm field gun of the Canon de 75 modèle 1897 type, with 124 rounds firing at a muzzle velocity of 550 m/s (1,800 ft/s), and the second, at the rear of the tank, was topped by a machine-gun turret armed with a Hotchkiss 8 mm. The front turret, made of 35 mm plates, was placed so high that its crew had to climb into it by means of a ladder, sitting on seats suspended from the turret roof and operating on an elevated level compared to the hull machine gunners below. The rear turret was made of 22 mm thick plate. Three independent 8 mm machine guns all in ballmounts, one at each side and one to the right of the driver at the front, gave protection against infantry assault. The machinegun ammunition load was 9,504 rounds.

Both turrets had stroboscopic cupolas as a solution to the problems of direct vision from a tank. An inner cylindrical frame carried thick glass vision blocks. Around this was a thick (30mm) armoured shell pierced with narrow slots spaced evenly. In use an electric motor spun the outer shell at such a speed that, due to persistence of vision effect, the individual slots disappeared while their armour protection (including against bullet splash) remained.

The fighting compartments were connected by the engine room. In the design four engines had been planned but this was reduced to two, each track being powered by its own engine via an electrical transmission. The first engines were of the Chenu type, of 210 CV (150 kW) each. In 1923, these were replaced by captured German 6-cylinder 200 CV (150 kW) Mercedes engines allowing for a top speed of 12 km/h (7.5 mph). These original engines wore out quickly and were eventually in turn replaced by two 250 CV (180 kW) Maybach engines, 16,950 cc, which rendered a maximum speed of 15 km/h (9.3 mph). (Note: These were aero-engines taken from German airships (Zeppelins)) A corridor, tall enough for a crewman to stand upright, ran between the engines, allowing two electricians to constantly attend the complex apparatus. Seven fuel tanks, four to the left and three to the right, containing 1,260 litres, gave it a range of 150 kilometres. The suspension contained thirty-nine interleaving road wheels on each side, making for a total of ninety wheels on the tank. Designed to negotiate the challenging terrain of trench warfare, the type had in principle excellent mobility. The Char 2C could cross a trench 4.25 metres wide, enough to pass the typical canal sluices in northern France. A vertical obstacle could be climbed of 170 centimetres and a slope of 70%. The wading capacity was 140 centimetres. Ground clearance was sixty centimetres. The axle track, measured between the inner track sides, was 225 centimetres.

The tank required a crew of twelve: driver, commander, gunner, loader, four machine gunners, mechanic, electrician, assistant-electrician/mechanic and a radio operator. Some sources report thirteen, probably due to pictures of the crews that included the company commander. The assistant-mechanic was seated to the front right of the rear fighting compartment, over an escape hatch, and the radio operator was seated at the front left.

== Operational history ==
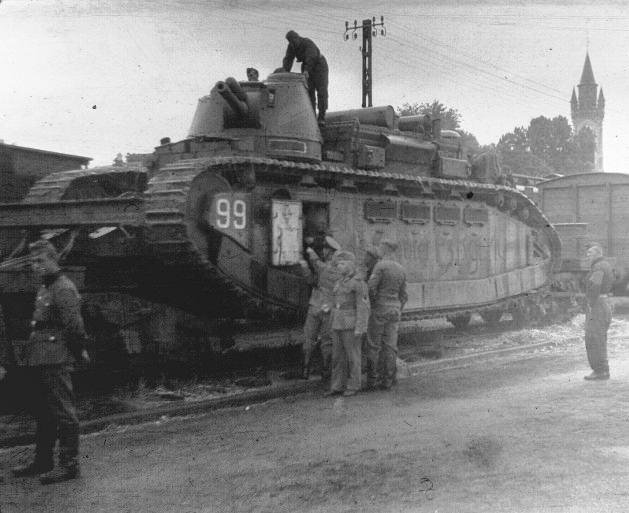
Champagne after capture by German forces in eastern France, June 1940

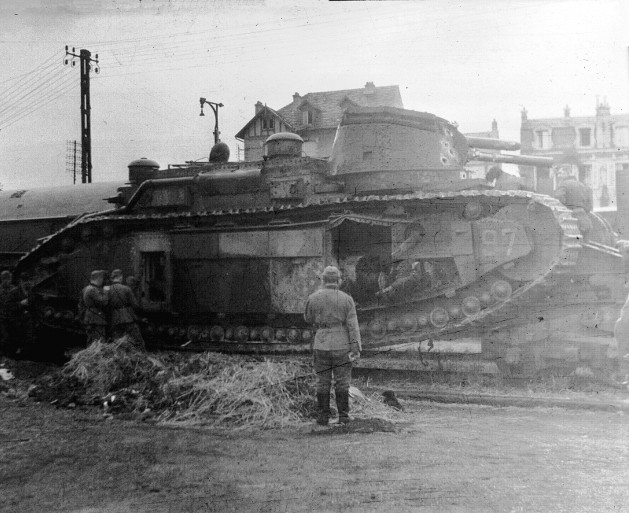
Lorraine in summer 1940

The ten tanks were part of several consecutive units, their organic strength at one time reduced to three. Their military value slowly decreased as more advanced tanks were developed throughout the 1920s and 1930s. By the end of the 1930s, they were largely obsolete, because their slow speed and high profile made them vulnerable to advances in anti-tank guns.

Nevertheless, during the French mobilisation of 1939, all ten were activated and put into their own unit, the 51st Bataillon de Chars de Combat. For propaganda, each tank had been named after one of the ancient regions of France, numbers 90-99 being named Poitou; Provence; Picardie; Alsace; Bretagne; Touraine; Anjou; Normandie; Berry; Champagne respectively. In 1939, the Normandie was renamed Lorraine. As their main value was in propaganda, the giants were kept carefully out of harm's way and did not participate in the September 1939 attack on the Siegfried Line. They were used instead for numerous morale-boosting movies, in which they were often shown climbing and crushing old French forts. To the public, they obtained the reputation of invincible super tanks, the imagined dimensions of which far surpassed the actual particulars.

French command was aware that this reputation was undeserved. When the German Panzerdivisionen, in the execution of Operation Fall Rot, breached the French lines after 10 June 1940, the decision was made to prevent the capture of the famous equipment. On 12 June 1940 the order was given to send the tanks south by rail transport. The broken down tanks N° 92 and 95 were destroyed, at Mairy-Mainville and Piennes respectively. The six remaining tanks hastily embarked on two trains at the station of Landres on 13 June. During the night they hid, still loaded, in the forest of Badonviller. As no orders had been received regarding their destination, they remained at this spot during the 14th, being bombed in the early afternoon but without incurring any damage. In the late afternoon, an order arrived to send the tanks to Neufchâteau which was reached in the early morning of 15 June. There it was decided to travel to Dijon. However, fifteen kilometres south of Neufchâteau near the Meuse-sur-Meuse station, in a curve of the railway, the track was blocked by a blazing fuel train, while other trains jammed the exit to the rear. Due to the curve, it was impossible to unload the tanks. To prevent a capture of the matériel by the enemy, it was ordered to destroy the vehicles. Charges were placed and the fuel pipes cut. The gasoline was lit and the tanks exploded around 19:00. The crews escaped to the south. The wrecks were subsequently discovered by the 8. Panzerdivision. Later Joseph Goebbels and Hermann Goering claimed that the tanks had been destroyed by German dive bombers. This German propaganda myth was accepted as an authentic event by contemporary writers and later repeated in many postwar sources. One tank, the Champagne, was nevertheless captured more or less intact and brought to Berlin to be exhibited as a war trophy until disappearing in 1948. After the war, rumours circulated that this vehicle had been transported to the Soviet Union.

== Versions ==
After a decision taken in December 1922, from 1923 until 1926 the later Champagne was modified at La Seyne into the Char 2C bis, an experimental type with a 155 mm howitzer in a rounded cast steel turret. The howitzer had a muzzle velocity of 200 m/s. New engines of the Soutter-Harlé type were fitted and the three independent machine gun positions deleted. In this configuration, the tank weighed perhaps 74 tons. The change was only temporary though, as the vehicle was brought back into its previous condition after 1934; the new turret was used in the Tunisian Mareth Line.

Between 15 November and 15 December 1939, the Lorraine, as the company command tank, was experimentally up-armoured at the Société des Aciéries d'Homecourt to make it immune to standard German antitank guns. The front armour was enhanced to 90 mm, the side to 65 mm. In this configuration, weighing about 75 tons, the Lorraine had at that time the thickest armour of any operational tank, and is probably still the heaviest operational tank ever.

== Replacement ==
In 1940, twelve FCM F1 tanks were ordered, another very large twin-turret tank. France was defeated before they entered service.

== See also ==
- Tanks in France
