= Stroboscopic cupola =

Tank cupola design

The stroboscopic cupola was a historical tank cupola design consisting of armoured outer and inner cylinders, both pierced by several regularly spaced vertical vision slits around the circumference. Rapidly rotating the external cylinder (in the case of the Char 2C tank design, at 300 rpm with an electric motor) created the visual illusion of seeing through the cupola as if it was not there due to human persistence of vision, similar to how a plank fence with alternating planks and holes fades from view when the observer moves alongside it at a speed. The short time that both the inner and outer slits were perfectly aligned at any given moment still afforded protection of the inside space, as any projectile not capable of piercing the armour directly would need to hit the spaced out slits and to come at an optimum angle and timing to go through both outer and inner slit. Additionally, it still allowed a better view of the surroundings than just a single vision slit or periscope with a very narrow field of view.
