= Florentine tower of Buire =

Florentine Tower of Buire
- Tour Florentine de Buire
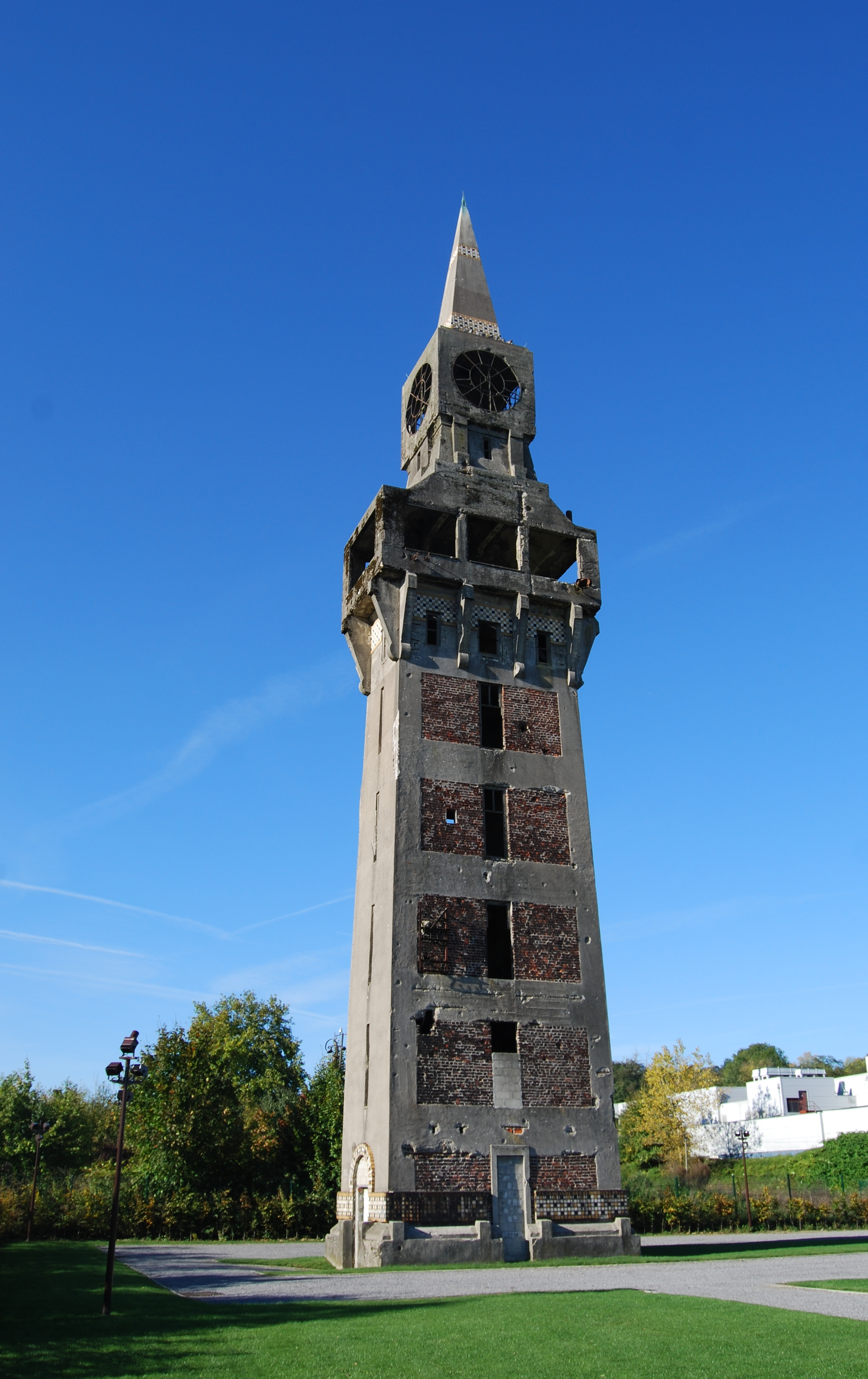
- Interactive map of the Florentine Tower of Buire area

General information
- Type: Railway tower
- Location: Buire, France
- Coordinates: 49.910596°N 4.073305°E
- Construction started: 1920
- Completed: 1921
- Owner: City of Buire

Technical details
- Floor count: 6

Design and construction
- Architect: Gustave Umbdenstock
- Main contractor: Compagnie des chemins de fer du Nord

The Florentine Tower of Buire (French: Tour Florentine de Buire), located in the commune of Buire in the Aisne department in Picardy in northern France, is a former 45.76 meter tallsignal box. Since November 6, 1995, it has been classified as a monument historique (National Heritage Site of France). It is the work of French architect Gustave Umbdenstock and the engineer Raoul Dautry employed by the Compagnie des chemins de fer du Nord. The decision to build the tower was made following the development of the railway station of Hirson, which, due to the development of the local mining and metallurgical industry, became the second most important French rail junction (after Paris) in the early twentieth century.

It was built in 1920-1921, in reinforced concrete, and based on the traditional brick Art déco style of northern belfries.

The tower has six floors:

- Ground floor: cable entry
- 1st floor: store
- 2nd floor: unassigned
- 3rd floor: small workshop
- 4th floor: sanitation
- 5th floor: room containing relays
- 6th floor: control room with the optical panel of the Mors railroad switch.

The top of the tower was equipped with four clocks (one for each cardinal direction), each 3.20 meters in diameter.

The name Florentine is explained by reference to typical buildings of Florence or the fact that the contractor who built the Tower of Lens was Florentine.

The tower has been unused since 1944.

== Gallery ==
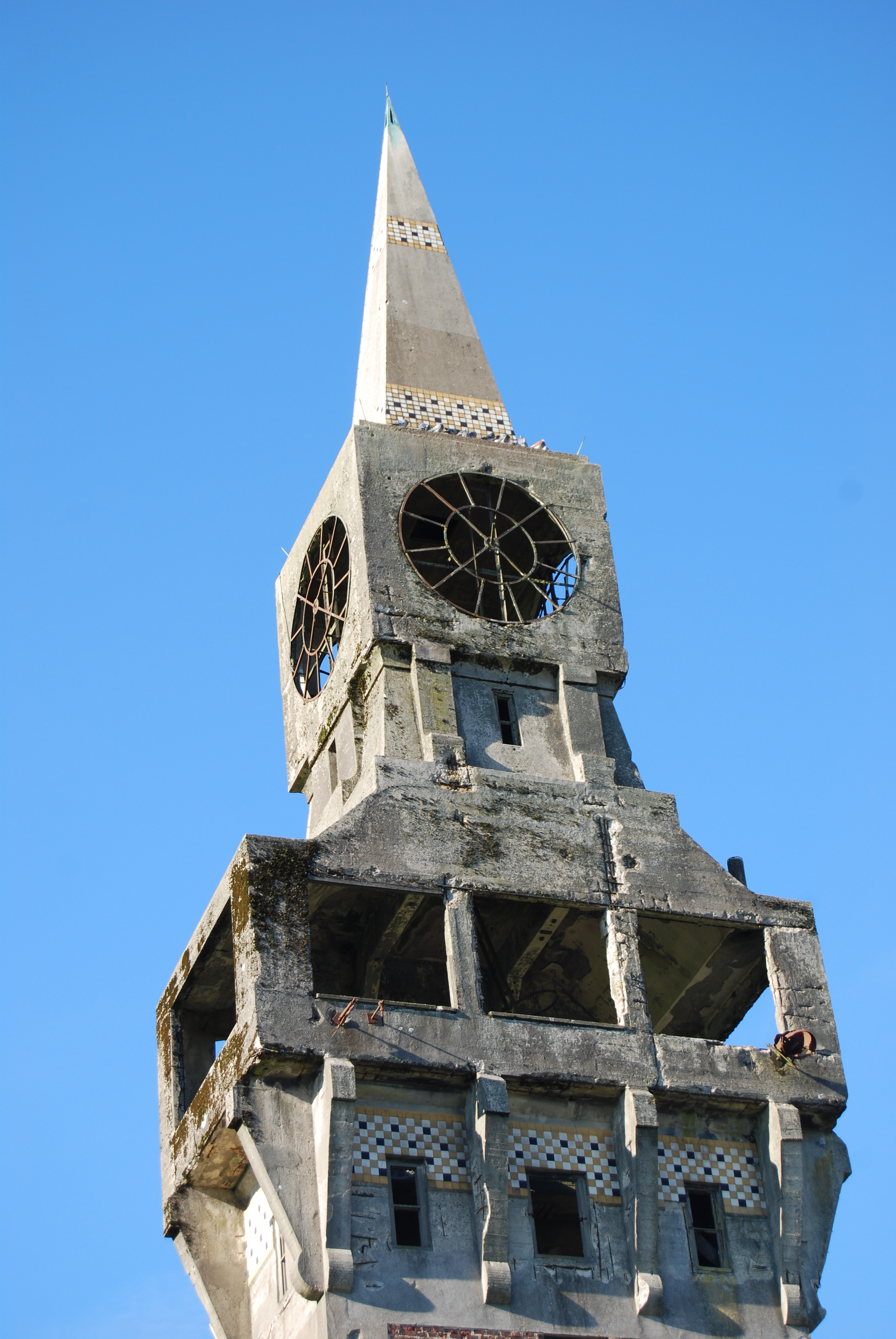

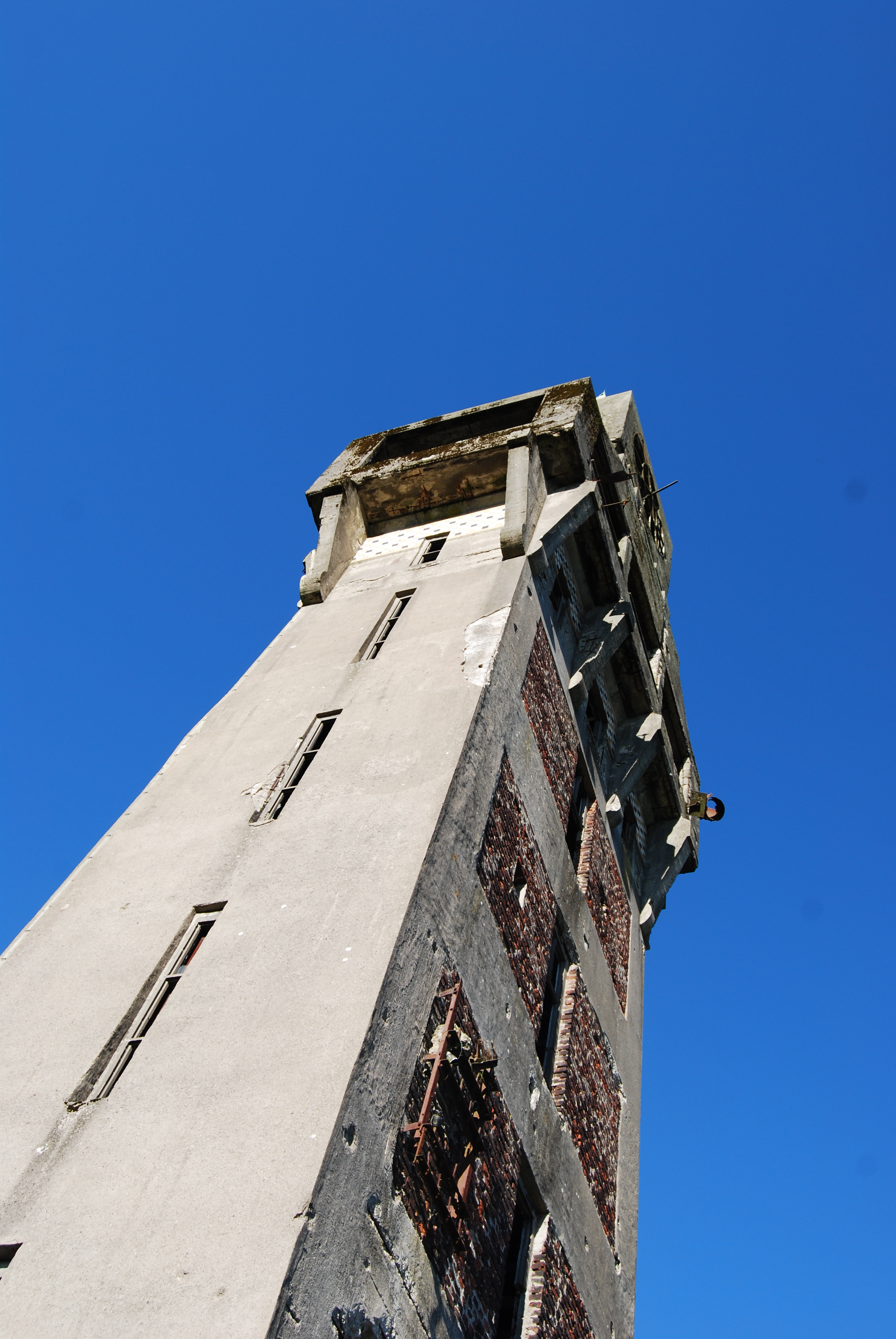

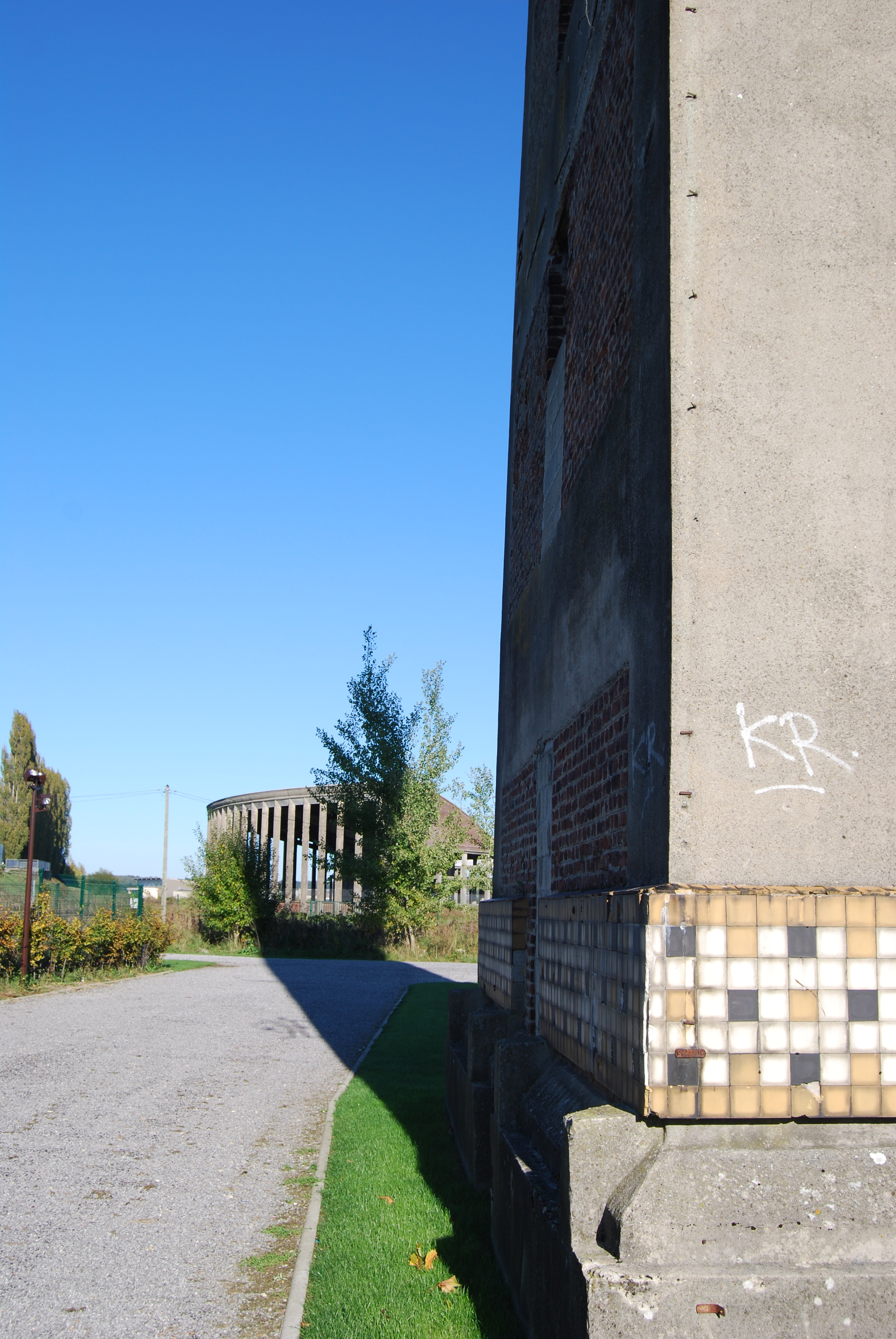

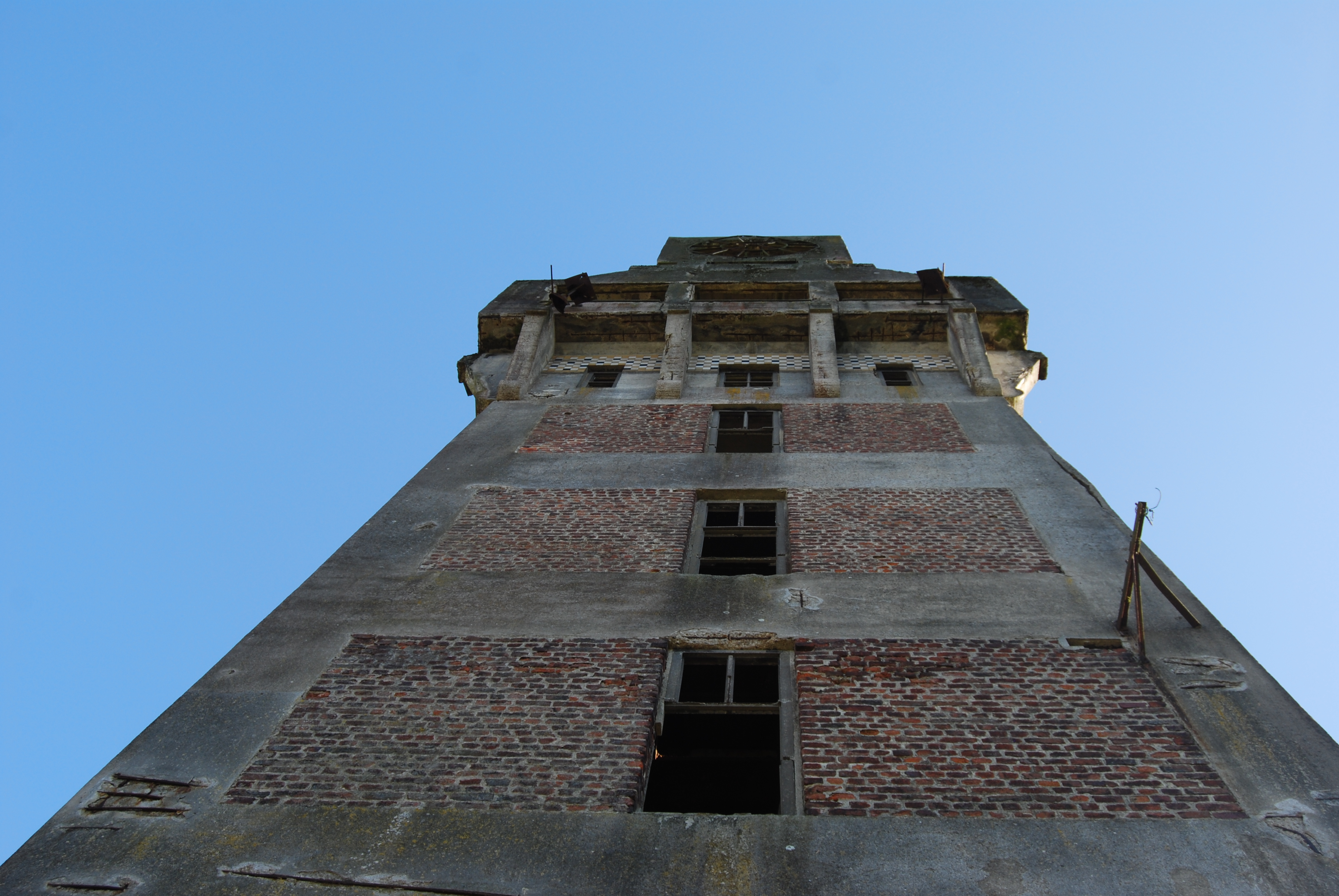

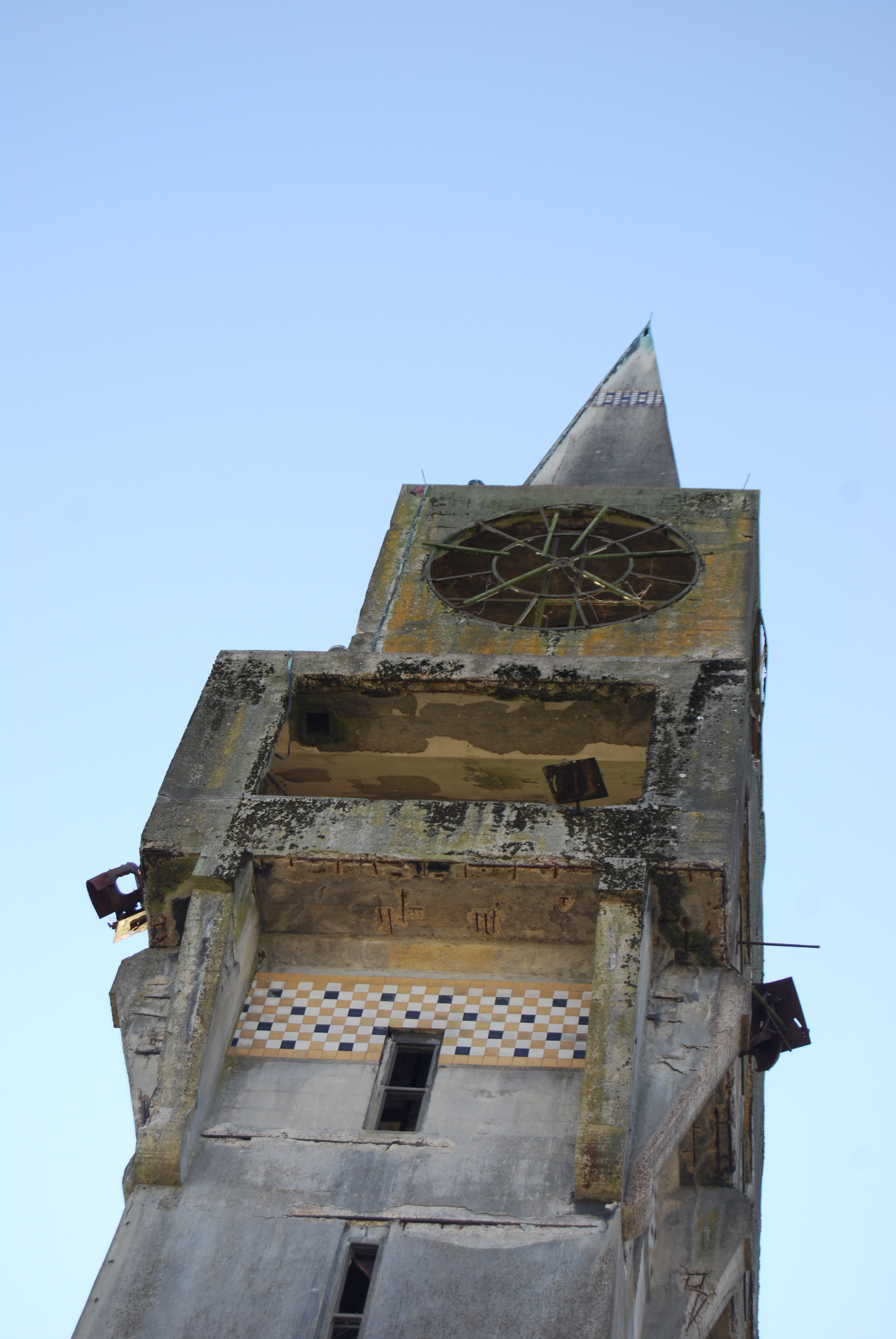

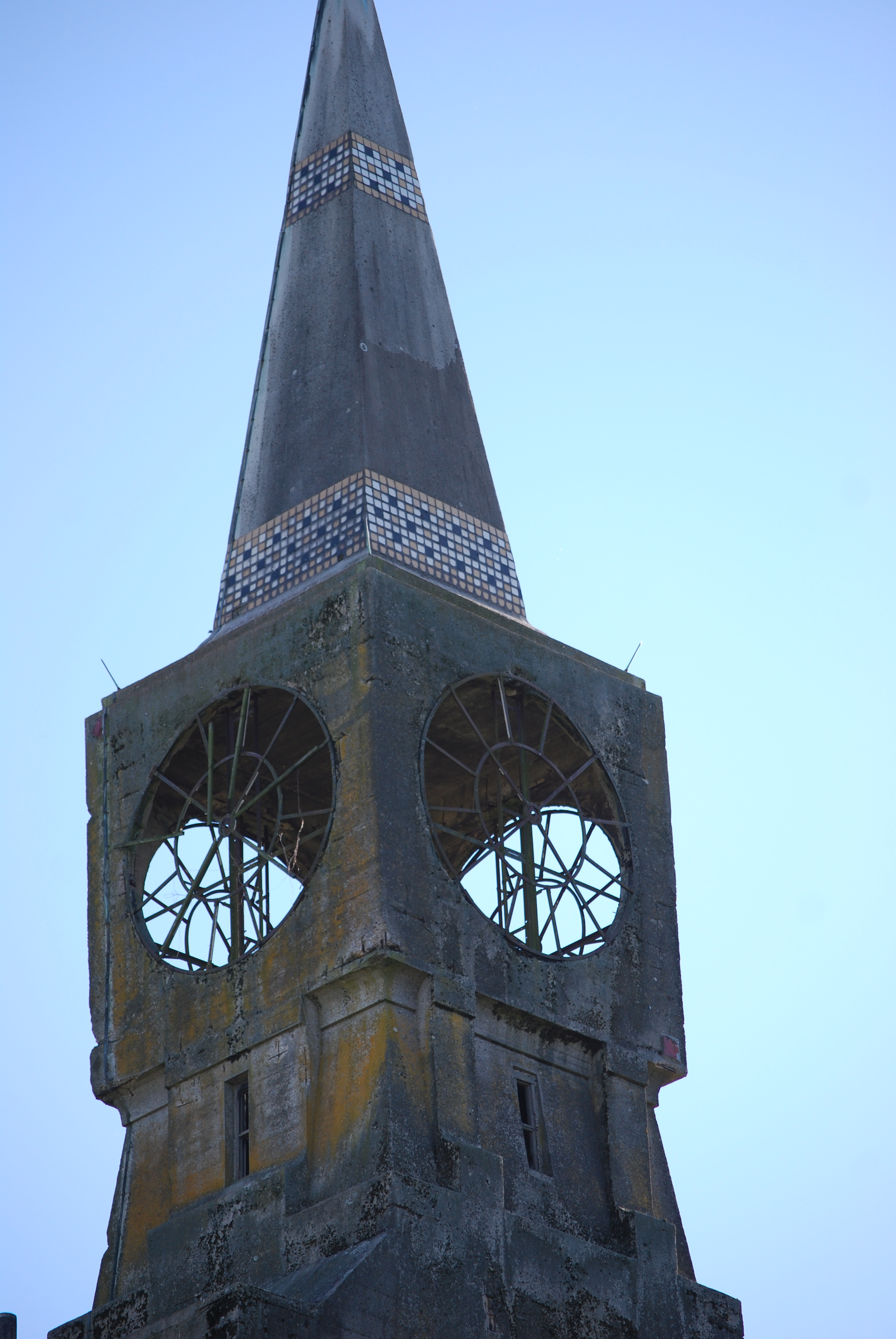

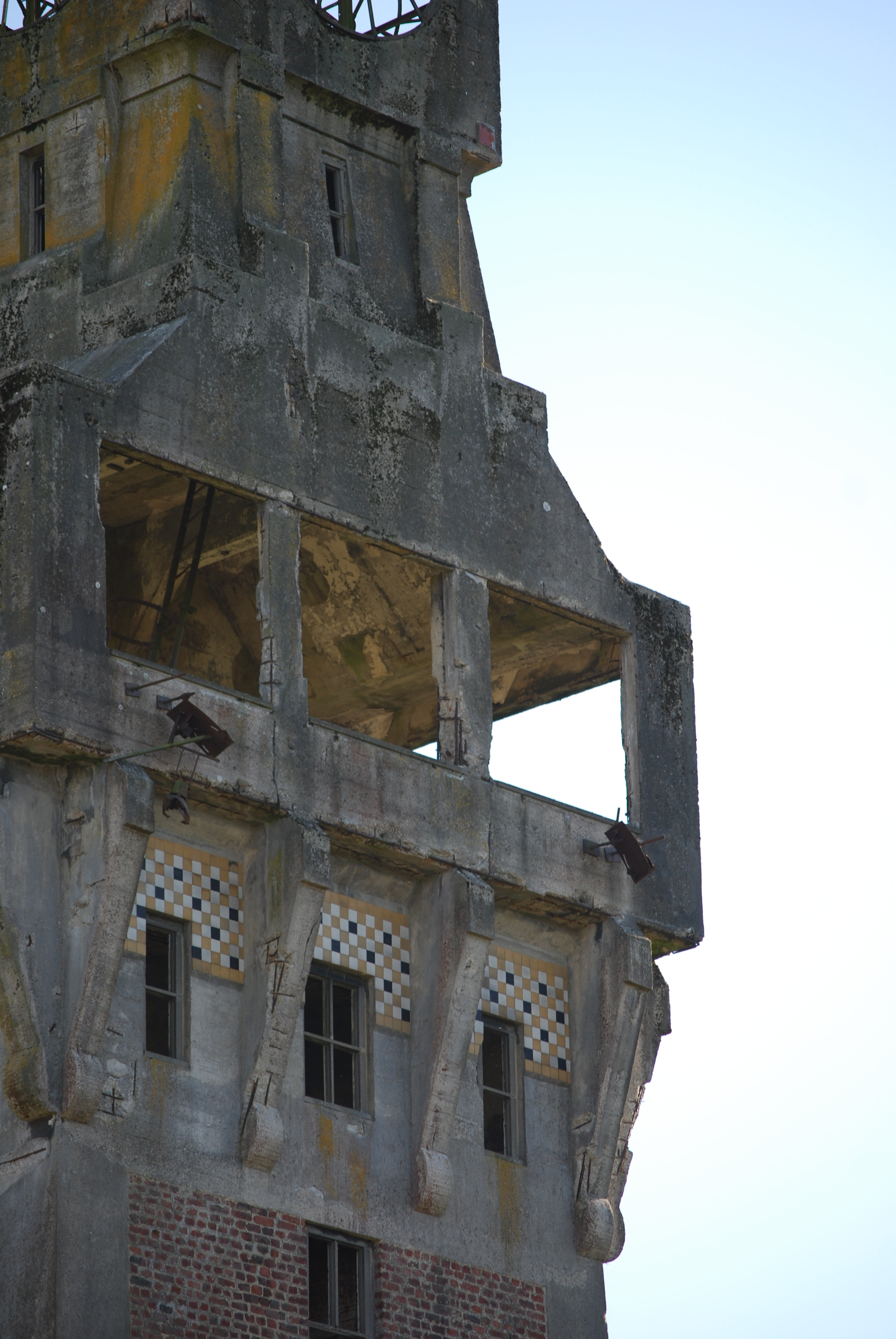

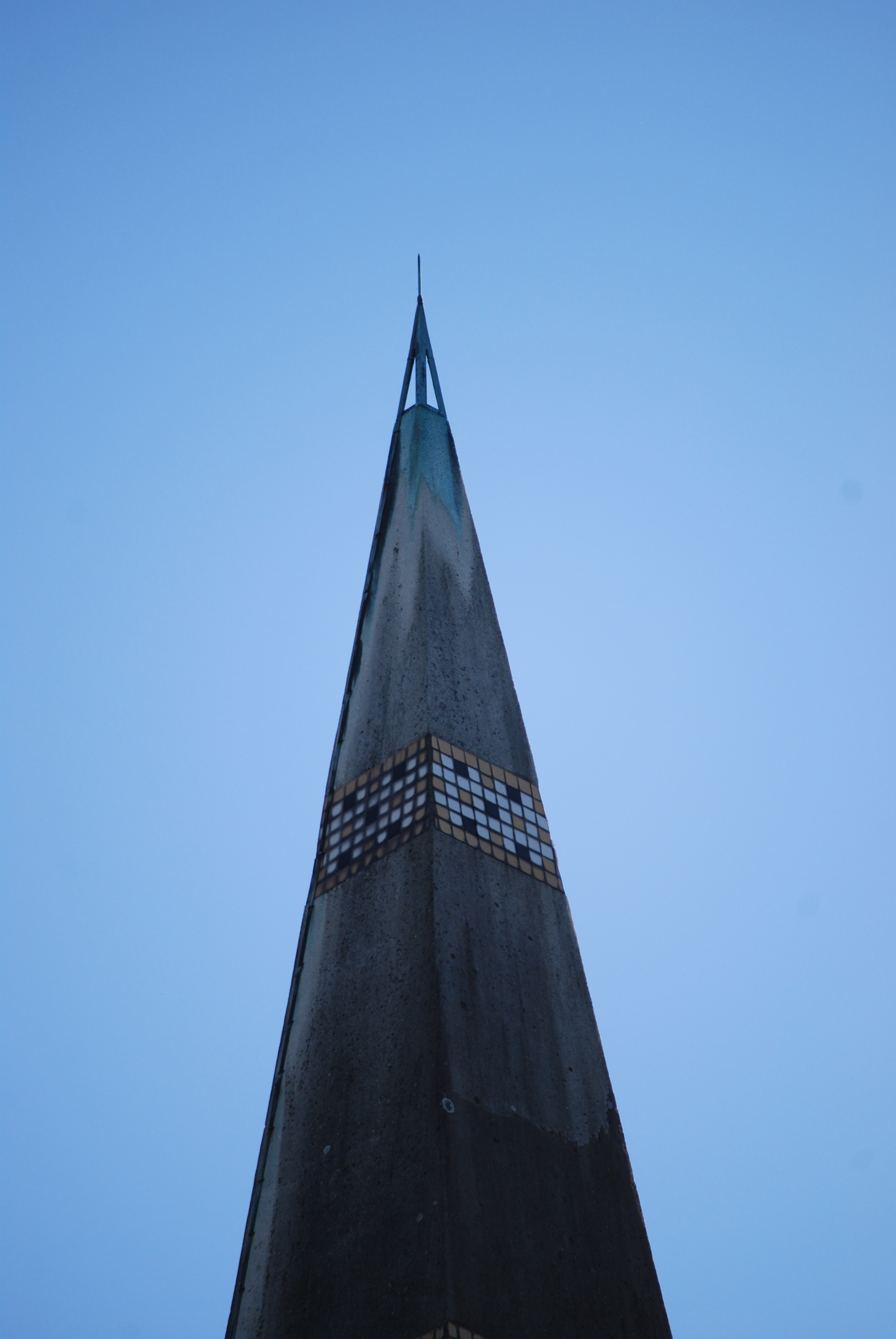
