= Raoul Dautry =

French engineer and politician

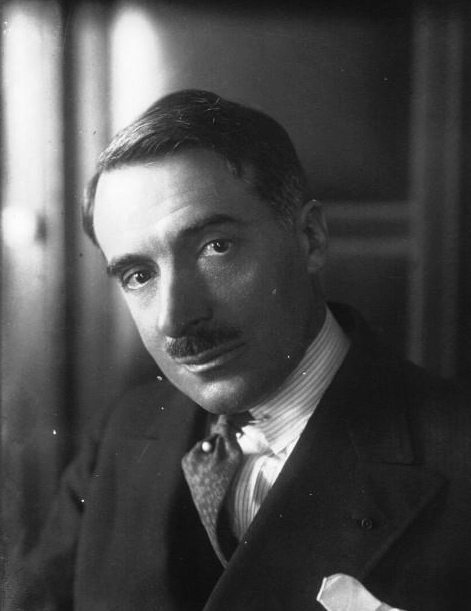

Raoul Dautry (16 September 1880 – 21 August 1951) was a French engineer, business leader and politician. He was born on 16 September 1880 at Montluçon in the department of Allier; he died on 21 August 1951 at Lourmarin in the department of Vaucluse.

== Education and career ==
After graduating from the École Polytechnique in 1900, he began a career with the railway company, Chemin de Fer du Nord. In 1914, during World War I, he set up a railway routing system which enabled reinforcements to be transferred to the front for the Battle of the Marne. It was under his direction that a new track was laid in a hundred days from Beauvais to the front. He held a number of important posts in the railways. He was director general of the Chemins de fer de l'État (State Railways) from 1928 to 1937 and when the French National Railways (SNCF) were set up in 1938, he became a member of its governing body.

Dautry was Armaments Minister from 20 September 1939 to 16 June 1940 in the governments of Daladier and Reynaud. He obtained the permission of Daladier to send a mission to Norway to look for the stocks of heavy water which the Germans were anxious to obtain. During the German occupation of France, he withdrew from political life and retired to his home in Lourmarin in the department of Vaucluse.

After the liberation, he was appointed Minister of Reconstruction and Urban Development by General Charles de Gaulle, a post which he held from 16 November 1944 to 20 January 1946. Thereafter he became general director of the Commissariat à l'énergie atomique (French Atomic Energy Commission). It was in this capacity that he selected Saclay as the site for an atomic plant.

In 1946, he was elected to the French Academy of Political and Moral Sciences.

He was elected Mayor of Lourmarin and named a Grand Officier of the Legion d’Honneur.

== See also ==
- Florentine tower of Buire
