= Minister of Armaments (France) =

The Minister of Armaments and War Production (French: Ministre de l'Armement et des fabrications de guerre) was a position in the France cabinet during World War I (1914–18), and the Minister of Armaments (French: Ministre à l’Armement} was a cabinet post during and after World War II (1939–45).

== Ministers ==
Start	End	Officeholder	Title
12 December 1916	12 September 1917	Albert Thomas	Ministre de l'Armement et des fabrications de guerre
12 September 1917	16 November 1918	Louis Loucheur	Ministre de l'Armement, des fabrications de guerre et de la Reconstruction industrielle
13 September 1939	16 June 1940	Raoul Dautry	Ministre à l’Armement
7 June 1943	9 November 1943	Jean Monnet	Commissaire à l'Armement, à l'Approvisionnement et à la Reconstruction
21 November 1945	16 December 1946	Charles Tillon	Ministre à l’Armement
20 January 1952	8 March 1952	Maurice Bourgès-Maunoury	Ministre à l’Armement

== Sub-Secretaries of State ==
Start	End	Officeholder	Title
26 August 1914	12 December 1916	Albert Thomas	Sous-secrétariat d'Etat à l'artillerie et à l'équipement militaire
14 December 1916	13 November 1917	Jules Breton	Sous-secrétaire d'Etat des inventions intéressant la défense nationale
14 December 1916	12 September 1917	Louis Loucheur	Sous-secrétaire d'État de l'Armement et la Fabrication de guerre chargé des Fabrications de guerre
21 March	10 May 1940	François Blancho	Sous-secrétaire d'État à l'Armement
24 June 1946	18 December 1946	Georges Gosnat	Sous-secrétaire d'État à l'Armement
16 December 1946	22 January 1947	Paul Béchard	Sous-secrétaire d'État à l'Armement
31 October 1947	24 November 1947	Joannès Dupraz	Sous-secrétaire d'État à l'Armement
20 January 1955	23 February 1955	Diomède Catroux	Sous-secrétaire d'État à l'Armement

== Sources ==
- "Albert THOMAS DIT ALBERT-THOMAS". Base de données des députés français depuis 1789. French National Assembly.
- "Charles, Joseph TILLON". Base de données des députés français depuis 1789. French National Assembly.
- "Diomède, Anne, Claude CATROUX". Base de données des députés français depuis 1789. French National Assembly.
- "Jules-Louis BRETON". Base de données des députés français depuis 1789. French National Assembly.
- "Le Comité français de la libération nationale". Digithèque MJP.
- "Louis LOUCHEUR". Base de données des députés français depuis 1789. French National Assembly.
- "Maurice, Jean, Marie BOURGÈS-MAUNOURY". Base de données des députés français depuis 1789. French National Assembly.
- "Paul BÉCHARD". Base de données des députés français depuis 1789. French National Assembly.
- "Raoul François DAUTRY (1880-1951)". Les Annales des Mines.
