= Undersecretary of State (France) =

Deputy ministerial role in French government

In France the Undersecretary of State (sous-secrétaire d'État) was a governmental role created during the Hundred Days and institutionalized in 1816. It served as an administrative and, later, political assistant to ministers, evolving significantly across the country's political regimes until being replaced by the title of Secretary of State under the Fifth Republic.

The role was created in France during the Hundred Days, with the first two Undersecretaries of State appointed to Foreign Affairs under the Napoleonic government of the Hundred Days. The institution was formalized by an ordinance on May 9, 1816, which allowed an Undersecretary of State (or more than one, if necessary) to be attached to a minister. Each minister held the title of Minister-Secretary of State (e.g., Minister-Secretary of State for the Interior). The mission of the Undersecretary of State covered the entire administration of the ministry, delegated by the minister.

Except during the Second French Empire, subsequent regimes up to and including the Fourth Republic maintained the principle of Undersecretaries of State. However, there were not always Undersecretaries of State in every government, and their numbers varied greatly from one government to another.

== Hundred Days ==
During the Hundred Days, Emperor Napoleon created the first Undersecretaries of State. By a decree on March 24, 1815, he appointed two individuals, Édouard Bignon and Louis-Guillaume Otto, to serve under Armand de Caulaincourt.

== Bourbon Restoration ==
Under the Bourbon Restoration, Louis XVIII, by an ordinance on May 9, 1816, created the institution of Undersecretaries of State.

== July Monarchy ==
Under the July Monarchy, Louis-Philippe I retained the Undersecretaries of State. While their role under the Bourbon Restoration was primarily administrative, it became more political during the July Monarchy.

The number of Undersecretaries of State remained small: at most, at most there were three under the third Soult government for nine ministers; with other governments having two or one. Some governments functioned without them, and there were no Undersecretaries of State between March 1831 and March 1835.

== Second Republic ==
Under the Second Republic, the Constituent Assembly, by a decree on June 14, 1848, confirmed by a law on March 15, 1849, prohibited Undersecretaries of State from being selected from among its members or those of the Legislative Assembly. Deprived of their political utility, Undersecretaries of State quickly disappeared.

== Second Empire ==
Under the Second Empire, Napoleon III chose not to reinstate Undersecretaries of State.

== Third Republic ==
Under the Third Republic, the first Undersecretaries of State were appointed on November 11, 1873, under the government of Albert de Broglie. The constitutional laws of February 24-25 and July 16, 1875 made no reference to them. However, their existence was recognized in the Organic Law of November 30, 1875, on the Election of Deputies.

Undersecretaries of State became more numerous, appearing in most governments, often in large numbers. Starting in 1893, some were assigned specific responsibilities, and Undersecretariats of State were established for those areas. For instance, from 1896 to 1913, with few interruptions, there was an Undersecretariat of State for Posts and Telegraphs.

In 1936, three women became members of a French government for the first time as Undersecretaries of State: Cécile Brunschvicg, Irène Joliot-Curie, and Suzanne Lacore, respectively assigned to National Education, Research, and Child Protection.

Several areas of ministerial action were initially entrusted to an Undersecretariat of State, such as technical education (1920) or youth and scientific research (1936).

From June 6 to June 16, 1940, General de Gaulle served as Undersecretary of State for National Defense and War in the cabinet of Paul Reynaud.

Undersecretaries of State were appointed by decree of the President of the Republic.

Unlike ministers, they were not members of the Council of Ministers by default. However, they almost always had access to the Cabinet Council and sometimes to the Council of Ministers.

They had access to either chamber of Parliament, even if they were not members, and had the same priority to speak as ministers.

They did not countersign acts of the President of the Republic.

The salary of Undersecretaries of State was not fixed by permanent law but determined annually by the budget law. Before World War I, it ranged from 20,000 to 30,000 francs per year. When an Undersecretary of State was also a member of Parliament, their parliamentary indemnity was deducted from this amount.

== Fourth Republic ==
Under the Fourth Republic, some governments included both Secretaries of State and Undersecretaries of State.

In 1946, Andrée Viénot became the first woman to be appointed as a member of a government during the Fourth Republic, serving as Undersecretary of State for Youth and Sports.

== Fifth Republic ==
Under the Fifth Republic, the title of Secretary of State definitively replaced that of Undersecretary of State.
