= SU-100Y =

1940 Soviet self-propelled gun prototype

T-100Y / SU-100Y
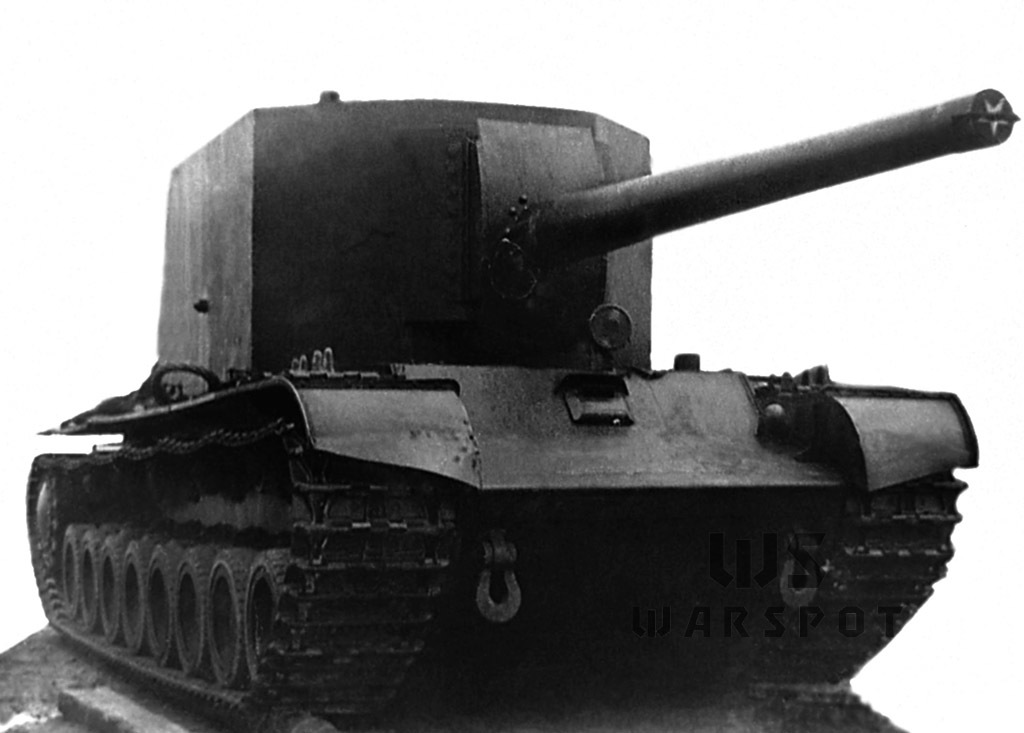
- The T-100Y prototype at Factory N°185.
- Type: Self-propelled gun
- Place of origin: Soviet Union

Production history
- Designed: 1940
- Manufacturer: Soviet Union
- Produced: 1940
- No. built: 1 prototype

Specifications
- Mass: 64 tonnes
- Length: 10.9 m (35 ft 9 in)
- Width: 3.4 m (11 ft 2 in)
- Height: 3.29 m (10 ft 10 in)
- Crew: 6 (Commander/Vertical Traverser, Gunner/Horizontal Traverser/Leverman-Firer, x2 Loaders, Driver, Radio Operator)
- Armor: 60 millimetres (2.4 in) front
- Main armament: 130 mm Naval Gun B-13
- Engine: Mikulin GAM-34BT; 890 hp (660 kW)
- Suspension: Torsion bar
- Maximum speed: 35 km/h (22 mph) on road

The SU-100Y, initially designated T-100Y, was a Soviet prototype self-propelled gun, developed from the chassis of the prototype T-100 tank. It was developed during the Winter War with Finland to include a 130 mm gun to destroy concrete defensive structures like bunkers and anti-tank obstacles along with the use as a tank destroyer. It did not see serial production.

== Development ==
In December 1939, the Northwest Command of the Red Army requested that the N°185 factory develop a vehicle based on the T-100. The vehicle had not only to operate as a self-propelled gun, but also to be used to lay bridges, transport explosives, and recover tanks destroyed or damaged on the battlefield. During the development of this vehicle, the ABTU proposed mounting the large, high velocity 152 mm cannon on the T-100 in order to give it the capacity to destroy bunkers and other strong fixed fortifications. The plant manager at N°185 proposed stopping development of the prototype to use T-100 as a self-propelled gun/tank destroyer armed with the 100 and 130 mm naval guns. This idea was accepted and on January 8, 1940, the plans for the T-100X were finalized and sent to the Izhorskyi factory. The T-100X had a box-shaped fighting compartment and was equipped with the 130 mm B-13 naval gun. For mobility, it kept the torsion bar suspension system, as was the trend in modern tanks of the time. During the development of the prototype, the shape of the fighting compartment was modified to reduce ammunition loading times. The new design was the T-100Y (re-designated SU-100Y in 1945). The designs of the SU-100Y were sent to the Izhorskyi factory on February 24, 1940, and assembly began on the first of the month. The self-propelled gun was tested for the first time on March 14. As the Winter War with Finland had ended, the T-100Y was never deployed against Finland but was successfully tested against former Polish fortifications in the Kiev Special Military District, along with the KV-2 and the two SU-14 prototypes. There were several complaints: the mantlet was installed with no regard for balance, which made aiming difficult, the fighting compartment was too cramped, and there were several issues with the running gear. The T-100Y was sent to factory N°174 for correction of these defects, since factory N°185 no longer existed, as it was absorbed into factory N°174. Not much came of such changes, since the T-100Y lost its last chance at mass production in June 1940. The design could have served as a temporary solution, but the ABTU was leaning towards the chassis of SMK as it shared components with the KV-1, to have a standardization of components. The decision of the Council of People's Commissars and Central Committee of the VKP(b) was published on July 17, 1940, sealing the fate of the T-100Y. The prototype was left to rust away at the Kubinka proving grounds before the start of the German invasion.

In a report from April 1, 1941, a commission noted that the fighting compartment, gun, engine, and transmission parts of the prototype were covered in rust due to poor storage. With the start of Operation Barbarossa, as the German forces approached Moscow, the two SU-14 and T-100Y prototypes were shipped to Kazan in the fall of 1941, where they served as specimens in technical courses, returning to Kubinka in 1943. The SU-100Y is currently on display together with the SU-14-1, at the area #1 of the Patriot Park in Kubinka.

Despite the fact that the T-100Y was not very successful, it is hard to call it a complete failure. It was one of the first Soviet assault guns, paving the way for the SU-152, accepted into service on February 14, 1943.

== Design ==
Armor layout

A spacious, fully enclosed casemate with a height of 3.29 meters was welded from armor plates 60 mm thick all-around. Since the vehicle would fire directly from a range of 1500-2000 m, while effectively protected even against enemy field artillery fire along, as well as 37-85mm anti-tank guns. With such impressive protection, the weight was tremendous, however, sources differ: some documents give the weight as 58 tons, others as 64, some as 68. The truth is likely somewhere in the middle. Despite the increased weight, mobility remained at the level of the T-100. The T-100Y was no doubt a more successful vehicle than the SU-14.

Armament

The main armament of the vehicle was a 130 mm B-13 naval cannon, which, thanks to its excellent ballistics, was used to equip cruisers and coastal batteries. A feature of the gun was a 55-caliber barrel, which provided the projectile with an initial velocity of over 800 m/s, so even with an elevation angle of about 30 °, it was possible to reach a firing range of about 20 km. The gun also had a high rate of fire - 10-12 rounds per minute. The penetration was good, being able to penetrate a max of 202mm of armour and even 158mm of armour at 2000m with SAPCBC shells, designated PB-46A. To fire the gun, a lever located at the left-hand side of the gun was used. There was no telescopic sight to aim the cannon, it was aimed using the PT-1 and PTK periscopes in the vehicle. Also, the B-13 projectile had 2.5 kg of explosives. For comparison, the 122 mm D-25T projectile had only 1.6 kg of explosives in its shell. The ammunition included 30 separate loading rounds, which affected the size of the crew, of which included two loaders, with 15 SAPCBC shells and another 15 HE shells.

Engine and running gear

Its engine was the GAM-34 engine with a power input of 890 hp, previously installed on torpedo speed boats. The powerful engine allowed the heavy tank to move along the highway at a speed of 35 km/h, but on rough terrain, only 16 km/h. The chassis and running gear of the SU-100Y was completely borrowed from the T-100 tank.

== Gallery ==
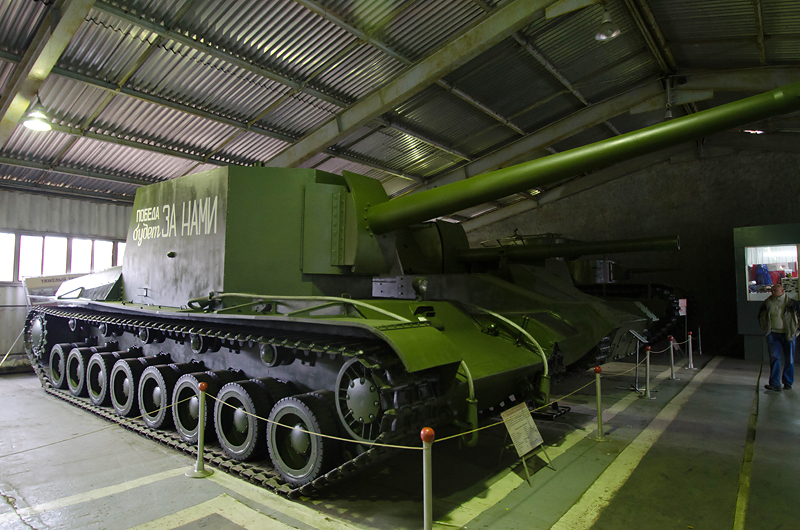
The single SU-100Y at Kubinka Tank Museum

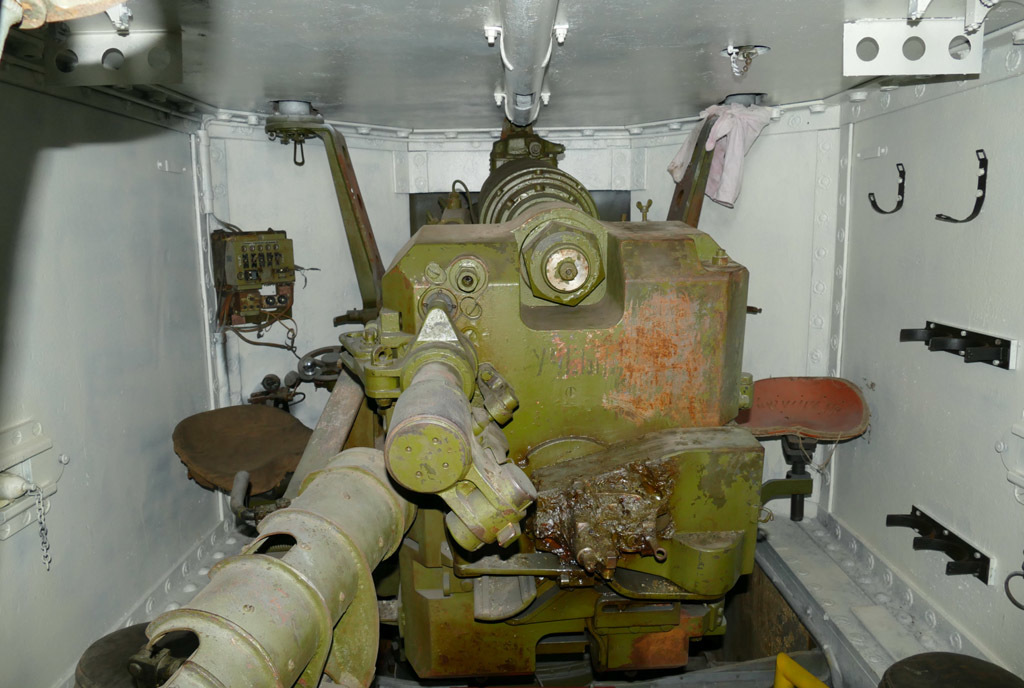
The cramped fighting compartment of the SU-100Y.

== See also ==
- SU-100
- SU-152
- SU-85

=== Tanks of comparable role, performance and era ===
- American T28 super-heavy tank
- British Tortoise heavy assault tank
- German Jagdtiger

== Sources ==
- Milsom, John (1971). Russian Tanks, 1900–1970: The complete illustrated history of Soviet armoured theory and Design. Mechanicsburg, PA: Stackpole Books. ISBN 0-8117-1493-4.
- Pasholok, Yuri (December 31, 2021). "A Second Life for Obsolete Chassis". TankArchives.ca.
- Pasholok, Yuri (December 13, 2013). "The Oldest Exhibit in the Museum". livejournal.
