= 45 mm anti-tank gun M1932 (19-K) =

Soviet light anti-tank gun

45 mm anti-tank gun model 1932 (19-K)
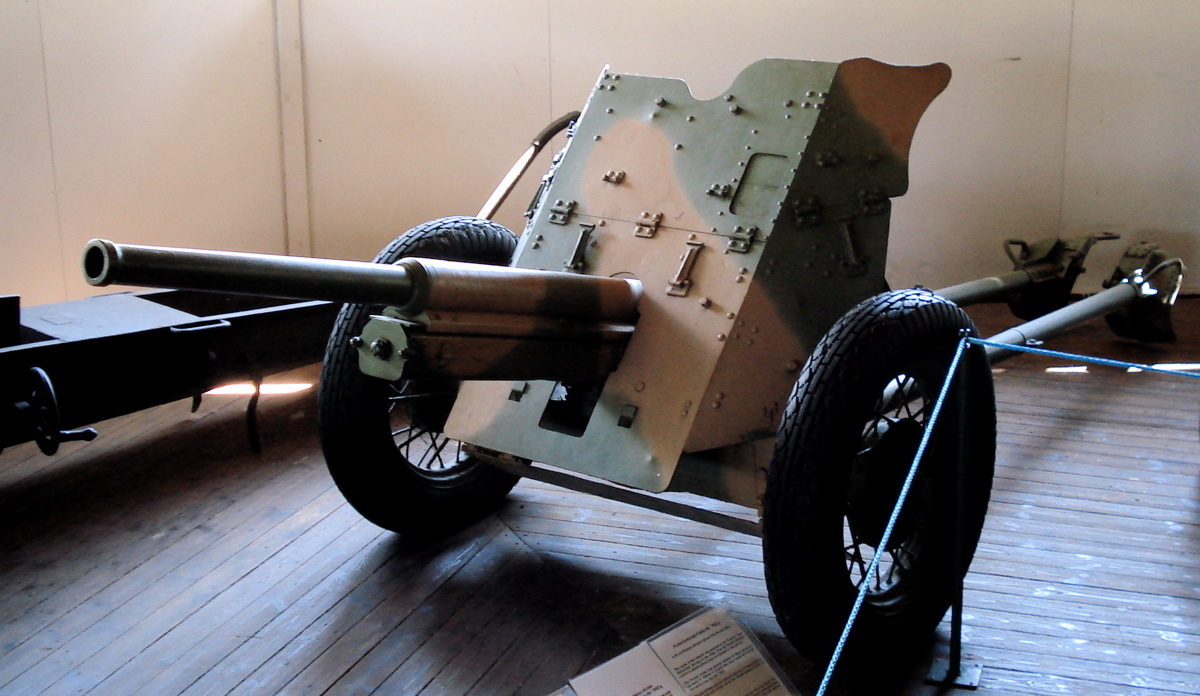
- 45 mm anti-tank gun M1932, displayed in Finnish Tank Museum in Parola.
- Type: Anti-tank gun
- Place of origin: USSR

Production history
- Produced: 1934–1937
- No. built: 21,564+
- Variants: 20-K tank gun 21-K AA gun

Specifications
- Mass: Horse drawn: 450 kg (990 lb); Motor: 510 kg (1,120 lb)
- Length: 6.4 m (21 ft 0 in)
- Barrel length: 2.07 m (6 ft 9 in) 46 calibers
- Shell: Fixed QF 45 x 310mm R
- Shell weight: 1.43 kilograms (3.2 lb)
- Caliber: 45 mm (1.8 in)
- Breech: Vertical sliding-wedge
- Recoil: Hydro-spring
- Carriage: Split-trail
- Elevation: -8° to 25°
- Traverse: 60°
- Rate of fire: 15 rpm
- Muzzle velocity: 760 m/s (2,500 ft/s) AP
- Maximum firing range: 4.4 km (2.7 mi)

The 45 mm anti-tank gun model 1932 (factory designation 19-K and GRAU index 52-P-243A) was a light quick-firing anti-tank gun used in the interwar period and in the first stage of the German-Soviet War. It was created by factory No. 8 which was located in now Korolyov city, under leadership of engineer V. Bering.

== History ==
The gun bearing factory designation 19-K (Cyrillic 19-К) was a combination of a modified carriage of the 37 mm anti-tank gun model 1930 (built according to a documentation bought from Rheinmetall) with a 45 mm barrel designed in March 1932. and adopted by the Red Army on March 23, 1932. The 45 mm caliber was selected because the large reserves of the French 47 mm shells could be converted to 45 mm by milling out the driving bands. The resulting light quarter-automatic anti-tank gun was discovered to be unsatisfactory due to low mobility and reliability problems, and after a series of modifications (including the arrest of the project's chief designer on August 10, 1933, after several production defects were uncovered), was re-sent to army trials 26 December 1933. The resulting semi-automatic improved version was known as "45 mm anti-tank gun M1934" (Russian: 45-мм противотанковая пушка образца 1934 года). These guns were deemed obsolete in 1937 and were replaced by the 45 mm anti-tank gun M1937 (53-K). The tank gun modification Russian: 45-мм танковая пушка образца 1932/38 годов (20-К) was still in use in the first stage of the German-Soviet War. M1932 guns captured by the Germans were given the designation 4.5 cm Pak 184(r).

The gun carriage was upgraded from wooden wheels to automobile GAZ-A pneumatic wheels in 1934, and in 1936 the wheels were upgraded with sponge tires, raising total mass of the gun to 560 kg. The evolution from the 19-K to the 53-K gun was rather gradual, with improvements incorporated in production lines several times.

=== Tank gun 20-K ===
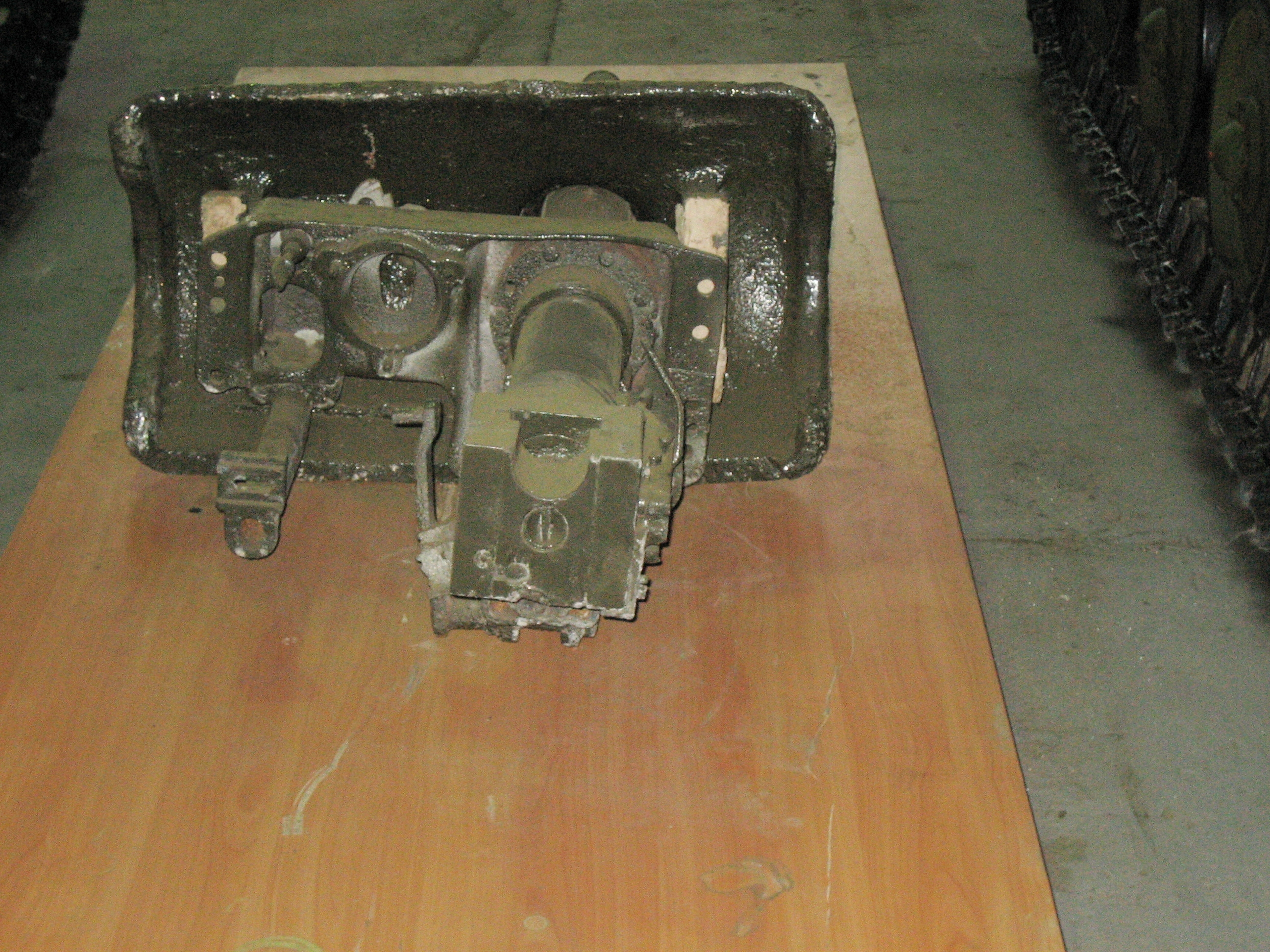
A 20-K tank gun.

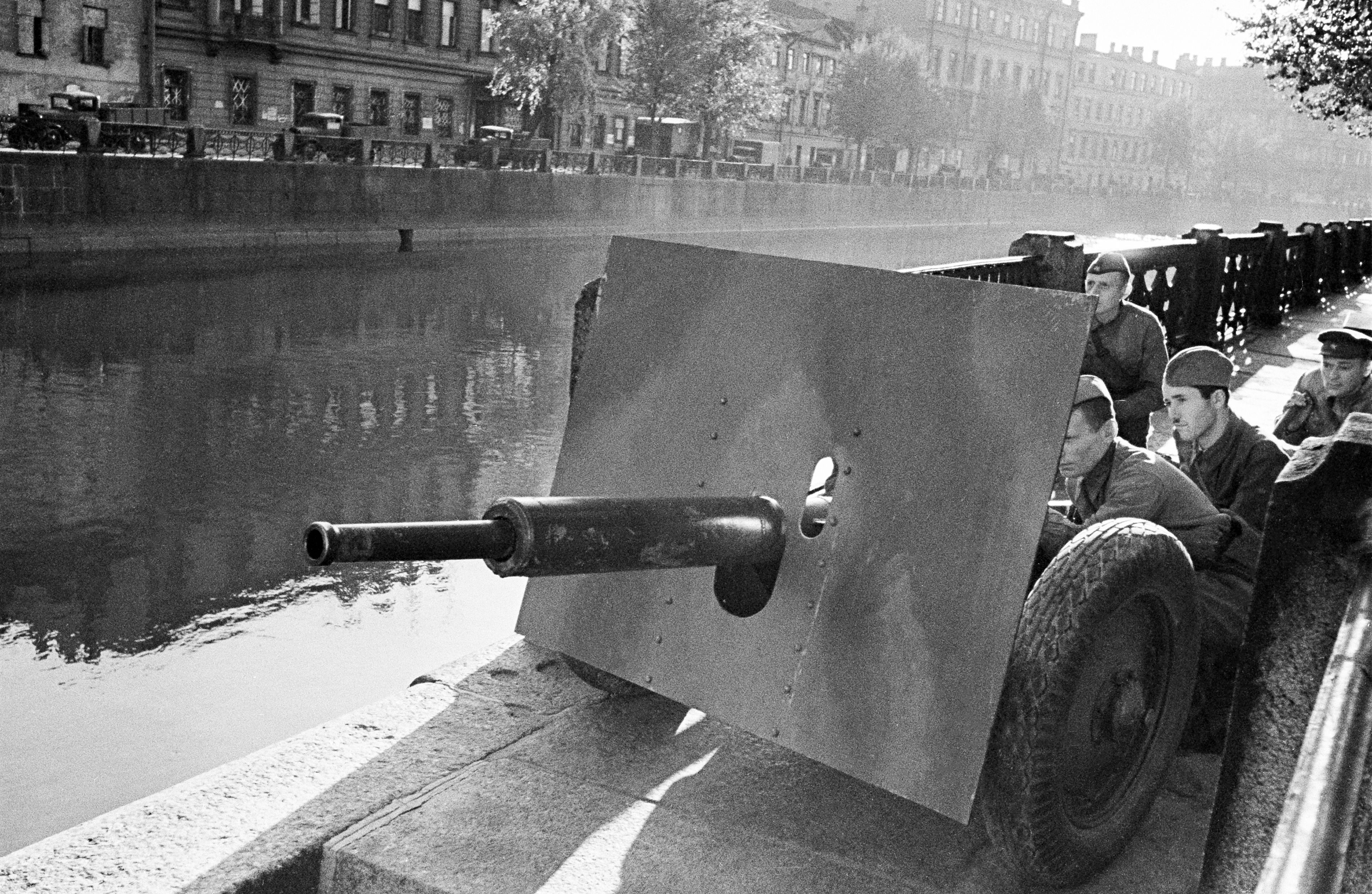
A 20-K tank gun converted to anti-tank use.

The gun was installed in tanks under the name 45 mm tank gun model 1932 (20-K). In 1934, the gun was improved with a semi-automatic breech instead of the original quarter-automatic version. Other changes were in the elevation mechanism and the recoil system. It was used on a wide variety of Soviet tanks and fired the same ammunition as the anti-tank version. The gun was later improved into the 45 mm tank gun model 1938, which had an electric firing system and a TOS stabilized (in vertical plane only) gun sight, allowing for accurate fire while the tank was in motion. The gyro stabilizer was removed from the design in 1941 due to inexperienced tank crews not activating the stabilizer. During 1941-42, some surplus M1938 barrels were fitted to trailer carriages to replace the losses of anti-tank guns suffered in the opening stages of Operation Barbarossa. Although the Russian designation for these guns is not known, the Germans gave captured guns the designation 4.5 cm Pak 184/6(r).

year	produced
1932	10
1933	2099
1934	2005
1935	2443
1936–40	15007
1941	2759
1942	5090
1943	3040

Tanks and armoured cars which mounted this gun include:

- BA-3
- BA-6
- BA-10
- BA-11
- T-26
- T-50 tank
- T-70
- T-80
- BT-5
- BT-7
- T-35
- BT-20 (A-20)
- KV-8
- SMK
- T-100

=== Anti-aircraft gun 21-K ===
Starting in 1934, the barrel of the 19-K was placed on a pedestal mount and used by the Soviet Navy as an anti-aircraft gun. It was not very effective in this role since it had to be loaded by hand, which kept its rate of fire down to about 25–30 rounds per minute, and its lack of a time fuze meant that it had to score a direct hit to damage its targets.

== Ammunition ==
Ammunition types:

- B-240/BR-240 - armor-piercing
- Armor-piercing chemical
- UBR-240P - armor-piercing composite rigid
- UBR-243P – sub-caliber armor-piercing
- UBR-243SP – armor piercing
- UBZR-243 – armor piercing incendiary
- UO-243 – fragmentation
- UssH-243 – shrapnel
- Smoke

== Performance ==
Calculated penetration
Type	100 m (110 yd)	500 m (550 yd)	1,000 m (1,100 yd)	1,500 m (1,600 yd)	2,000 m (2,200 yd)
APHE	61 mm (2.4 in)	46 mm (1.8 in)	32 mm (1.3 in)	22 mm (0.87 in)	15 mm (0.59 in)
APBC-HE	59 mm (2.3 in)	45 mm (1.8 in)	35 mm (1.4 in)	29 mm (1.1 in)	26 mm (1.0 in)
APCR	94 mm (3.7 in)	64 mm (2.5 in)	40 mm (1.6 in)		

== 45 mm anti-tank gun M1932 (19-K) in Ukraine ==
At least one 45 mm anti-tank gun M1932 (19-K) was sighted being used by Russian unit in Kursk during January 2025, captured on FPV drone footage by a Ukrainian drone team. The drone impacted the abandoned UAZ vehicle being used to pull the gun.
