= Sotka =

Sotka ("a hundred" in Slavic languages) may refer to:

- MR-UR-100 Sotka Soviet ballistic missile
- T-34 medium tank, nicknamed sotka in Finnish
- T-100 "Sotka", a Soviet heavy tank prototype considered while developing the Kliment Voroshilov tank
- Sukhoi T-4, a Soviet bomber aircraft
- An area (a metric unit of area, one hundredth of a hectare)
