= T-100 tank =

1930s Soviet heavy tank prototype

T-100
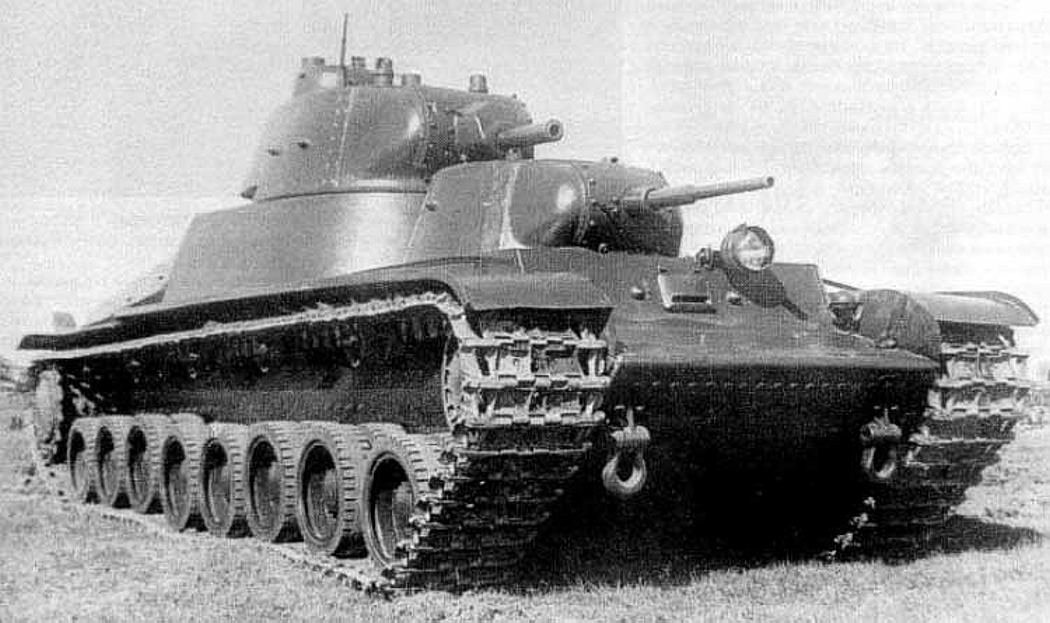
- The Soviet T-100 heavy tank being tested and documented.
- Type: Heavy tank
- Place of origin: Soviet Union

Service history
- Used by: Soviet Union
- Wars: World War II; Winter War

Production history
- Designer: N. Barykov's OKMO design team
- Manufacturer: S.M. Kirov Factory No. 185
- No. built: 2

Specifications
- Mass: 58 tonnes (57 long tons; 64 short tons)
- Length: 8.38 m (27 ft 6 in)
- Width: 3.4 m (11 ft 2 in)
- Height: 3.42 m (11 ft 3 in)
- Crew: 8
- Main armament: Main Turret: 76.2 mm L-11 gun (20 rounds); Front Turret: 45 mm 20-K gun (393 rounds)
- Secondary armament: 3× 7.62 mm DT machine guns
- Engine: Mikulin GAM-34BT, water cooled Petrol 4-stroke V-12; 800 hp (600 kW)
- Power/weight: 14 hp/t (10 kW/t)
- Suspension: Torsion bar
- Operational range: Road: 200 km (120 mi); Cross-country: 120 km (75 mi)
- Maximum speed: 35.7 km/h (22.2 mph)

The T-100 was a Soviet twin-turreted heavy tank prototype, designed in 1938–39 as a possible replacement for the T-35 heavy tank. The T-100 was designed by N. Barykov's OKMO design team at S.M. Kirov Factory No. 185 in Leningrad. The T-100 was originally conceived with three turrets and was eventually built with two. It was in competition with a similar design, the SMK, but neither was adopted and instead a single turret version of the SMK was ordered as the KV-1. All three prototypes were tested at the same time in the Battle of Summa during the Winter War with Finland.

== Development ==
The project was initiated by the Red Army's need to replace the aging five-turreted T-35 tank based on combat experience in the Spanish Civil War. One of the lessons the Red Army drew from this conflict was the need for heavy 'shell-proof' armor on medium and heavy tanks. Although the T-35 was never used in Spain, its thin armor was vulnerable to the small towed antitank guns and gun-armed tanks encountered there by Soviet T-26 and BT tanks.

The T-100 was in direct competition against the very similar SMK heavy tank, by Lt-Colonel Josef Kotin's team at the Leningrad Kirovsky Factory. The original specification was for a five-turreted "anti-tank gun destroyer" which would resist 37–45 mm guns at any range and 76.2 mm artillery at 1,200 m. Both design teams objected to the antiquated multi-turreted design and the requirement was reduced to two turrets before serious design work began. Both tanks had some modern features, including thick, welded armor, radios and torsion bar suspension (another feature insisted upon by the design teams).

== Description ==
The T-100 tank had two turrets one in front of the other requiring a long chassis. The front turret, mounting a 45 mm anti-tank gun had a limited area of fire due to the second turret behind. The second turret, mounting a 76.2 mm gun, was set higher on top of the superstructure than the first and so able to turn a full 360 degrees. The multi-turret concept, usually a mix of cannon and machine gun turrets, had been common in the 1920s, with the British one-off Vickers A1E1 Independent influencing the Soviet T-35.

== Service history ==
The prototype T-100 tank was briefly tested alongside the other designs during the Soviet invasion of Finland in 1939, but without success. It was never put into production, due to the archaic design concept, poor mobility and the availability of a far superior alternative, the KV series.

== Variants ==
- T-100Z – In January 1940, Army Commander G. Kulik ordered a T-100 tank to be equipped with a 152 mm M-10 howitzer in a rotating turret. The turret was ready by March of 1940, but it was never installed on the T-100. That project ended when the KV-1 and KV-2 were accepted for service. During the defense of Leningrad, the turret was used as a pillbox.
- SU-100Y – In an attempt to rush into use a mechanized large howitzer capable of dealing with Finnish bunkers, one of the T-100s was converted into the SU-100Y self-propelled gun. It did not go into production, and the prototype was shipped to Kazan in the fall of 1941 before the Battle of Moscow.
