= SMK tank =

Soviet heavy tank prototype of the 1930s

SMK
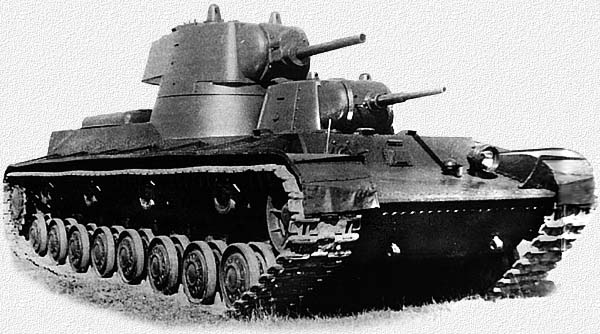
- The Soviet SMK heavy tank
- Type: Heavy tank
- Place of origin: Soviet Union

Service history
- In service: 1939 (prototype)
- Used by: Soviet Union
- Wars: Winter War

Production history
- Manufacturer: Kirov Plant
- Produced: 1939
- No. built: 1

Specifications
- Mass: 55 t (54 long tons)
- Length: 8.75 m (28 ft 8 in)
- Width: 3.36 m (11 ft 0 in)
- Height: 3.35 m (11 ft 0 in)
- Crew: 7
- Armor: 20-60 mm
- Main armament: 45 mm gun M1932 (forward turret), 76.2 mm gun L-11 (main, or rear-most turret)
- Secondary armament: 3×7.62 mm DT MG
- Engine: GAM-34BT; 850 hp
- Power/weight: 15.5 hp/t
- Suspension: Torsion bar
- Ground clearance: 0.5 m (1 ft 8 in)
- Fuel capacity: 1,320 l
- Operational range: 220 km (140 mi)
- Maximum speed: 35 km/h (22 mph)

The SMK was an armored vehicle prototype developed by the Soviet Union prior to the Second World War. It was named after Sergei Mironovich Kirov, a Communist Party official assassinated in 1934. The SMK was discovered and classified by German intelligence as the T-35C, leading to the misunderstanding that the T-35 took part in the Winter War.

Only one was built and after a trial showing the downsides of its weight and size against the KV tank and brief use in the war with Finland, the project was dropped.

== Design and development ==
The SMK was among the designs competing to replace the unreliable and expensive T-35 multi-turreted heavy tank. A design team under Josef Kotin at the Kirovski Works (formerly the Putilov Works) at Leningrad designed the tank. Competition came from the former OKMO designer N. Barykov at the Bolshevik Plant with their T-100 tank.

In spite of the lessons that could have been learned during the Spanish Civil War, the specification drawn up for the "Anti-Tank Gun Destroyer" in 1937 required the ability to withstand 45 mm anti-tank guns at point-blank range and 75 mm artillery fire at 1,200 m (1,300 yd).

Meetings in 1938 resulted in a reduction in the number of turrets in the specification and changes in suspension design (going from spring-based to torsion bar). Kotin and his assistant independently designed a single-turret version of the SMK, which gained Stalin's approval and was named the Kliment Voroshilov tank (KV). Production of two prototypes was ordered.

The SMK's armament was a short 76.2 mm gun in the upper, centrally placed turret and a 45 mm weapon in the forward turret.

== Service history ==
The SMK, the two KV-1 prototypes and the two T-100 prototypes were put through proving trials before being tested operationally in combat at the Battle of Summa during the Winter War against Finland. The vehicles formed a company of the 91st Tank Battalion of the 20th Heavy Tank Brigade. The unit was under the command of the son of the Defence Commissar. While the SMK had thick enough armor to protect the crew from Finnish cannons and machine guns, its extremely long hull made turning difficult, especially in the dense forests where the Winter War took place. After being immobilized by a mine, the SMK had to be abandoned and was not recovered for two months.

The KV-1 and KV-2 designs proved superior in both trials in Finland and were accepted.

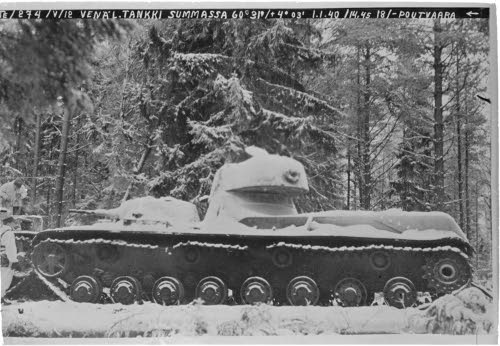
The sole prototype of the SMK abandoned in Finland during the Winter War

== Armor ==
Location	Front	Side	Rear	Top/bottom
Hull	60 mm at a 45° angle (nose) 40 mm at a 15° angle (glacis) 60 mm at a 55° angle (driver)	60 mm at a 75-90° angle	60 mm round (lower) 60 mm at a 60° angle 20 mm at a 15° angle (engine)	20–30 mm flat (bottom) 20 mm flat (top)
Upper Turret	60 mm at a 75° angle and round	60 mm at a 75° angle	60 mm at an 80° angle	20 mm at a 0-15° angle
Lower Turret	60 mm at a 75° angle and round	60 mm at a 75° angle	60 mm at an 80° angle	20 mm flat to a 15° angle

== See also ==
- List of tanks of the Soviet Union
