= Mikulin AM-34 =

Soviet mass-produced, liquid-cooled, aircraft engine

AM-34
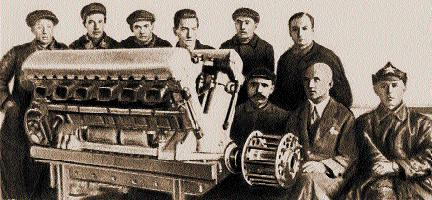
- Mikulin M-34, 1932
- Type: Liquid-cooled V12 engine
- National origin: Soviet Union
- Designer: Alexander Mikulin
- First run: 1931
- Major applications: Tupolev TB-3
- Manufactured: 1934–1943
- Number built: 10,538
- Developed into: Mikulin AM-35

The Mikulin AM-34 (M-34) was a Soviet mass-produced, liquid-cooled, aircraft engine of domestic design. Its initial development was troubled, but it eventually became one of the most successful Soviet aircraft engines of the 1930s. It was utilized on numerous aircraft, including the Beriev MBR-2, Tupolev TB-3, Tupolev TB-4, Tupolev ANT-20, Petlyakov Pe-8, Kalinin K-7, Polikarpov I-17, and Bolkhovitinov DB-A, as well as the G-5 class and various prototype motor torpedo boats. A version of the maritime model was adapted for use in several prototype heavy tanks in 1939, although none was placed into production.

== Design and development ==
Before World War II, the Soviet aeroengine industry was mainly engaged in producing foreign designs, notably Wright, Bristol, Hispano-Suiza, and Gnome-Rhône. Several engines of so-called original design were developed, although these were probably largely based on foreign models (e.g. Mikulin M-17, Shvetsov M-25, Klimov M-103, etc.). The M-34 was thought to have been originally designed in Italy by Fiat; it closely follows Italian inline aeroengine practice. (Note: Its origin remainsg in question; available evidence points to Italian origin, since the V2 adheres very closely to it but was recently discovered to be an original design by Mikulin.)

The M-34 began development in 1928 as a replacement for the Mikulin M-17, a license-built copy of the BMW VI. It had similar dimensions and attachment points, but was otherwise an entirely new design. It was a direct-drive, block-type engine with the cylinder block connected by long internal studs with centrally coupled articulated connecting rods. The development of the engine process was prolonged, with the engineering drawings not completed until April 1931. The first engine was delivered to TsIAM (Russian: Центральный институт авиационного моторостроения, romanized: Tsentralniy institut aviatsionnogo motorostroeniya, lit. 'Central Aviation Motors Institute') on 21 September 1931 for bench testing with imported carburetors and magnetos. It began state testing in November 1931, but failed. It was submitted again a year later with Soviet-designed K-34 carburetors, but was again rejected. It was resubmitted in January 1933, but again failed. It was flight-tested in a Tupolev TB-3 in October 1933.

Despite these failures it began production in 1932 at Factory No. 24 in Moscow, and 64 engines had been delivered by the end of the year. 790 were built the following year, and it was exhibited in Paris as an achievement of the Soviet aviation industry. The M-34 was redesignated with Alexsander Mikulin's initials as the AM-34 on 9 August 1936 in honor of his achievement.

The M-34 was used in an unusual system, first tried by Imperial Germany in 1918 with a Zeppelin-Staaken R.VI, that used a separate supercharger to supply pressurized air to the aircraft's M-34FRN engines. The first installation, designated ATsN-1 (agregat tsentral'nogo nadduva, 'central boosting unit'), used an auxiliary M-34 fitted inside the fuselage to drive a central supercharger with ducts leading to the engines in the wings. This was flight-tested in a Tupolev TB-3 in 1935. It was adapted for use in a Petlyakov Pe-8 bomber prototype with a smaller Klimov M-100 engine substituted for the M-34 as the ATsN-2. It was flight-tested during 1938–1939, but was not approved for production. The same idea was revived in 1943 by Nazi Germany with the Henschel Hs 130E bomber prototype series, with the Höhen-Zentrale Anlage unit.

Like the BMW VI and the Mikulin M-17, the AM-34FRN and subsequent models used articulated connecting rods which caused a different stroke of 190 mm (7.5 in) and 199 mm (7.8 in) between right and left cylinder bank. The displacement was 46.9 L (2,862.0 cu in). Combined with a number of other changes power significantly increased in most models to 1,200 metric horsepower (1,180 hp; 880 kW).

Development of a version for motor torpedo boats began in 1932 as the GM-34, but it did not pass its state tests until December 1934, although it was put into production that same year. It was given a reversing gear, a free-wheel sleeve, and its cooling and exhaust systems were modified. Production continued through 1943 with the GM-34s adapting features from the aviation models. With the exception of the GAM-34BP and the original GM-34, all maritime engines used a benzene-alcohol fuel mixture.

A version of the GM-34 was adapted for use in heavy tanks in 1939 as the GAM-34BT, although only small numbers were built. It was mounted in the prototypes of the T-100 and SMK heavy tanks and the SU-100Y self-propelled gun, none of which was put into production. The cooling system was modified with an external fan, and it was given new gearing. An electric starter was used rather than the original pneumatic one. It was rated at 850 PS (840 hp; 630 kW).

== Variants ==
Mikulin M-34 on display at the Polish Aviation Museum

M-34
First production version. Direct drive. Early engines used imported Zenith 90R carburetors, although later ones used indigenous K-34 carburetors. In production until the end of 1939. Rated at 800 PS (790 hp; 590 kW) with a weight of 608 kg (1,340 lb).
Coupled M-34
Two engines driving one propeller, project for the Kalinin K-7, no production.
M-34F
Small batch built in 1933 with a rating at 830 PS (820 hp; 610 kW).
M-34R
R for reduktor, 'reduction gear'. Rated at 800 PS (790 hp; 590 kW) with a weight of 670 kg (1,480 lb). Passed its state trials in May 1933 and in production from the end of that year to the end of 1939.
M-34RD
D for dal'niy, 'long-range'. Ten engines built with special attention to quality, smaller tolerances, and K-34RD carburetors to equip the Tupolev ANT-25 record-breaking aircraft. RPMs were boosted to give a power of 830 PS (820 hp). Later fifty more were built to power Tupolev TB-3 bombers converted to VIP transports.
M-34N
N for nagnetatel', 'supercharged'. Development began in 1931 of this direct-drive model, but the first two-stage supercharger design proved to be quite unreliable. A single-speed replacement was developed at TsIAM and tested in November 1933 and production began in September 1934. The centrifugal type supercharger was designed as a removable module and could be installed on other versions of the M-34. Rated at 820 PS (810 hp; 600 kW). A PTK steam-powered supercharger was developed and tested from 1938 to 1940, but was not accepted for production.
M-34RN
This geared model used the same geared centrifugal supercharger (GCS) as the M-34N and had the same rating. It failed state testing in September 1934 when the pistons burned through.
M-34NA
A version of the M-34N with minor changes to some components to extend service life. It had the same power as the original model.
M-34RA
A version of the M-34R with the same changes and power as the M-34NA.
M-34RNA
A version of the M-34RN with all the changes introduced on the NA and RA models. Same power as before, but weighed 748 kg (1,649 lb). Flight-tested on a TB-3 in May 1935 and production began at the end of the year.
M-34NB
The NA fitted with a strengthened crankcase, a lightened crankshaft with a modified nose and a refined supercharger. The power remained the same, but the weight dropped to 638 kg (1,407 lb). A TK-1 turbocharger was tested with the prototype on a Polikarpov R-Z in 1936.
M-34RNB
A geared equivalent of the NB model with a lightened reduction gear. The power remained the same, but the weight dropped to 725 kg (1,598 lb). In production from October 1935 until the end of 1939.
M-34P
P for pushechny, 'cannon'. A version of the M-34RN adapted to mount an autocannon in the V between the cylinder banks that fired through a hollow gear shaft. The specification was issued in August 1934, but no further information is known.
M-34NV
NV for neposredstvenny vprysk, 'fuel-injected'. It passed its bench tests in 1935 and was flight-tested in 1937, but was not accepted for production. Rated at 985 PS (972 hp; 724 kW).
M-34RNV
Geared version similar to the NV.
AM-34RNV-TK
Prototype built in 1938, similar to the RNV with the addition of a TK-1 turbocharger. Rated at 850 PS (840 hp; 630 kW) and an estimated weight of 810 kg (1,790 lb).
AM-34RS
Prototype built in 1938 with mixed cooling; air-cooled sleeves, and ethylene glycol-cooled cylinder heads. Rated at 1,200 PS (1,180 hp; 880 kW).
AM-34NF
Prototype with a geared centrifugal supercharger and a TK-1 supercharger. Flight-tested in a TB-3. Compression ratio of 6.6:1 and rated at 985 PS (972 hp; 724 kW).
M-34N2B
A prototype with a supercharger, two turbochargers, and four K-4 carburetors. Rated at 1,030 PS (1,020 hp; 760 kW).
AM-34FRN
F for forsirovanny, 'boosted'. Development began in 1934, but development was not completed until 1938. The crankshaft, crank case, gearing, and the side joints of the connecting rods were reinforced. The lubrication system was modified, the supercharger improved, and a new gas-distribution system was fitted. The carburetors were moved to behind the supercharger. Rated at 1,200 PS (1,180 hp; 880 kW) and the weight dropped to 690 kg (1,520 lb). It was exhibited in the 1937 Paris Air Show.
AM-34FRNA
First main production version of the FRN model. Equipped with four carburetors.
AM-34FRNB
Next production model of the FRN. Equipped with six carburetors. A small batch was adapted for the ATsN-2 system with pressurized air provided by an external supercharger and flight-tested in a Pe-8 in 1938–1939.
AM-34FRNV
The last main production variant of the AM-34. Built during 1938–1939. The crankcase was modified and bronze bushings were used for the main supports. It had a longer crankshaft nose, four K-4 carburetors, and a modified lubrication system. The valve castings were made of magnesium alloy. The power remained the same, but the weight increased to 763.5 kg (1,683 lb). Variants with fuel injection and two TK-1 turbochargers were tested, but not put into production.
AM-34RB
Superchargers were removed from AM-34RNB engines during 1938–1939 to create this model.

=== Maritime variants ===
GM-34
Intended for motor torpedo boats. Rated at 800 PS (790 hp; 590 kW) with a weight of 864 kg (1,905 lb).
GAM-34F
A boosted version of the GM-34 it had bronze main bushings and used the crankshaft, block, heads, and some other components of the AM-34FRNV aircraft engine. Rated at 1,000 PS (990 hp; 740 kW) with a weight of 1,080 kg (2,380 lb) with a compression ratio of 7.3:1.
GAM-34FN
A version of the GAM-34F with a FN-25 geared centrifugal supercharger and one K-4 carburetor. It used the oil system of the GAM-34BS and was in production from August 1939.
GAM-34BP
Intended for armored river boats.
GAM-34BS
An improved version of the GAM-34BP. Rated at 850 PS (840 hp; 630 kW) with a weight of 1,045 kg (2,304 lb).

== Applications ==
=== Aviation ===
- Beriev MBR-2
- Bolkhovitinov DB-A
- Kalinin K-7
- Petlyakov Pe-8
- Polikarpov I-17
- Tupolev ANT-20
- Tupolev ANT-25
- Tupolev TB-3
- Tupolev TB-4

=== Maritime ===
- G-5-class motor torpedo boat
- G-6-class motor torpedo boat
- G-8-class motor torpedo boat
- SM-4-class motor torpedo boat
- Project 1124 armored river boat
- Project 1125 armored river boat

=== Tanks ===
- T-100
- SMK
- SU-100Y

== Specifications (AM-34R) ==
Data from Kotelnikov (2005, p. 102)

=== General characteristics ===
- Type: 60° V12 aircraft engine
- Bore: 160 mm (6.30 in)
- Stroke: 190 and 199 mm (7.48 and 7.83 in) different between right and left cylinder bank due to articulated connecting rods
- Displacement: 46.9 L (2,862 cu in)
- Dry weight: 670 kg (1,480 lb)

=== Components ===
- Fuel system: Carburetor
- Cooling system: Water-cooled

=== Performance ===
- Power output: 800 PS (790 hp; 590 kW)
- Specific power: 13.42 kW/L (0.29 hp/cu in)
- Compression ratio: 6.0:1
- Power-to-weight ratio: 0.92 kW/kg (0.56 hp/lb)

== See also ==
Related development

- Mikulin AM-35

Related lists

- List of aircraft engines
