= BA-11 =

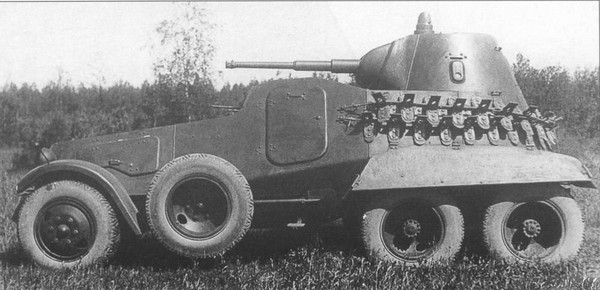
- BA-11D
- Type: Armored car
- Place of origin: Soviet Union

Service history
- Used by: Soviet Union

Production history
- No. built: 17

Specifications
- Mass: 8.13–8.65 tonnes
- Length: 5.3 m
- Width: 2.5 m
- Height: 2.4 m
- Crew: 4
- Armor: 13 mm
- Main armament: 45 mm gun 20-K
- Secondary armament: 2×7.62 DT machine gun
- Engine: petrol ZIS-16 or diesel ZIS-D-7; 90 hp (67 kW)
- Suspension: wheeled
- Maximum speed: BA-11: 62 km/h (39 mph); BA-11D: 49 km/h (30 mph)

The BA-11 or Broneavtomobil 11 (Russian: БА-11 or Бронеавтомобиль 11) was an armored car developed in the Soviet Union. It was intended to replace the BA-10, but production was prevented by the Nazi German invasion of 1941. The BA-11 was a heavy armored car based on a strengthened ZiS-6K chassis. Used during 1941–1942 on the Leningrad front, it was designed to attack infantry, cavalry, and medium armored cars.

With 13mm of frontal armour, it was only slightly less protected than the most common Soviet light tank of the era, the T-26, which had 15mm of armour. It had very poor off-road mobility due to being overloaded and lacking all-wheel drive, which was compensated by tracks that could be attached to the rear wheels. Only 17 were built and all of them were lost in 1941–42. One BA-11 was modified with a ZiS D-7 96hp diesel engine and designated as a BA-11D. Trials were successful, but the overall lack of serviceability of the BA-11 removed the necessity of a BA-11D serial production.
