= OKMO =

Soviet tank design bureau of the 1930s

OKMO (Opytniy Konstruktorsko-Mekhanicheskiy Otdel, 'Experimental Design Mechanical Department') was the tank design team in the Soviet Union during the early 1930s. Located in Leningrad, it produced the design of the T-26 infantry tank, of which about 12,000 would be produced. Most other designs from the bureau never saw the light of day, but it was here that Mikhail Koshkin, designer of the famous T-34 medium tank, gained his early experience. The bureau was gutted in the Great Purge and broken up by the beginning of the Second World War.

== History ==
=== Organizational ===
In 1930 the Bolshevik Factory No. 232 became home to the AVO-5 tank design bureau, soon renamed OKMO. In 1932, the tank department of the Bolshevik factory, became the new Factory No. 174 (K.E. Voroshilov). This new, independent enterprise was dedicated to the mass production of T-26 tank.

Janusz Magnuski says that in 1932 one of the former departments of the Bolshevik factory became a base for the new independent entity, named in 1935 as Factory No. 185 (S.M. Kirov), under the direction of N. Barykov and Semyon Alexandrovich Ginzburg. The OKMO, for a few months a part of Factory No. 174, moved at the same time to Factory No. 185. The new enterprise was also dedicated to the production of tanks, while the main part of Bolshevik Factory remained focused on production of heavy artillery. Because of the same honorific and the same city of location, the Factory No. 185 is often mistaken in Western sources with Kirov Plant (or Factory No. 100), notably in Sewell's "Why Three Tanks?" and works of Steven Zaloga. They were independent factories; the Factory No. 185 was a home of OKMO bureau (Ginzburg), while the larger Factory No. 100 was a home of SKB-2 (Kotin, known for KV line of heavy tanks). In 1941, because of German threat, parts of both factories were moved to Chelyabinsk, where the large complex was given the name Chelyabinsk Kirov Plant No. 100 (unofficially named "Tankograd"), and continued the production of Kotin's design line.

=== Design ===
In 1930, bureau oversaw design changes to the British Vickers E tank for construction as the T-26 light infantry tank, and later improvements to the T-26.

In 1930 OKMO also began design studies for heavy tanks. A team led by German engineer Eduard Grote worked on a 100-ton design with 107 mm gun, four sub-turrets, and pneumatic suspension and servo-controls, called the T-41 or TG-5. A slightly more practical "land battleship" was the T-35 heavy tank, designed by N. Tseits's team and inspired by the British Vickers Independent.

In 1934, OKMO designed the T-43-2, a design for an amphibious tank with convertible drive—being able to run on tracks or wheels—as a possible replacement for the T-37 amphibious scout tank. It, and Moscow Factory no. 37's competing T-43-1 were both rejected in favour of continuing T-37 production.

Also in 1934, N. Barykov and N. Tseits worked with graduate students from the Leningrad Technical Institute to modernize the multi-turreted T-28 medium tank by adding a Christie suspension. The resulting T-29-5 adopted the wheel-and-track running gear from the BT fast tank. Further T-29-4 and T-29-1 prototypes were built in 1935, but in testing at the NIIBT in Kubinka none of these were found satisfactory. Following Soviet armoured experience in Spain, another version was built with thicker armour and a better gun—it was considered for the A-20/T-32 competition which led to the famous T-34 medium tank, but by this time was obviously outdated. (One of the Leningrad engineering students had been Mikhail Koshkin, the T-34's chief designer)

In the 1930s, OKMO also designed a number of self-propelled artillery and antiaircraft guns, and tracked infantry, ammunition and fuel transporters, but only prototypes or trial batches of any were ever built, except for the T-26-T artillery tractor.

In 1936–37 OKMO designed the T-111 (or T-46-5), the first attempt at a Soviet tank with "shell-proof" armour, effective against more than just small arms. The engine and gun were inadequate, and only a prototype was built.

The T-100 'Sotka' was a two-turreted heavy tank prototype. It became rejected in favour of the KV-1 heavy tank. A second prototype was made as a single self-propelled gun T-100Y, later designated SU-100Y, presently displayed in Kubinka Tank Museum. The bureau started work on the T-50 infantry tank in 1939, but was gutted during the Great Purge. The T-50 was handed over to the Factory No. 174.

== See also ==
- Soviet tank factories
