= KV-13 =

Soviet experimental medium tank

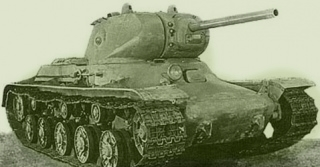
- KV-13
- Type: medium tank
- Place of origin: Soviet Union

Service history
- Used by: Soviet Union

Production history
- Designer: SKB-2
- Designed: 1941–1942
- Manufacturer: Chelyabinsk Kirov Plant
- Produced: 1942
- No. built: 3

Specifications
- Mass: 32 metric tons
- Length: 6.65 m (21 ft 10 in) with gun forward
- Width: 2.8 m (9 ft 2 in)
- Height: 2.5 m (8 ft 2 in)
- Crew: 4
- Armor: 120 mm maximum
- Main armament: 76 mm M1941 ZiS-5 gun
- Secondary armament: 1 × 7.62-mm DT-29 machine gun
- Engine: Kharkiv V-2 V12, liquid-cooled diesel engine 600 hp (450 kW)
- Power/weight: 18.8 hp/t (14.0 kW/t)
- Suspension: Torsion bar suspension
- Ground clearance: 450 mm (18 in)
- Operational range: 320 km (200 miles)
- Maximum speed: 65 km/h (40 mph)

The KV-13 (Russian: KB-13) was an experimental Soviet medium tank created during World War II. It was developed on the KV-1 chassis in the SKB-2 design bureau of the Chelyabinsk Kirov Plant in late 1941 – early 1942, as a "universal" tank, intended to replace the production of T-34 medium tanks and KV-1 heavy tanks at the same time.

== Development ==
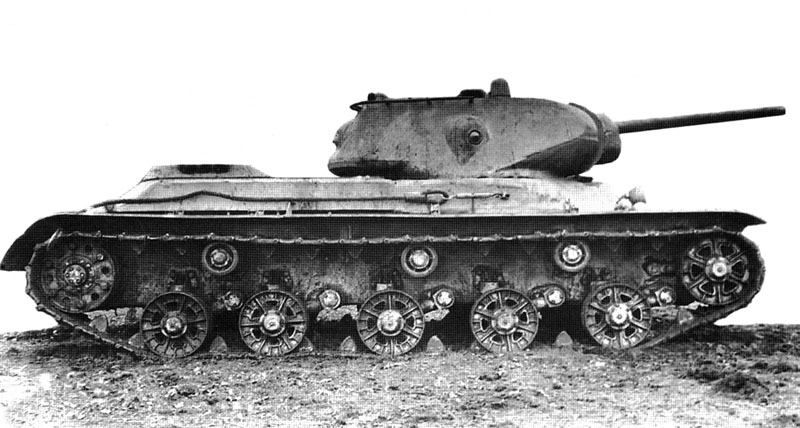
KV-13 on trials, 1942

The first prototype of the KV-13 was made in the spring of 1942, but in the fall of that year tests showed a lack of mechanical reliability and demonstrated the need to strengthen the vehicle's armour and to equip it with the new three-seat turret. While production of two modified prototypes incorporating these modifications began in December 1942, work on the KV-13 as a medium tank was discontinued in favour of continuing the production of the T-34. The further development of the project using two modified KV-13 prototypes led to the creation in 1943 of the IS-1 heavy tank. This tank was never used in combat.

== Bibliography ==
- А. Г. Солянкин; М. В. Павлов; И. В. Павлов; И. Г. Желтов (2005). Отечественные бронированные машины. XX век. 1941–1945. Москва: Эксприн. ISBN 5-94038-074-3.
- Свирин, М. Н.; Броневой щит Сталина. МИстория советского танка 1937–1943. Moscow: Яуза, Эксмо. ISBN 5-699-16243-7.
- Zaloga, Steven J. (2011). IS-2 Heavy Tank 1944–1973. New Vanguard. Oxford, UK: Osprey Publishing. ISBN 978-1-85532-396-4.
- Zaloga, Steven J. (2013). KV-1 & 2 Heavy Tanks 1939–1945. New Vanguard. Oxford, UK: Osprey Publishing. ISBN 978-1-4728-0321-4.
