= BT-5 =

Soviet light tank used in the 1930s and WWII

BT-5 light tank
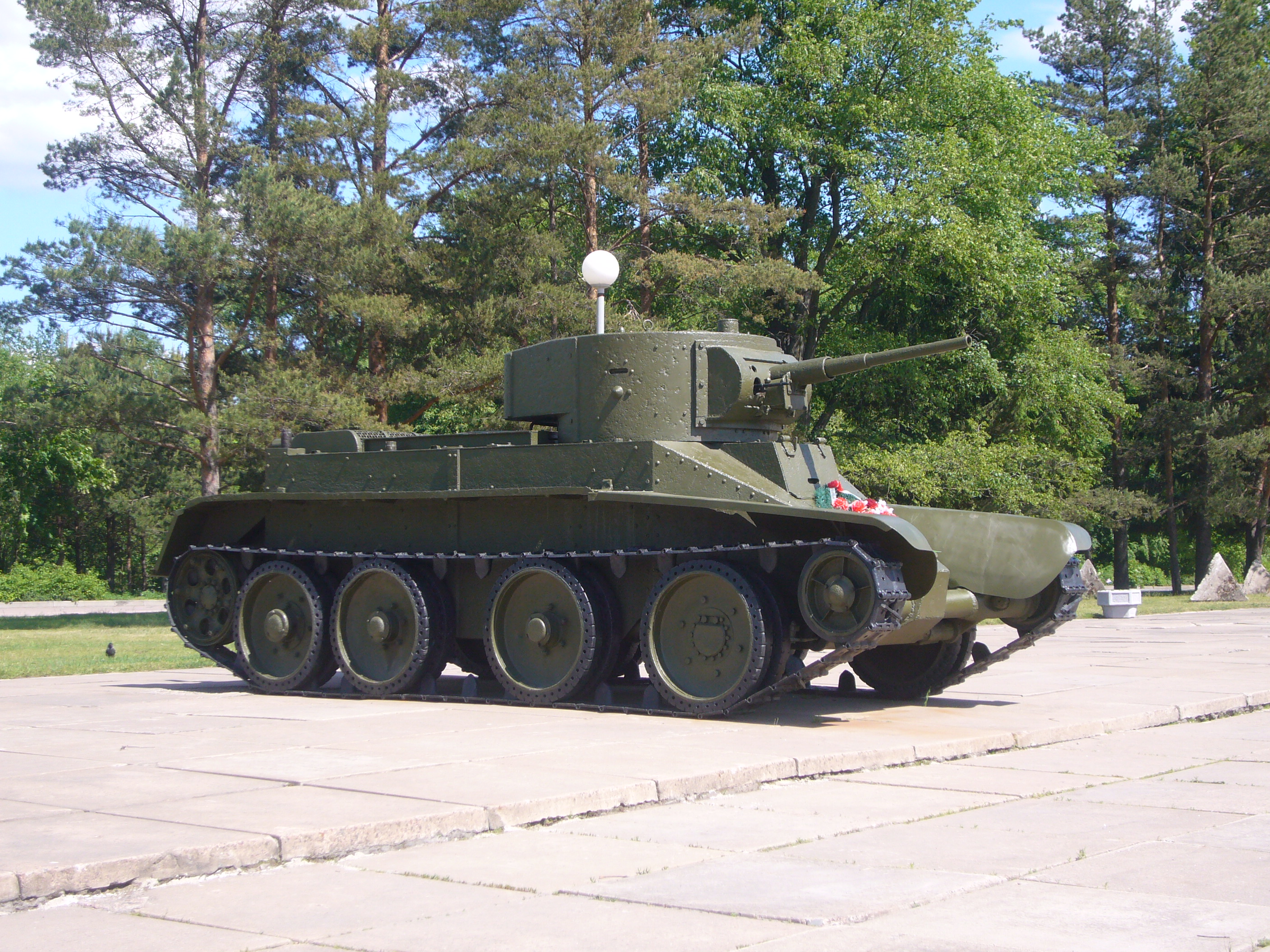
- A surviving BT-5 at the Breakthrough of the Siege of Leningrad Museum
- Type: Light tank
- Place of origin: Soviet Union

Service history
- In service: 1933-1945
- Used by: Soviet Union; Spanish Republic; Republic of China; Finland (captured); Francoist Spain (captured)
- Wars: Spanish Civil War; Second Sino–Japanese War; Soviet–Japanese border conflicts Invasion of Poland; Winter War; World War II; Continuation War

Production history
- Designer: J. Walter Christie, Kharkiv Morozov Machine Building Design Bureau (KMDB)
- Designed: 1930-1931
- Manufacturer: Malyshev Factory
- Produced: 1933-1935
- No. built: 1804-2108

Specifications
- Mass: 11.5 t
- Length: 5.58 m
- Width: 2.23 m
- Height: 2.25 m
- Crew: 3 commander/gunner loader and driver
- Armor: 6-13 mm
- Main armament: 45 mm 20-K cannon
- Secondary armament: Coaxial 7.62mm DT machine gun
- Engine: M-5; 400 hp
- Power/weight: 35hp/t
- Suspension: Christie
- Fuel capacity: 360 L gasoline
- Maximum speed: 72 km/h (45 mph)

The BT-5 ("Bystrohodnyi tank" or "Fast Tank type 5") was the second tank in the Soviet BT series of tanks. The BT-5 improved on the previous BT-2, such as a new turret fitted with a 45 mm anti-tank gun that was also used on the T-26 and the BT-5's younger brother, the BT-7. The BT-5 would enter service with the Red Army in 1933, first seeing action with the Second Spanish Republic in the Spanish Civil War in 1937 and serving until the end of World War II. Between 1884 and 2108 units were produced, with production of the tank beginning in March 1933 and ending in 1935.

== Design ==
The BT-5 had no armor improvements over the BT-2, with its thickest armor being 13 mm at its thickest and the thinnest being 6 mm thick. The suspension was a Christie suspension, which could have the tracks taken off to have road-wheels to use on the road. To turn the tank without the tracks, the driver had a steering wheel that turned the first wheel on each side. It took about a half hour to take off the tracks. The origins of the Christie suspension came from American racecar designer J. Walter Christie. When he failed to get the United States Army interested, he sold the design to the USSR. Due to American sanctions on the USSR, Christie sold the design as tractors. The armaments of the BT-5 were the 45 mm anti-tank gun M1932 (19-K) cannon and one coaxial 7.62 mm DP machine gun, with 115 rounds of ammunition for the main cannon. The BT-5 had a crew of three: a commander/gunner, a loader, and a driver. Both the commander/gunner and loader sat in the turret, and the driver sat in the front of the hull. The turret was a cylinder shape and some tanks had radio antennas around the turret. The ammunition was stored in the turret and under the commander/gunner, and loader. The BT-5 had a newly developed M-5 engine as its source of power. The fuel tank could hold 360 liters of fuel, and the BT-5 had an operational range of 200 kilometers. The BT-5 had a maximum speed of 72 kilometers per hour, or 45 miles per hour, on flat roads. The BT-5 had a 400-horsepower M-5 engine and a power-weight ratio of 35 horsepower per tonne. The BT-5 was 5.58 meters long 2.23 meters wide 2.25 meters tall and weighed 11.5 tonnes and the hull was riveted together with the front part shaped like a truncated pyramid.

== Combat History ==
The first conflict the BT-5 saw was the Spanish Civil War, where 100 BT-5s saw action with the Second Spanish Republic. Francoist Spain would also use some that were captured during the war. The next conflict the BT-5 saw was the Soviet-Japanese Border Conflict against the Empire of Japan. The BT-5 played a major role in the Battle of Khalkin Gol, as they were so fast that Japanese anti-tank gunners could not hit them. But the BT-5 was vulnerable at close range to Japanese soldiers with Molotov cocktails. The tank was praised post-battle reports after the conflict at Khalkin Gol.

The next time the BT-5 saw combat was the joint Soviet-German Invasion of Poland, where they did not see very much action. The first real challenge for the BT-5 was the Winter War against Finland, where the BT-5 was unable to get past the Finnish defensive line, the Mannerheim Line, where their thin armor was easily penetrated by Finnish anti-tank guns. The Soviets lost many BT-5s during this conflict. Finnish soldiers used Molotov cocktails and threw them at a weak point near the engine, which, when hit, would cause the engine to catch fire and explode. Soviet divisions would be surrounded by Finnish units and as fuel and spare parts began to run out the Soviets would use the tanks as makeshift bunkers by burying them up to their turrets. The Finnish Army would often capture many BT-5's in this condition, but even if the tanks were still operable, the Finns were unable to tow them due to a lack of vehicles able to tow the tanks, so they would salvage the tanks for anything useful such as the DP machine guns. By the end of the Winter War, Finland did not have a single complete BT-5.

After the Winter War, there were still hundreds of BT-5s in service, but many were replaced with the BT-7 and other tanks. On June 22, 1941, Nazi Germany launched Operation Barbarossa, the invasion of the Soviet Union, which caught the Soviets off guard. Soviet losses, including tanks, were appalling at the beginning of the invasion. The BT-5 would be used throughout the rest of the war, but not as much as its younger brother, the BT-7, or the new T-34, due to a lack of spare parts for the tank. The BT-5 was used the most at the beginning of the invasion of the Soviet Union and near the end of the war when spare parts were available.

== In Spanish service ==
About 50 BT-5s were used by the Second Spanish Republic in the Spanish Civil War. The crew of these BT-5s were members of the International Brigades that were trained in the Soviet Union by Soviet tankers. The tanks first saw action in the Zaragoza Offensive on October 13, 1937. 13 tanks were lost and 12 more were later lost between December 1937 and February 1938 at the Battle of Teruel. A few BT-5s were captured by Francoist Spain and used against the Second Spanish Republic.

== In Finnish service ==
Finland used many BT-5's along with other tanks they captured during the Winter War and the Continuation War. The Finnish Army mainly used them in a defensive role as they were mainly on the defense during the Winter War.
