= KV tank family =

WWII Soviet heavy tank

KV-1
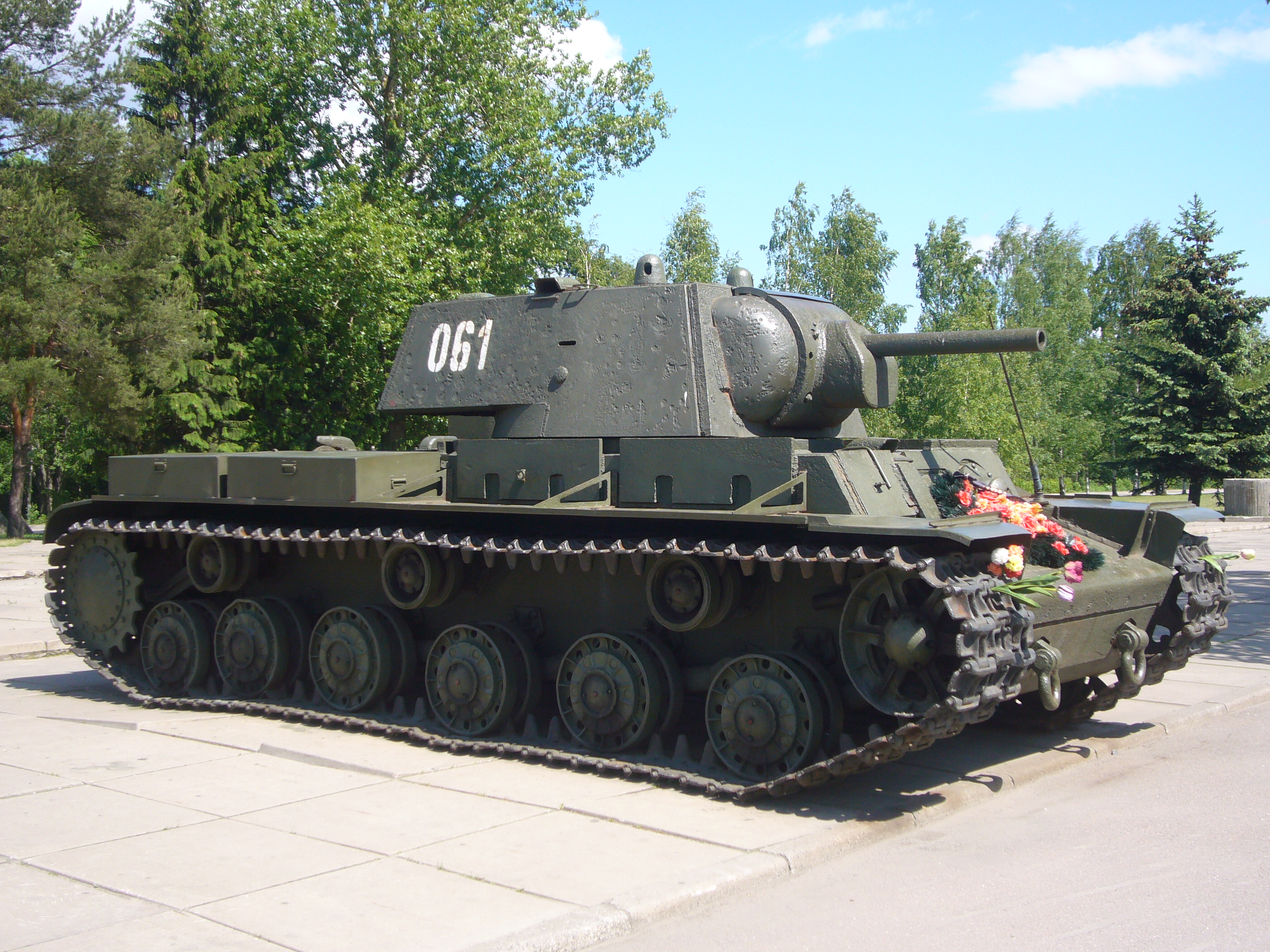
- KV-1 on display in Kirovsk
- Type: Heavy tank
- Place of origin: Soviet Union

Service history
- In service: 1939–1945
- Used by: Poland, Soviet Union, Finland (captured)
- Wars: Winter War, World War II

Production history
- Designer: Zhozef Kotin, TsKB-2
- Designed: 1938–1939
- Manufacturer: Kirov Factory, ChTZ
- Produced: 1939–1943
- No. built: 5,219 (Note: Including variants and prototypes.)
- Variants: KV-2, KV-8 flamethrower, KV-1S, KV-85, KV-122

Specifications (KV-1 Model 1941)
- Mass: 45 t (44 long tons; 50 short tons)
- Length: 6.75 m (22 ft 2 in)
- Width: 3.32 m (10 ft 11 in)
- Height: 2.71 m (8 ft 11 in)
- Crew: 5
- Armour: Front: 90 mm (3.5 in) (Note: Maximum armour thickness.); Side: 75 mm (3.0 in); Rear: 70 mm (2.8 in)
- Main armament: 76.2 mm M1941 ZiS-5 gun
- Secondary armament: 3 or 4 × DT machine guns
- Engine: V-2K V12 diesel engine 600 hp (450 kW)
- Power/weight: 13 hp/t
- Suspension: Torsion bar
- Operational range: Road: 250 km (160 mi); Cross-country: 150 km (93 mi)
- Maximum speed: 35 km/h (22 mph)

KV-2
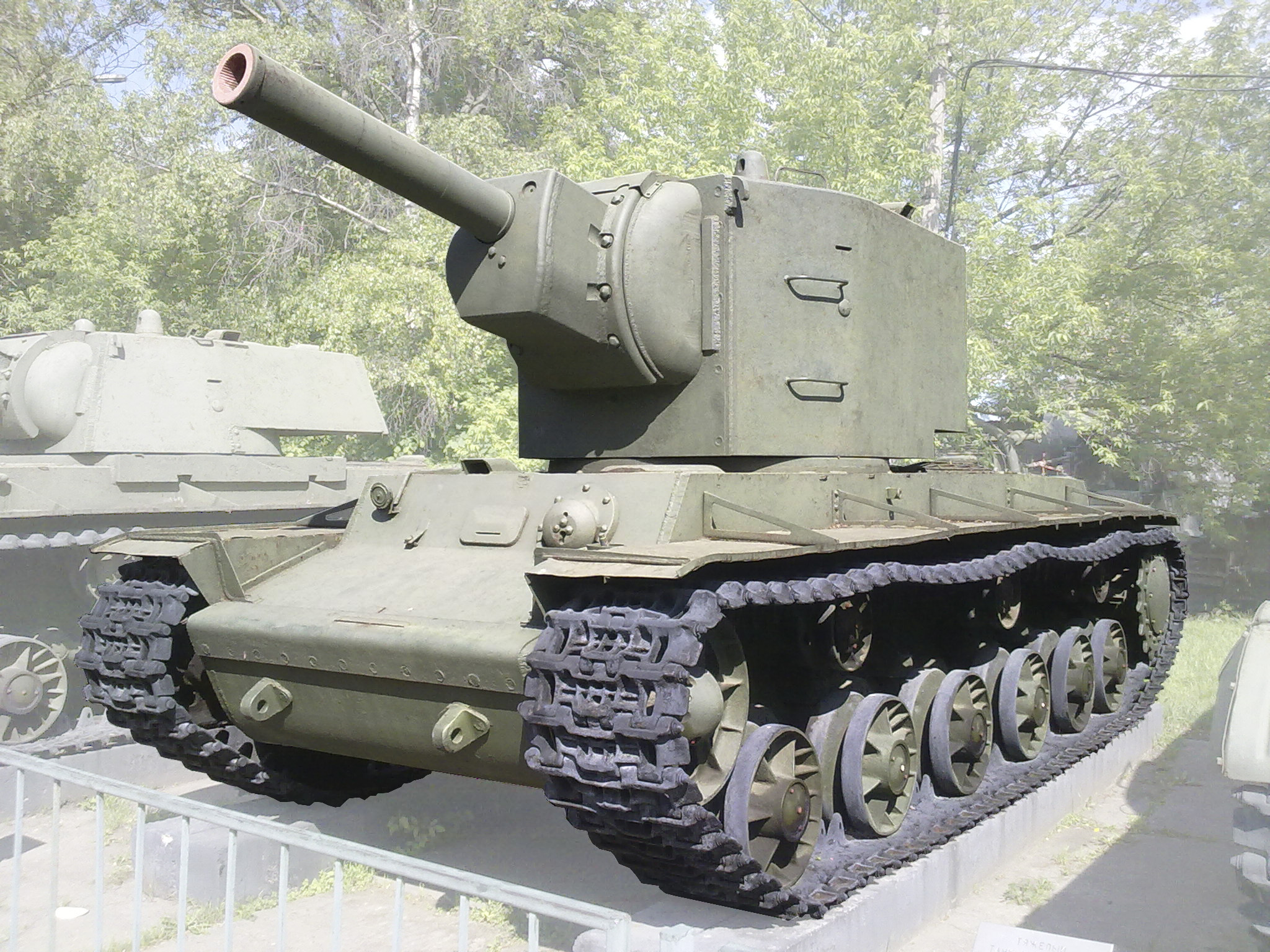
- KV-2 in Central Armed Forces Museum with KV-1 in background
- Type: Heavy tank/assault gun
- Place of origin: Soviet Union

Service history
- In service: 1940–1945
- Used by: Soviet Union
- Wars: World War II

Production history
- Designer: Zh. Kotin, TsKB-2
- Designed: 1938–1939
- Manufacturer: Kirov Factory, ChTZ
- No. built: 210

Specifications
- Mass: 52 t (51 long tons; 57 short tons)
- Length: 6.67 m (21 ft 11 in)
- Width: 3.35 m (11 ft 0 in)
- Height: 3.25 m (10 ft 8 in)
- Crew: 6
- Armour: 60–110 mm (2.4–4.3 in)
- Main armament: 152 mm M-10T howitzer (20 rounds)
- Secondary armament: 2 × DT machine guns (2,079 rounds)
- Engine: V-2K V12 diesel engine 600 hp (450 kW)
- Power/weight: 11.5 hp/t
- Operational range: Road: 225 km (140 mi); Cross-country: 150 km (93 mi)
- Maximum speed: 28 km/h (17 mph)

The KV (Russian: KB) tanks are a series of Soviet heavy tanks named after the Soviet defence commissar and politician Kliment Voroshilov (Климент Ворошилов) who operated with the Red Army during World War II. The KV tanks were known for their heavy armour protection during the early stages of the war, especially during the first year of the German invasion of the Soviet Union. In certain situations, even a single KV-1 or KV-2 supported by infantry could halt German formations. The German Wehrmacht at that time rarely deployed its tanks against KVs, as their own armament was too poor to deal with the "Russischer Koloss" – "Russian Colossus".

The KV tanks were practically immune to the 3.7 cm KwK 36 and howitzer-like, short-barreled 7.5 cm KwK 37 guns mounted, respectively, on the early Panzer III and Panzer IV tanks fielded by the invading German forces. Until the Germans developed more effective guns, the KV-1 was invulnerable to almost any German weapon except the 8.8 cm Flak gun.

Prior to the start of Operation Barbarossa in June 1941, about 500 of the over 22,000 tanks then in Soviet service were of the KV-1 type. As the war progressed, it became evident that there was little sense in producing the expensive KV tanks, as the T-34 medium tank performed better (or at least equally well) in all practical respects. In fact the only advantage the KV had over the T-34/76 was its larger and roomier three-man turret. Later in the war, the KV series became a base for the development of the IS (Iosif Stalin) series of tanks and self-propelled guns.

== Development history ==
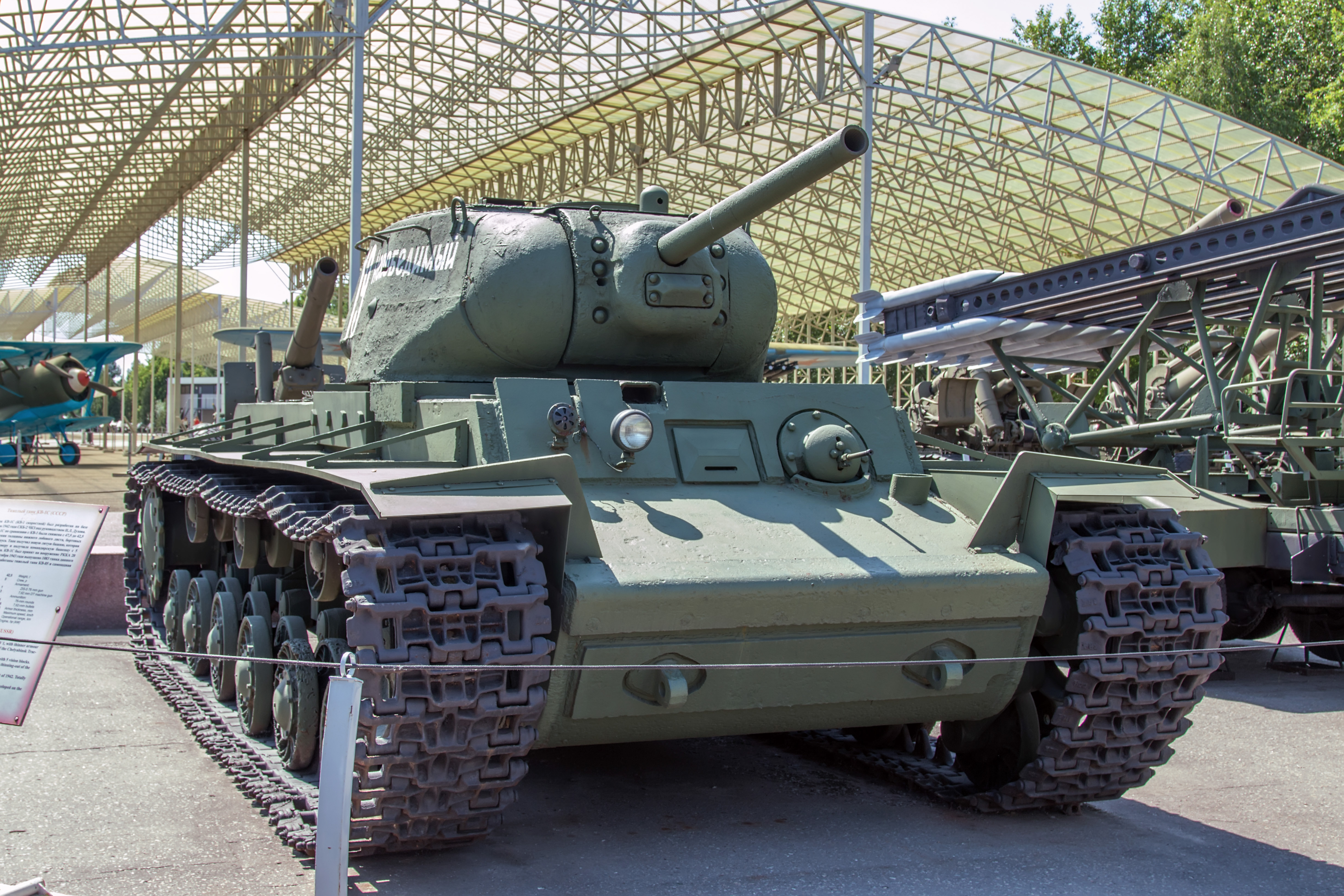
KV-1 with KV-1S turret in the Great Patriotic War Museum, Moscow.

After disappointing results with the multi-turreted T-35 heavy tank, Soviet tank designers started drawing up replacements. The T-35 conformed to the 1920s notion of a "breakthrough tank" with very heavy firepower though its armour protection was lacking and it suffered from poor mobility. The Spanish Civil War demonstrated the need for much heavier armour on tanks, and was the main influence on Soviet tank design just prior to World War II.

Several competing designs were offered, and even more were drawn up prior to reaching prototype stage. All had heavy armour, torsion-bar suspension, wide tracks, and were of welded and cast construction. One of the main competing designs was the SMK, which in its final form had two turrets, mounting one 76.2 mm and one 45 mm weapon. The designers of the SMK independently drew up a single-turreted variant and this received approval at the highest level. Two of these, named after the People's Commissar for Defence, were ordered alongside a single SMK. The smaller hull and single turret enabled the designer to install heavy frontal and turret armour while keeping the weight within manageable limits.

The KV was ordered right off the drawing board. When the Soviets entered the Winter War, the SMK, KV and a third design, the T-100, were sent to be tested in combat conditions. The KV outperformed the SMK and T-100 designs. The KV's heavy armour proved highly resistant to Finnish anti-tank weapons, making it more difficult to stop. In 1939, the production of 50 KVs was ordered. During the war, the Soviets found it difficult to deal with the concrete bunkers used by the Finns and a request was made for a tank with a large howitzer. One of the rush projects to meet the request was to put the howitzer in a new turret on one of the KV tanks. Initially known as 'Malen'kaya Bashenka' (little turret) and 'Bol'shaya Bashnya' (big turret), the 76-mm-armed tank was redesignated as the KV-1 heavy tank and the 152 mm howitzer one as KV-2 heavy artillery tank.

KV tanks first faced the Germans in the Battle of Raseiniai, just after the start of Operation Barbarossa. On 23 June, over 200 German tanks advancing through Lithuania encountered Soviet armor including KV-1 and KV-2 tanks. Although the KVs' frontal armor was sufficient to deflect anti-tank fire, German troops were able to outflank them and destroy them with explosive charges or lure them to within point-blank range of direct-fire artillery. Of the more than 200 Soviet tanks lost at Raseiniai, 29 were KVs.

The KV's strengths included armour that was impenetrable by any tank-mounted weapon then in service except at point-blank range, that it had good firepower, and that it had good flotation on soft ground. It also had serious flaws: it was difficult to steer; the transmission (which was a twenty-year-old Holt Caterpillar design) "was the main stumbling block of the KV-1, and there was some truth to rumors of Soviet drivers having to shift gears with a hand sledge"; and the ergonomics were poor, with limited visibility. Furthermore, at 45 tons, it was simply too heavy. This severely impacted the maneuverability, not so much in terms of maximum speed, as through inability to cross many bridges medium tanks could cross. The KV outweighed most other tanks of the era, being about twice as heavy as the heaviest German tank at that time (before the Tiger). As appliqué armour and other improvements were added without increasing engine power, later models were less capable of keeping up to speed with medium tanks and had more trouble with difficult terrain. In addition, its firepower was no better than that of the T-34. It took field reports from senior commanders "and certified heroes", who could be honest without risk of punishment, to reveal "what a dog the KV-1 really was".

=== Further development ===
By 1942, when the Germans were fielding large numbers of long-barreled 5 cm Pak 38 and 7.5 cm Pak 40 anti-tank guns, the KV's armour was no longer impenetrable, requiring the installation of additional appliqué armour. The KV-1's side (favorable approach: 30° at 300–500 m distance), top, and turret armor could also be penetrated by the high-velocity Mk 101 30 mm cannon carried by German ground attack aircraft, such as the Henschel Hs 129. The KV-1's 76.2 mm gun also came in for criticism. While adequate against all German tanks, it was the same gun as carried by smaller, faster, and cheaper T-34 medium tanks. In 1943, it was determined that this gun could not easily penetrate the frontal armour of the new Tiger, the first German heavy tank, one of which was captured near Leningrad. The KV-1 was also much more difficult to manufacture and thus more expensive than the T-34, its advantages no longer outweighed its drawbacks.

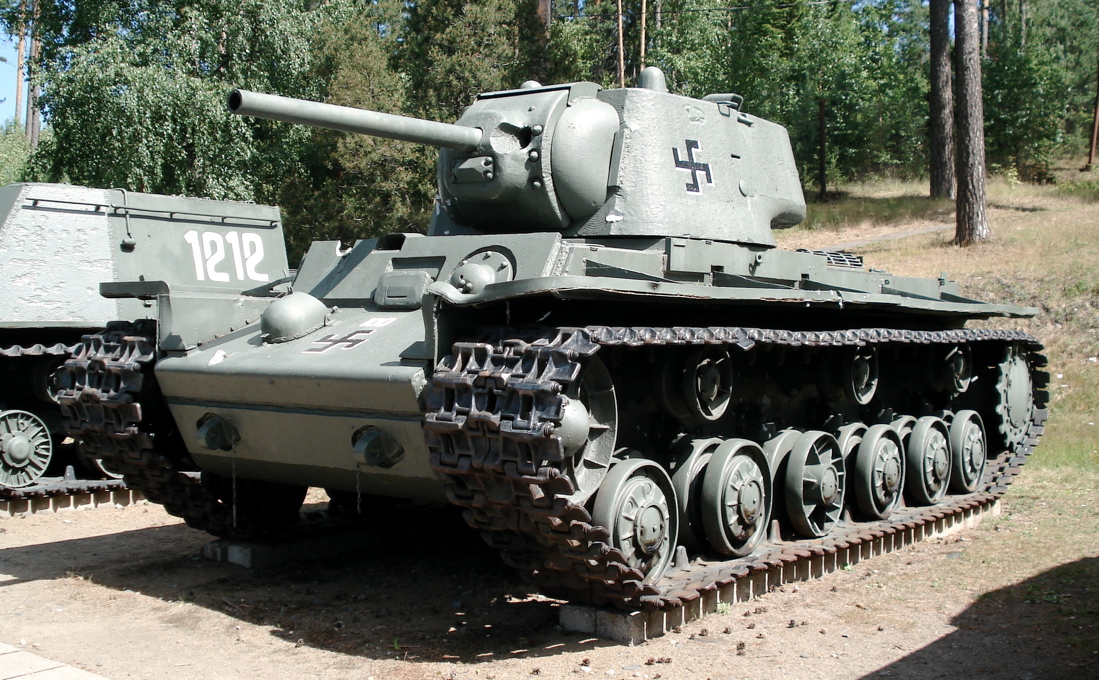
KV-1 produced in 1942, displayed in the Finnish Tank Museum in Parola

Because of its initial superior performance, the KV-1 was chosen as one of the few tanks to continue being built following the Soviet reorganization of tank production. Due to the new standardization, it shared a similar engine and gun as the T-34 (the KV used a 600 hp V-2K modification of the T-34's V-2 diesel engine, and had a ZiS-5 main gun while the T-34 had a similar F-34 main gun), was built in large quantities and received frequent upgrades. When production shifted to the "Tankograd" complex in the Ural Mountains, the KV-2 was dropped. While impressive on paper, it had been designed as a slow-moving bunker-buster. It was less useful in the highly mobile, fluid warfare that developed in World War II. The turret was so heavy it was difficult to traverse on uneven terrain. Finally, it was expensive to produce. Only about 210 KV-2s were made, all in 1940–1941, making it one of the rarest Soviet tanks. The KV-1 continued to get more armor to compensate for the increasing effectiveness of German weapons. This culminated in the KV-1 model 1942 (German designation KV-1C), which had very heavy armor but lacked a corresponding improvement to the engine. It now weighed about 52 tons. Tankers complained that, although they were well-protected, their mobility was poor and they had no firepower advantage over the T-34 medium tank.

=== KV-1S ===
In response to criticisms, the lighter KV-1S was developed with thinner armor and a smaller, lower turret in order to reclaim some speed. The KV-1S had a commander's cupola with all-around vision blocks. It also had a sophisticated planetary transmission that significantly increased the reliability, and allowed use of more efficient regenerative geared steering, unlike the solely clutch and brake steering systems used by the Panzer III, IV and T-34 and previous KV tanks. Its reduced weight allowed it to achieve a top speed of 43.3 km/h. Over 1,300 were built before production ended in August 1943. Although the KV-1S was, according to some, the best of the KV tanks, overcoming its predecessors' problems (at a cost of losing the heavy armor that made the earlier tanks so valuable, making it more of a slow medium tank than a heavy tank), more modern tanks were already in sight. Up-arming the regular turret of the KV-1S with an 85 mm S-31 resulted in the KV-1S-85. This was rejected as it came with the unacceptable loss of a dedicated commander, reducing the turret crew to two (unlike the 3-man turret fitted to the T-34/85). However, the thinning-out of the armor called into question why the tank was being produced at all, when the T-34 could seemingly do everything the KV could do and much more cheaply. The Soviet heavy tank program was close to cancellation in mid-1943.

The appearance of the German Panther tank in the summer of 1943 persuaded the Red Army to make a serious upgrade of its tank force for the first time since 1941. Soviet tanks needed bigger guns to take on the growing numbers of Panthers and the few Tigers.

=== KV-85 ===
KV-85
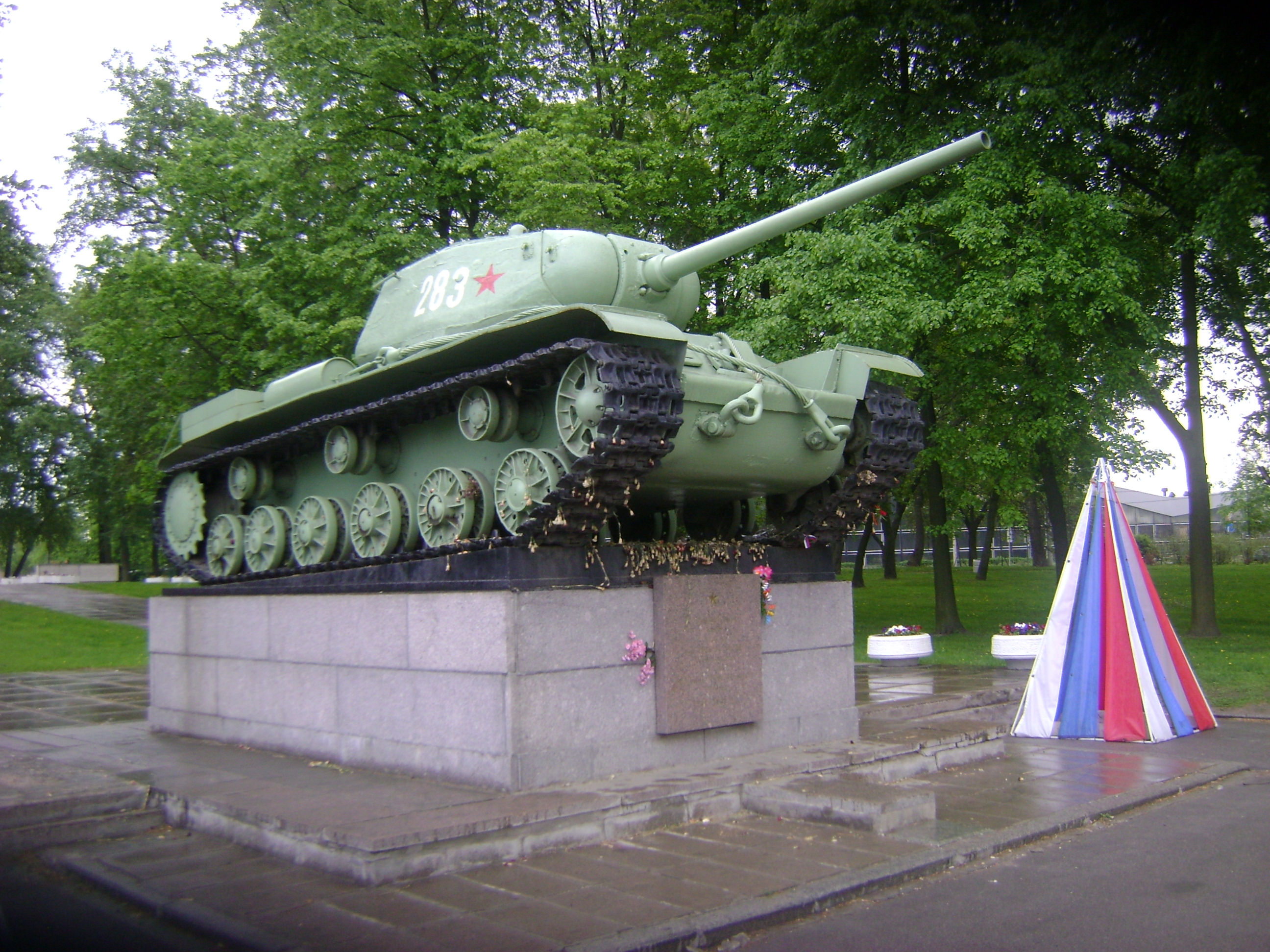
- KV-85 on display
- Type: Heavy tank
- Place of origin: Soviet Union

Service history
- In service: 1943-1945
- Used by: Soviet Union
- Wars: World War II

Production history
- Produced: 1943
- No. built: 148

Specifications
- Mass: 46 t (45 long tons; 51 short tons)
- Length: 8.49 m (27 ft 10 in)
- Width: 3.25 m (10 ft 8 in)
- Height: 2.87 m (9 ft 5 in)
- Crew: 4
- Armour: 30–110 mm (1.2–4.3 in)
- Main armament: 85 mm D-5T tank gun
- Secondary armament: 3 × 7.62 mm DT machine guns
- Engine: V-2K V12 diesel engine 600 hp (450 kW)
- Power/weight: 13 hp/t
- Suspension: Torsion bar
- Operational range: Road: 250 km (160 mi); Cross-country: 180 km (110 mi)
- Maximum speed: 40 km/h (25 mph)

A stopgap upgrade to the KV series was the short-lived KV-85 or Objekt 239. This was a KV-1S with the new turret from the Object 237 (IS-85) still in development, mounting the same 85 mm D-5T gun as the SU-85 and early versions of the T-34-85 (not yet in production at the time). The 85 mm proved capable of penetrating the Tiger I from 1000 m and the demand for it slowed production of the KV-85 tremendously, only 148 were built between August and October 1943. Soviet industry was therefore able to produce a heavy tank as well armed as the Tiger I before the end of 1943. Although the KV-85 was an excellent opponent to the Tigers and Panthers, it was a stopgap and thus was built in small numbers. Its weight had climbed up again to about 47 tons, which negated the whole point of trying to make a lighter KV. The complete Object 237 was accepted into service as the IS-85 and was produced in the autumn and winter of 1943–44; they were sent to the front as of October 1943 and production of the IS-85/IS-1 was stopped by the spring of 1944 once the IS-122/IS-2 entered full-scale production.

=== Successor ===
A new heavy tank design entered production late in 1943 based on the work done on the KV-13. Because Voroshilov had fallen out of political favour, the new heavy tank series was named the Iosif Stalin tank, after the Soviet leader Stalin. The KV-13 program's IS-85 prototype was accepted for production as the IS-1 (or IS-85, Object 237) heavy tank. After testing with both the 100 mm D-10 and 122 mm guns, the D-25T 122 mm gun was selected as the main armament of the new tank, primarily because of its ready availability and the effect of its large high-explosive shell when attacking German fortifications. The 122 mm D-25T used a separate shell and powder charge, resulting in a lower rate of fire and reduced ammunition capacity. While the 122 mm armour-piercing shell had a lower muzzle velocity than similar late German 7.5 cm and 8.8 cm guns, proving-ground tests established that the 122 mm could penetrate the frontal armour of the German Panther tank at 2500 metres and the HE shell would easily blow off the drive sprocket and tread of the heaviest German tank or self-propelled gun. The IS-122 replaced the IS-85, and began mass production as the IS-2. The 85 mm gun saw service in the lighter SU-85 and T-34-85.

== Variants ==
The Soviets did not recognize different production models of KV-1 during the war; designations like model 1939 (M1939, Russian: Obr. 1939) were introduced later in military publications. These designations, however, are not strict and describe leading changes, while other changes might be adapted earlier or later in specific production batches. Designations like KW-1A were applied by the Germans during the war. All tanks in the series were heavily based on the KV-1.

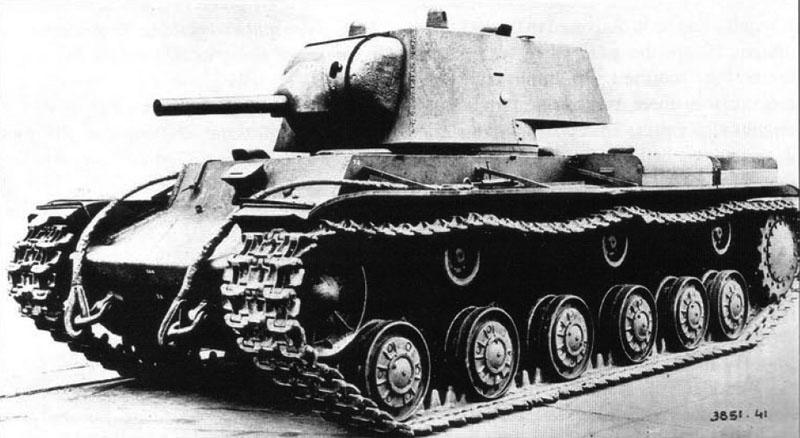
KV-1 model 1939

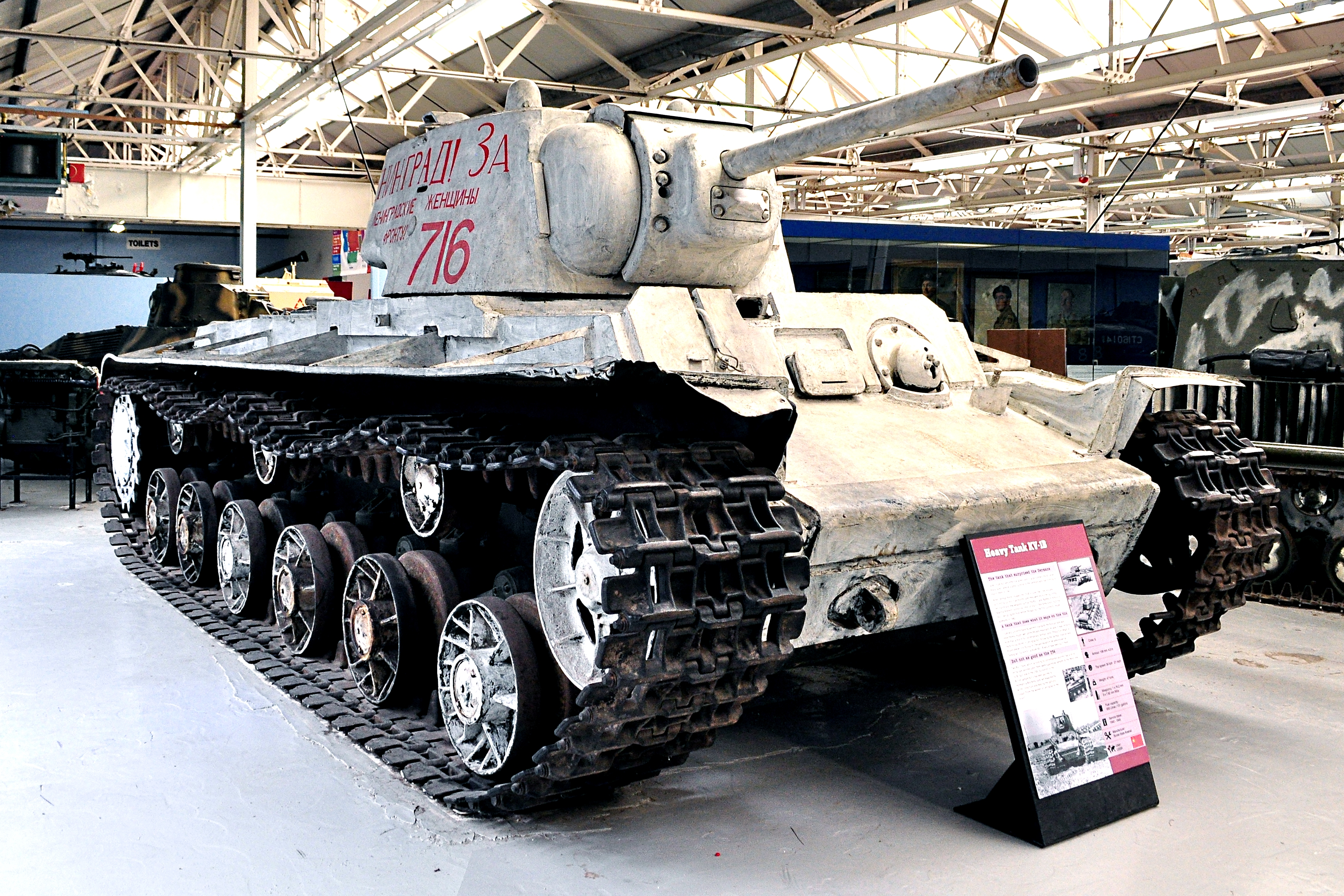
A KV-1B at the Bovington Tank Museum

KV (U-0)
Prototype tank for KV-1, competing with the SMK and T-100 tank. It was armed with 2 guns, 76 mm L-11 and 45 mm 20-K gun. Weight: 40-42 tons.
KV-1

- KV-1 Model 1939 (Russian: KB-1 Obr. 1939)

First production models, these tanks were prone to frequent breakdowns, but were highly resistant to anti-tank weapons during the Winter War. Armed with the 76 mm L-11 tank gun, recognizable due to a recuperator above a barrel. Most tanks were lacking the hull machine gun, earlier ones also had cast turret (different from one used on 1941/42 models). 141 were built. Retrieved 14 March 2025. Weight: 45 tons.

- KV-1 Model 1940 (Russian: KB-1 Obr. 1940; German: Pz.Kpf.Wg. KW-1A 753(r))

The main production model by the time of the German invasion. Used the F-32 76 mm gun and a new mantlet. Weight: 46 tons.

- KV-1 Model 1940 "with shields" (Russian: KB-1 Obr. 1940 s ekranami)

Additional bolted-on appliqué armour added on to the turret and frontal armor. Weight: 49 tons.

- KV-1 Model 1941 (German: Pz.Kpf.Wg. KW-1B 755(r))

Up-armoured with 25–35 mm (0.98–1.38 in) added to the turret, hull front and sides. Later tanks had cast turrets. This tank was armed with the longer-barreled ZiS-5 tank gun. 47-50 tons.

- KV-1 Model 1942 (German: Pz.Kpf.Wg. KW-1C 756(r))

Fully cast turret with thicker armour, again up-armoured, using an improved engine and the 76 mm ZiS-5 tank gun. 52 tons.

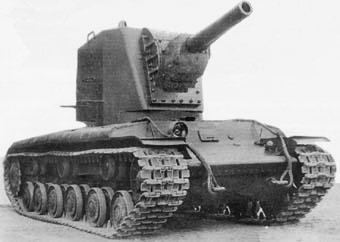
The KV-2 heavy artillery tank's 152 mm howitzer was housed in an enormous turret. This prototype differs from the production version in several ways. It was called the Dreadnought by its crews.

KV-2 (204)
A heavy 52 ton assault tank with the M-10 152 mm howitzer, the KV-2 was produced at the same time as the KV-1. Due to the size of its heavy turret and gun, the KV-2 was slower and had a much higher profile than the KV-1. Those captured and used by the German Army were known as (Sturm)Panzerkampfwagen KW-II 754(r). Few were produced due to its combat ineffectiveness. The increased weight of the new gun and turret led to a decrease in speed and the turret traverse mechanism could only be operated on level ground.

- KV-2 (ZiS-6) — In March 1941 a single 107 mm ZiS-6 was placed into a KV-2 turret for testing. It passed testing by June 1941, after which it was sent to the Artillery Scientific Test Range at Leningrad. While further fate of the vehicle is unknown, it was possibly used (and destroyed) in combat while defending Leningrad.

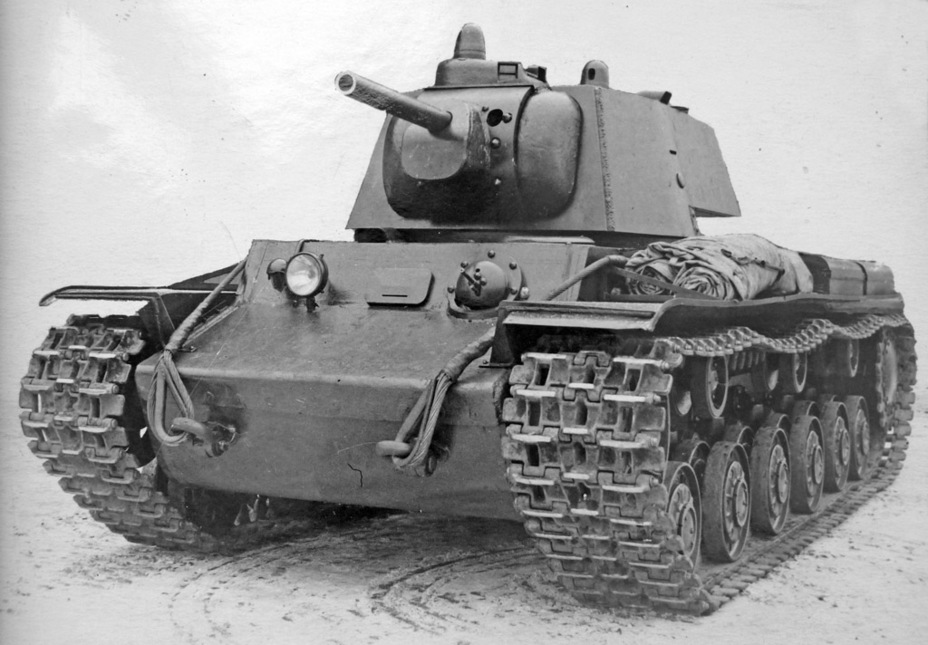
T-150-KV

Т-150 (Object 150)
One of a pair of designs requested 17 June 1940. Armour specified at 90 mm, which caused weight to reach 50 tons, so the 600 hp V-2K was replaced with the 700 hp V-5 engine. In addition to the improved armour, the turret had a cupola but otherwise followed the design of the KV-1. One prototype was constructed in 1941 and was destroyed defending Leningrad. On 15 March 1941 the design was approved for production as the KV-3.
T-220 (Object 220)
Also called KV-220. One of a pair of designs requested 17 June 1940. Longer chassis with 7 rollers per side. Armour specified at 100 mm. Prototype trialed with V-2PUN and V-2SN engines. but suffered engine and suspension problems. New diamond-shaped turret fitted with 85 mm F-30 cannon, but development changed to fitting 107mm F-39 instead. One prototype was constructed in 1941 but did not enter serial production. The prototype later had its turret replaced by standard KV-1 turret and redesignated as KV-220-2; it was destroyed in its first battle with 124th Tank Brigade. Original turret was mounted as static pillbox, its further fate is unknown.
Object 221 (Objects 150, 220, 221, 222, and 223)
Designation initially approved 15 March 1941 for production version of Object 150 tank design. Further developments were made on the basis of the Object 220, in the form of the Object 221 (with an 85 mm gun), Object 222 (with the F-32 76.2 mm gun) and Object 223 (built to develop a new conical turret to house the 107 mm gun, now specified to be the ZiS-6 cannon). Series production was intended to start in late 1941, but the German invasion of the USSR halted these plans, and the only prototype hull was destroyed. The design was accepted for service May 1941 and was to have entered production at the Kirovsky Plant in August 1941, but the German invasion forced this to be abandoned.
KV-4 (Object 224)
A project for a super-heavy tank. About 20 different designs were proposed, but it was cancelled due to the outbreak of the war. Different versions would have been between roughly 85 and 110 tonnes, with armour thickness ranging from 120 to 190 mm. Armament consisted of the 107 mm ZiS-6 cannon. Different variants had various auxiliary weapons: 45 mm, 76 mm cannons, machine guns, and flamethrowers in addition to the main gun.

KV-5 (Object 225)
A cancelled project for a super-heavy tank. Armament was to be a 107 mm ZiS-6 gun in a large turret and a machine gun in a small secondary turret. Weight was projected as about 100 tons, and the tank was to have 150–180 mm of armour. Project development began in June 1941, however, was cancelled due to the Siege of Leningrad, in which all developmental operations at the Kirov Plant were halted. The project fell out of favour from the more advanced heavy tank designs, and no prototype was built.
KV-6 (Object 222)
Also called T-222. Further development of T-150, same hull with modified turret. Projected in 1940, never built. Not to be confused with the fictional KV-VI super heavy tank, built by modeler Brian Fowler in 1995.
KV-7 (Object 227)
Also called U-13. Experimental self-propelled gun with 100 mm of frontal armour, armed with 3 cannons: two 45 mm model 1932/34 and one 76 mm F-34. 200 rounds of ammunition were carried for the 45 mm guns and 93 rounds for the 76 mm gun. One prototype was made, but it never fully entered production.
KV-7-2
Improved variant, also called U-14. Had two 76 mm F-34 cannons, and 85 mm of frontal armour. Vehicles were not taken in service primarily because they could not fight tanks (the KV-7s had only 15-degree gun traverse to each side) and could not combat concrete bunkers due to the small caliber of the guns. After the failure of the KV-7 it was decided to put one 152 mm gun in the casemate instead of three smaller guns; this led to the development of the SU-152.

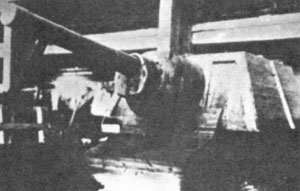
U-18

U-18
Experimental self-propelled gun. KV-7 armed with 152 mm ML-20 gun-howitzer. Vehicle was projected in 1941. Wooden mockup was constructed. Project was cancelled, but this vehicle was a first step towards SU-152 design.
U-19
Experimental self-propelled gun.
S-51
Experimental self-propelled gun projected by the Grabin Artillery Projects Central Department armed with the 203 mm howitzer M1931 (B-4) in a KV-1S hull. The vehicle was to have 75 mm of frontal armour, 60 mm on the side, and the roof was to be 30 mm (the roof would have been removable to facilitate loading). It was projected to weigh 66 tons, one prototype passed by the testing grounds in the spring of 1944 but was not very successful and cancelled within a year.
SU-152
Heavy assault gun based on the KV-1S chassis using 152 mm ML-20 gun-howitzer.
ZiK-20
The ZiK-20 was very similar to the U-19, but had 105 mm of frontal armour, 75 mm of side armour, and was to mount a ML-20 gun. By the time its wooden mockup was made the KV-1 was phased out of production. However, just before the project was cancelled a blueprint was drawn up to equip the ZiK-20 with a 152 mm gun M1935 (Br-2), and to offset the weight the frontal armour was to be reduced to 75 mm (or 60 mm on the KV-1S chassis).
SU-203
SU-152 equipped with 203 mm M-4 mortar. Never built.
KV-8
A KV-1 fitted with the ATO-41 flamethrower in the turret, beside a machine gun. In order to accommodate the new weapon, the 76.2 mm gun was replaced with a smaller 45 mm gun (20-K), though it was disguised to look like the standard 76 mm (the cannon was placed inside a 76 mm tube).

- KV-8S: The same as KV-8 but based on KV-1S. Equipped with ATO-42 flamethrower (improved version of ATO-41). The smaller turret of the KV-1S caused space limitations, so some of the KV-8S had the original KV-8 turret mated to the KV-1S hull, while the remainder had a KV-1S turret with ATO-42 flamethrower but lacked the coaxial machine gun.
- KV-8M: Upgraded version of KV-8S. Equipped with two flamethrowers. Two prototypes were constructed.

KV-9 (Object 229)
A KV-1 with short 122 mm U-11 howitzer. One prototype was constructed and proved in 1941.
KV-10 (Object 230)
Also known as KV-1K. A KV-1 with 4 rocket launchers on the sides of its hull. Each launcher contained two 132 mm M-13 rockets. Early variant of KV-1K had two launchers on the back of the hull, each contained 6 rockets. One prototype was constructed and tested in 1942. Not taken into service.
KV-11 (Object 231)
KV-1 armed with 85 mm F-30 cannon. Projected in 1942. Not built.

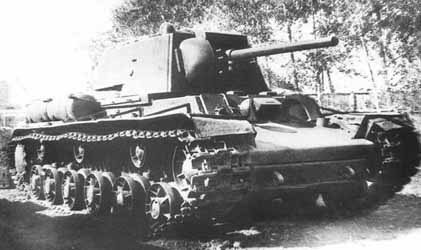
КV-12

KV-12 (Object 232)
Experimental chemical tank. Was equipped with 4 external toxin tanks on rear of chassis. Tanks surrounded with 30 mm armour. Not taken into service.
KV-13 (Object 233)
Also known as IS Model 1. Prototype of a medium tank. Designation for an advanced redesign of the KV series, which resulted in the production of the IS series.

- IS Model 2: A KV-13, with turret and armament of a KV-9. One prototype was constructed and proved in 1943. Tank had lost competition to IS-1 and was not taken into service.

KV-14 (Object 236)
Prototype designation for a 152 mm self-propelled gun, accepted for service as the SU-152.
KV-1S
A variant with higher speed, but thinner armour. A new, smaller, cast turret and redesigned rear hull with a new planetary transmission. 1370 built. 45 tons.
KV-85 (Object 239)
A KV-1S with the 85 mm D-5T cannon in a new turret, with the ball mounted hull machine gun repositioned to the right of driver (now fixed mount) and the hole welded shut; 148 of these tanks were produced in the second half of 1943 until the spring of 1944 as a stopgap until the IS tank series entered production.

- KV-85G — KV-1S with 85 mm S-31 cannon. Turret and mantlet remained from conventional KV-1S. This variant was a competitor of the KV-85 during proving. It lost the competition and was not taken into service.
- KV-122 — A KV-1S with short 122 mm S-41 howitzer. One prototype was made in 1943. Not taken into service.
- KV-100 — A KV-85 with the 100 mm S-34 cannon. One prototype was made in 1944. Not taken into service.
- KV-122 — A KV-85 with the 122 mm D-25T cannon. One prototype was made in 1944. Not taken into service.
- KV-152 — Proposal to fit a 152 mm gun into the turret of a KV-85. Nothing became of the project.

=== Comparison ===
Soviet heavy tanks of World War II
	T-35	KV-1 M1940	KV-1 M1941	KV-1 M1942	KV-1S M1942	KV-85 M1943	IS-2 M1945	IS-3 M1945
Crew	11	5	5	5	5	4	4	4
Weight (tonnes)	45	45	47	52	42,5	47	44	46.5
Gun	76.2 mm KT-28	76.2 mm F-32 (L/31.5)	76.2 mm ZiS-5 (L/42.5)	76.2 mm ZiS-5	76.2 mm ZiS-5	85 mm D-5T	122 mm D-25T	122 mm D-25T
Ammunition	100	111	111	114	114	70	28	28
Secondary armament	2× 45 mm 20-K; 5× 7.62 mm DT	2× 7.62 mm DT	4× DT	4× DT	4× DT	3× DT	3× DT; 1× 12.7 mm DShK	2× DT; 1× 12.7 mm
Engine	500 hp M-17M gasoline	600 hp V-2K diesel	600 hp V-2	600 hp V-2	600 hp V-2	600 hp V-2	600 hp V-2	600 hp V-2-IS
Fuel (litres)	910	600	600	600	975	975	820	520 + 270
Road speed (km/h)	30	35	35	28	45	40	37	37
Road range (km)	150	250	250	250	380	340	240	150 (225)
Cross-country range (km)	70	150	150	150	240	220	180	120 (175)
Armour (mm)	11–30	25–75	30–90	20–130	30–82	30–160	30–160	20–220

== Combat history ==
=== June 1941 Battle of Raseiniai ===
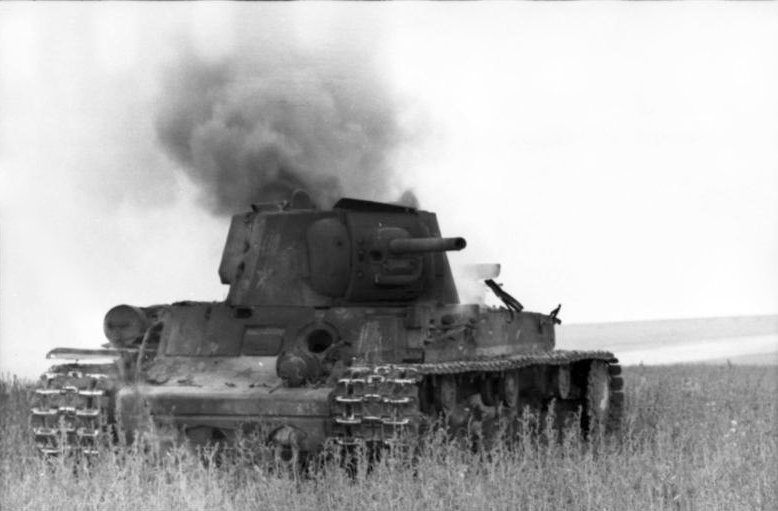
A KV-1 on fire, knocked out near Voronezh in 1942.

A KV-1 or KV-2 tank (accounts vary) advanced far behind the German lines after attacking a column of German trucks. The tank stopped on a road across soft ground and was engaged by four 50 mm anti-tank guns of the anti-tank battalion of the 6th Panzer Division. The tank was hit many times but returned fire, disabling all four guns. A heavy 8.8 cm gun of the German division's anti-aircraft battalion was moved about 730 m (800 yd) behind the tank, but was knocked out by the tank gunner before it could score a hit. During the night, German combat engineers attempted to destroy the tank with satchel charges and failed despite possibly damaging the tracks. Early on the morning of 25 June, German tanks fired on the KV from the woodland while an 88 mm targeted the tank from its rear. Of several shots fired, only two penetrated the tank. German infantry then advanced, with the KV opening machine-gun fire against them. The tank's resistance was finally ended by grenades thrown into the tank's hatches. According to some accounts, the crew was buried by the German soldiers with full military honours; in other accounts, the crew escaped during the night.

General Erhard Raus was commander of the Kampfgruppe of the 6th Panzer Division, the unit delayed by the lone vehicle. He described it as a KV-1, which was damaged by several 8.8 cm anti-tank gun shots fired from behind the vehicle while it was distracted by Panzer 35(t) tanks from Panzer Battalion 65, and the KV-1 crew were killed by members of a pioneer unit who pushed grenades through two holes made by the gun while the turret began moving again, the other five or six shots having not fully penetrated. Apparently, the KV-1 crew had remarkably only been stunned by the shots which had entered the turret. Afterwards, they were buried nearby with military honours by the German unit. (Note: In 1965, the remains of the crew were exhumed and reburied at the military cemetery in Raseiniai. According to research by Russian military historian Maxim Kolomiets, the tank may have been from the 3rd Company of the 1st Battalion, 4th Tank Regiment, part of the 2nd Tank Division. It is impossible to clarify the crew's names because the documents were buried in the woods north of Raseiniai during the retreat.)

=== Krasnogvardeysk ===
On August 14, 1941, the vanguard of the German 8th Panzer Division approached Krasnogvardeysk (Gatchina) near Leningrad (St Petersburg), and the only Soviet force available at the time to attempt to stop the German advance consisted of five well-hidden KV-1 tanks, dug in within a grove at the edge of a swamp. KV-1 tank no. 864 was commanded by the leader of this small force, Lieutenant Zinoviy Kolobanov.

German forces attacked Krasnogvardeysk from three directions. Near Noviy Uchkhoz settlement the geography favoured the Soviet defenders as the only road in the region passed the swamp, and the defenders commanded this choke point from their hidden position. Lieutenant Kolobanov had carefully studied the situation and readied his detachment the day before. Each KV-1 tank carried twice the normal amount of ammunition, two-thirds being armour-piercing rounds. Kolobanov ordered his other commanders to hold their fire and await orders. He did not want to reveal the total force, so only one exposed tank at a time would engage the enemy.

On August 14, the German 8th Panzer Division's vanguard ventured directly into the well-prepared Soviet ambush, with Kolobanov's tank knocking out the lead German tank with its first shot. The Germans falsely assumed that their lead tank had hit an anti-tank mine and failed to realize that they had been ambushed. The German column stopped, giving Kolobanov the opportunity to destroy the second tank. Only then did the Germans realize they were under attack, but they failed to find the source of the shots. While the German tanks were firing blindly, Kolobanov knocked out the trailing German tank, thus boxing in the entire column.

Although the Germans correctly guessed the direction of fire, they could only spot Lieutenant Kolobanov's tank, and now attempted to engage an unseen enemy. German tanks moving off the road bogged down in the surrounding soft ground, becoming easy targets. 22 German tanks and 2 towed artillery pieces fell victim to Kolobanov's No. 864 before it ran out of ammunition. Kolobanov ordered in another KV-1, and 21 more German tanks were destroyed before the half-hour battle ended. A total of 43 German tanks were destroyed by just five Soviet KV-1s (two more remained in reserve).

After the battle, the crew of No. 864 counted a total of 135 hits on their tank, none of which had penetrated the KV-1's armour. Lieutenant Kolobanov was awarded the Order of Lenin, while his Gunner Usov was awarded the Order of the Red Banner. Later, former Captain Zinoviy Kolobanov was again decorated by Soviet authorities.

Kolobanov's feat was so great that when telling his story after the war, civilians and military personnel alike did not believe him, sometimes laughing in disbelief while listening to his tale. A monument dedicated to this battle was installed in the village of Noviy Uchkhoz in 1980, at the place where Kolobanov's KV-1 was dug in, due solely to the demands of the villagers. It was impossible to find a KV-1 tank, so an IS-2 heavy tank was installed there instead.

The Soviet victory was the result of a well-planned ambush in advantageous ground and of technical superiority. Most of the German tanks in this battle were Panzer IIs, armed with 20 mm guns, and a few Panzer IIIs armed with 37 mm KwK 36 L/46.5 guns. The German tank guns had neither the range nor the power of the 76 mm main gun of a KV-1, and the narrower track width of the German tanks caused them to become trapped in the swampy ground.

=== Other users ===
When German forces used captured KV-1s, they were renamed as "Panzerkampfwagen KV-IA 753(r)"

The Finnish forces had two KV-1s, nicknamed Klimi, a Model 1941 and Model 1942, both of which received minor upgrades in their service, and both of which survived the war.

Romanian forces captured one KV-1 as of 1 November 1942 and one more in March 1944.

== Production ==
Production numbers
Year	KV-1	KV-2	KV-1S	KV-8/8S	KV-85	SU-152
1940	139	110				
1941	1,252	100				
1942	1,802		626	127		
1943			459	10	148	670
Total	3,193	210	1,085	137	148	670

== See also ==
- IS tank family
- March of the Soviet Tankmen

Tanks of comparable role, performance and era include

- German Tiger I
- United States Heavy Tank M6
- British Churchill
