= Josef Kotin =

Russian engineer

Josef (also Joseph, Jozef, sometimes Zhozef) Yakovlevich Kotin (Russian: Жозеф Яковлевич Котин; 10 March 1908, Pavlohrad – 21 October 1979, Leningrad) was a Soviet armored vehicle design engineer, Head of all three Leningrad armor design bureaux (1937–39), Chief Designer of the Narkomat for Tank Industry (1939-1941), Deputy Narkom for the tank industry of the Soviet Union (1941-1943), Director of the VNII-100 Research Institute at Kirov Plant, Deputy Defense Industry Minister of the Soviet Union 1968–1972. He is best known for leading the design of some of the Kliment Voroshilov tanks, IS tank family, T-10 tank, SU-152 self-propelled heavy howitzer, Kirovets K-700 tractor and many other armored vehicles and heavy machinery.

He received the title of Hero of Socialist Labour (1941), three Stalin Prizes first degree (1941, 1943, 1946), Stalin Prize second degree (1948). He was married to Nataliya Poklonova, who was an engineer with the RKKA UMM (Soviet army office of motorization and Mechanization).
