= List of Soviet Union military equipment of World War II =

The following is a list of Soviet military equipment of World War II which includes firearms, artillery, vehicles, aircraft and warships used by the Soviet Union (USSR). World War II, the deadliest war in history, started in 1939 and ended in 1945. In accordance with the Nazi–Soviet Pact, Nazi Germany and the USSR jointly attacked Poland in September 1939, marking the start of the war, but Germany later broke the pact and attacked the USSR in June 1941. The USSR lost 26.6 million people during the war. The war in Europe ended on 8 May 1945 with the capitulation of Germany to the allied (including Soviet) forces. About 80-90% of losses during the entire war the German armed forces suffered on the Soviet (Eastern) front, whose contribution to the victory was decisive. From 1941 to April 1945, the Soviet Union had produced 19.83 million rifles; 98.3 thousand tanks and self-propelled guns; 525.5 thousand guns and mortars; 122.1 thousand combat aircraft; 70 combat ships.

== Helmets ==
Name	Type	Origin	Photo	Notes
SSh-36	Combat helmet	Soviet Union		In production from 1936 to 1941. Used until about 1943. Replaced by SSh-39 and SSh-40 helmets.
SSh-39	Combat helmet	Soviet Union		Replacement for the SSh-36 helmet.
SSh-40	Combat helmet	Soviet Union		Most common helmet in Soviet service. Visually different from SSh-39 by having six rivets instead of three. Simpler and sturdier liner compared to its predecessor.

== Body Armour ==
Name	Type	Origin	Photo	Notes
Steel breastplate	Body Armour	Soviet Union		Two 2 mm pressed steel plates that protected the front torso and groin. Used by assault engineers. They only provided limited protection against 9 mm rounds.

== Knives ==
Name	Type	Origin	Photo	Notes
NR-40	Combat knife	Soviet Union		Soviet combat knife that was produced after the Winter War in 1940.
AVS-36	Bayonet knife	Soviet Union		Soviet bayonet knife issued with the AVS-36 automatic rifle. The fact that the AVS-36 was used in very limited numbers; most without the bayonet; made it very rare.

== Small arms ==
=== Handguns ===
Name	Type	Cartridge	Origin	Photo	Notes
Nagant M1895	Revolver	7.62×38mmR	Russian Empire		7-round cylinder.
Tokarev TT-33	Semi-automatic pistol	7.62×25mm Tokarev	Soviet Union		8-round magazine. Widely used by officers, did not fully replace the Nagant M1895. Improved version of the TT-30.
Mauser C96	Semi-automatic pistol	7.63×25mm Mauser	German Empire		10-round internal magazine. Nicknamed "Bolo". Small amount captured from German forces.
Korovin pistol	Semi-automatic pistol	.25 ACP	Soviet Union		8-round detachable box magazine. Produced from 1926 to 1935 in small numbers, due to complex design. Used mostly by officers.
Colt M1911	Semi-automatic pistol	.45 ACP	United States		7-round detachable box magazine. Some were captured during the Allied intervention in the Russian Civil War and put to use. During WW2, the USA's Lend-Lease provided 12,977 extra Colt pistols.

=== Rifles ===
Name	Type	Cartridge	Origin	Photo	Notes
Mosin–Nagant M1891/30	Bolt-action rifle	7.62×54mmR	Soviet Union		5-round internal magazine. Most widely used bolt-action rifle by the Red Army. Sniper variant was produced, that could be fitted with the PE/PEM scope or PU scope.
Mosin–Nagant M1938 Carbine	Bolt-action rifle	7.62×54mmR	Soviet Union		5-round internal magazine.
Mosin–Nagant M1944 Carbine	Bolt-action rifle	7.62×54mmR	Soviet Union		5-round internal magazine.
Tokarev SVT-38	Semi-automatic rifle	7.62×54mmR	Soviet Union		10-round magazine. Produced from 1939 to 1940. Inaccurate and prone to failure. Sniper variant was produced, that could be fitted with the PE/PEM scope or PU scope.
Tokarev SVT-40	Semi-automatic rifle	7.62×54mmR	Soviet Union		10-round magazine. Produced from 1940 to 1945. Most widely used semi-automatic rifle by the Red Army. Sniper variant was produced, that could be fitted with the PE/PEM scope or PU scope.
Fedorov Avtomat	Battle rifle	6.5×50mmSR Arisaka	Russian Empire		25-round magazine. Produced from 1913 to 1925. Deployed during the Winter War from stockpiles due to a shortage of submachine guns.
Simonov AVS-36	Battle rifle	7.62×54mmR	Soviet Union		15-round magazine. Produced from 1934 to 1940. Overcomplicated, unreliable and difficult to control, it was soon taken out of service.
Tokarev AVT-40	Battle rifle	7.62×54mmR	Soviet Union		10-round magazine. Modified SVT-40 with a different firing selector. Produced from May 1942 until halted in the summer of 1943 due to mostly uncontrollable automatic fire and breakage.

=== Submachine guns ===
Name	Type	Cartridge	Origin	Photo	Notes
PPD-34	Submachine gun	7.62×25mm Tokarev	Soviet Union		25-round magazine. Based and adapted from the Suomi KP/-31, was not produced in larger quantities until 1937–1939.
PPD-34/38 / PPD-40	Submachine gun	7.62×25mm Tokarev	Soviet Union		71-round magazine. Developed from PPD-34. Simplified versions, that accept a drum magazine.
PPSh-41	Submachine gun	7.62×25mm Tokarev	Soviet Union		35, 71-round magazine. Produced from 1941 to 1947. Most widely used Soviet submachine gun. Very fast rate of fire (1,250 RPM). Effective in CQB. Raw quality, produced in very large numbers (about 6,000,000).
PPS-42 / PPS-43	Submachine gun	7.62×25mm Tokarev	Soviet Union		35-round magazine. Produced from 1942 to 1946. Designed to be even simpler than the PPSh-41.
Thompson M1928A1	Submachine gun	.45 ACP	United States		20, 30, 50-round magazine. 137,790 supplied by the United States during the Lend-Lease program.
M50 Reising	Submachine gun	.45 ACP	United States		12, 20-round magazine. Supplied by the United States during the Lend-Lease program.

=== Machine guns ===
Name	Type	Cartridge	Origin	Photo	Notes
DP-27	Light machine gun	7.62×54mmR	Soviet Union		47-round magazine. Most widely used light machine gun by the Red Army.
DS-39	Medium machine gun	7.62×54mmR	Soviet Union		250-round belt.
SG-43 Gorunov	Medium machine gun	7.62×54mmR	Soviet Union		200, 250-round belt.
PM M1910	Heavy machine gun	7.62×54mmR	Russian Empire		250-round belt.
DShK 1938	Heavy machine gun	12.7×108mm	Soviet Union		50-round belt.
Bren Gun	Light Machine Gun	.303 British	United Kingdom		30-round detachable box magazine. 2487 supplied by the British Empire during the Lend-Lease program, many mounted on Universal Carriers.
Maxim-Tokarev	Light Machine Gun	7.62×54mmR	Soviet Union		belt-feed, 100 rounds belt

== Prototype Firearms ==
- PPD-42 - A prototype submachine gun designed by Vasily Deygtyaryov in 1942
- PPK-42 - A prototype submachine gun designed by Mikhail Kalashnikov in 1942
- AS-44 - A prototype assault rifle designed by Alexei Sudayev in 1944.

== Explosives, hand-held anti-tank and incendiary weapons ==
=== Grenades and grenade launchers ===
Name	Type	Diameter	Origin	Photo	Notes
Model 1914 grenade	Fragmentation grenade	45mm	Russian Empire		Limited usage during World War II.
F1 grenade	Fragmentation grenade	55mm	Soviet Union		Widely produced grenade. Nicknamed the "limonka" (lemon).
RG-41	Fragmentation grenade	55mm	Soviet Union		5 meter kill radius.
RG-42	Fragmentation grenade	54mm	Soviet Union		Produced in 1942 to replace the complex RGD-33. Soviet partisans made copies of it when they were located behind enemy lines.
RGD-33 grenade	Fragmentation grenade	45mm, 54mm (with fragmentation sleeve)	Soviet Union		10–15 meter kill radius.
RPG-40 / RPG-41	Anti-tank grenade	20 cm	Soviet Union		Effective against tanks up to 20mm of armour.
RPG-43	Anti-tank grenade	95mm	Soviet Union		Improved version of the RPG-40. Effective against tanks up to 75mm of armour.
RPG-6	Anti-tank grenade	103mm	Soviet Union		Improved version of the RPG-43. Effective against tanks up to 100mm of armour.
Dyakonov grenade launcher	Grenade launcher	40.5mm	Soviet Union		Grenade launcher attachment for Mosin-Nagant rifle. There were four other versions of the grenade besides the main high explosive one.

=== Mines ===
Name	Type	Detonation	Origin	Photo	Notes
POMZ mine	Anti-personnel mine	Pressure/Tripwire	Soviet Union		75 g of TNT.
PMD series mine	Anti-personnel mine	Pressure	Soviet Union		200 g of TNT.
TM-35 mine	Anti-tank mine	Pressure	Soviet Union		2.8 kg of TNT.
TM-38	Anti-tank mine	Pressure	Soviet Union		2.95 kg of TNT.
TM-41 mine	Anti-tank mine	Pressure	Soviet Union		3.9 kg of Amatol or TNT, short cylinder with the entire top surface being used as a pressure plate.
TM-44 mine	Anti-tank mine	Pressure	Soviet Union		5.4 kg of Amatol, broadly similar to the earlier, smaller, TM-41 mine.
TMD-40 mine	Anti-tank mine	Pressure	Soviet Union		3.2 kg of TNT.
TMD-44 / TMD-B mines	Anti-tank mine	Pressure	Soviet Union		9–9.7 kg of Amatol.

=== Recoilless rifles ===
Name	Type	Calibre	Origin	Photo	Notes
76 K/DRP	Recoilless rifle	76mm	Soviet Union		Used during the Winter War. It was designed by L.V. Kurchevsky in 1930 and entered service in 1932. It was able to be mounted on GAZ-A trucks, becoming SU-4 self-propelled guns.

=== Infantry anti-tank rifles and rocket launchers ===
Name	Type	Calibre	Origin	Photo	Notes
PTRD-41	Anti-tank rifle	14.5×114mm	Soviet Union		Single-shot reloadable rifle.
PTRS-41	Anti-tank rifle	14.5×114mm	Soviet Union		5-round internal magazine.
M1 Bazooka	Recoilless anti-tank rocket launcher	60 mm	United States		Single-shot reloadable launcher. 3,000 supplied by the United States during the Lend-Lease program.
PIAT	Anti-tank projectile launcher	83mm	United Kingdom		Single-shot reloadable launcher. 1,000 supplied by the British Empire during the Lend-Lease program.
Panzerschreck	Anti-tank rocket launcher	88mm	Nazi Germany		Single-shot reloadable launcher. Captured from German forces copy the Bazooka.
Panzerfaust	Anti-tank recoilless gun	Depends on variant	Nazi Germany		Single-shot disposable launcher. Some were captured in 1944, while many were captured in 1945 from retreating German soldiers and Volkssturm.

=== Flamethrowers and anti-tank incendiaries ===
Name	Type	Origin	Photo	Notes
FOG-2	Flamethrower	Soviet Union		From 1941, around 15,000 were produced and used during World War 2.
ROKS-2 / ROKS-3	Flamethrower	Soviet Union		Produced from 1935 to 1945. Used also during the Soviet-Finnish War (1941–1944).
Molotov cocktail	Improvised incendiary bottle	Spain		Improvised incendiary bottles that were thrown at armoured vehicles. Invented by the Spanish Nationalists in the Spanish Civil War. First widely used by Finnish troops against the Soviets during the Winter War.
Ampulomyot	Incendiary anti-tank ampulla-thrower	Soviet Union		125mm incendiary spherical glass projectile. Use of it was limited in 1941, and became obsolete by 1942.
Zuckermann's bottle-thrower	Incendiary anti-tank bottle launcher	Soviet Union		Attachment for Mosin-Nagant rifles. Special bottles with incendiary mixtures were used. The bottles were produced in 1942, but became obsolete once Red Army troops were equipped with more anti-tank guns and rifles.

== Artillery ==
=== Light and heavy infantry mortars ===
Name	Type	Origin	Photo	Notes
RM-38	50mm Infantry mortar	Soviet Union		Light infantry mortar.
82-BM-37	82mm Infantry mortar	Soviet Union		Light infantry mortar.
M1938 mortar	120mm Heavy mortar	Soviet Union		Heavy infantry mortar.
107mm M1938 mortar	107mm Infantry mortar	Soviet Union		It was a lighter version of the M1938 mortar made for Soviet mountain troops.

=== Rocket launchers ===
Name	Type	Origin	Photo	Notes
BM-8	82mm Multiple rocket launcher	Soviet Union		Smaller rocket launchers that were mounted on T-40 and T-60 light tanks.
BM-13 "Katyusha"	132mm Multiple rocket launcher	Soviet Union		Most widely used multiple rocket launcher by the Red Army. It became known as "Stalin's organ" by German soldiers.
BM-31 "Andryusha"	300mm Multiple rocket launcher	Soviet Union		Heavy rocket launcher with 12 rocket tubes which used the chassis of the American Lend-Lease Studebaker US6 U3 truck.

=== Vehicular guns ===
Name	Type	Origin	Photo	Notes
45mm 20-K tank gun	45mm Anti-tank gun	Soviet Union		Many tanks and other armoured vehicles later used it as their main armament.
57mm ZiS-4 tank gun	57mm Anti-tank gun	Soviet Union		The main armament of the T-34-57, saw very limited usage in combat.
76.2 mm L-10 tank gun	76mm Anti-tank gun	Soviet Union		The main armament of the T-28 tank.
L-11 76.2 mm tank gun	76mm Anti-tank gun	Soviet Union		The main armament of the T-34 Model 1940 tank.
F-32 tank gun	76mm Anti-tank gun	Soviet Union		The main armament of the KV-1 Model 1940 tank.
F-34 tank gun	76mm Anti-tank gun	Soviet Union		The main armament of T-34-76 and KV-1 tanks.
D-5T tank gun	85mm Anti-tank gun	Soviet Union		Main armament of the T34-85 (until March 1944), SU-85 and KV-85. Developed from 85mm M1939 (52-K) air-defence gun.
ZiS-S-53 tank gun	85mm Anti-tank gun	Soviet Union		Main armament of T34-85 from March 1944; also used on T-44. Developed from 85mm M1939 (52-K) air-defence gun.
D-10 tank gun	100mm Anti-tank gun	Soviet Union		The main armament of the SU-100 tank destroyer.

=== Field artillery ===
Name	Type	Origin	Production	Photo	Notes
76-mm regimental gun model 1927	Regimental gun	Soviet Union	Dec. 1928 – Dec. 1943: about 18,116		The 76-mm regimental guns model 1927 together with the Soviet infantry passed the Battle of Lake Khasan and the Battles of Khalkhin Gol, the Winter War and the Great Patriotic War. During offensives, such regimental guns, which were respected by soldiers, had to follow by their crews directly in infantry combat formations in order to quickly suppress the enemy firepower, interfering with the advance of troops. Until 1941, the guns were produced at Kirov Plant in Leningrad, and in 1942–1943 - at Plant No. 172 in Perm.
76 mm regimental gun M1943	76mm Infantry support gun	Soviet Union			
76 mm mountain gun M1909	76mm Mountain gun	France			It became obsolete after it was replaced with several other mountain guns.
76 mm mountain gun M1938	76mm Mountain gun	Soviet Union			
76 mm divisional gun M1902/30	76mm Field gun	Soviet Union			
76 mm divisional gun M1936 (F-22)	76mm Field gun	Soviet Union			Used during the Winter War.
76 mm divisional gun M1939 (USV)	76mm Field gun	Soviet Union			
76 mm divisional gun M1942 (ZiS-3)	76mm Field gun	Soviet Union			Field gun first deployed in 1941, very well-liked by Soviet and German soldiers because of its reliability, durability, and accuracy.
100 mm field gun M1944 (BS-3)	100mm Field gun / Anti-tank gun	Soviet Union			
107 mm divisional gun M1940 (M-60)	107mm Field gun	Soviet Union			
107 mm gun M1910/30	107mm Field gun	Soviet Union			
122 mm gun M1931 (A-19)	122mm Field gun	Soviet Union			
122 mm gun M1931/37 (A-19)	122mm Field gun	Soviet Union			
122 mm howitzer M1909/37	122mm Field howitzer	Soviet Union			
122 mm howitzer M1910/30	122mm Field howitzer	Soviet Union			
122 mm howitzer M1938 (M-30)	122mm Field howitzer	Soviet Union			
152 mm gun M1910/34	152mm Field gun	Soviet Union			
152 mm gun M1935 (Br-2)	152mm Heavy gun	Soviet Union			It was used by the Red Army in the Battle of Kursk and Battle of the Seelow Heights.
152 mm howitzer M1909/30	152mm Field howitzer	Soviet Union			Most numerously used 152mm howitzer by the Red Army.
152 mm howitzer M1910/37	152mm Field howitzer	Soviet Union			
152 mm howitzer M1938 (M-10)	152mm Field howitzer	Soviet Union			
152 mm howitzer M1943 (D-1)	152mm Field howitzer	Soviet Union			
152 mm howitzer-gun M1937 (ML-20)	152mm Field howitzer	Soviet Union			

=== Fortress and siege guns ===
Name	Type	Origin	Photo	Notes
152 mm gun M1910/30	152mm Field howitzer	Soviet Union		
203 mm howitzer M1931 (B-4)	203mm Heavy howitzer	Soviet Union		It was used by the Red Army in the Battle of Berlin.
210 mm gun M1939 (Br-17)	210mm Heavy howitzer	Soviet Union		
280 mm mortar M1939 (Br-5)	280mm Heavy mortar	Soviet Union		
305 mm howitzer M1939 (Br-18)	305mm Superheavy siege howitzer	Soviet Union		

=== Anti-tank guns ===
Name	Type	Origin	Photo	Notes
37 mm anti-tank gun M1930 (1-K)	37mm Anti-tank gun	Soviet Union		The gun was closely related to the German PaK 35/36.
45 mm anti-tank gun M1932 (19-K)	45mm Anti-tank gun	Soviet Union		
45 mm anti-tank gun M1937 (53-K)	45mm Anti-tank gun	Soviet Union		
45 mm anti-tank gun M1942 (M-42)	45mm Anti-tank gun	Soviet Union		
57 mm anti-tank gun M1943 (ZiS-2)	57mm Anti-tank gun	Soviet Union		
100 mm field gun M1944 (BS-3)	100mm Anti-tank gun / Field gun	Soviet Union		

== Ground-based anti-aircraft weapons ==
=== Light anti-aircraft guns ===
Name	Type	Calibre	Origin	Photo	Notes
DShK 1938	Heavy machine gun	12.7×108mm	Soviet Union		50-round belt.
25 mm automatic air defense gun M1940 (72-K)	Air-defence gun	25x218mmSR	Soviet Union		
37 mm automatic air defense gun M1939 (61-K)	Air-defence gun	37×250mmR	Soviet Union		200-rounds.
45 mm anti-aircraft gun (21-K)	Semi-automatic air-defence gun	45×386mmSR	Soviet Union		It was used by the Soviet Navy for most of their ships from 1934 as its primary light anti-aircraft gun until replaced by the fully automatic 37 mm 70-K gun from 1942 to 1943.
37 mm 70-K gun	Automatic air-defence gun	37×250mmR	Soviet Union		Naval version of 37mm M1939 (61-K).

=== Heavy anti-aircraft guns ===
Name	Type	Calibre	Origin	Photo	Notes
76 mm air defense gun M1938	Semi-automatic air-defence gun	76.2×558mmR	Soviet Union		
85 mm air defense gun M1939 (52-K)	Semi-automatic air-defence gun	85×558mmR	Soviet Union		It was successfully used against level bombers and medium/high altitude targets.

== Armored fighting vehicles ==
=== Tankettes ===
Name	Type	Origin	Quantity	Photo	Notes
T-27	Tankette	Soviet Union	2,157 (1941)		The main armament was the 7.62mm DT light machine gun. Some were captured by Romanian forces.

=== Tanks ===
Name	Type	Origin	Production	Photo	Notes
T-18 (MS-1)	Light tank	Soviet Union			Based on the French Renault FT tank.
T-26	Light tank	Soviet Union			Interwar period light tank that became the most numerous tank during the German invasion.
T-37A	Amphibious light tank	Soviet Union			
T-38	Amphibious light tank	Soviet Union			
T-40	Amphibious scout tank	Soviet Union			
T-30	Light tank	Soviet Union			
T-50	Light infantry tank	Soviet Union			
T-60	Light scout tank	Soviet Union			Replacement of the obsolete T-38 and T-30 tanks.
T-70	Light tank	Soviet Union			
BT-2	Light cavalry tank	Soviet Union			
BT-5	Light cavalry tank	Soviet Union			
BT-7	Light cavalry tank	Soviet Union			
T-24	Medium tank	Soviet Union			
T-28	Medium tank	Soviet Union			
T-34-76	Medium tank	Soviet Union			One of the most widely used tanks in the Red Army. 35,120 were produced.
T-34-85	Medium tank	Soviet Union	Jan. 1944 – Dec. 1946: 25,914 (also under license - 2,736 in Czechoslovakia in 1951 – 1956 & 1,380 in Poland in 1952 – 1956)		A development of a deep modernization of the T-34 medium tank (especially its armament) began in summer 1943. To combat new German Tiger I and Panther tanks, a powerful 85-mm ZIS-S-53 tank gun was mounted within a new larger turret for T-34. T-34-85 medium tanks were produced at Plants No. 112 (in Gorky), No. 183 (in Nizhny Tagil) and No. 174 (in Omsk).
T-35	Heavy tank	Soviet Union			During the war, they were slow and proved to be mechanically unreliable. 61 were produced.
SMK	Heavy tank prototype	Soviet Union			Only one was produced, it was used during the Winter War. It was replaced by the KV tank series.
T-100	Heavy tank prototype	Soviet Union			Two were produced. There were unsuccessful trial uses of it during the Winter War. It was replaced by the KV tank series.
KV-1	Heavy tank	Soviet Union			Known for its strong armour, it became known as the "Russischer Koloss" – "Russian Colossus" by the German Army.
KV-2	Heavy tank / Assault gun	Soviet Union			The main armament was the 152mm howitzer. Due to its combat ineffectiveness, only 334 were produced .
KV-85	Heavy tank	Soviet Union			It became the basis for the IS Series tanks.
IS-1	Heavy tank	Soviet Union			The IS series was a successor to the KV tank series. IS-1 was a prototype version, which had 130 produced.
IS-2	Heavy tank	Soviet Union			3,854 IS-2s were produced.

=== Self-propelled guns ===
Name	Type	Origin	Production	Photo	Notes
ZiS-30	Tank destroyer	Soviet Union			A self-propelled gun based on Komsomolets tractor fitted with 57 mm ZiS-2 Anti-tank gun. Only 100 were built.
SU-5-1 / SU-5-2 / SU-5-3	Self-propelled gun	Soviet Union			A self-propelled gun that was on the T-26 light tank chassis. SU-5-1 was armed with the 76.2mm divisional gun mod. 1902/30. SU-5-2 was armed with the 122mm howitzer mod. 1910/30.
SU-5-3	Self-propelled gun	Soviet Union			It was on the T-26 chassis. Equipped with the 152mm mortar M1931.
SU-14	Self-propelled gun	Soviet Union			One was built as a prototype. The main armament was the 152 mm gun (U-30 or BR-2).
SU-100Y	Self-propelled gun prototype	Soviet Union			One prototype was made, based on the SU-100 tank and was used during the Winter War. The main armament was the 130mm Naval Gun B-13.
SU-26	Self-propelled gun	Soviet Union			Equipped with a 76 mm regimental gun M1927.
SU-76 / SU-76M	Light self-propelled gun	Soviet Union	Dec. 1942 – Oct. 1945: 14,292 (560 SU-76 & 13,732 SU-76M)		The SU-76M was the second most produced Soviet AFV of World War II, after the T-34 medium tank. Developed under the leadership of chief designer S. A. Ginzburg (1900–1943). This infantry support SPG was based on the lengthened T-70 light tank chassis and armed with the ZIS-3 76-mm divisional field gun.
SU-85	Self-propelled gun	Soviet Union			A modification of SU-122 self-propelled gun based on T-34's chassis, equipped with 85 mm D-5S cannon.
SU-100	Self-propelled gun	Soviet Union			A modification of SU-85M that replaced its 85mm gun with 100 mm D-10S.
SU-122	Assault gun	Soviet Union			A self-propelled gun version based on T-34's chassis, equipped with 122 mm M-30S Howitzer.
SU-152	Assault gun	Soviet Union			Self-propelled gun based on KV-1S's chassis, equipped with 152 mm ML-20S howitzer.
ISU-122	Assault gun	Soviet Union			A rearmed ISU-152 with 122 mm A-19S for ISU-122 and D-25S for ISU-122S.
ISU-152	Assault gun	Soviet Union			Same role and armament as SU-152 but with IS-1's chassis

=== Wheeled anti-tank self-propelled guns ===
Name	Type	Origin	Photo	Notes
SU-4	Wheeled self-propelled anti-tank gun	Soviet Union		On the chassis of an extended GAZ-A. It was equipped with a 76 K/DRP recoilless gun.
SU-12	Wheeled self-propelled anti-tank gun	Soviet Union		On the chassis of a GAZ-AAA. It was equipped with a 76 mm regimental gun M1927.

=== Tracked anti-aircraft guns ===
Name	Type	Calibre	Origin	Photo	Notes
SU-11	Self-propelled anti-aircraft gun	37×250mmR	Soviet Union		It was equipped with the 37mm automatic air defence gun (61-К).
ZSU-37	Self-propelled anti-aircraft gun	37×250mmR	Soviet Union		It was equipped with the 37mm automatic air defence gun (61-К).

=== Armoured cars ===
Name	Type	Origin	Photo	Notes
BA-27M	Armoured car	Soviet Union		First Soviet series-produced armoured car. The main armament was the 37mm Puteaux SA 18. Some were captured during the German invasion of the Soviet Union.
D-8	Armoured car	Soviet Union		The main armament was two 7.62 DT light machine guns. It was used during the Winter War.
FAI	Armoured car	Soviet Union		Replacement for the D-8 armoured car. The main armament was the 7.62 DT light machine gun.
BA-I	Armoured car	Soviet Union		Its main armament was the 37mm 7K gun. The design of the BA-I started a series of heavy armoured cars of Izhorsky plant. These included: BA-3, BA-6, BA-9, and BA-10.
BA-3	Armoured car	Soviet Union		The main armament was the 45mm gun 20-K.
BA-6	Armoured car	Soviet Union		Very similar to the BA-3. Both were used against the Japanese in the Battle of Khalkhyn Gol, in the Finnish Winter War, and against the Germans in the early stages of the Eastern Front.
BA-10	Armoured car	Soviet Union		The main armament was the 45mm gun 20-K.
BA-11	Armoured car	Soviet Union		The main armament was the 45mm gun 20-K.
BA-20	Armoured car	Soviet Union		Special armoured version of the GAZ-M1 passenger car. The main armament was the 7.62 DT light machine gun.
BA-64	Armoured scout car	Soviet Union		Based and adapted from a captured German Sd.Kfz. 221. The main armament was the 7.62 DT light machine gun.

=== Half-tracks ===
Name	Type	Origin	Photo	Notes
BA-30	Half-tracked armored car	Soviet Union		A small number of them were produced. The main armament was the 7.62 DT light machine gun.
M5	Half-tracked armoured personnel carrier	United States		Received 450 during World War II through Lend-Lease.
M3 half-track	Half-tracked armoured personnel carrier	United States		Received 2 during World War II through Lend-Lease.

=== Improvised armoured fighting vehicles ===
Name	Type	Origin	Delivery	Photo	Notes
NI tank	Improvised fighting vehicle	Soviet Union			NI tank was a Soviet improvised fighting vehicle, based on an STZ-3 agricultural tractor, manufactured in Odessa during the Siege of Odessa in World War II
KhTZ-16	Improvised fighting vehicle	Soviet Union			KhTZ-16 was a Soviet improvised fighting vehicle of the Second World War, built on the chassis of an STZ-3 tractor.

=== Armoured trains ===
Name	Type	Origin	Delivery	Photo	Notes
Tula Armoured Train	Armoured train	Soviet Union			

=== Lend-Lease tanks and SPGs ===
Name	Type	Origin	Delivery	Photo	Notes
M3A1 (Stuart III)	Light tank	United States	1,233		From 1941 to 1945, 1,676 were supplied by the United States as a part of the Lend-Lease. 443 were lost at sea.
M5 (Stuart VI)	Light tank	United States	5		5 were supplied.
M24 Chaffee	Light tank	United States	2		2 were supplied in 1944.
M4 Sherman	Medium tank	United States	4,102		4,102 were supplied, of these, 2,007 were the original 75 mm main gun model, 2,095 were with 76 mm tank gun.
Valentine tank	Infantry tank	United Kingdom	3,462		2,074 supplied by the UK, 1,388 supplied by Canada. 320 were lost at sea by both countries.
T48 Gun Motor Carriage (SU-57)	Tank destroyer	United States	650		650 were supplied. On the chassis of the M3 Half-track equipped with a 57mm gun M1. It was designated as the SU-57 by the Soviet military.

== Motor vehicles ==
=== Trucks ===
Name	Type	Origin	Photo	Notes
GAZ-AA	Truck	Soviet Union		Soviet produced vehicle licensed from the Ford AA model of 1930.
GAZ-AAA	Truck	Soviet Union		
GAZ-MM	Truck	Soviet Union		
ZIS-5	Truck	Soviet Union		
ZIS-6	Truck	Soviet Union		

=== Passenger/utility vehicles ===
Name	Type	Origin	Photo	Notes
GAZ-64	Light utility vehicle	Soviet Union		2,500 were produced during the war. The focus switched to building armoured BA-64s, with the availability of American made Jeeps.
GAZ-67	Light utility vehicle	Soviet Union		
GAZ-4	Pickup truck version of GAZ-A	Soviet Union		
GAZ-M1	Passenger car	Soviet Union		
GAZ-11-73	Six-cylinder version of GAZ-M1	Soviet Union		
GAZ-415	Pickup truck version of GAZ-M1	Soviet Union		
GAZ-61	Four-wheel-drive version of GAZ-M1	Soviet Union		
GAZ-61-416	Light artillery tractor	Soviet Union		

=== Lend-Lease vehicles ===
Name	Type	Origin	Delivery	Photo	Notes
Willys MB	Light utility vehicle	United States			
Dodge 3/4-ton WC series (Dodge 3/4)	Light military utility truck	United States	1942 – 1945: 24,902 (sent to USSR)		Dodge WC series were one of the most popular vehicles during World War II. These U.S. military four-wheel drive vehicles (weapons carriers) were supplied to USSR under a Lend-Lease program mainly in two variants – with or without front winch (WC52 and WC51). With a payload of 750 kg (3/4 t), these 4 х 4 off-road vehicles with two seater open cab, multipurpose bed and canvas cover were intermediate between jeeps and trucks.
GMC CCKW-352	6x6 Cargo truck	United States	1941 – 1943: 6,700 (sent to USSR)		6,700 GMC CCKW-352 were sent to the Soviet Union from Lend-Lease. They were short wheelbase 352 Variant

=== Motorcycles ===
Name	Type	Origin	Photo	Notes
PMZ-A-750	Heavy motorcycle	Soviet Union		The first heavy motorcycle manufactured in the Soviet Union. Used during the Winter War with unsatisfactory results.
TIZ-AM-600	Heavy motorcycle	Soviet Union		Used during the Winter War with unsatisfactory results, it was considered an outdated design.
M-72	Heavy motorcycle	Soviet Union		Motorcycle meant to replace the PMZ-A-750 and TIZ-AM-600. In the Eastern Front, motorcycles were produced at both the IMZ and GMZ motorcycle plants. All sidecars for both the M-72 and American Lend-Lease bikes were produced at the GMZ.

=== Tractors & prime movers ===
Name	Type	Origin	Photo	Notes
S-60	Tractor	Soviet Union		Heavy tractor with a strong engine meant to haul artillery.
S-65	Tractor	Soviet Union		Replacement of the S-60 for towing heavy weapons. Many of these and S-60s were captured by the German Army during their invasion.
T-20	Artillery tractor	Soviet Union		These were most often used to haul artillery, carry troops, and unintentionally as a Tankette/Gun Carrier/APC. It was used during the Winter War and the first half of World War 2. They were often captured by the German Army and fitted with Pak guns.
T-26T	Artillery tractor	Soviet Union		
Komintern	Artillery tractor	Soviet Union		
Voroshilovets	Artillery tractor	Soviet Union		
STZ-5	Prime mover	Soviet Union		
Stalinets-2	Prime mover	Soviet Union		
YA-12	Artillery tractor	Soviet Union		

== Aircraft ==
=== Fighter aircraft ===
Name	Type	Origin	Production	Photo	Notes
Yak-9	Fighter	Soviet Union	Oct. 1942 – Dec. 1948: 16,769 (14,579 during WWII)		Yak-9 was mass-produced in different variants (front-line fighters mainly, fighter-bomber, high-altitude interceptor etc.) at three Soviet large aircraft plants - in Novosibirsk, Omsk and Moscow. Yak-9 was developed from the earlier Yak-1 and Yak-7 fighters of A.S. Yakovlev Design Bureau. Used in all major World War II operations of the Red Army, starting with the Battle of Stalingrad in autumn 1942.
Yakovlev Yak-3	Fighter	Soviet Union	March 1944 – August 1946: 4,848		Introduced in 1944 as a highly lightweight and robust tactical dogfighter developed from the Yak-1M. Acclaimed for its high power-to-weight ratio and excellent low-altitude capabilities. Extensively flown by both Soviet Air Forces and the elite French Normandie-Niemen Regiment

== Navy ships ==
- List of ships of the Second World War

== Rockets and bombs ==
- RS-82 (rocket family)
- FAB-9000
- FAB-5000
- FAB-500
- FAB-250
- FAB-100
- FAB-50
- FAB-25

== See also ==
- List of World War II weapons
- List of military vehicles of World War II
- List of British military equipment of World War II
- List of equipment of the United States Army during World War II
- List of German military equipment of World War II
- List of Italian Army equipment in World War II
- List of Japanese military equipment of World War II
