= PMZ-40 mine =

Land mine

The PMZ-40 was a circular metal-cased Soviet multi-purpose landmine used during the Second World War. It was similar in design to the earlier Finnish Panssarimiina m/36 which was used during the Winter War. The mine had a serrated lower edge that allowed it to be deployed on sheet ice. The pressure plate was held over the fuse by four sheer bolts, rotating the pressure plate allows it to rest directly on the fuse, making it sensitive enough to be used as an anti-personnel mine. The mine proved to be too dangerous to use, and was replaced by the TM-41 anti-tank mine.

== Specifications ==
- Diameter: 280 mm
- Weight: 9 kg
- Explosive content: 3.6 kg of Amonal
