= M39 =

M39, M-39 or M.39 may refer to:

== Aviation ==
- Macchi M.39, an Italian racing seaplane of 1926
- Miles M.39, a 1943 British tandem wing aircraft

== Armament and military ==
- HMS Hurworth (M39), a 1985 British Royal Navy mine countermeasures vessel
- M39 Pantserwagen, an AFV of the Royal Dutch Army used in World War II
- M39 armored utility vehicle, a variant of the American M18 Hellcat tank destroyer
- M39 cannon, an American aircraft-mounted automatic cannon
- M39 rifle, a Finnish variant of the Mosin–Nagant rifle
- M39 Enhanced Marksman Rifle, a semi-automatic, gas-operated rifle
- M39 missile, a missile carried and launched from an M270 Multiple Launch Rocket System; see M270 Multiple Launch Rocket System#Rockets and missiles
- Smith & Wesson Model 39 (S&W M39), a semi-automatic pistol
- Model 39 grenade, a German hand grenade
- Panssarimiina m/39, a Finnish anti-tank mine

== Transportation ==
- M-39 (Michigan highway), a state highway in Michigan
- M39 (Cape Town), a Metropolitan Route in Cape Town, South Africa
- M39 (Johannesburg), a Metropolitan Route in Johannesburg, South Africa
- M39 (Pretoria), a Metropolitan Route in Pretoria, South Africa
- M39 (Durban), a Metropolitan Route in Durban, South Africa
- M39 highway (Kyrgyzstan), a highway connecting Kyrgyzstan to Kazakhstan
- Goulburn Valley Freeway, a freeway in Victoria, Australia

== Other ==
- M39 lens mount, a standard lens mount for cameras
- Messier 39 (M39), an open star cluster in the constellation Cygnus
