= Panssarimiina m/S-39 and m/S-40 =

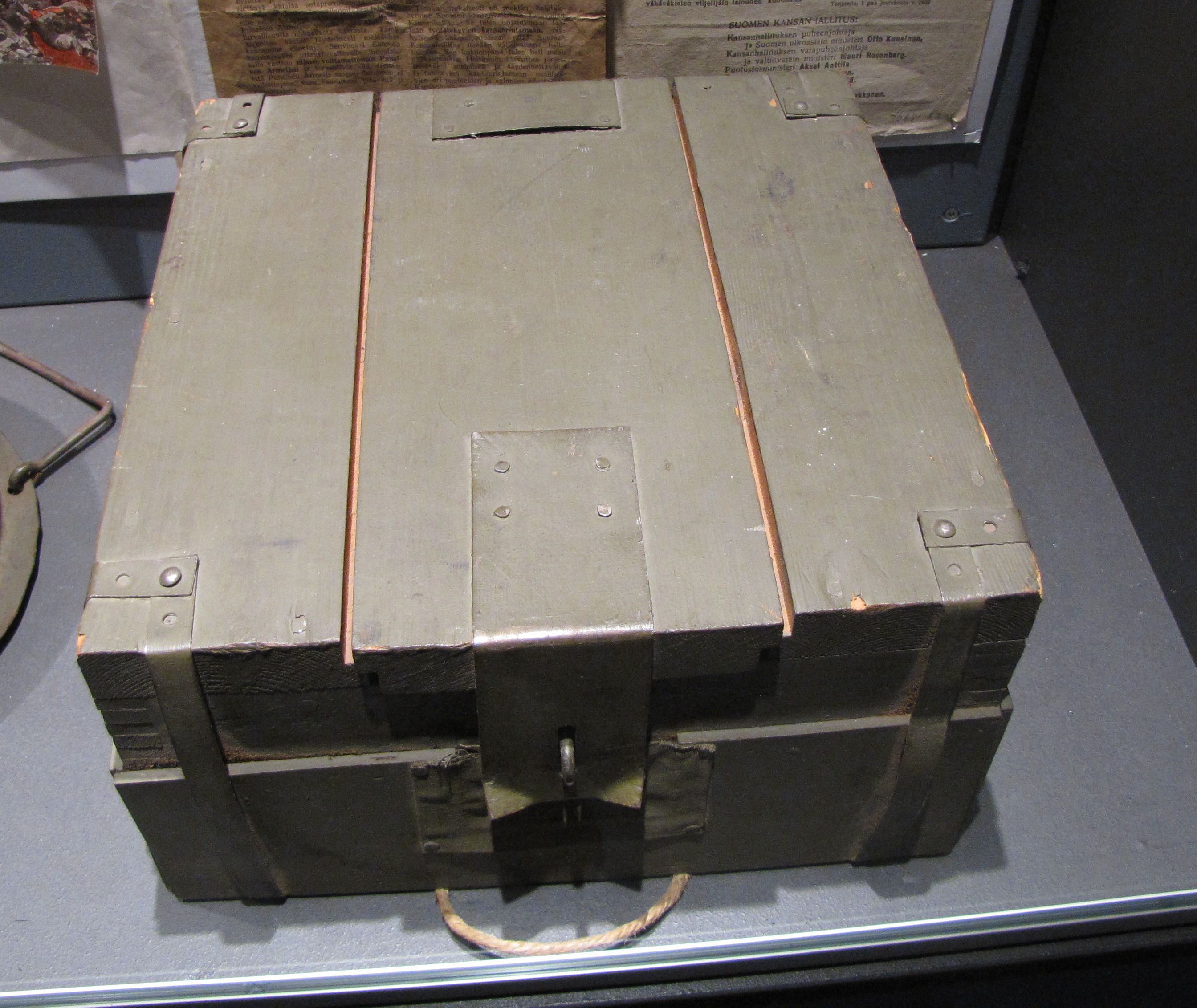
Panssarimiina m/S-39

The Panssarimiina m/S-39 and Panssarimiina m/S-40 are Finnish anti-tank blast mines used during the Winter War of 1939-1940. Russian tanks were only able to be halted by rapid production and placement of mines. Due to the demand for mines during the Winter War, a cheap, easy-to-produce mine was needed. The m/S-39 was designed by a team led by Major A. Saloranta in October 1939, and it entered production on 8 November 1939. After one week's production at furniture factories in Lahti and Helylä over 2,000 mines had been produced. By the end of the Winter War 133,000 had been delivered. The m/S-40 was an improved version of the mine that differed in detail.

The mine is a square wooden box containing a large block of explosive, the top has a thick rim over which a wooden cover is placed. When pressure on the top of the mine increases, the wooden cover collapses, pressing down on the mine and triggering it. Soldiers liked that the mines were easier to transport and handle than the Panssarimiina m/36 and Panssarimiina m/39 mines, but also found that they were not as powerful as needed. To make up for the lack of explosive power, soldiers improvised by adding 1kg of TNT under the mine, or combining several mines into one area. During the Continuation War the mines were found to be too small to reliably disable Soviet armor and long-term durability was not sufficient, so by 1943 all remaining m/S-39 & m/S-40 mines were removed from service.

== Specifications ==
- Height: 0.045 m or 0.145 m
- Length: 0.228 m or 0.308 m
- Weight: 6.5 kg to 7.5 kg
- Explosive content: 3.0 kg to 3.8 kg of TNT or Chlorate-resin
- Activated pressure: 240 kg
