= 107 mm gun M1910 =

Russian field gun

107-mm gun model 1910
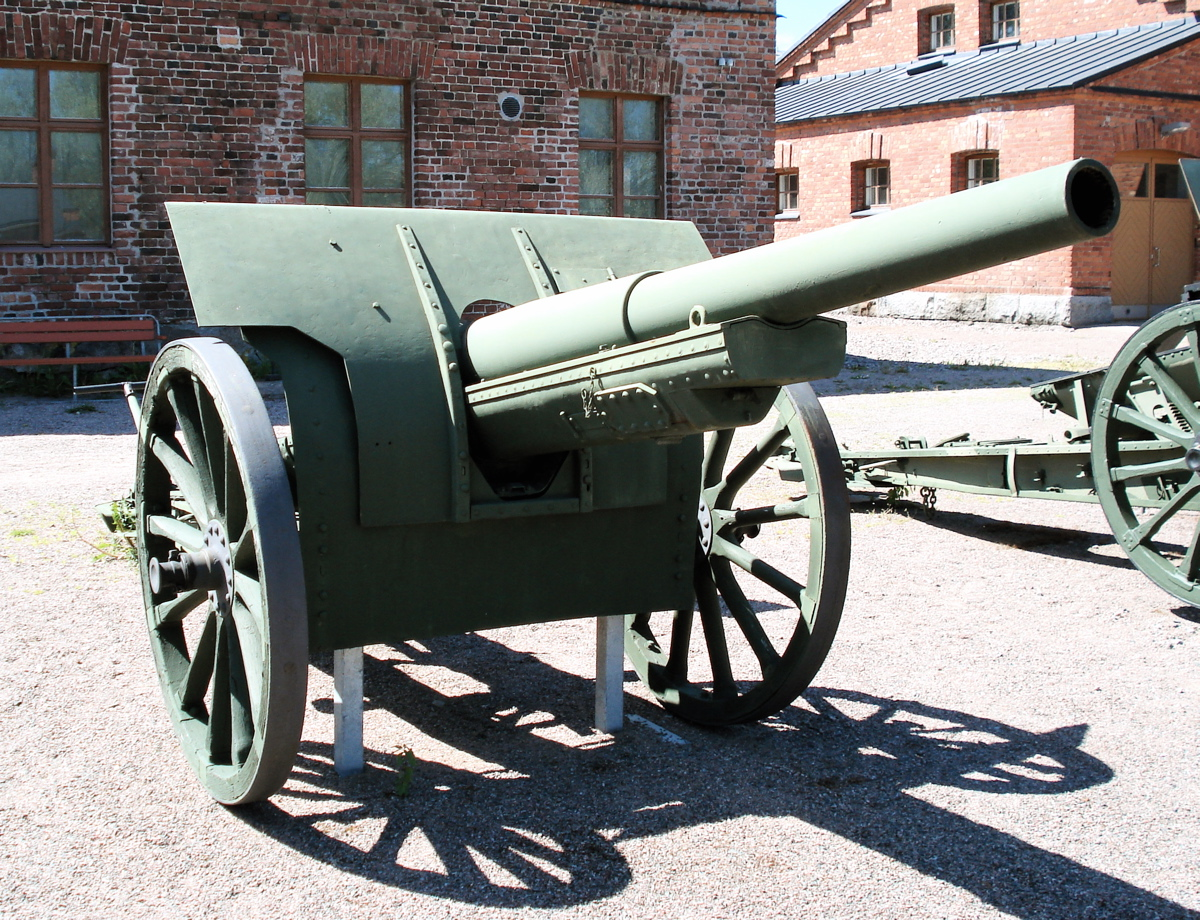
- 107-mm gun M1910, displayed in Hämeenlinna Artillery Museum.
- Type: Field gun
- Place of origin: Russian Empire

Service history
- Used by: Russian Empire; Soviet Union; Finland; Romania
- Wars: World War I Russian Civil War; Winter War

Production history
- Designer: Schneider
- Manufacturer: Putilov
- No. built: 724?

Specifications
- Mass: 2,172 kg (4,788 lbs)
- Barrel length: 2.9 m (9 ft 6 in) L/28
- Shell: Fixed Quick Fire
- Caliber: 107 mm (4.21 in)
- Breech: interrupted screw
- Recoil: Hydro-pneumatic
- Carriage: fixed trail
- Elevation: -5° to 37°
- Traverse: +3° -3°
- Rate of fire: 5 rpm
- Muzzle velocity: 296 - 630 m/s (971 - 2066 ft/s)
- Maximum firing range: 12.5 km (7.76 mi)

107-mm gun model 1910 (Russian: 107-мм пушка образца 1910 года) was a Russian field gun developed in the years before the First World War. It also saw service during the Russian Civil War, Winter War and Second World War. The gun was initially developed and produced by the French arms manufacturer Schneider, but was later built by the Putilovski and Obukhov plants in Saint Petersburg.

== History ==
In the early 20th century, the French company Schneider gained a controlling interest in the Putilov plant in St. Petersburg Russia. Among the projects at the time was a 107 mm field gun, which was supposed to replace older 107 mm and 152 mm guns then in service. The official designation was 42-line field gun Model 1910 (1 "line" = 1/10 inch or 2.54 mm, thus 42 lines = 106.68 mm). Schneider also built a 105 mm version called the Canon de 105 mle 1913 Schneider for the French Army and export customers.

It is estimated a total of 338 Model 1910 guns were produced in France by Schneider. In July 1912 a contract was signed by the Putilovsky Plant for the production of 100 Model 1910 guns a year with a deadline of October 1917. By November 1919, 174 guns had been completed. An additional 400 guns were ordered from the Obukhov Plant in June 1915, with a deadline of April 1919. Between 1916 and 1924 the Obukhov Plant completed 212 guns.

In 1913 there were 19 heavy artillery batteries of Model 1910 guns in service. At the beginning of World War I there were 76 guns in service and 8 in reserve. In addition, there were another 23 in service at five European fortresses. In June 1917, there were 189 Model 1910 guns in service on all fronts except for the Caucasian front, where no Model 1910 guns were in service.

In 1930 the Model 1910 was modernized and re-designated as the M1910/30. The modifications included a longer barrel, longer propellant chamber, separate loading ammunition and longer range. However, shortcomings such as lack of motor traction, limited traverse, and limited elevation remained unresolved. Therefore, a new 107 mm gun the M1940 (M-60) was developed to replace it. The Germans assigned the M1910 the designation 10.7 cm Kanone 351(r), but it is not known if they made use of any captured examples.

36 pieces were abandoned in Romania after Russia made peace with the Central Powers in 1918. They were put into service by the Romanian Army, equipping heavy artillery units in the period 1920-1940.

== Finnish Use ==
During the Finnish Civil War, a few Finnish Red Guard artillery units were armed with M1910 guns and Finnish White Guard units captured 3 guns during the war: two in Helsinki and one in Vyborg. After the war Finland acquired 8 more guns: 4 from France, 2 from Poland and 2 from Latvia, increasing the total number in service to 11 guns. 2 guns were French manufactured and designated as 107 K/13, while the remaining 9 were Russian manufactured and received the designation 107 K/10.

These guns comprised the core Finnish heavy artillery since they were the only heavy guns available at that time. During the Winter War, 10 guns formed the 1st Heavy Artillery Battalion, but an acute shortage of ammunition forced the Finns to withdraw them from service in February 1940 and were replaced by twelve 105 K/13 guns purchased from France. From 1941–1944 these guns were assigned to the 29th and 30th Heavy Artillery Battalions. In 1943, four 107 K/10 guns were converted to fire 105 mm ammunition and re-designated 105 K/10. Despite the widespread use of captured weapons by the Finnish Army, no Model 1910/30 guns were captured during the war.
