= Panssarimiina m/39 =

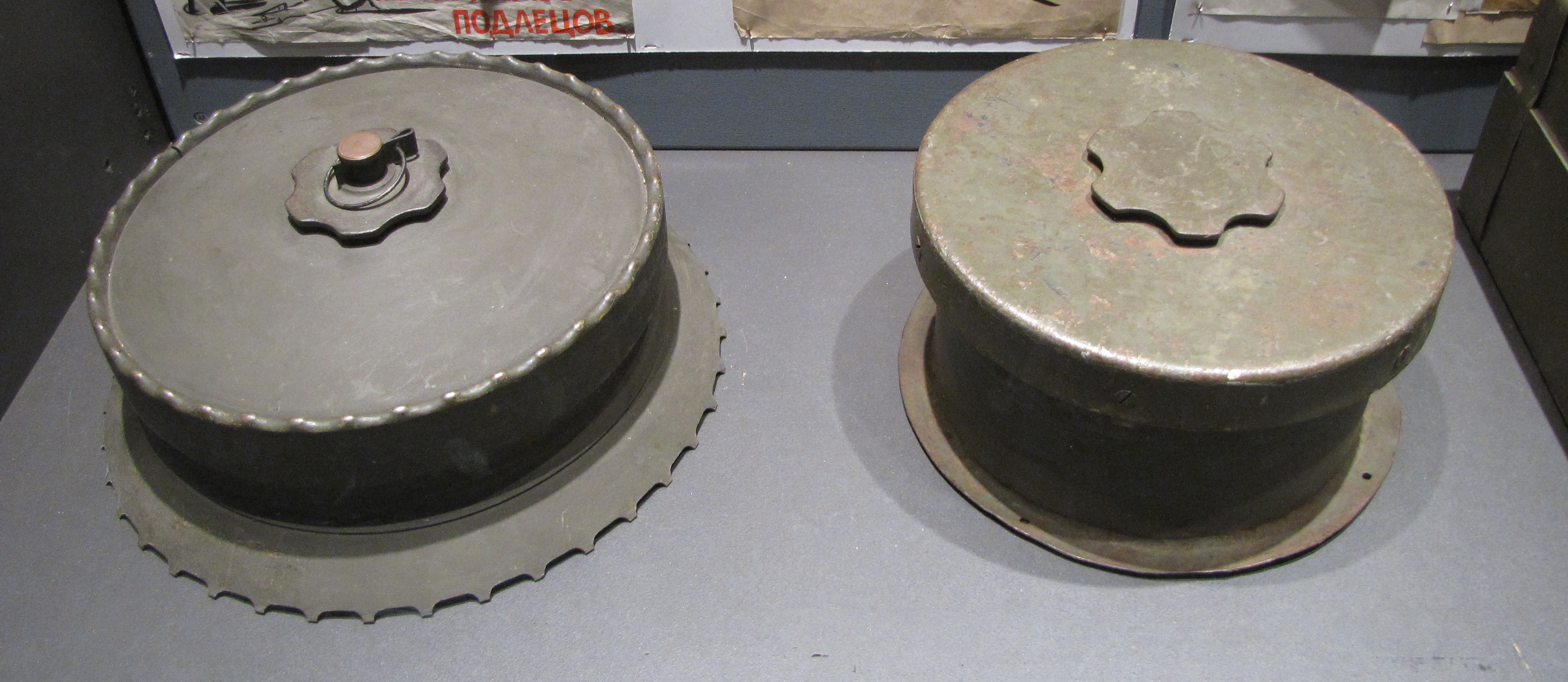
Panssarimiina m/39 shown on the right

The Panssarimiina m/39 is a Finnish anti-tank blast mine used during the Winter War, Second World War and Continuation War. The mine was first developed by Major General Arvo Saloranta in October 1939, it superseded the Panssarimiina m/36 in service with the Finnish Army. It was first delivered in December 1939 while the Winter War was taking place. Though it was simpler to produce than the earlier m/36 it was still too complicated, and supply was outstripped by demand. This spawned the rapid design and development of the wooden Panssarimiina m/S-39 which could be largely produced without the use of metal working machinery.

The mine proved to have too little explosive content to reliably break the tracks of the latest Russian tanks, so during the Winter War a supplemental 1kg charge of TNT was placed under the mine. During the Continuation War, two different purpose-built charges were issued. The first consisted of 2.5 kg of TNT in a metal box, and the second was either a Soviet TM-35 mine or TM-38 mine with the fuse and lid removed. Where these supplemental charges were not available a second mine was buried under the first. In 1943 the Finnish Army had noted that the fuses on the m/39 had started rusting and had become unreliable, so they were recalled for inspection and repair.

== Specifications ==
- Height: 0.12 m
- Diameter: 0.227 m
- Weight: 7 kg
- Explosive content: 3.2 kg of TNT or Amatol
- Operating pressure: 280 to 200 kg
