= TMD-40 mine =

Anti-tank mine

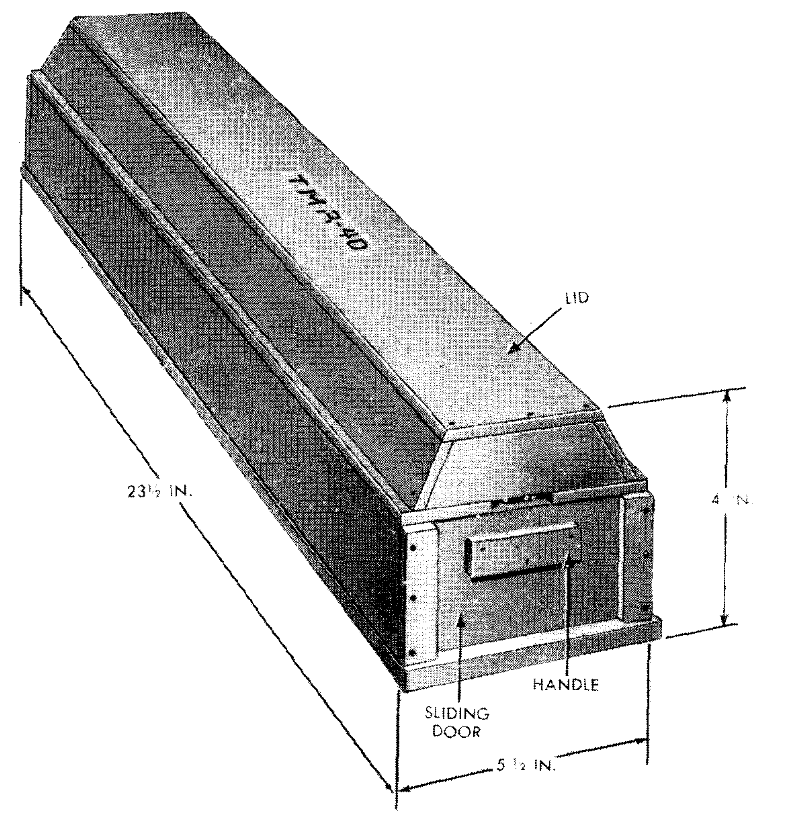
A TMD-40 mine.

The TMD-40 was a wooden-cased Soviet anti-tank blast mine used during the Second World War. The mine consisted of a rectangular wooden box which contained a detonator assembly at each end and seven 400 gram and four 200 gram blocks of explosive. The fuse assemblies consisted of a lever device, which when pressed downward by pressure pieces attached to the lid of the mine, see-sawed upward, pulling the striker retaining pin from a pull detonator. The main charge was then triggered.

It was first employed in 1940 as a substitute for the similar TM-39 mine due to a shortage of metal and industrial capacity required for its production. The mine was produced in massive quantities until 1942 when the YaM-5, a more compact and efficient substitute, was adopted by the red army, which shifted focus from the TMD-40. Production was completely halted in 1943 with the TMD-44 and TMD-B mines making the TMD-40 obsolete. However some mines produced were still in use up until the end of the war in 1945.

== Specifications ==
- Weight: 5 kg or 6.9 kg depending on source
- Explosive content: 3.2 kg TNT
- Height: 10 cm approx
- Length: 60 cm approx
- Operating pressure: 80 to 250 kg depending on source

== See also ==
- TMD-44 and TMD-B mines
