= PE scope =

PE
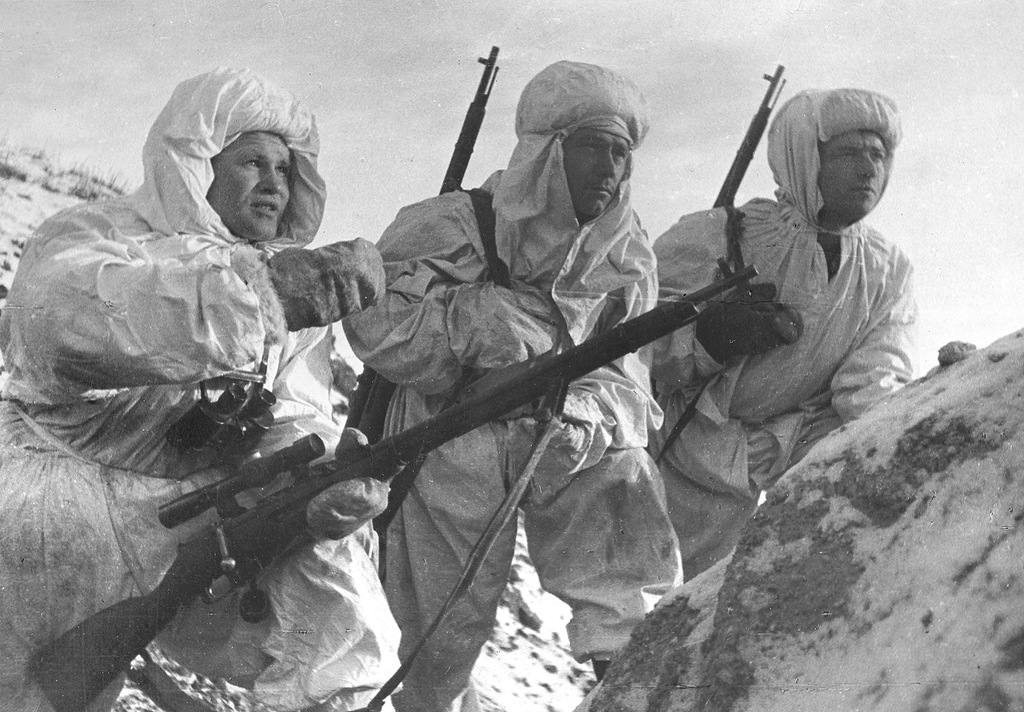
- Mosin rifle with a PE scope in the hands of Vasily Zaitsev (December 1942, Stalingrad)
- Type: Telescopic sight
- Place of origin: Soviet Union

Service history
- In service: 1931–?
- Used by: Soviet Union
- Wars: World War II

Production history
- Designer: LOMO
- Designed: 1931
- Manufacturer: Leningrad factory No.357
- Produced: 1931–1940

The PE scope (Russian: Винтовочный оптический прицел образца 1931 г. or ПЕ, often called Прицел Емельянова, or Yemelyanov's sight or Прицел Единый or Standard sight) is a family of Soviet telescopic sights, used from 1930s onwards on Mosin-Nagant sniper rifles, as well as SVT and AVS rifles. It was later superseded by PU scope.

== History ==
The sight was developed by LOMO (then called All-Union Association of Optical-Mechanical Industry) to replace the PT optical sight; The main goal of modernization was the introduction of mechanisms for horizontal and vertical corrections. Approval for gross production at plant No. 19 took place on November 13, 1931, the PE code was assigned by order from May 13, 1933. During 1932, the PE sight system underwent several changes, mainly to the adjustment unit and to the shape of the lens tube. By the beginning of 1933, development of the PE design was completed, and there were so many innovations that the plant tried to report on the creation of a "sight of the 1932 model", but such an initiative was not supported by management. Due to the presence of the factory mark "UVP" and the inscription "V. P obr. 1931", the PE sight in the 1930s was often mistakenly called the VP or UVP sight.

== Production ==
Production was first established at the Krasnogorsk plant No. 19, then transferred to the Leningrad "Progress" plant (plant No. 357 of the People's Commissariat of Armaments of the USSR), and then expanded to the Kharkov Labor Commune plant of the NKVD of the USSR. All products were supplied to Tula (plant No. 173), where the country's only production of sniper rifles based on the Mosin and SVT systems was located. Brackets, dust caps and canvas covers were also manufactured there. Mounting of the PE sight on Mosin rifles was carried out using a Smirnsky bracket, similar to the PT sight.

In 1940, all enterprises switched to producing a more advanced PU sight, but during the war the production of PE sights was resumed.

In total, about 46,500 PE sights were produced in Krasnogorsk and Leningrad in 1931–1937, and about 120 thousand were produced in Leningrad and Kharkov in 1942–43.

== Description ==
The optical system, consisting of nine lenses, was borrowed from the developments of the Zeiss company and tested on the Soviet PT sight. The design of the diopter adjustment and lateral adjustment mechanisms was similar to the Visar 5 sight from the Bush company.

Criticism was caused by poor sealing of the aiming tube and an unreliable focusing mechanism. In addition, it was noted that the reticle of the PE sight provided little feedback for the shooter.

== Technical characteristics ==
- Magnification factor: ×3.87
- Field of view: 5.5°
- Exit pupil diameter: 7.6 mm
- Lens speed: 59.3
- Eye relief: 85 mm
- Focus range: from 3 to +2

== Combat use ==
It was actively used by the Red Army on the battlefields of the Great Patriotic War. German and Finnish troops also used captured PE sights, not only with standard Soviet sniper rifles, but also with weapons of their own production. To do this, in some cases, the sights were subjected to quite radical alterations.

In July 1943, comparative tests of PE, PU and captured German sights were carried out, based on the results of which it was concluded that the PU was not inferior to the PE in combat properties, and significantly superior to it in terms of weight, size, technology and performance.
