= TM-44 mine =

Anti-tank mine

The TM-44 was a circular metal-cased Soviet anti-tank landmine used during the Second World War. The mine's case consisted of a short cylinder with the entire top surface being used as a pressure plate. The mine was normally painted olive drab and was broadly similar to the earlier, smaller, TM-41 mine.

The earlier TM-41 was used widely between 1941 and 1942, but production was discontinued because of the lack of metal available to Soviet industry. By 1944 the situation had improved and production of metal mines resumed. The TM-44 is similar to the earlier mine, weighing more with a larger charge.

140 to 260 kilograms of pressure on the top pressure plate resulted in it bending downwards and pressing on the MV-5 fuze. One to three kilograms of pressure on the head of the fuze was sufficient to activate it. The fuze's lock balls are forced out of position by the pressure, releasing a striker, which triggers a detonator, then a booster and then the mine's main charge. The mine was used with anti-handling devices.

Production of the mine ceased in 1946 with the adoption of the TM-46 mine, which was modelled on German Tellermine designs.

The mine was prone to rusting, exposing the MV-5 fuze which could be triggered by as little as 1 to 3 kilograms of pressure. It is found in Yemen.

== Specifications ==
- Diameter: 254 mm
- Height: 140 mm
- Weight: 7.7 kg
- Explosive content: 5.4 kg of Amatol
