= PU scope =

Soviet small arms telescopic sight

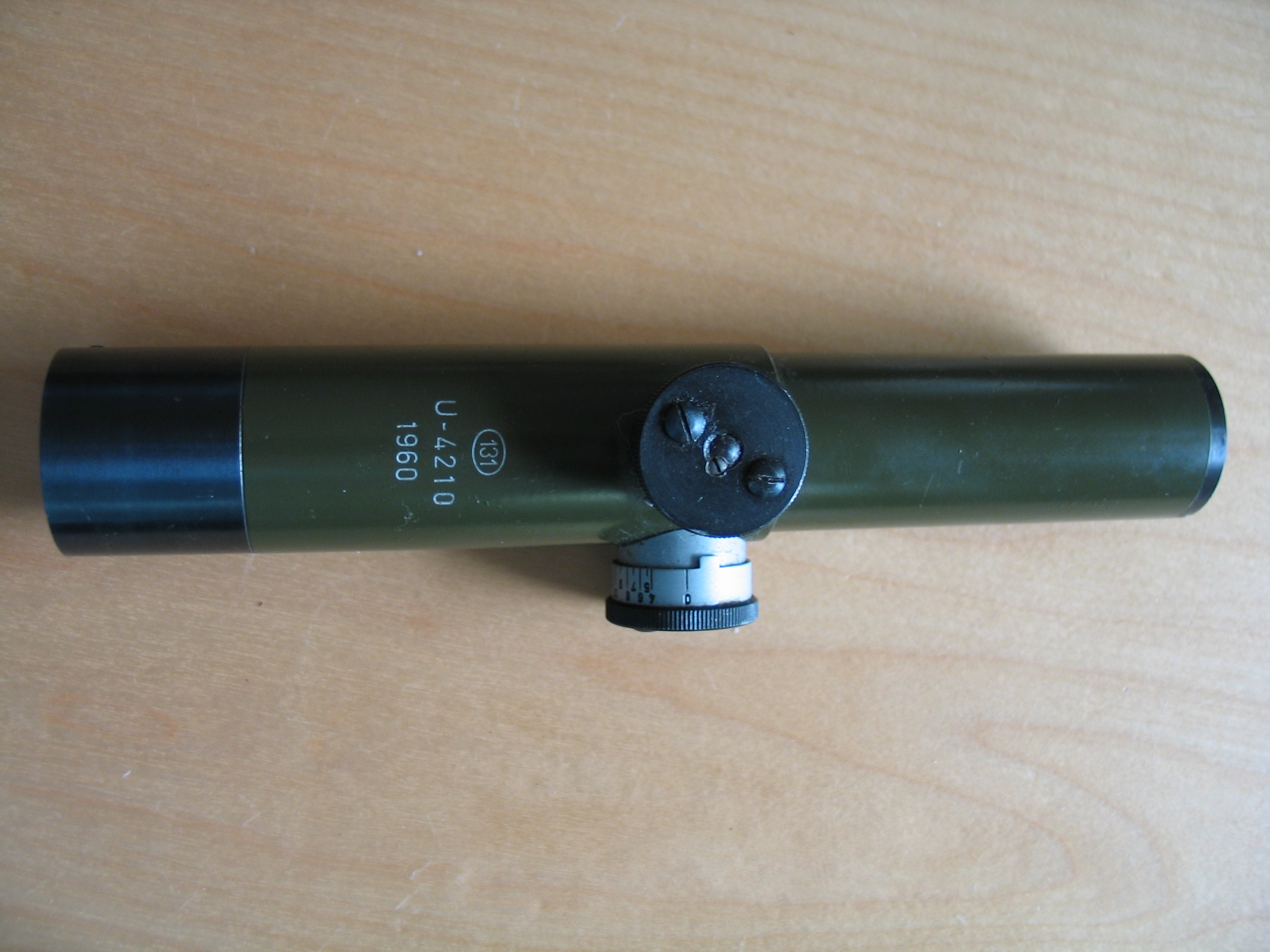
PU telescopic sight from above

The PU scope (ПУ, прицел укороченный, 'Scope short-cut' in comparison to PE/PEM telescopic sight) is a 3.5×21 telescopic sight of Soviet manufacture, widely used since 1940 on the SVT-40 rifle for which it was originally designed and since 1942 on the Mosin–Nagant rifle. Before converting the PU for Mosin–Nagant Model 1891/30 sniper rifles these rifles used 3.87×30 PE(M) telescopic sights, a Soviet-made copy of a German Zeiss design, while later rifles used smaller, simpler, and easier-to-produce 3.5×21 PU telescopic sights. The PU telescopic sight has a fixed at 3.5 power magnification. The reticle could be adjusted vertically for range, and the elevation turret is graduated from 0–1,300 m (0–1,422 yd) in 100 m (109 yd) increments. The bullet drop compensation (BDC) adjustment in the elevation turret is free spinning under grease friction. The windage adjustment turret of the telescopic sight features more conventional click adjustments in milliradian increments. The design turned out to be so successful and in demand that production was not stopped after World War II and the sight was converted for and used on other small arms.

While it has been claimed that Soviet optical instrument makers attempted to create a 6× version of the telescopic sight, this has been refuted. An after-market objective lens, known as the PU Magnifier (PUM), is able to give the PU telescopic sight a 6.5× power.

== Technical specifications ==
- Magnification: 3.5×
- Objective diameter: 21 mm
- Field of view: 4° 30′
- Exit pupil: 6 mm
- Eye relief: 72 mm
- Limiting optical resolution: 17 SOA
- Weight: 0.27 kg
- Length: 169 mm

== Gallery ==
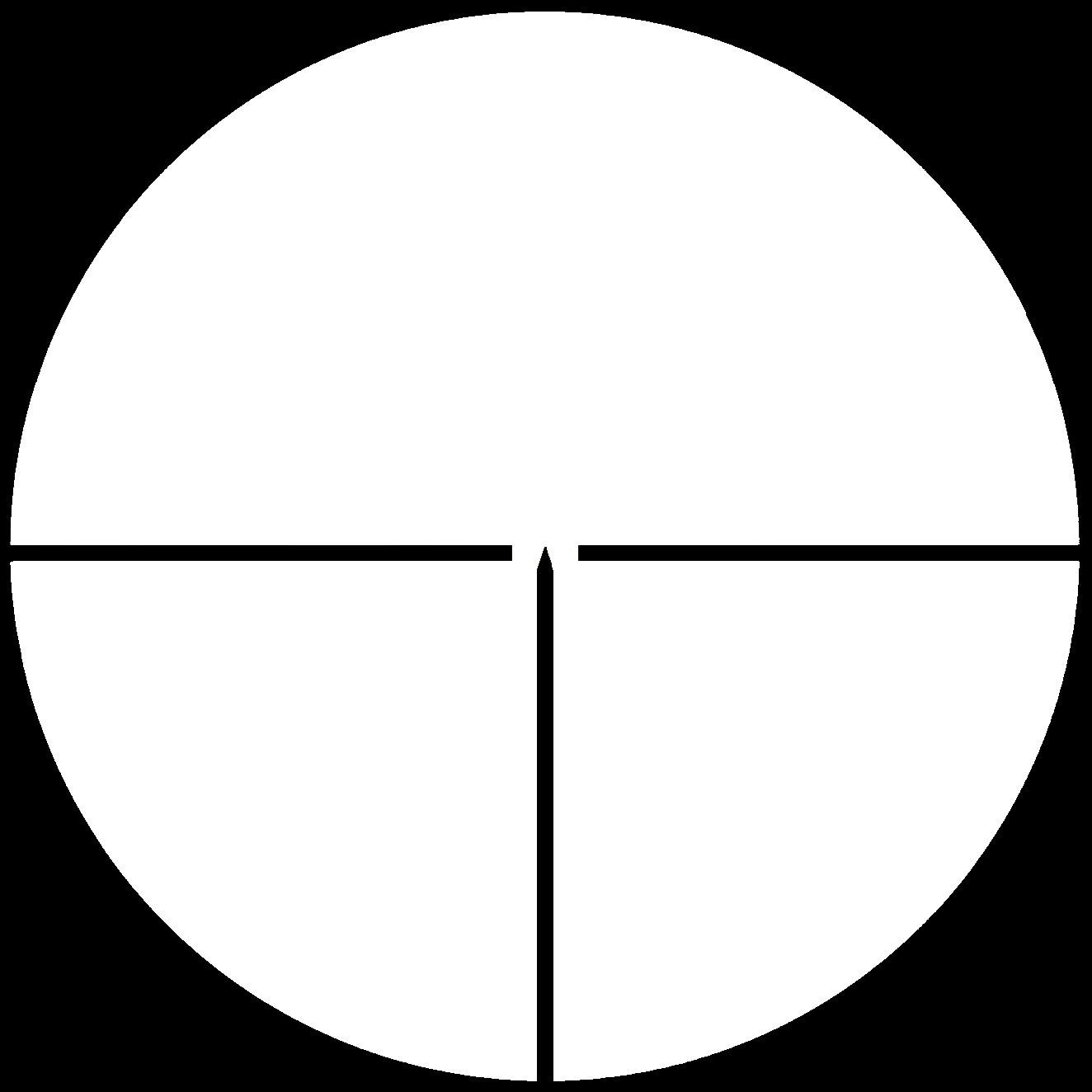
The PU 'German style' reticle

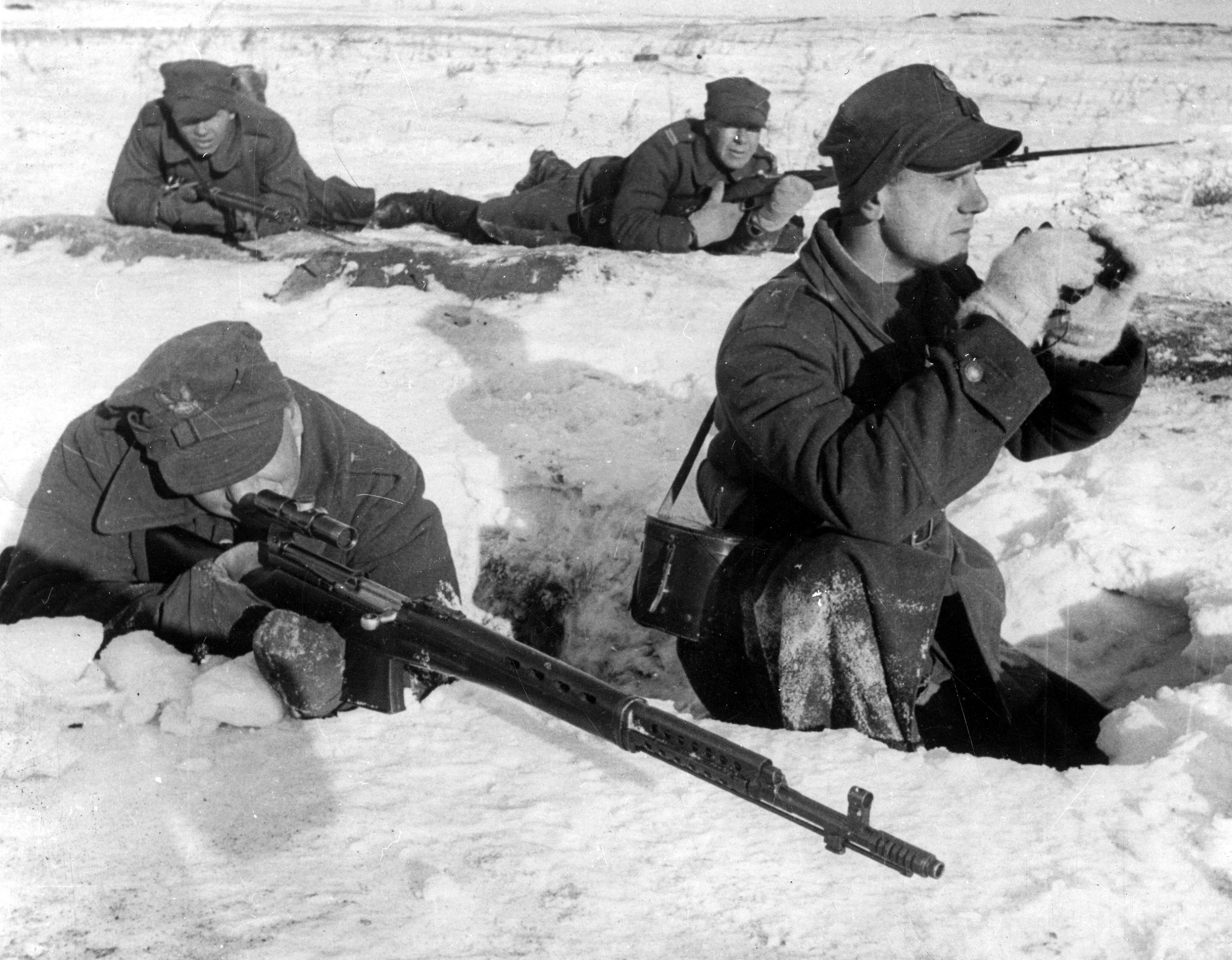
Russian SVT-40 semi-automatic battle rifle with PU 3.5×21 sight

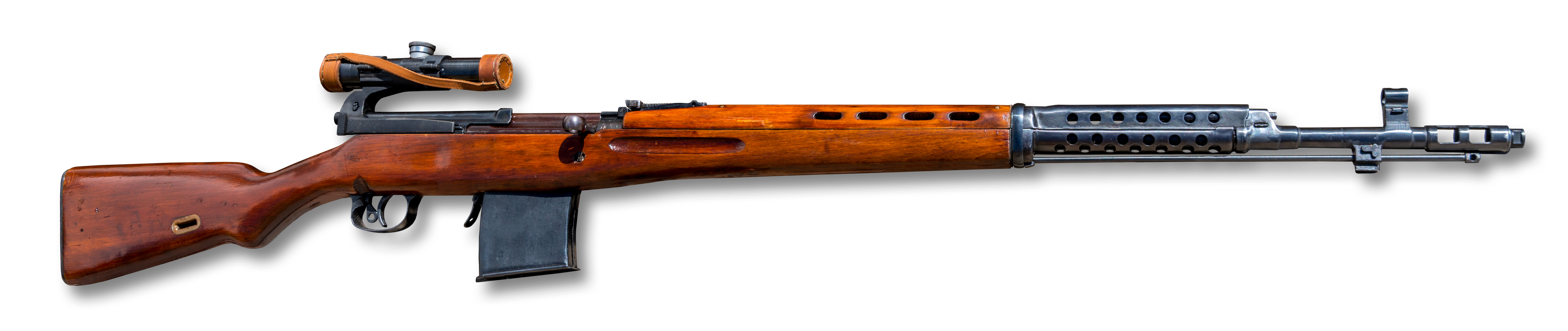
A 1941 Tula SVT-40 with PU 3.5×21 sight in original sniper configuration

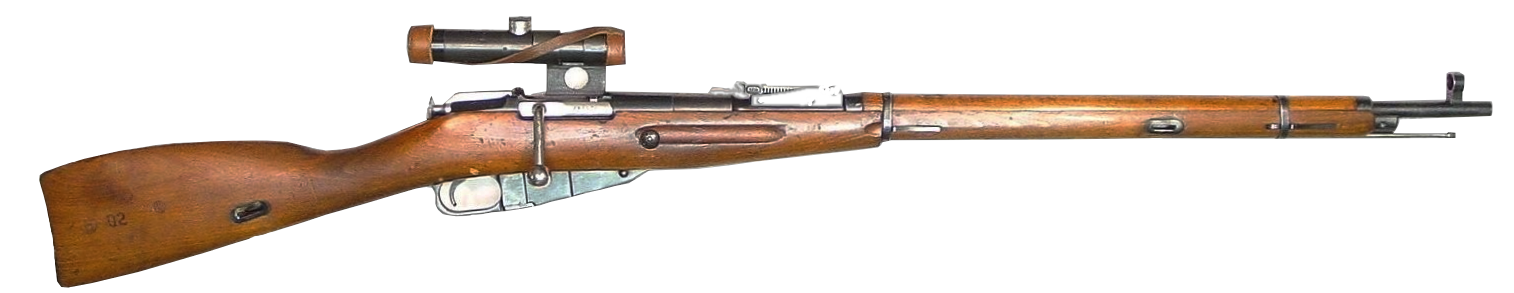
Russian Model 1891/30 sniper rifle with PU 3.5×21 sight

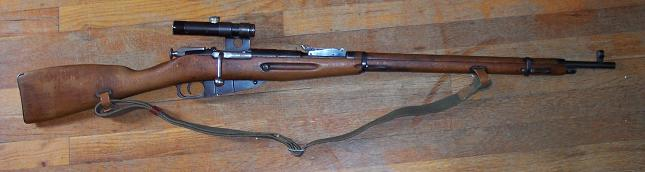
Hungarian M/52 sniper rifle with PU 3.5×21 sight

== See also ==
- PE scope
