= 107 mm gun M1910/30 =

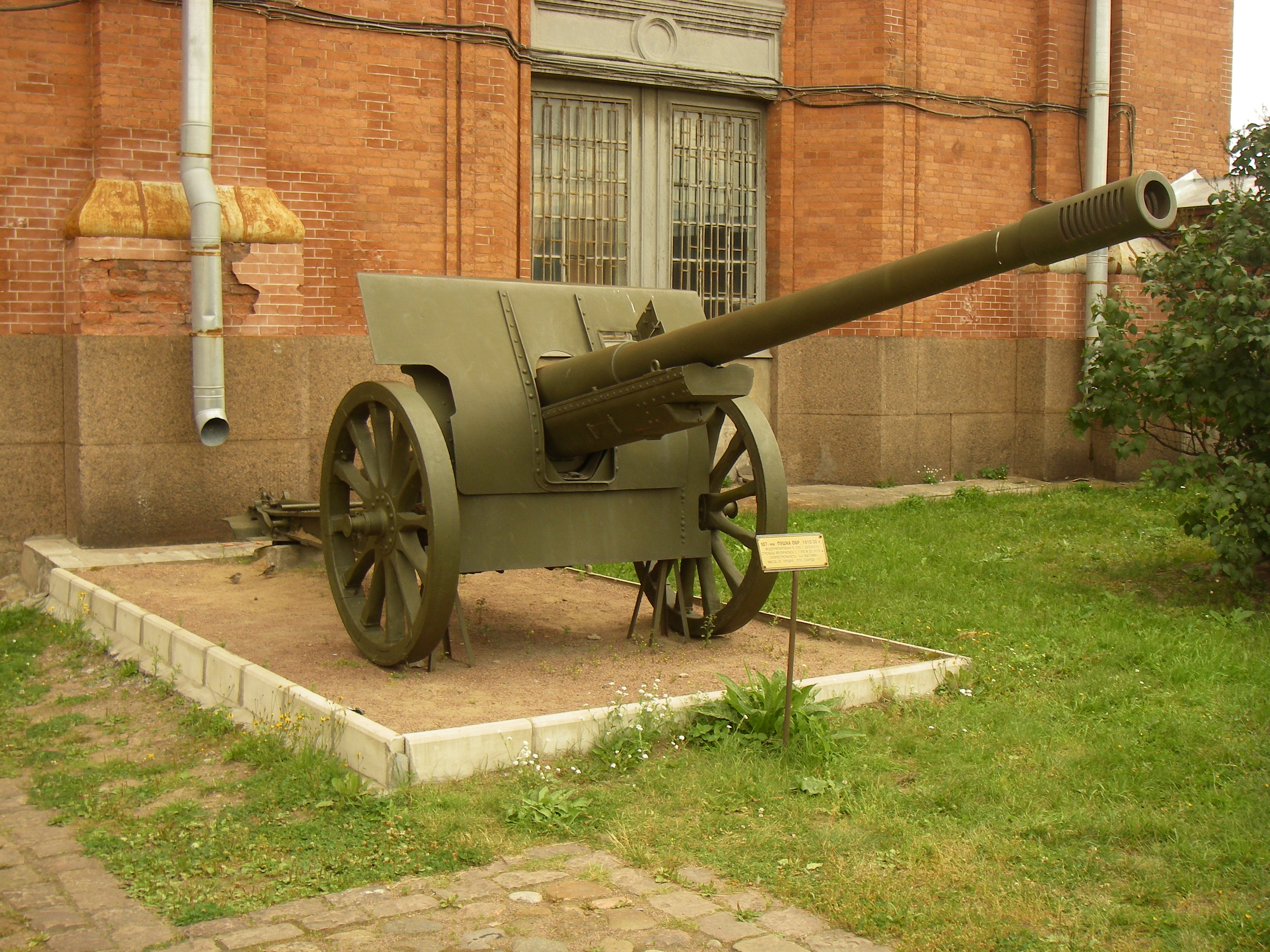
- M1910/30 in the Artillery Museum, Saint Petersburg.
- Type: field gun
- Place of origin: USSR

Production history
- Designer: KB NTK GAU
- Manufacturer: Bolshevik, Barrikady
- Produced: 1931-1935
- No. built: 828+

Specifications
- Mass: Combat: 2,535 kg (5,589 lbs); Travel: 3,000 kg (6,614 lbs)
- Length: 7.53 metres (24 ft 8 in)
- Barrel length: Bore: 3.9 m (12 ft 10 in) L/36.6; Overall: 4.05 m (13 ft 3 in) L/38 (without muzzle brake)
- Width: 2.06 metres (6 ft 9 in)
- Height: 1.74 metres (5 ft 9 in)
- Crew: 8
- Shell: 106.7 x 420mmR; Separate loading charge and projectile
- Caliber: 106.7 mm (4.21 in)
- Breech: interrupted screw
- Recoil: hydro-pneumatic
- Carriage: box trail
- Elevation: -5° to 37°
- Traverse: 6°
- Rate of fire: 5-6 rounds per minute
- Effective firing range: 16,130 m (17,640 yds)

107 mm gun M1910/30 (Russian: 107-мм пушка образца 1910/30 годов, romanized: pushka obraztsa M1910/1930 godov, English: "Cannon Model of 1910 / year of 1930") was a Soviet 106.7 mm field gun.

The gun was based on an artillery piece originally developed by the French arms manufacturer Schneider prior to World War I and used by the Russian Empire as the 107 mm gun M1910. The modernized variant, adopted in 1931, differed from the original design mainly by having a larger chamber and longer barrel, resulting in longer range. The M1910/30 remained in production until the mid-1930s and was employed by the Red Army in World War II, mainly in corps artillery and Reserve of the Main Command units.

A number of captured guns were used by the Wehrmacht.

== Development and production ==
From the late 1920s the RKKA sought to upgrade its First World War era artillery pieces. One of the modernized weapons was the 107 mm gun M1910, originally designed by the French arms manufacturer Schneider. Modernization projects were submitted by Orudiyno-Arsenalny Trest (OAT) and by the design bureau of the Scientific and Technical Committee of the Main Directorate of Artillery (KB NTK GAU). After trials it was decided to adopt the weapon designed by KB NTK GAU, but to fit it with an equilibrating counterweight as used in the OAT project. The modernized weapon was adopted in 1931 as the 107 mm gun M1910/30.

The upgrade included the following:

- The barrel was lengthened by 10 calibers and fitted with a muzzle brake;
- The chamber was lengthened;
- Separate cartridge loading was introduced;
- There were changes in the recuperator, cradle and elevation mechanism.

The weapon was manufactured by the Bolshevik Plant in Leningrad and by the Barrikady Plant in Stalingrad from 1931 until 1935 or later. Additionally, a number of M1910 pieces were upgraded by Bolshevik, No 7, No 13 and KKZ plants.

== Description ==
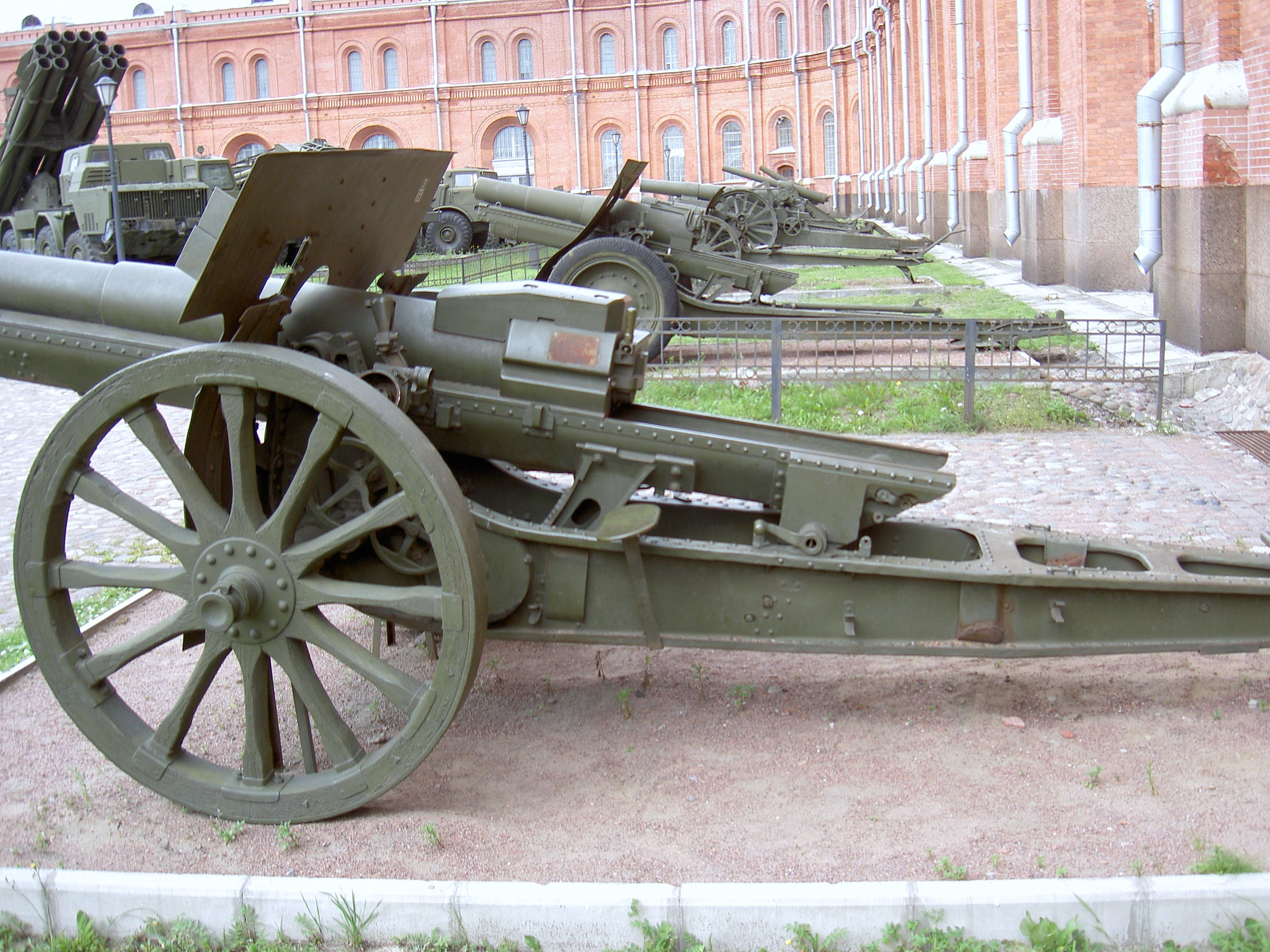
M1910/30, left side view

The barrel of the M1910/30 was longer than the original barrel and was fitted with a slotted muzzle brake (which reduced recoil by 25%); in order to balance the barrel, a special weight was fitted to the opposite end of the tube. The breech was of the interrupted screw type. The recoil system, consisting of a hydraulic recoil buffer and a hydro-pneumatic recuperator, was located in a sleigh below the barrel.

The box trail carriage was nearly identical to that of the M1910. It had either unsprung wooden wheels or metal wheels with solid rubber tires. With wooden wheels, the speed of transportation was limited to about 6 km/h. A team of eight horses was needed to tow the gun; another six towed an ammunition box with 42 rounds.

== Organization and service ==
=== Red Army ===
The M1910/30 guns were issued to corps artillery. In 1941, three variants of corps artillery regiments existed:

- Two battalions of 152 mm howitzer-guns M1937 (ML-20) (24 pieces) and one battalion of 107 mm guns (12 pieces).
- Two battalions of ML-20 (24 pieces) and two battalions of 122 mm guns or 107 mm guns (24 pieces).
- Three battalions of ML-20 (36 pieces).

In September 1941 rifle corps of the RKKA were disbanded, therefore corps level artillery ceased to exist. 107 mm guns were then issued to Reserve of the Main Command units, in 12, 18 or 24-piece gun regiments or 36-piece gun brigades.

When corps level was reintroduced in 1943, most 107 mm pieces were again given to corps artillery. New corps artillery regiments had 16-20 pieces and along with 107 mm guns included 122 mm guns and 152 mm howitzers.

Many 107 mm guns were also used by the independent artillery regiments of fortified regions and by independent battalions and batteries belonging to fronts and armies.

The M1910/30 were used by the Red Army in the Battle of Khalkhin Gol, where four pieces were lost. They also saw action in the Winter War (12 pieces in the 7th Army, 24 in the 467th Artillery Regiment of the 8th Army, 12 in the 51st Artillery Regiment of the 9th Army), apparently without losses.

In June 1941, according to different sources, the Red Army possessed 828 (including four belonging to the navy) or 863 pieces of this type. 474 107 mm guns, including a limited numbers of the new M-60, belonged to western military districts. Many were lost at the beginning of the Great Patriotic War. In 1943, the RKKA had at least 490 107 mm guns of all models, the majority of them M1910/30; some remained in service until the end of the war.

A surviving piece can be seen in the Artillery Museum in Saint Petersburg.

=== Wehrmacht ===
A number of M1910/30 guns were captured by the Wehrmacht and pressed into service in both field and coastal artillery. In German service, the gun was designated the 10,7 cm K 352(r). In March 1944, the Wehrmacht still possessed 17 pieces, all on the Eastern Front.

== Summary ==
The modernization of the M1910/30 gave the Red Army a relatively lightweight, reliable corps artillery piece with improved range and a wide array of ammunition. On the other side, it failed to address other drawbacks of the weapon. Because of its unsprung wheels, the M1910/30 was unsuitable for high-speed transportation. A very small traverse of 6 degrees limited the effectiveness of the gun against enemy tanks, despite decent armor penetration.

For the sake of comparison, the standard German 105 mm gun, the 10.5 cm sK 18, surpassed the M1910/30 in range (19 km, or 21 km for a modernized K 18/40), traverse (60 degrees) and transportation speed (up to 40 km/h). This, however, came at a price of a much larger weight of about six tons.

In 1940, the RKKA adopted a more modern 107 mm gun, the M-60. Although originally intended - and officially designated - as a divisional gun, in practice the M-60 was never used by rifle divisions; from 1943 it mainly served in the reintroduced corps artillery. However, soon after the outbreak of war, production of the M-60 was stopped. In 1943 another 107 mm gun, the 9S-1, was developed, but it was never adopted, leaving the M1910/30 the last mass production 107 mm piece in Red Army service.

== Ammunition ==
The gun fired separately loaded, cased charge ammunition. Two different charges – full and reduced – were used. Use of the full charge was prohibited with the muzzle brake removed, or with old high-explosive ammunition, shrapnel and smoke rounds.

The explosion of the OF-420 shell, with the fuse set to the fragmentation action, resulted in damage to 90% of targets in the 6 to 14 meters area and to 50% of targets in a 20 to 42 meter area. When the fuse was set to high-explosive action, the shell made a crater 1–1.5 m in diameter and 40–60 cm deep in an average soil.

The shrapnel shell contained more than 600 bullets and covered an area about 800 m long and 45–50 m wide.

Ammunition available
Type	Model	Weight, kg	HE weight, kg	Muzzle velocity, m/s	Range, m
Armor-piercing
APCBC	B-420	18.71	0.44	655	3,000
High-explosive and fragmentation projectiles
HE-frag, long range, steel	OF-420	17.2	2.15	670	16,130
HE-frag	OF-420U	17.4	2.01	670	16,130
HE	F-420U	16.54	1.8	581 (reduced charge)	14,150
HE, old	F-422L	16.41	1.56	580 (reduced charge)	11,220
HE, old	F-422K	16.41	1.54	580 (reduced charge)	11,220
HE, old	F-422M	16.41	1.7	580 (reduced charge)	11,220
Shrapnel projectiles
Shrapnel with 45 sec tube	Sh-422	16.54-17.25	0.44	579 (reduced charge)	9,400
Shrapnel with T-6 tube	Sh-422T	16.44	0.44	579 (reduced charge)	10,700
Smoke projectiles
Smoke	D-422U	16.73	0.32/1.76	580 (reduced charge)	11,220
Incendiary projectiles
Incendiary, with T-6 / T-7 tube	Z-420	17.2	0.035/1.6	670	10,800 (15,000)
Incendiary, with T-6 / T-7 tube	Z-420	16,37	0,035/1,6	680	10,180 (15,260)
Chemical projectiles
Frag-chemical	OH-420	17.2		670	16,130
Chemical	HS-420	16.9		670	16,130
Chemical with "NOV"	HN-422	16.4		580 (reduced charge)	11,220
Chemical with "SOV"	HS-422	16.4	0.35/1.7	580 (reduced charge)	11,220

Armor penetration table
APCBC projectile B-420
Distance, m	Meet angle 60°, mm	Meet angle 90°, mm
100	95	117
250	93	115
500	90	111
750	87	107
1,000	84	103
1,500	78	95
2,000	72	89
2,500	67	82
3,000	62	76
This data was obtained by Soviet methodics of armour penetration measurement (penetration probability 75%). It is not directly comparable with western data of similar type.
