= Panssarimiina m/36 =

Finnish anti-tank blast mine

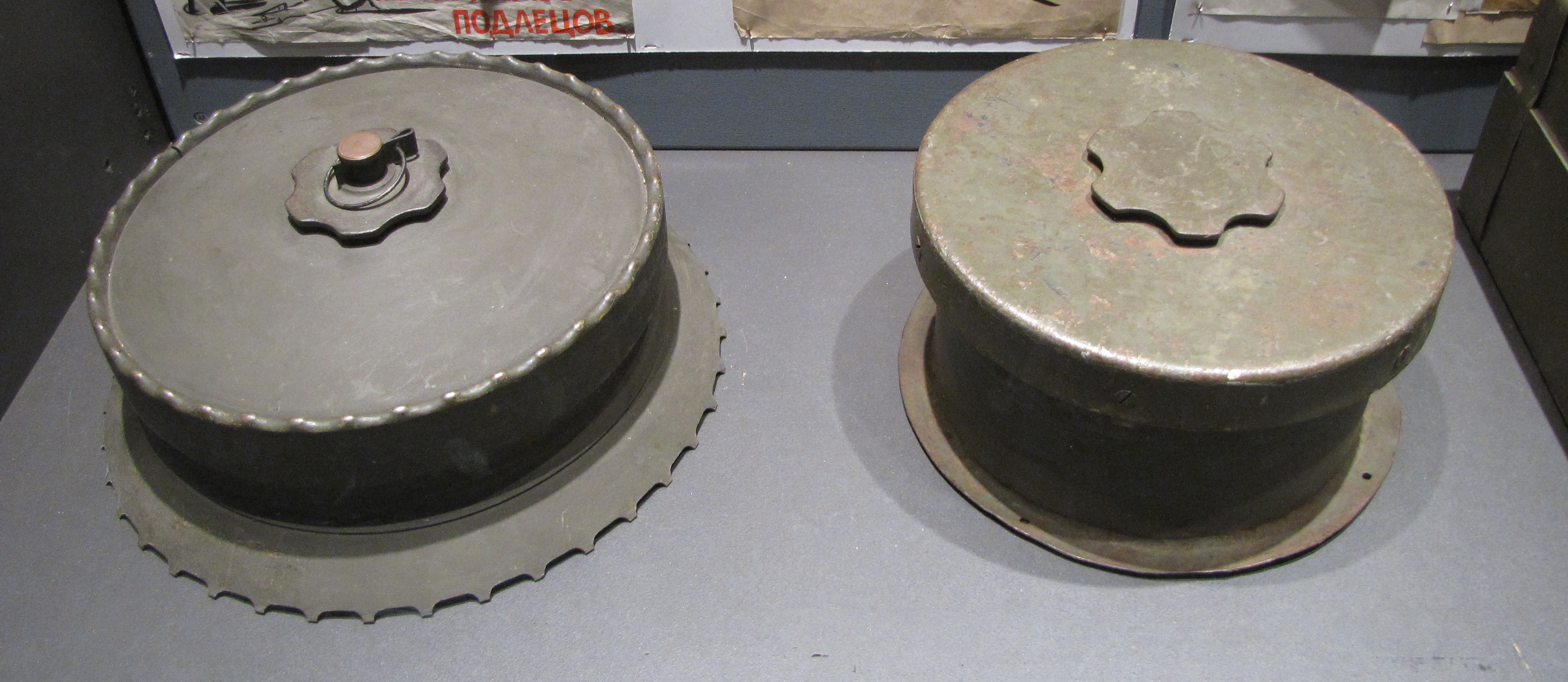
Panssarimiina m/36 shown on the left

The Panssarimiina m/36 is a Finnish anti-tank blast mine used during the Winter War, Second World War and Continuation War. The mine was the first purpose-built anti-tank mine to enter service with the Finnish Army, and was designed by Lieutenant Colonel T. Raatikainen and Lieutenant Colonel Pylkkänen. Only 5,000 were produced, as the mine proved complex to produce for a number of reasons. The fuze was complex and designed to be interchangeable with artillery fuzes, so artillery shells could be used alongside the mines, also the sheet metal case was hard to produce.

The mine is circular with a distinctive waisted shape. The top and the bottom of the mine have jagged edges, which enable the mine to grip to ice or frozen ground rather than slipping sideways.

During the Second World War the mine proved to have too little explosive content to reliably break the tracks of the latest Russian tanks, so two supplemental charges were issued, each weighing about 2.5 kg, they could be buried under the mine to supplement the main charge. Where these supplemental charges were not available a second mine was buried under the first.

The mine was replaced by the Panssarimiina m/39 in 1939, although it remained in service for some time afterwards.

== Specifications ==
- Height: 0.13 m
- Diameter: 26 cm to 31 cm
- Weight: 5.5 kg
- Explosive content: 2.8 kg of TNT or Amatol
- Activation pressure: 350 kg to 200 kg
