= TM-38 mine =

Anti-tank mine

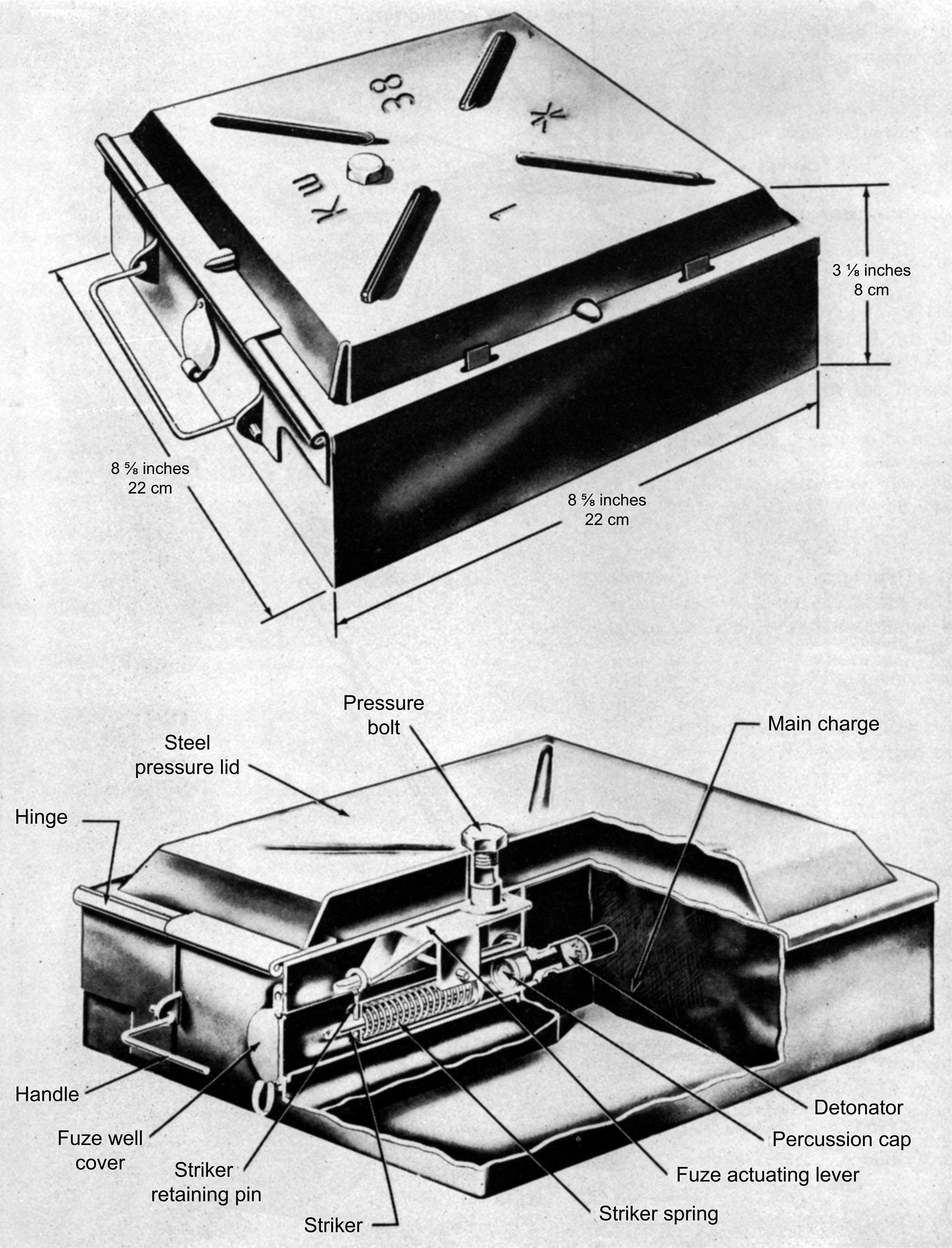
A TM-38 landmine, and cross section.

The TM-38 was a square, metal-cased Soviet anti-tank mine used during the Second World War. The mine had a large raised square central pressure plate with four reinforcing creases. When enough pressure was applied to the plate it collapses pressing down on a bolt connected to an internal lever. The lever pulls a retaining pin from the MUV fuze, which releases the striker, which impacts the MD-2 detonator.

The mine can be used with several anti-handling devices including an anti-lifting plate underneath the mine, and a device that connects the opening of the top of the mine to the fuze.

Although reasonably effective against wheeled vehicles and light tanks, it proved ineffective when used against heavier tanks later in the war. As a result, it was typically supplemented with larger charges underneath the mine. These would sometimes be rigged with additional MUV pull fuzes attached to the TM-38 mine, acting as a secondary anti-handling device.

== Specifications ==
- Length: 8.75 inches
- Width: 8.75 inches
- Height: 3.5 inches
- Weight: 11.4 lbs
- Explosive content: up to 6.5 lbs of TNT
- Activation pressure: 440 lbs
