= TMD-44 and TMD-B mines =

Anti-tank mines

The TMD-44 and TMD-B are simple rectangular Soviet wooden box cased anti-tank blast mines, they were both used during the Second World War. Both mines are similar in design, differing only in fuzing mechanism. The wooden construction of both the mines makes them unpredictable as rot and insects can eat away the wooden case, reducing activation pressure to as little as 3 kg. Both mines are found in a number of countries including Afghanistan, Angola, Chad, Cuba, Egypt, Korea, Mozambique, Namibia, Rwanda, Yemen, Zambia and Zimbabwe.

== TMD-B ==
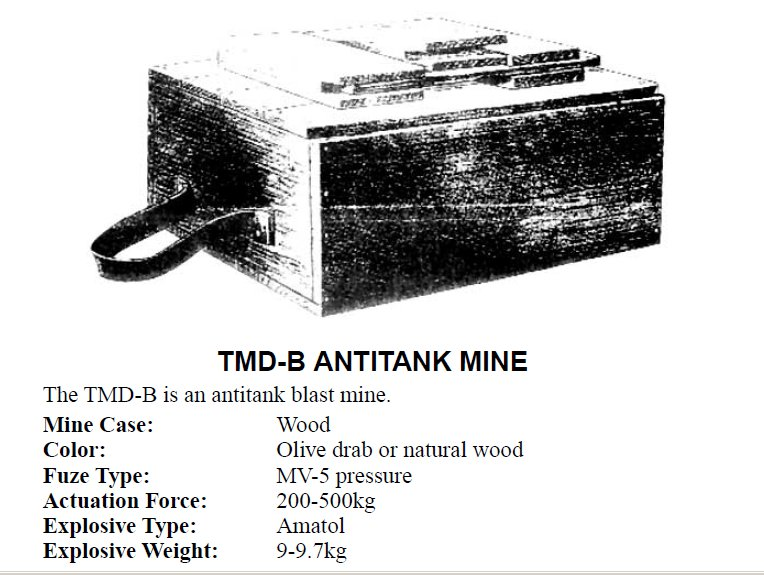
TMD-B info and image from a US Military manual.

The TMD-B was developed before the start of the Second World War and is simply a wooden box filled with explosives, there are three raised boards on the top of the box, the central one being hinged. The central hinged board is locked into place by a strip of wood inserted into a groove that runs along the edge of all three boards. When enough pressure is applied to the top of the mine the boards collapse onto the plunger of the MV-5 detonator, triggering the mine. A fabric carrying handle is typically fixed to one side of the mine. It was normally painted olive green, gray or white.

One problem with the mine was that when it got wet the hinged board would tend to swell making it difficult to disarm the mine, this issue was addressed in the TMD-44 mine.

The mine has been copied by a number of other countries, including the Chinese Model 1951, the North Korean ATM-74, and the Yugoslavian TDM-1 and TMD-2.

== TMD-44 ==
The TMD-44 entered service with the Red Army in 1944, and essentially was simply the TMD-B mine with the central hinged board replaced with a Bakelite fuze cap, this solved the disarming issue with the earlier TMD-B.

Copies of the TMD-44 are produced in North Korea as the ATM-44, and the Yugoslavian TMD-B and TMD-1 are extremely similar.

== Specifications ==
- Weight: 9 to 10 kg
- Explosive content: 5 to 7 kg of TNT or Picric Acid
- Operating pressure: 200 to 500 kg
- Length: 320 mm
- Width: 290 mm
- Height: 160 mm
