= TM-41 mine =

Soviet anti-tank mine

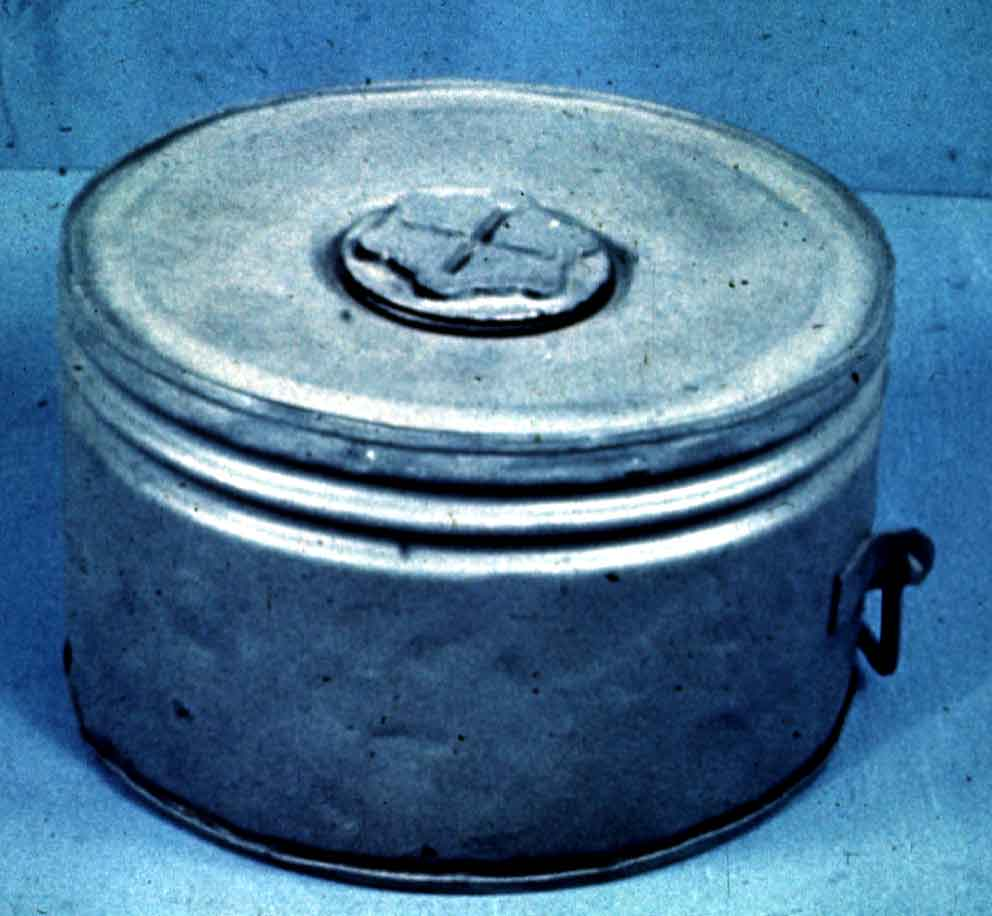
The TM-41 landmine with a carrying handle on the side

The TM-41 was a circular, metal-cased Soviet anti-tank landmine used during the Second World War. The mines case consisted of a short cylinder with the entire top surface being used as a pressure plate. The mine has a carrying handle on the side of the mine. It was normally painted olive drab and was broadly similar to the larger, later, TM-44 mine.

The mine could be waterproofed with washers and laid underwater, where it can remain operational for two months.

Pressure on the pressure plate resulted in lock balls being force out of position, releasing a striker, which triggers a detonator, then a booster and then the mines main charge.

The mine was used with anti-handling devices.

A Chinese copy of the mine was also produced.

== Specifications ==
- Diameter: 254 mm
- Height: 140 mm
- Weight: 5.4 kg
- Explosive content: 3.9 kg of Amatol or TNT
- Activation pressure: 160 kg
