= 107 mm divisional gun M1940 (M-60) =

Cannon

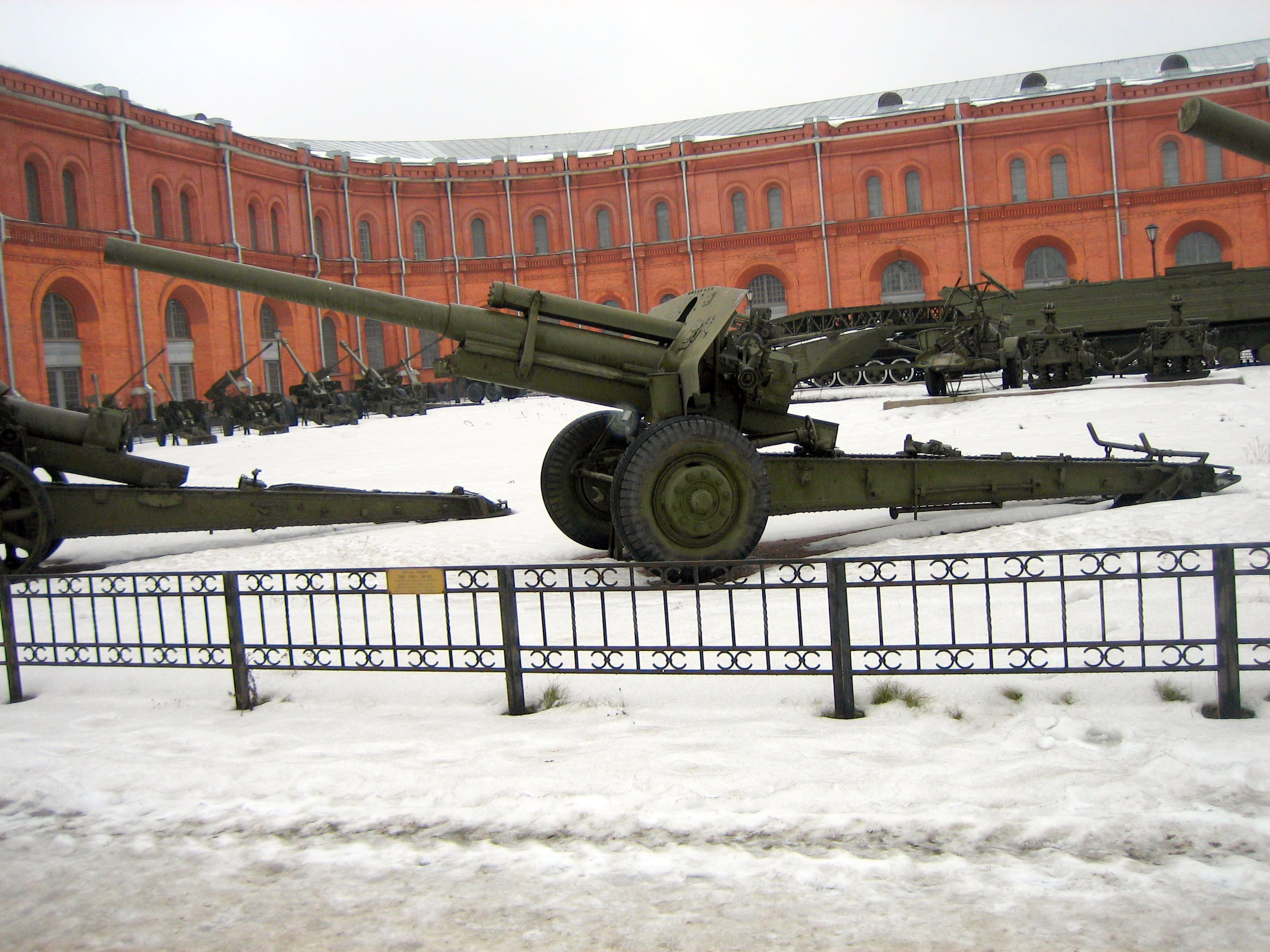
- M-60 at the Artillery Museum, Saint Petersburg
- Type: field gun
- Place of origin: USSR

Service history
- Used by: USSR
- Wars: WWII

Production history
- Designer: No. 172 Plant, F. F. Petrov
- Designed: 1938–1940
- Manufacturer: No. 172 Plant, No. 352 Plant
- Produced: 1940-1941
- No. built: 139

Specifications
- Mass: Combat: 4,000 kg (8,818 lbs); Travel: 4,300 kg (9,480 lbs)
- Length: 8.09 m (26 ft 7 in)
- Barrel length: Bore: 4.47 m (14 ft 8 in) L/41.8; Overall: 4.6 m (15 ft 1 in) L/43
- Width: 2.20 m (7 ft 3 in)
- Height: 1.92 m (6 ft 4 in)
- Crew: 8
- Shell: 106.7 x 420mmR; Separate loading charge and projectile
- Caliber: 106.7 mm (4.21 in)
- Breech: interrupted screw
- Carriage: Split trail
- Elevation: −4.5° to 45°
- Traverse: 60°
- Rate of fire: 6–7 rounds per minute

The 107 mm divisional gun M1940 (M-60) (Russian: 107-мм дивизионная пушка образца 1940 года (М-60)) was a Soviet artillery piece, developed in the late 1930s in order to provide Soviet divisional artillery with a powerful field and anti-tank gun. The weapon entered production in 1940, but soon after the outbreak of the German-Soviet War, production ceased; only a limited number of pieces were built. These guns saw service in the Red Army during the war.

== Development ==
=== Background ===
Until the late 1930s, Soviet divisional artillery consisted of 76.2 mm guns, designed to use the same model 1900 cartridge case, complemented by 122 mm howitzers. The reason for continued reliance on the 76.2 mm caliber was that the USSR had a large supply of 76.2 mm ammunition, some delivered during World War I and also possessed suitable manufacturing equipment. Various improvements in metallurgy, chemistry and ordnance design allowed the production of guns such as the USV and the ZiS-3, which were superior to the older ones in many respects, being lighter and featuring modern split trail carriages. However, all these improvements could not remedy the inherent weakness of the existing high-explosive shell. The 76.2 mm caliber was chosen by the Russian Imperial Army prior to the trench warfare era for its sufficient shrapnel performance; but high-explosive shells of the caliber contained a relatively small amount of explosives (typically some 600–700 grams) that were only moderately effective against field fortifications.

=== Work on 95 mm guns ===
The decision to initiate development of larger caliber divisional guns was made in the second half of 1937. Late that year the 95 mm was proposed. On 10 March 1938 the Main Directorate of Artillery (GAU) initiated work on a 95 mm divisional gun at the Kirov Plant and the No. 92 Plant. The former quickly abandoned the development, but the UZTM Uralmash production facility swiftly joined the program. Both guns were supposed to have a companion piece in the form of the 122 mm howitzer.

The UZTM project, U-4, used the same carriage as the 122 mm howitzer U-2; but the development was never completed. At the No. 92 Plant, the team headed by V. G. Grabin developed a gun designated the F-28, based on the carriage of the F-25 122 mm howitzer. The first prototype was ready in December 1938, even before the project was officially approved by the GAU on 23 March 1939. The F-28 reached ground trials on 12 February 1940. However, in the spring of 1940 all work on the 95 mm pieces was canceled due to a decision to adopt even larger calibers for divisional artillery.

=== Work on 107 mm guns ===
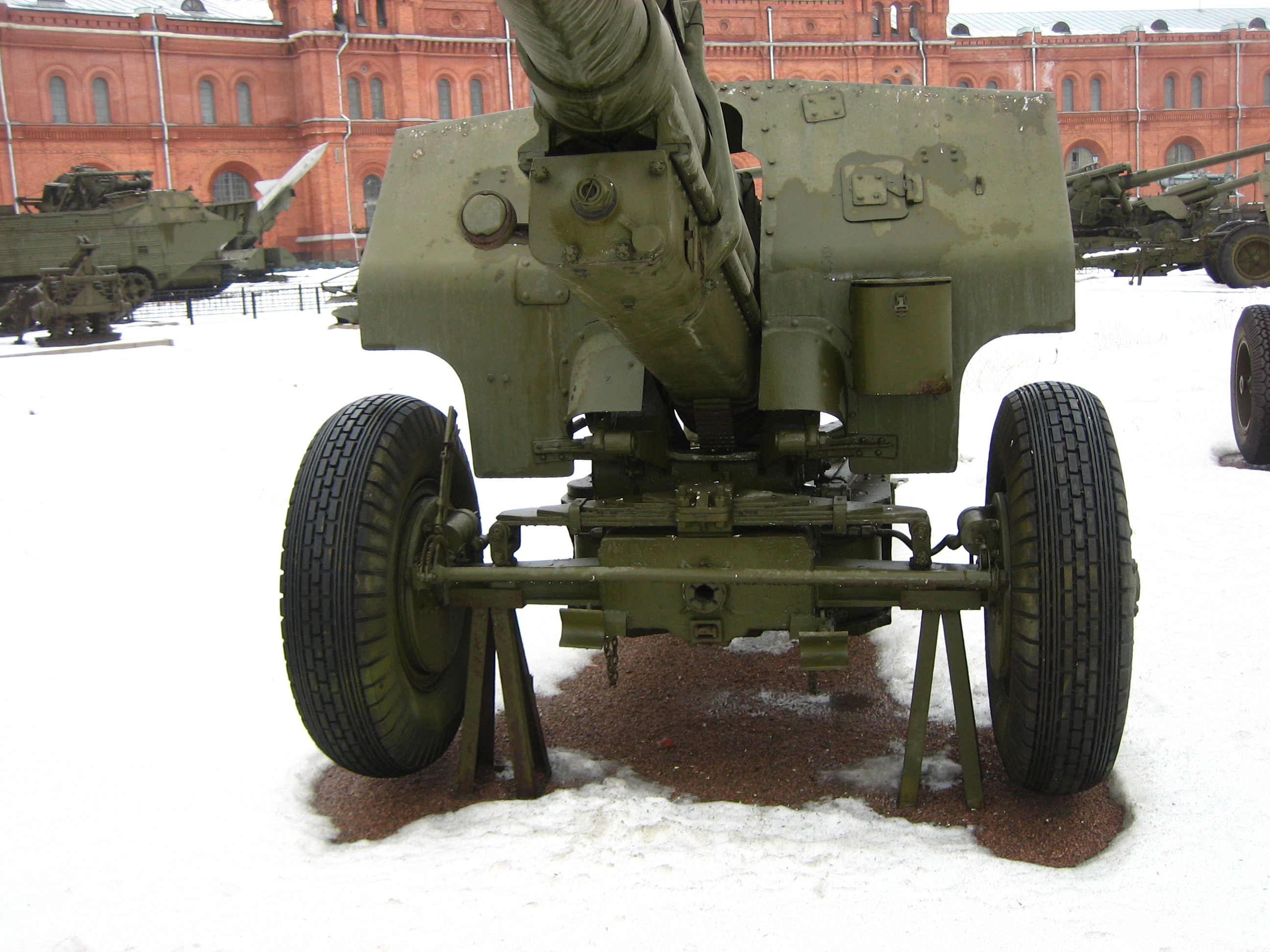
Front view

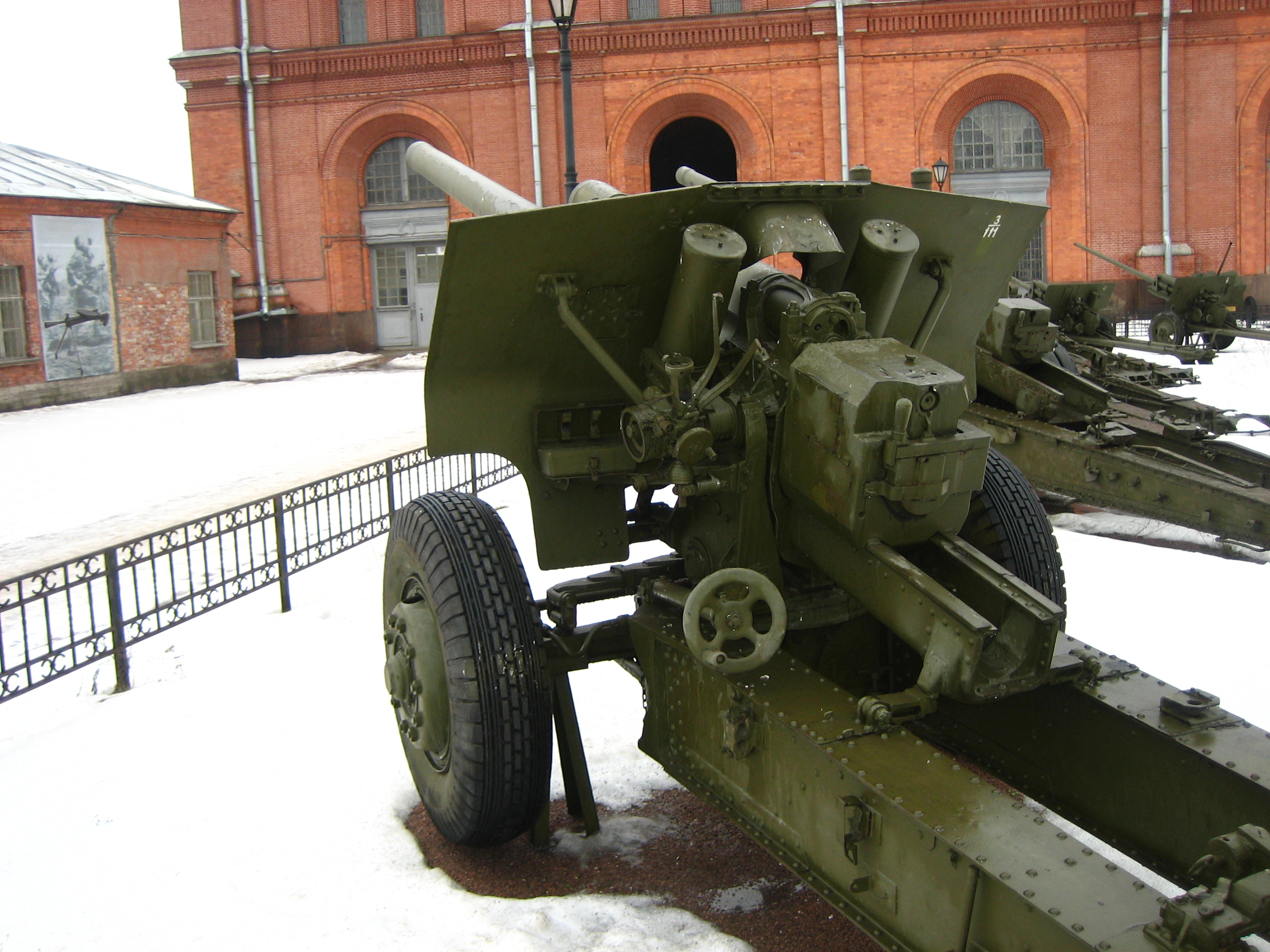
Rear view

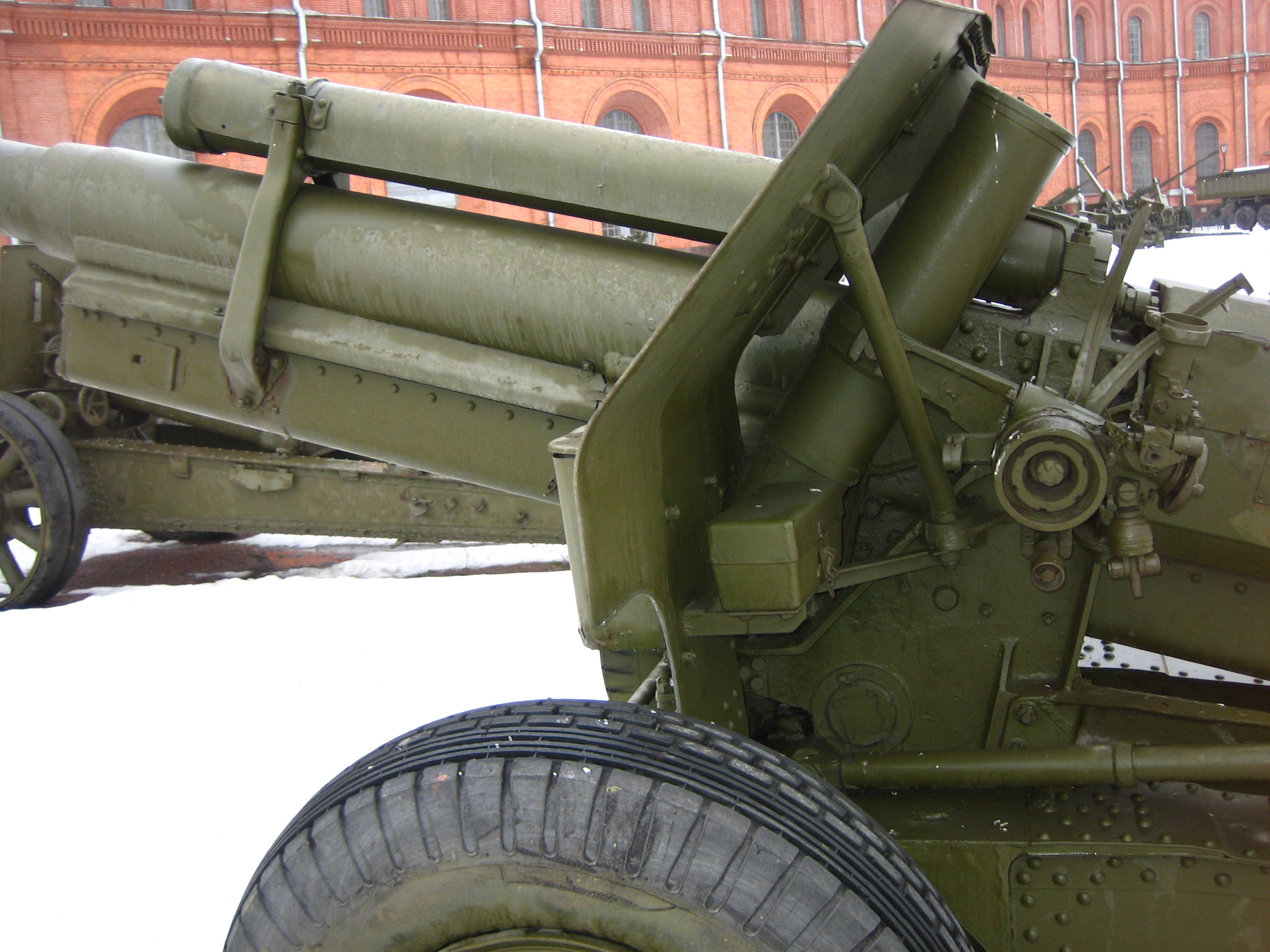
Left side view

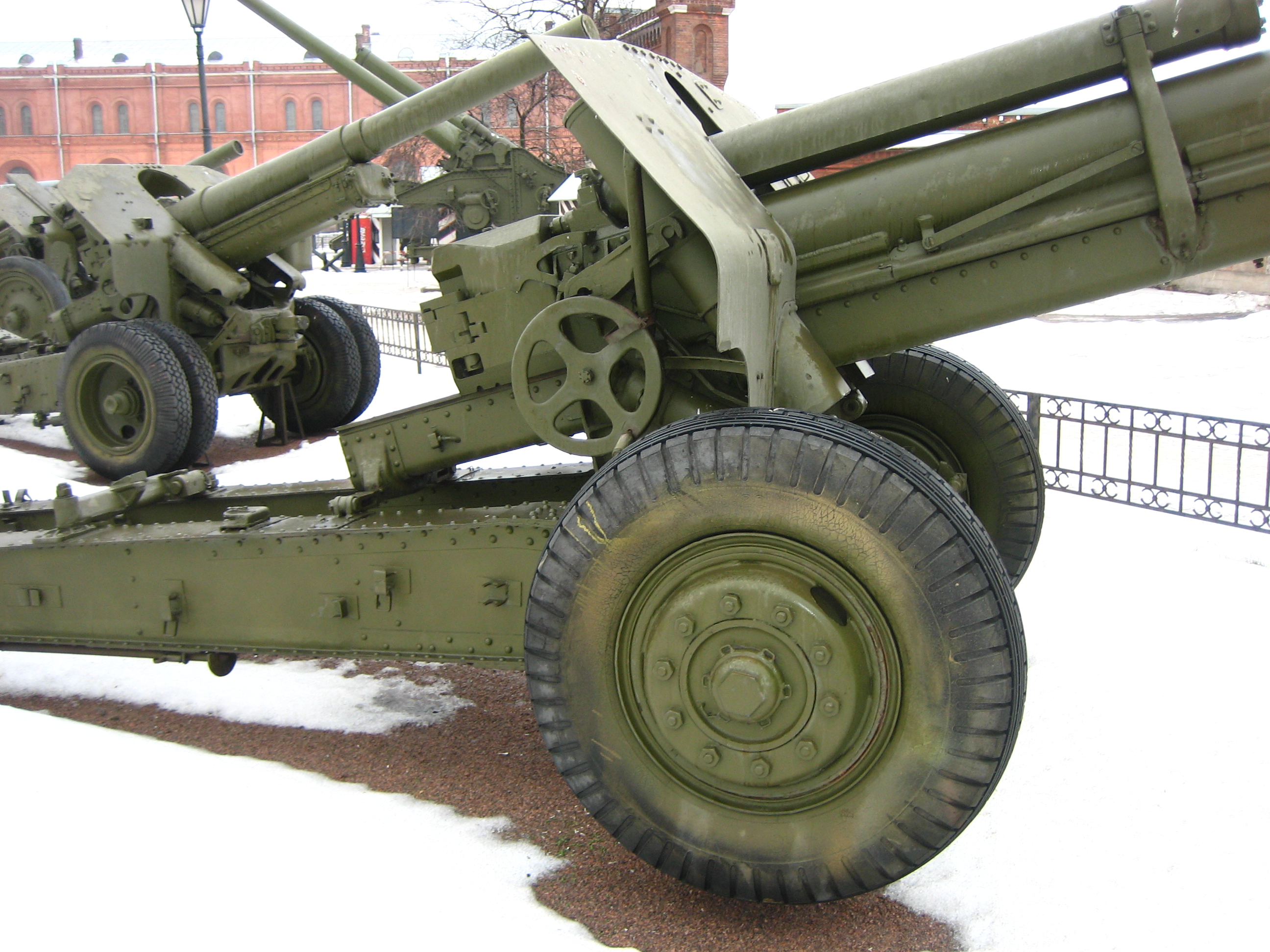
Right side view

The GAU decided to start working on a 107 mm divisional gun in the autumn of 1938. The reason typically cited for this decision was the reluctance to introduce a new caliber, such as 95 mm. The 107 mm was used by both the Russian Imperial Army and the Red Army; Soviet industry manufactured both guns and ammunition, so the transition from 76 mm guns would be simpler and cheaper. One problem of using such a large caliber was the significant increase in weight. However, it was deemed possible to develop a powerful 107 mm gun in the same weight category as the 4-ton 152 mm howitzer M1938 (M-10), which, when adopted in 1939, was considered sufficiently mobile for a divisional piece.

In 1940 the GAU already had another incentive in the form of intelligence reports (which were incorrect) about the Wehrmacht adopting new tanks with thicker armor. The head of the GAU, Grigory Kulik, questioned the ability of the existing 45 mm anti-tank and 76 mm divisional artillery to fight these new vehicles. This concern eventually led to the adoption of much more powerful 57 mm anti-tank and 107 mm divisional pieces by the Red Army. These new guns were not designed to fully replace the 45 mm and 76 mm weapons, but to complement them.

On 14 October 1938, the No. 172 Plant received a technical requirement for a 107 mm piece. The gun was developed in three variants, designated M-25, M-45 and M-60. The first two utilized the carriage of the M-10 howitzer; the prototypes successfully passed trials, but the new M-60 was preferred. Initially, the M-60 was also being developed in two variants, which differed in the arrangement for transportation – in one variant, the barrel was pulled back, while in the other the upper carriage was rotated 180 degrees. Of these, the former was selected. On 13 December 1939 the prototypes reached ground trials, which continued until 23 April 1940. After some improvements, the gun successfully passed army trials between 11 and 25 October 1940 and was adopted as the '107 mm universal high power divisional gun M1940'.

After the cancellation of the F-28 project, the design bureau of the No. 92 Plant also worked on a 107 mm gun. Late in 1940 the plant produced a ZiS-24 prototype, featuring a very long 73.5 caliber barrel placed on the carriage of a 152 mm howitzer-gun M1937 (ML-20). While very powerful, the gun was also very heavy and expensive, and the project was abandoned. Later the same design bureau worked on another 107 mm gun, which combined the carriage of a M-60 and a barrel with identical ballistics to the ZiS-6 anti-tank gun. After the outbreak of the German-Soviet War the project was canceled.

There was also an attempt to develop a casemate gun based on the M-60. The technical requirements were approved on 27 July 1940. The design bureau of the No. 352 Plant worked on the project from 22 September. This project, too, was canceled due to the outbreak of the war.

== Production ==
The gun entered production at the No. 352 Plant in Novocherkassk and at the No. 172 Plant. The former contributed 25 pieces in 1940 and a further 101 in 1941.

Soon after the outbreak of the German-Soviet War, production ceased for the following reasons:

- A shortage of artillery tractors with sufficient power meant divisional artillery would have difficulty in transporting the heavy gun;
- Corps level artillery was disbanded with the disbanding of rifle corps;
- No immediate need for a heavy gun with good anti-tank performance was perceived;
- The gun was complicated to produce and demanding to maintain;
- In the extreme circumstances of 1941, the Soviet Union did not have any spare industrial capacity for the M-60.

== Description ==
The barrel consisted of a loose liner and jacket which was screwed into the breech; the breechblock was of the interrupted screw type, borrowed from the 122 mm howitzer M1910/30. The variable length recoil system consisted of a hydraulic recoil buffer and hydro-pneumatic recuperator. The gun was fitted with segment-type elevation gear and screw-type traverse gear. The carriage was of the split trail type, with trolleybus-type wheels and rubber tires. To protect the crew from small arms fire and shell fragments, a shield was fitted.

In the traveling position, the barrel was pulled back. Short-distance movement with the barrel in the original position was permitted, as long as the speed did not exceed 6–7 km/h.

== Organization and service ==
Despite being developed as a divisional gun, the M-60 was never used by Red Army rifle divisions. In 1941, M-60s served in anti-tank artillery brigades; according to the official organization, these consisted of two regiments, each with a battalion of M-60s, (12 pieces) and two battalions of 85 mm anti-aircraft guns, with both types of weapons employed as heavy anti-tank guns. In practice, most of the brigades never received their 107 mm guns. These brigades were disbanded in late 1941 and the surviving M-60s were used in independent 12-gun battalions.

In 1943 rifle corps were reintroduced. Corps artillery regiments received most of the surviving 107 mm guns, along with 122 mm guns and 152 mm howitzers; in total, each regiment had 16-20 pieces.

Since the M-60 was a limited production weapon, reports about its actual use in combat are rare. Some saw action at the Battle of Kursk, with Central Front forces. Six M-60s were used during the liberation of Sevastopol in 1944.

A few pieces were captured by the Wehrmacht; they were designated 10.7 cm K 353(r) by the Germans.

A surviving piece can be seen in the Artillery Museum in Saint Petersburg.

== Summary ==
The German attack in 1941 led to a situation in which the Soviet Union had neither the requirement for a weapon like the M-60 nor the industrial capacity for its production. As a result, only a limited number of pieces were supplied to the Red Army.

The M-60 was the last 107 mm piece adopted by the Red Army. Although in 1943 another 107 mm gun, the 9S-1, was developed, it never reached production. Until the end of the war, the divisional artillery continued to rely on 76 mm guns (in conjunction with 122 mm howitzers), while larger formations employed heavier, more powerful weapons such as the 122 mm A-19. When a need for a very powerful anti-tank gun was identified later in the war, the 100 mm BS-3 was developed. Unlike the M-60, the BS-3 used fixed ammunition, resulting in a better rate of fire; the BS-3 was also lighter (3.6 tons) and had a shorter deployment time because its barrel was not pulled back for transportation. However, the use of fixed rounds - and a limited assortment of 100 mm ammunition - made it less useful as a field gun. In 1945 another weapon intended for a similar role was adopted, in the form of the 85 mm divisional gun D-44.

For the sake of comparison, the standard German 105 mm gun, the 10.5 cm sK 18, had similar characteristics. It somewhat surpassed the M-60 in range (19 km, or 21 km for a modernized K 18/40), but was much heavier at about six tons. The German gun also fired a somewhat lighter (15 kg) shell.

Another comparable weapon was the British BL 4.5-inch Medium Field Gun. Although much heavier than the M-60, it fired a 25 kg projectile to nearly 19 km.

== Ammunition ==
The M-60 fired separately loaded ammunition, with the propellant charge in the cartridge. Projectiles used by the older M1910/30 could be utilized, but with a different cartridge case and propellant charge. Three different charges – full, first and second – were used.

The explosion of the OF-420 shell, with the fuse set to the fragmentation action, resulted in damage to 90% of targets in the 6 to 14 meters area and to 50% of targets in a 20 to 42 meter area. When the fuse was set to high-explosive action, the shell created a hole 1–1.5 m in diameter and 40–60 cm deep in average soil.

The shrapnel shell contained more than 600 bullets, and covered an area about 800 m long and 45–50 m wide.

Ammunition available
Type	Model	Weight, kg	HE weight, kg	Muzzle velocity, m/s	Range, m
Armor-piercing
APBC	B-420	18.71	0.44	730	3,000
High-explosive and fragmentation projectiles
HE-frag, long range, steel	OF-420	17.2	2.15	737	18,300
HE-frag	OF-420U	17.4	2.01	670	16,130
HE	F-420U	16.54	1.8
HE, old	F-422L	16.41	1.56
HE, old	F-422K	16.41	1.54
HE, old	F-422M	16.41	1.7
Shrapnel projectiles
Shrapnel with 45 sec tube	Sh-422	16.54-17.25	0.44
Shrapnel with T-6 tube	Sh-422T	16.44	0.44
Smoke projectiles
Smoke	D-422U	16.73	0.32/1.76
Incendiary projectiles
Incendiary, with T-6 / T-7 tube	Z-420	17.2	0.035/1.6	737	11,400
Incendiary, with T-6 / T-7 tube	Z-420	16,37	0,035/1,6
Chemical projectiles
Frag-chemical	OH-420	17.2
Chemical	HS-420	16.9
Chemical with "NOV"	HN-422	16.4
Chemical with "SOV"	HS-422	16.4	0.35/1.7

Armor penetration table
APBC projectile B-420
Distance, m	Meet angle 60°, mm	Meet angle 90°, mm
100	111	137
300	108	133
500	106	130
1,000	99	121
1,500	92	113
2,000	86	106
3,000	75	92
This data was obtained by Soviet methodics of armour penetration measurement (penetration probability 75%). It is not directly comparable with western data of similar type.
