= Markocin, West Pomeranian Voivodeship =

Markocin
- Village
- Location within Poland
- Coordinates: 52°55′21″N 14°10′45″E
- Country: Poland
- Voivodeship: West Pomeranian
- County: Gryfino
- Gmina: Cedynia
- Population: 10

Markocin [marˈkɔt͡ɕin] (German: Vorwerk Markentun) is a village in the administrative district of Gmina Cedynia, within Gryfino County, West Pomeranian Voivodeship, in north-western Poland, close to the German border. It lies approximately 5 km (3 mi) north of Cedynia, 42 km (26 mi) south-west of Gryfino, and 62 km (39 mi) south-west of the regional capital Szczecin.

The village has a population of 10.
