= Stary Kostrzynek =

- Village
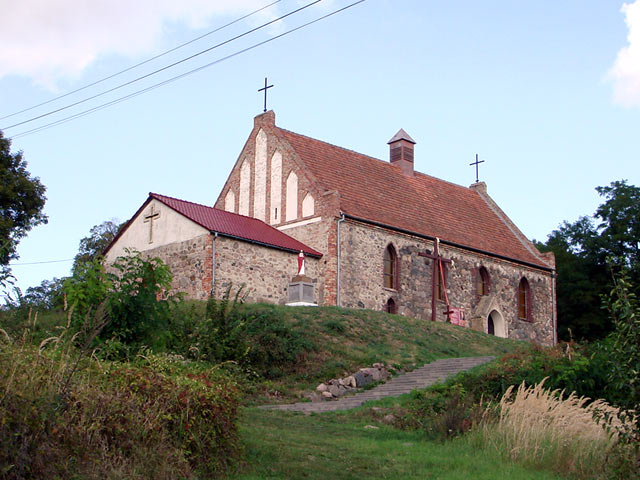
- Village church

- Location within Poland
- Coordinates: 52°49′N 14°10′E
- Country: Poland
- Voivodeship: West Pomeranian
- County: Gryfino
- Gmina: Cedynia

Stary Kostrzynek [ˈstarɨ kɔsˈtʂɨnɛk] (German: Altcüstrinchen) is a village in the administrative district of Gmina Cedynia, within Gryfino County, West Pomeranian Voivodeship, in north-western Poland, close to the German border. It lies approximately 8 km (5 mi) south of Cedynia, 53 km (33 mi) south-west of Gryfino, and 73 km (45 mi) south-west of the regional capital Szczecin. Stary Kostrzynek is the westernmost point in Poland.

Before 1945 the area was part of Brandenburg (Frankfurt Region) within Prussia, Germany. For more on the history of the region, see New March.
