= Radostów, West Pomeranian Voivodeship =

Radostów
- Village
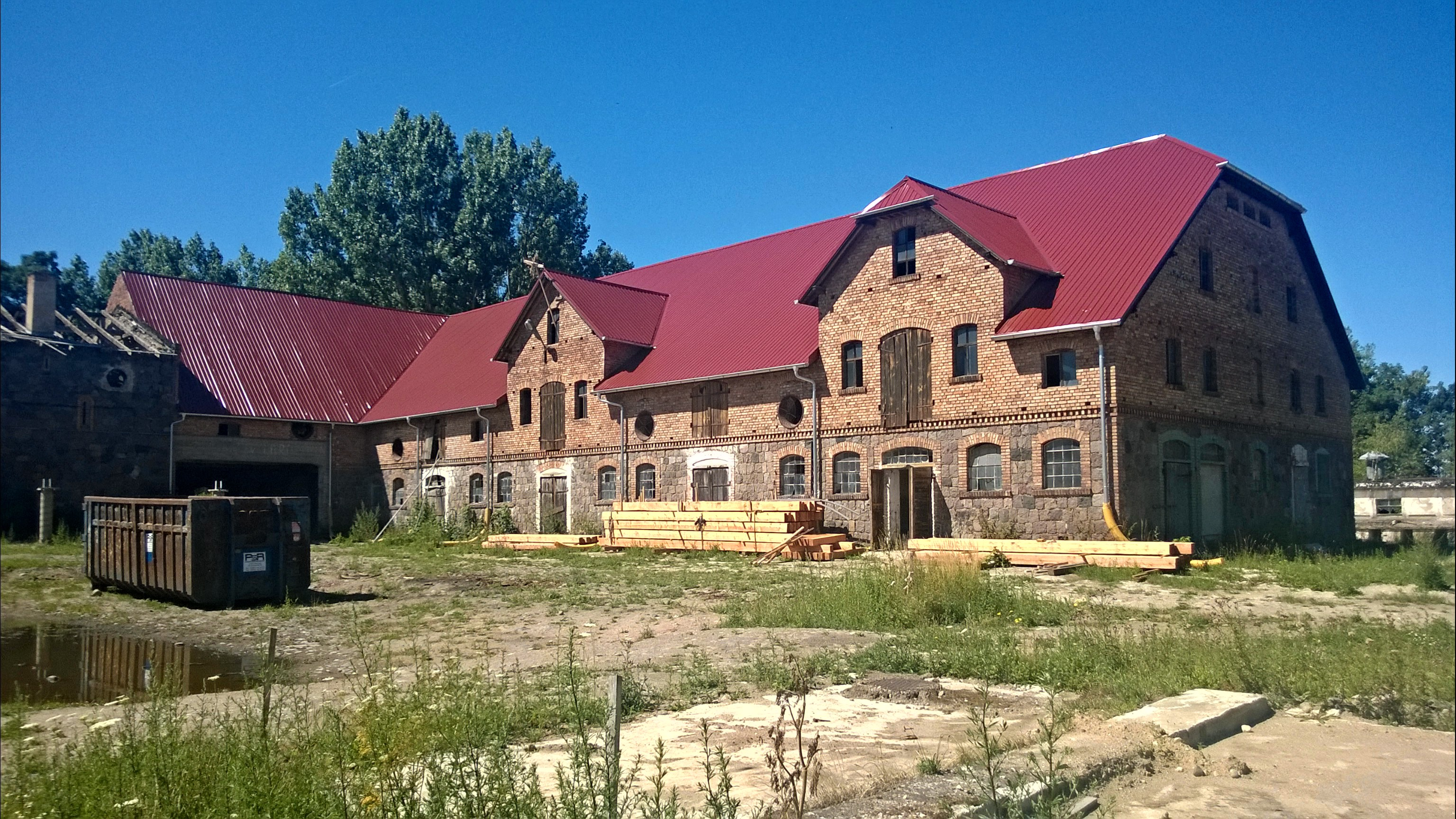
- Building in Radostów in 2015

- Location within Poland
- Coordinates: 52°51′59″N 14°13′52″E
- Country: Poland
- Voivodeship: West Pomeranian
- County: Gryfino
- Gmina: Cedynia

Radostów [raˈdɔstuf] (German: Karlstein) is a village in the administrative district of Gmina Cedynia, within Gryfino County, West Pomeranian Voivodeship, in north-western Poland, close to the German border. It lies approximately 3 km (2 mi) south-east of Cedynia, 46 km (29 mi) south of Gryfino, and 66 km (41 mi) south of the regional capital Szczecin.

For the history of the region, see History of Pomerania.
