= Siekierki, West Pomeranian Voivodeship =

Siekierki
- Village
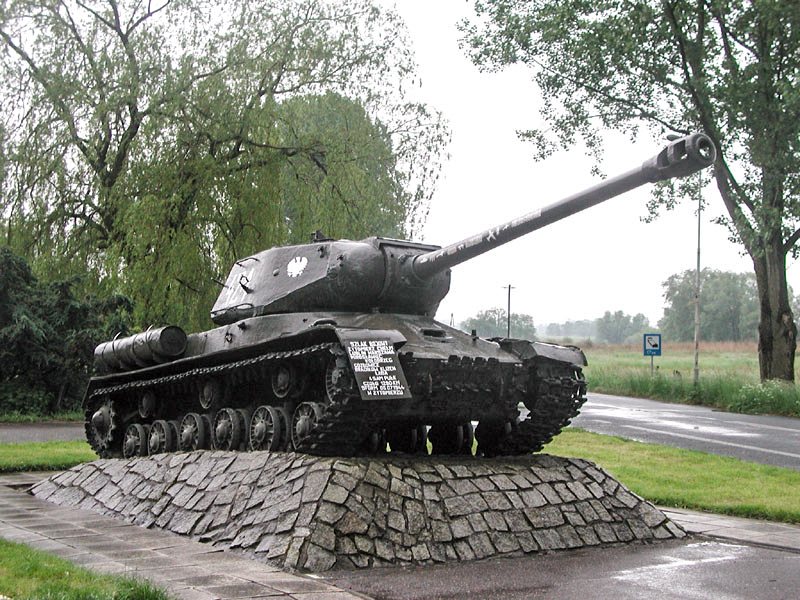
- IS-2 tank monument

- Location within Poland
- Coordinates: 52°48′27″N 14°14′42″E
- Country: Poland
- Voivodeship: West Pomeranian
- County: Gryfino
- Gmina: Cedynia
- Population: 173

Siekierki [ɕɛˈkʲɛrki] (German: Zäckerick) is a village in the administrative district of Gmina Cedynia, within Gryfino County West Pomeranian Voivodeship, in north-western Poland, close to the German border. It lies approximately 9 km (6 mi) south of Cedynia, 52 km (32 mi) south of Gryfino, and 72 km (45 mi) south of the regional capital Szczecin.

For the history of the region, see History of Pomerania.

The village has a population of 173.

== Notable residents ==
- Hans Schilling (aviator) (1892-1916), German World War I pilot
