= Stara Rudnica =

- Village
- Location within Poland
- Coordinates: 52°50′N 14°12′E
- Country: Poland
- Voivodeship: West Pomeranian
- County: Gryfino
- Gmina: Cedynia

Stara Rudnica [ˈstara rudˈnit͡sa] (German: Altrüdnitz) is a village in the administrative district of Gmina Cedynia, within Gryfino County, West Pomeranian Voivodeship, in north-western Poland, close to the German border. It lies approximately 6 km (4 mi) south of Cedynia, 50 km (31 mi) south of Gryfino, and 70 km (43 mi) south of the regional capital Szczecin.

For more on the history of the region, see New March.
