= Niesulow =

Niesulow may refer to the following places in Poland:

- Niesulów, Łódź Voivodeship (central Poland)
- Niesułów, West Pomeranian Voivodeship (north-west Poland)
