= Lubiechów Dolny =

- Village
- Location within Poland
- Coordinates: 52°54′55″N 14°12′22″E
- Country: Poland
- Voivodeship: West Pomeranian
- County: Gryfino
- Gmina: Cedynia

Lubiechów Dolny [luˈbjɛxuf ˈdɔlnɨ] (German: Nieder Lübbichow) is a village in the administrative district of Gmina Cedynia, within Gryfino County, West Pomeranian Voivodeship, in north-western Poland, close to the German border. It lies approximately 4 km (2 mi) north of Cedynia, 42 km (26 mi) south-west of Gryfino, and 62 km (39 mi) south-west of the regional capital Szczecin.

For the history of the region, see History of Pomerania.
