= Żelichów, West Pomeranian Voivodeship =

Żelichów
- Village
- Location within Poland
- Coordinates: 52°51′N 14°17′E
- Country: Poland
- Voivodeship: West Pomeranian
- County: Gryfino
- Gmina: Cedynia

Żelichów [ʐɛˈlixuf] is a village in the administrative district of Gmina Cedynia, within Gryfino County, West Pomeranian Voivodeship, in north-western Poland, close to the German border. It lies approximately 7 km (4 mi) south-east of Cedynia, 47 km (29 mi) south of Gryfino, and 66 km (41 mi) south of the regional capital Szczecin.
