= Piasek, West Pomeranian Voivodeship =

Piasek
- Village
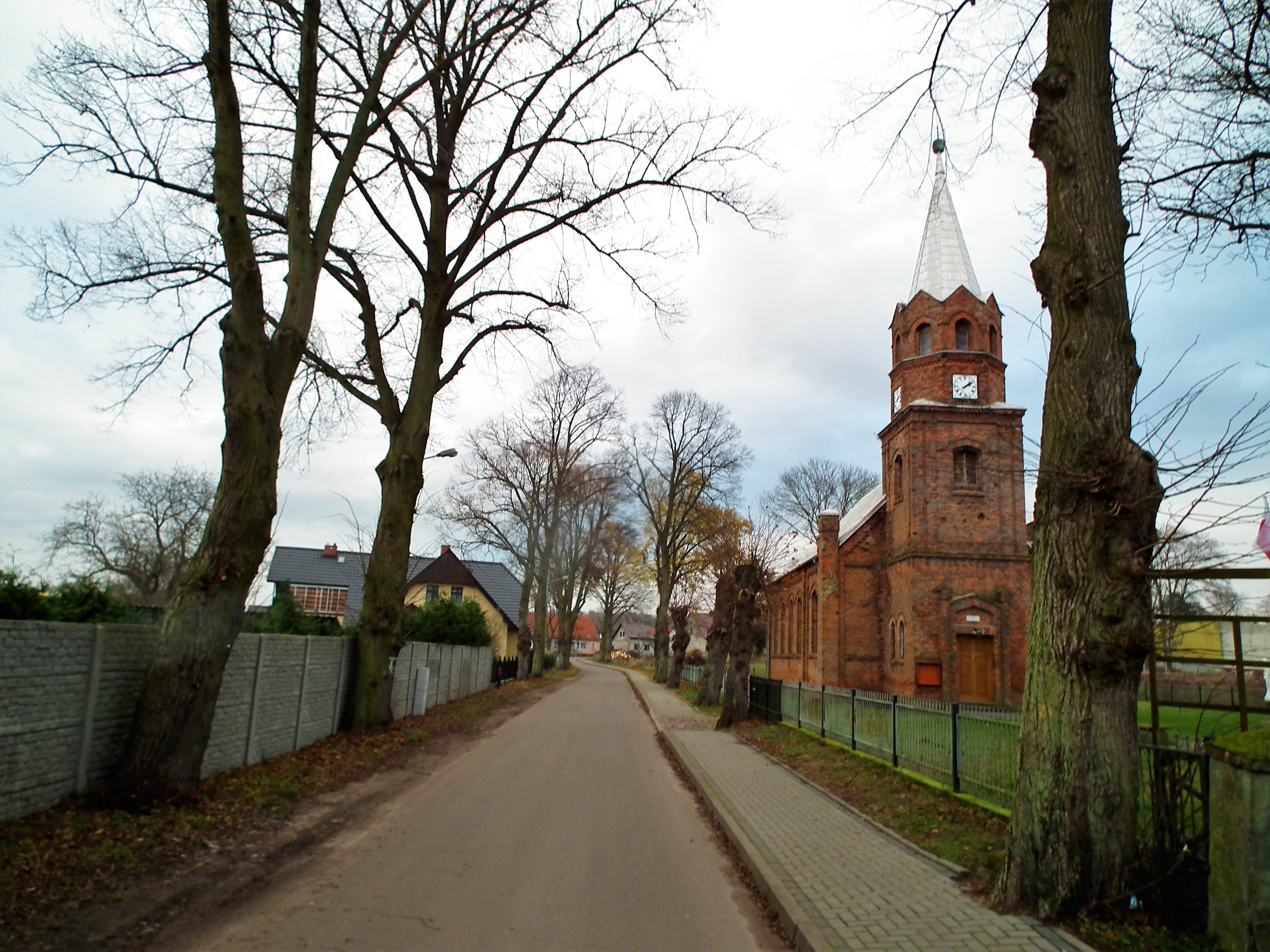
- Street into Piasek in 2017

- Location within Poland
- Coordinates: 52°58′36″N 14°12′26″E
- Country: Poland
- Voivodeship: West Pomeranian
- County: Gryfino
- Gmina: Cedynia

Piasek [ˈpjasɛk] (German: Peetzig) is a village in the administrative district of Gmina Cedynia, within Gryfino County, West Pomeranian Voivodeship, in north-western Poland, close to the German border. It lies approximately 11 km (7 mi) north of Cedynia, 36 km (22 mi) south-west of Gryfino, and 55 km (34 mi) south-west of the regional capital Szczecin.

For the history of the region, see History of Pomerania.
