= Barcie =

Barcie can mean:

- Barcie, Warmian-Masurian Voivodeship
- Barcie, West Pomeranian Voivodeship
