= Zachow =

Zachow may refer to:

== Places ==
- Czachów, West Pomeranian Voivodeship, (German: Zachow) is a village in north-western Poland
- Zachow, Wisconsin, is an unincorporated community located in Shawano County, Wisconsin, United States

== People ==
- Friedrich Wilhelm Zachow (1663–1712), German musician and composer
