= Bielinek =

- Village
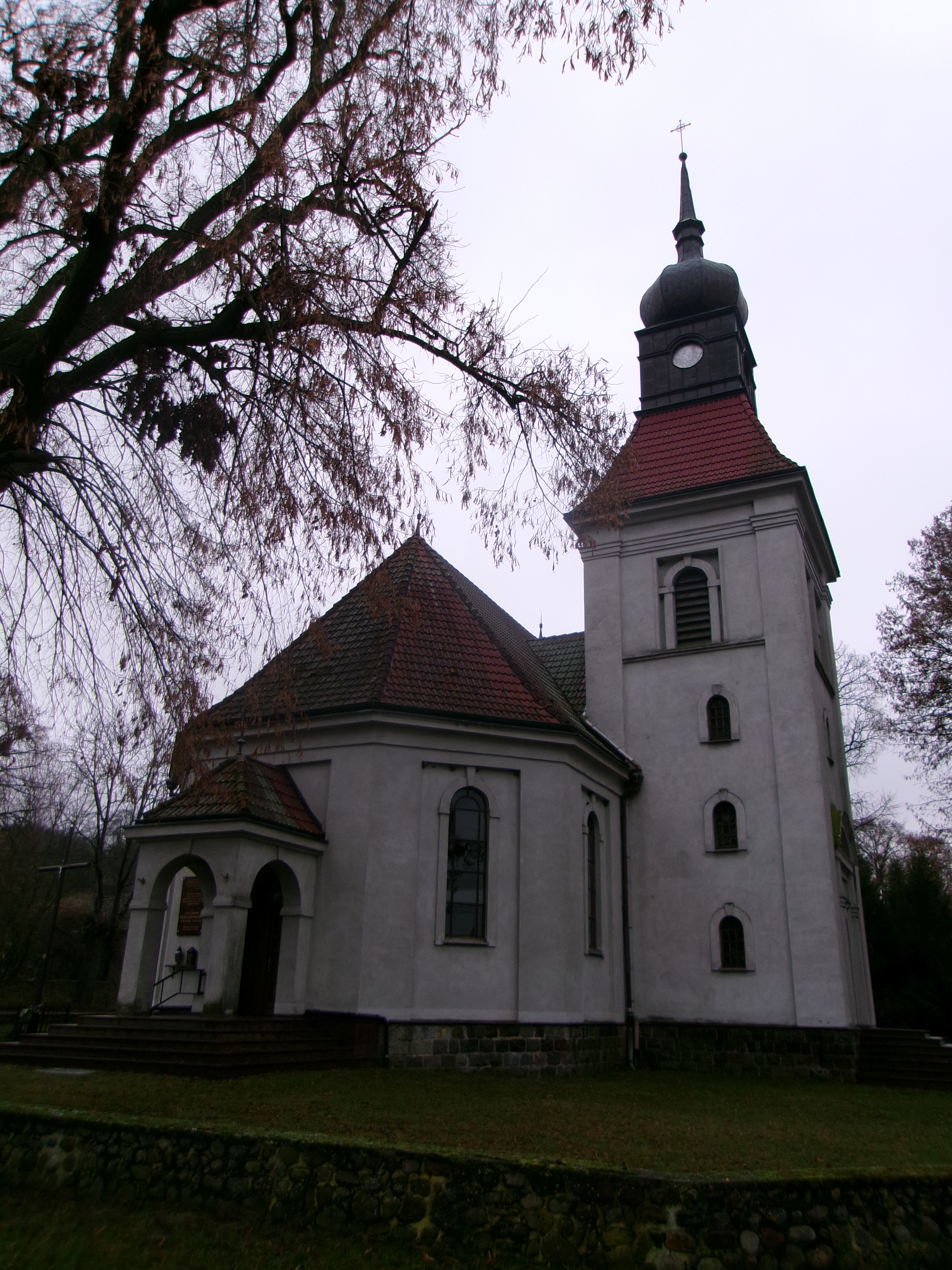
- Church of St. Barbara in Bielinek in 2025

- Location within Poland
- Coordinates: 52°56′33″N 14°9′17″E
- Country: Poland
- Voivodeship: West Pomeranian
- County: Gryfino
- Gmina: Cedynia
- Population: 210

Bielinek [bjɛˈlinɛk] (German: Bellinchen) is a village in the administrative district of Gmina Cedynia, within Gryfino County, West Pomeranian Voivodeship, in north-western Poland, close to the German border. It lies approximately 8 km (5 mi) north-west of Cedynia, 41 km (25 mi) south-west of Gryfino, and 60 km (37 mi) south-west of the regional capital Szczecin.

For the history of the region, see History of Pomerania.

The village has a population of 210.
