= Leslie Court =

Leslie Simpson Court
- Born: 1897; Romney Marsh, Kent, England
- Died: 10 December 1918 (aged 20–21); 1st Scottish General Hospital, Aberdeen
- Burial place: All Saints Church, Hollingbourne, Kent
- Military career
- Allegiance: United Kingdom
- Branch: British Army; Royal Air Force
- Rank: Second Lieutenant
- Service number: 10060
- Unit: No. 25 Squadron RFC
- Conflicts: World War I
- Awards: Médaille Militaire (France)

Second Lieutenant Leslie Simpson Court (1897 – 10 December 1918) was a British World War I flying ace. He was credited with eight aerial victories, gained while serving as an observer/gunner in No. 25 Squadron, Royal Flying Corps.

== Biography ==
=== Early life ===
Leslie Simpson Court was born in 1897 at Eyhorne Green Farm, Hollingbourne. His parents were George Robert and Sarah Ann Head Court.

=== Military service ===
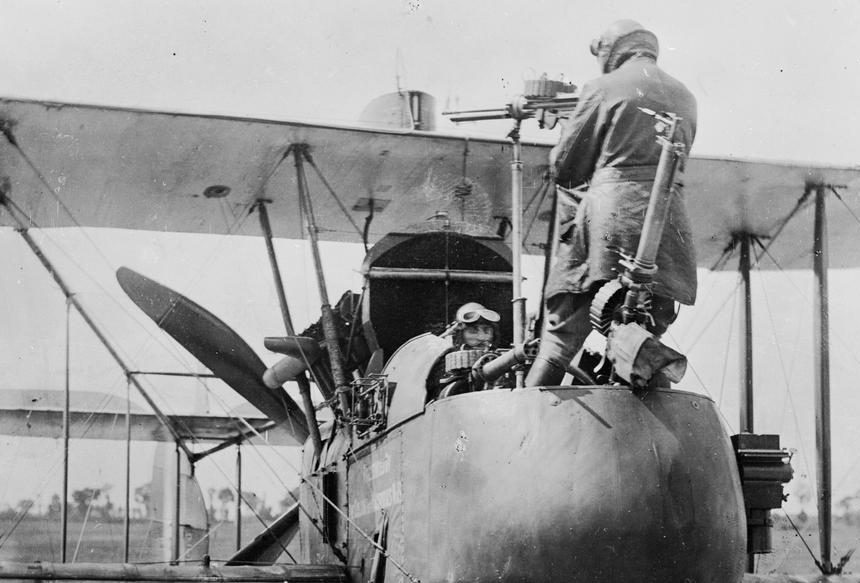
An F.E.2 observer shows how to use the rear-firing Lewis gun.

In 1916 Air Mechanic 2nd Class (2AM) Court was flying in 25 Squadron's FE.2B's. He began his victory string while piloted by Lancelot Richardson; on 26 June, the duo were credited with destruction of a German Fokker Eindekker. On 15 July, Court was credited with the destruction of a second Eindekker. Five days later, Court was again teamed with Richardson, and at 1830 hours, they destroyed an Eindekker and drove a second one down out of control, for two victories apiece. Richardson having been wounded during this sortie, Court was assigned to a newly arrived pilot, Corporal Thomas Mottershead for familiarization flights and initial combat missions. On 5 August, Court and Second Lieutenant W. H. Rilett, while crewing FE.2b Serial No. 6932, were shot down, crash landing just behind the British lines and then having the wrecked plane shelled by German artillery. Just over a month later, on 9 September, Court was teamed with Noel Webb, when they drove a German two-seater out of control, making Court an ace. He was subsequently promoted to Sergeant. On 27 September, Court flew with Second Lieutenant Victor William Harrison; in that day's dogfight, they shot down, and were shot down by, a German two-seater crew of Albert Dossenbach and Hans Schilling. All survived. Court went on to two final wins while flying as observer for fellow ace James Leith Leith; one the destruction of a German fighter plane on 22 October, the other a Fokker fighter driven down out of control on 9 November. On 1 May 1917 Court received permission to wear the Médaille Militaire, awarded to him by the French government.

On 25 October 1917 Court was commissioned as a probationary second lieutenant, being confirmed in his rank on 30 April 1918. He was serving at the 26th Training Depot Station, when he died at the 1st Scottish General Hospital, Aberdeen, on 10 December 1918. He is buried at All Saints Church, Hollingbourne, Kent, in the northwest angle of the church.

== Bibliography ==
- Guttman, Jon & Dempsey, Harry (2009). Pusher Aces of World War I. Osprey Publishing. ISBN 978-1-84603-417-6.
- Franks, Norman; Guest, Russell; Alegi, Gregory (1997). Above the War Fronts: the British Two-seater Bomber Pilot and Observer Aces, the British Two-seater Fighter Observer Aces, and the Belgian, Italian, Austro-Hungarian and Russian Fighter Aces, 1914-1918: Volume 4 of Fighting Airmen of WWI Series: Volume 4 of Air Aces of WWI. Grub Street. ISBN 1898697566, 978189869756.
