= Lubiechów Górny =

- Village
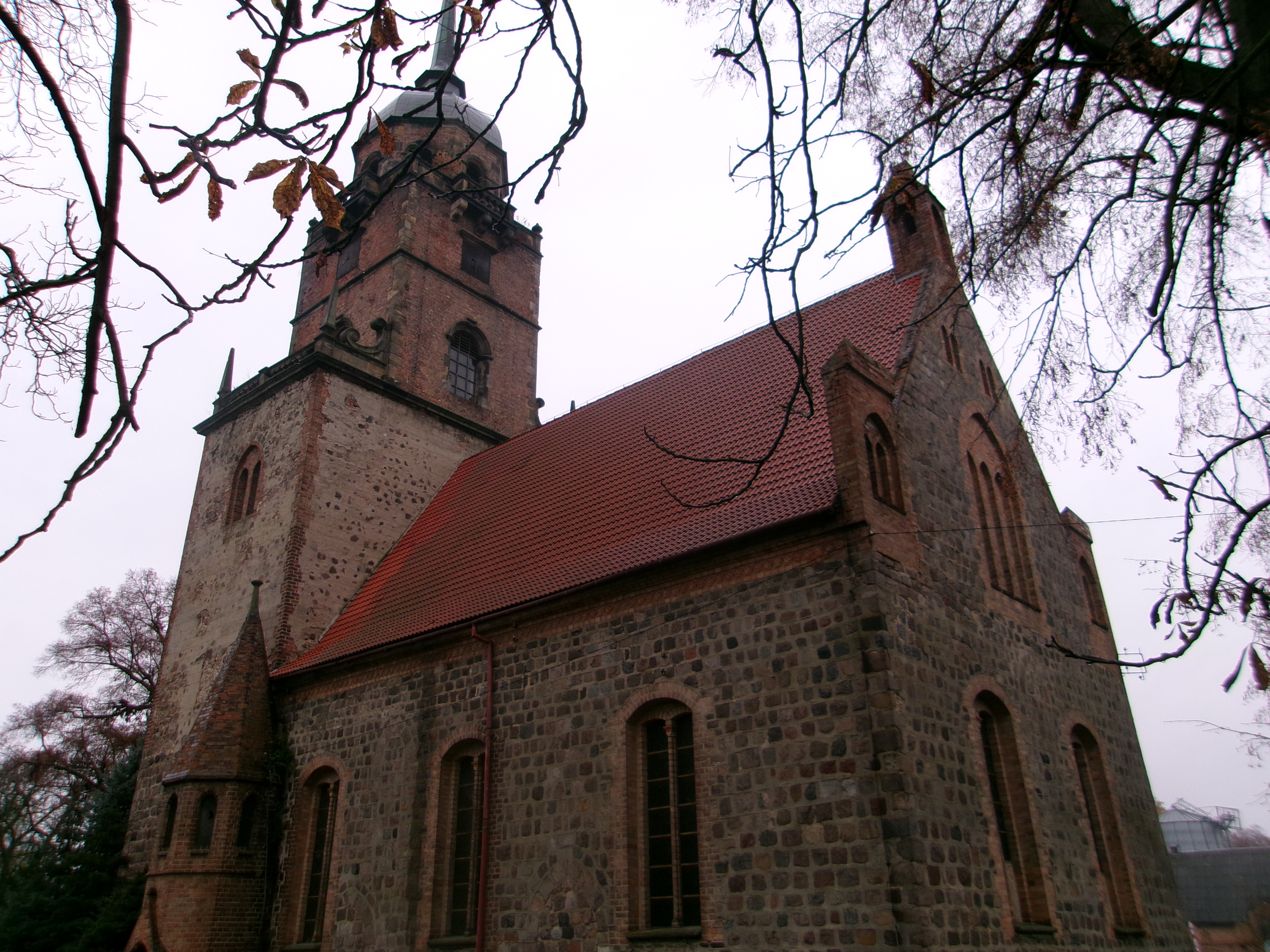
- Saint Joseph the Worker church in Lubiechów Górny in 2025

- Location within Poland
- Coordinates: 52°54′38″N 14°13′52″E
- Country: Poland
- Voivodeship: West Pomeranian
- County: Gryfino
- Gmina: Cedynia

Lubiechów Górny [luˈbjɛxuf ˈɡurnɨ] (German: Hohen Lübbichow) is a village in the administrative district of Gmina Cedynia, within Gryfino County, West Pomeranian Voivodeship, in north-western Poland, close to the German border. It lies approximately 4 km (2 mi) north-east of Cedynia, 42 km (26 mi) south-west of Gryfino, and 61 km (38 mi) south-west of the regional capital Szczecin.

For the history of the region, see History of Pomerania.
