= Orzechów, West Pomeranian Voivodeship =

Orzechów
- Village
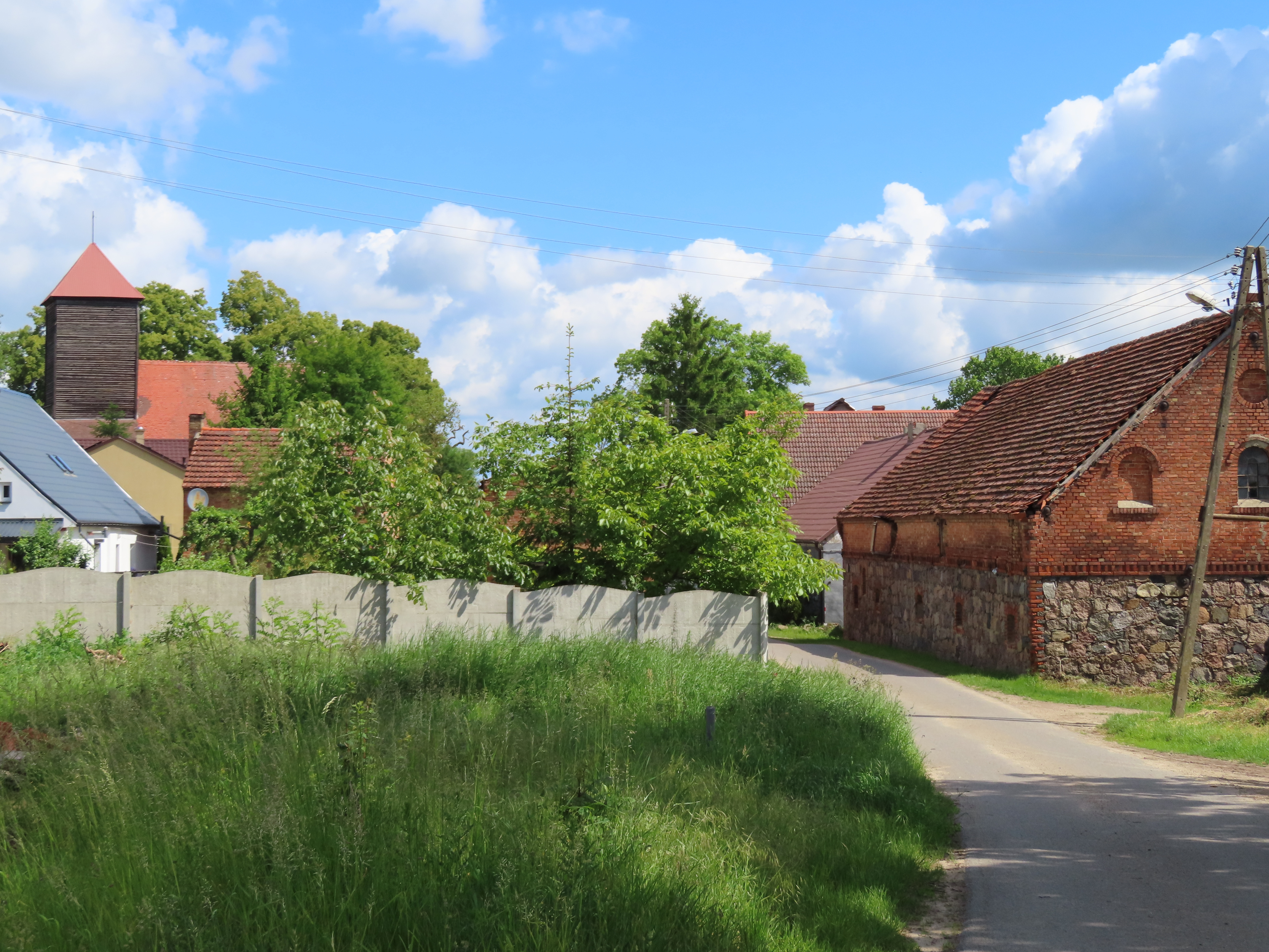

- Location within Poland
- Coordinates: 52°53′12″N 14°17′11″E
- Country: Poland
- Voivodeship: West Pomeranian
- County: Gryfino
- Gmina: Cedynia

Orzechów [ɔˈʐɛxuf] (German: Wrechow) is a village in the administrative district of Gmina Cedynia, within Gryfino County, West Pomeranian Voivodeship, in north-western Poland, close to the German border. It lies approximately 6 km (4 mi) east of Cedynia, 43 km (27 mi) south of Gryfino, and 63 km (39 mi) south of the regional capital Szczecin.

For the history of the region, see History of Pomerania.
