= Łukowice, West Pomeranian Voivodeship =

Łukowice
- Village
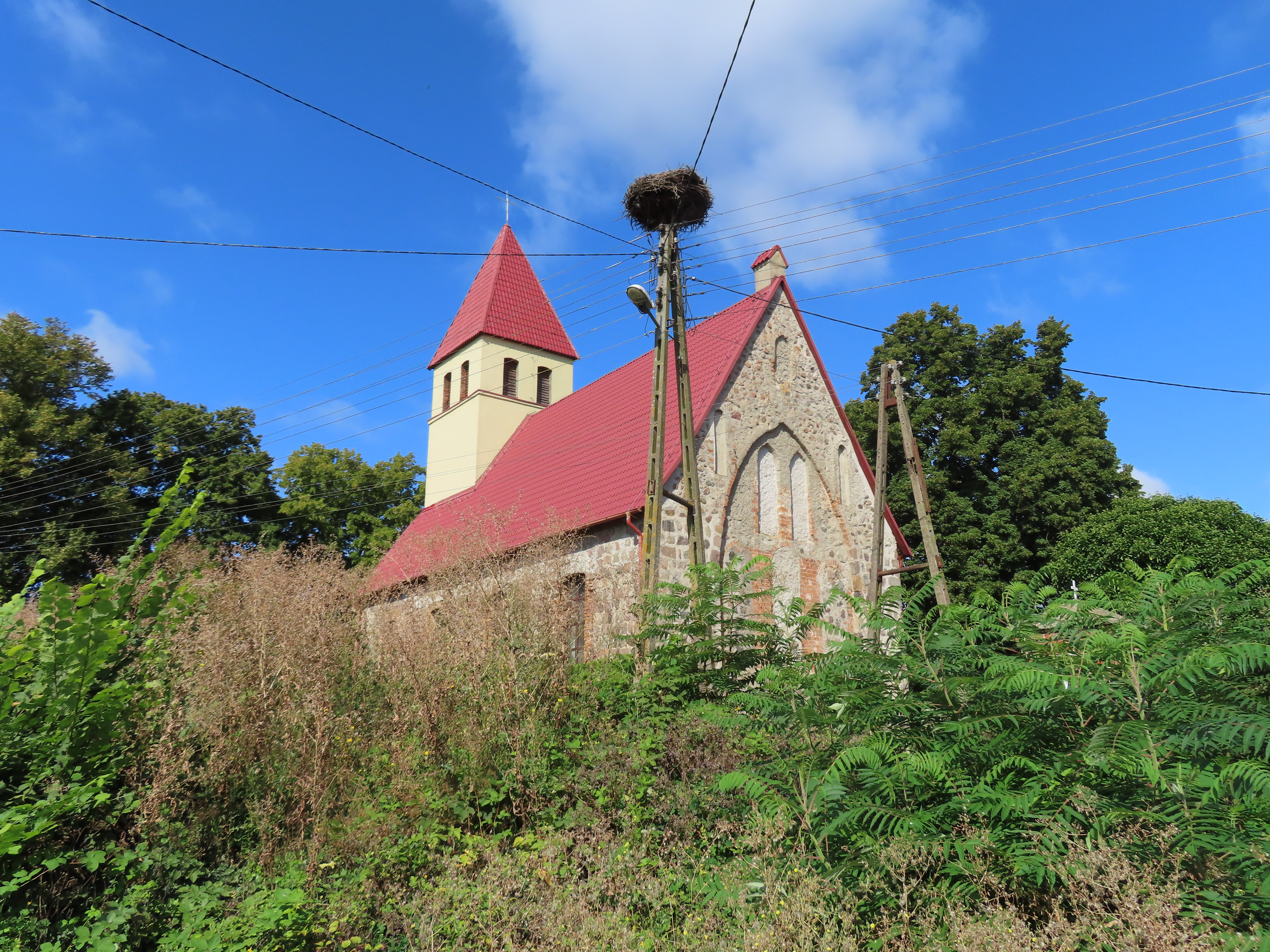

- Location within Poland
- Coordinates: 52°54′36″N 14°17′54″E
- Country: Poland
- Voivodeship: West Pomeranian
- County: Gryfino
- Gmina: Cedynia

Łukowice [wukɔˈvit͡sɛ] (German: Altenkirchen) is a village in the administrative district of Gmina Cedynia, within Gryfino County, West Pomeranian Voivodeship, in north-western Poland, close to the German border. It lies approximately 8 km (5 mi) north-east of Cedynia, 40 km (25 mi) south of Gryfino, and 60 km (37 mi) south of the regional capital Szczecin.
