= IS-100 =

IS-100 can refer to:

- The Soviet IS-2 heavy tank
- The introductory-level course on the Incident Command System, also known as I-100.
