= Hans Schilling (aviator) =

German aviator in World War I

- Born: 24 September 1892; Zäckerick, German Empire
- Died: 4 December 1916 (aged 24) near Flesquieres, France
- Military career
- Allegiance: German Empire
- Branch: Aviation Luftstreitkräfte
- Rank: Oberleutnant
- Unit: Flieger-Abteilung (Flier Detachment) 5, Flieger-Abteilung (Flier Detachment) 22
- Awards: Royal House Order of Hohenzollern, Iron Cross

Oberleutnant Hans Schilling (24 September 1892 – 4 December 1916) was an early World War I German observer flying ace. He scored his eight confirmed aerial victories teamed with Albert Dossenbach. The pair of them were shot down on 3 November 1916. Dossenbach was wounded; Schilling was burnt. As a result, Schilling was teamed with another pilot, and killed in action on 4 December 1916 by Charles Nungesser.

== Biography ==
Hans Schilling was born in Zäckerick (Prussian province of Brandenburg), now Siekierki (Poland), on 24 September 1892.

Schilling first comes to notice as an aerial observer with Flieger-Abteilung (Flier Detachment) 5 in an Albatros C.III's rear seat. However, he had no success until he transferred to Flieger-Abteilung (Flier Detachment) 22 and teamed with Albert Dossenbach. On 10 January 1916, the pair shot down a French Morane near Lille. Details of the next two aerial victories have been lost, except that Schilling and Dossenbach remained paired. Their fourth win came on 13 August 1916, when they downed Royal Aircraft Factory BE.12 number G549 from No. 19 Squadron RFC near Bapaume at 1845 hours.

His next victories came on 24, 26, and 27 September; they included another BE.12 from 19 Squadron, as well as a Royal Aircraft Factory BE.2b from No. 25 Squadron RFC, and an unidentified craft. The combat with the 25 Squadron plane was a double downing without injury, as Leslie Court also managed to bring down the German aircrew. On 12 October 1916, Schilling received the Knight's Cross of the House Order of Hohenzollern for his efforts; he was one of the few German observer aces. (The German decoration system being progressive, Schilling should have already received both classes of the Iron Cross.)

On 3 November 1916, they downed FE.2B number 6374 over Mory. However, they also came down that day, Dossenbach being lightly wounded and Schilling scorched. Schilling was reassigned to fly with a different pilot. On 4 December he was flying with Leutnant Rosenbachs in a two-seater Halberstadt. Just past noon, they were shot down and killed in action near Flesquieres; Charles Nungesser apparently vanquished them.
