= Gmina Cedynia =

Gmina Cedynia Cedynia Commune
- Gmina
- Coat of arms

- Location within Poland
- Coordinates (Cedynia): 52°53′N 14°12′E
- Country: Poland
- Voivodeship: West Pomeranian
- County: Gryfino
- Seat: Cedynia

Area
  - Total: 180.38 km^{2} (69.65 sq mi)

Population (2006)
  - Total: 4,343
  - Density: 24.08/km^{2} (62.36/sq mi)
  - Urban: 1,653
  - Rural: 2,690
- Website: https://www.cedynia.pl/

Gmina Cedynia is an urban-rural gmina (administrative district) in Gryfino County, West Pomeranian Voivodeship, in north-western Poland, on the German border. Its seat is the town of Cedynia, which lies approximately 45 kilometres (28 mi) south-west of Gryfino and 65 km (40 mi) south-west of the regional capital Szczecin.

The gmina covers an area of 180.38 square kilometres (69.6 sq mi), and as of 2006 its total population is 4,343 (out of which the population of Cedynia amounts to 1,653, and the population of the rural part of the gmina is 2,690).

The gmina contains part of the protected area called Cedynia Landscape Park.

== Villages ==
Apart from the town of Cedynia, Gmina Cedynia contains the villages and settlements of Barcie, Bielinek, Czachów, Golice, Lubiechów Dolny, Lubiechów Górny, Łukowice, Markocin, Niesułów, Orzechów, Osinów Dolny, Parchnica, Piasecznik, Piasek, Radostów, Siekierki, Stara Rudnica, Stary Kostrzynek, Trzypole and Żelichów.

== Neighbouring gminas ==
Gmina Cedynia is bordered by the gminas of Chojna, Mieszkowice and Moryń. It also borders Germany.
