= Osinów Dolny =

- Village
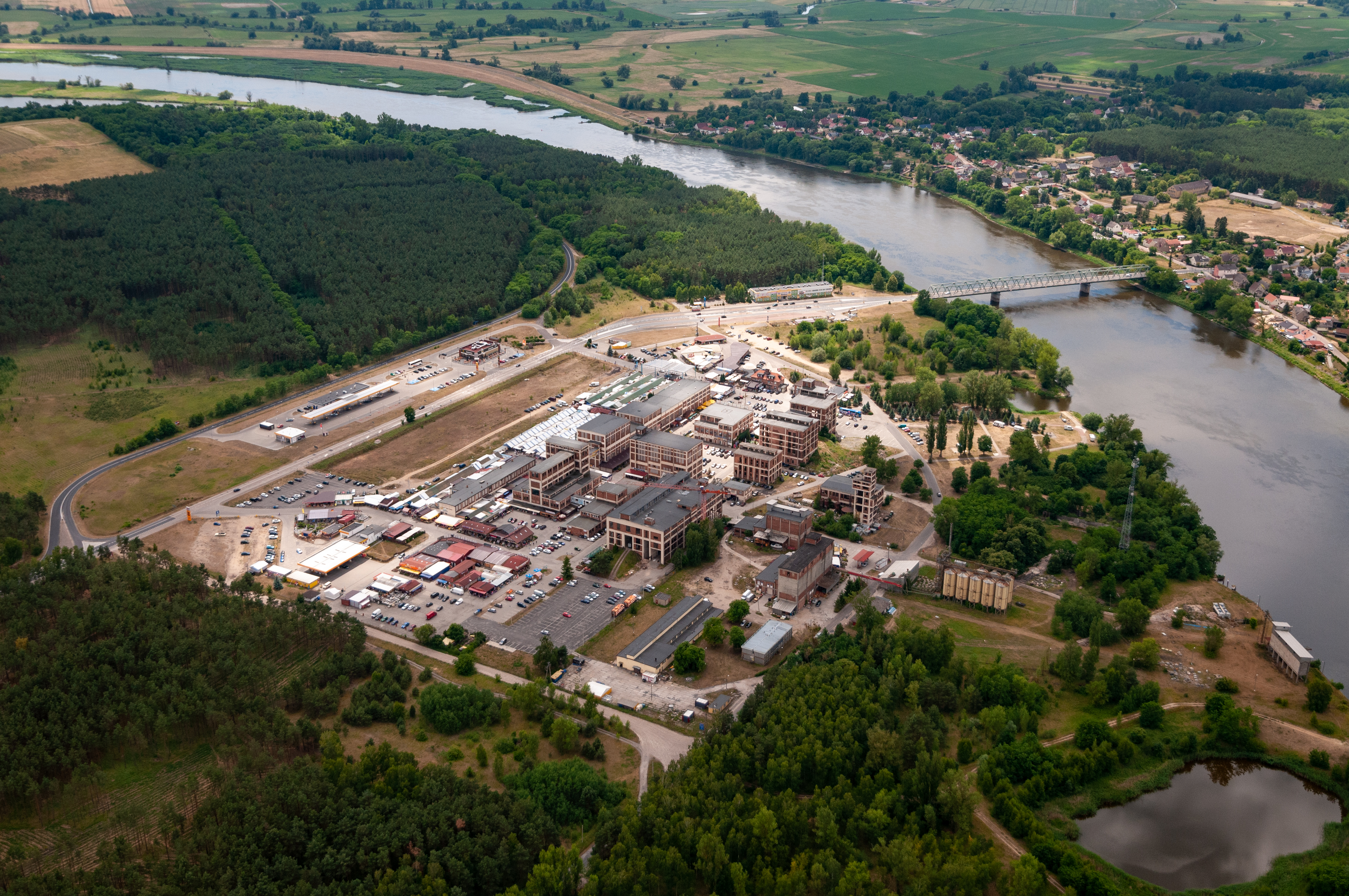
- Marketplace in Osinów Dolny. To the right across the Oder lies the German town of Hohenwutzen.

- Location within Poland
- Coordinates: 52°51′5″N 14°8′44″E
- Country: Poland
- Voivodeship: West Pomeranian
- County: Gryfino
- Gmina: Cedynia
- Population: 180
- Time zone: UTC+1 (CET)
  - Summer (DST): UTC+2 (CEST)
- Vehicle registration: ZGR

Osinów Dolny [ɔˈɕinuf ˈdɔlnɨ] (German: Niederwutzen) is Poland's westernmost settlement, in the administrative district of Gmina Cedynia, within Gryfino County, West Pomeranian Voivodeship, in north-western Poland, on the border with Germany. It lies approximately 6 km (4 mi) south-west of Cedynia, 50 km (31 mi) south-west of Gryfino, and 70 km (43 mi) south-west of the regional capital Szczecin.

The village has a population of 180. It is the site of a border crossing with Hohenwutzen, on the road connecting the Polish town of Chojna with Bad Freienwalde in Germany.

== History ==
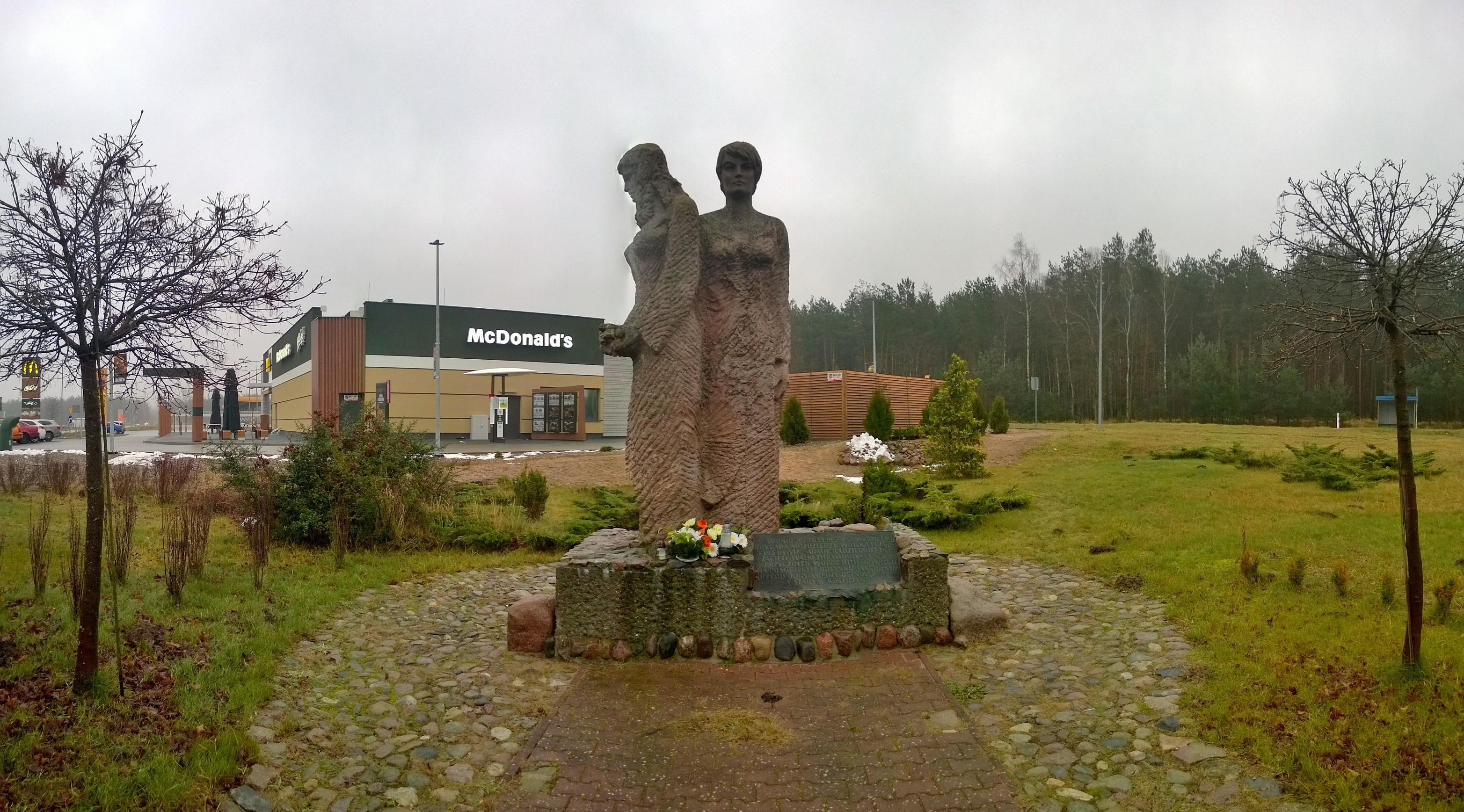
Monument to the Polish 1st Independent Mortar Brigade

Around 967, the area became part of the emerging Polish state. Following the fragmentation of Poland, it formed part of the Duchy of Greater Poland, and later on, it was also part of Brandenburg, Bohemia (Czechia), Prussia and from 1871 to 1945 also Germany, within which it was administratively located in the Frankfurt Region in the Province of Brandenburg.

There used to be a paper mill of minor regional importance in business here from 1936 to 1939. The paper mill was closed down; today its remaining structures are used as a marketplace.

In the final stages of World War II, in March 1945, it was the site of fights between joint Polish-Soviet forces and the German Wehrmacht. Afterwards, the area became again part of Poland, although with a Soviet-installed communist regime, which then stayed in power until the Fall of Communism in the 1980s. There is a monument to the Polish 1st Independent Mortar Brigade which fought in Osinów Dolny.

== Economy ==
A significant part of the village's economy comes from Germans crossing the border in search of cheaper products and services. When the border crossing was opened in 1993, thousands of Germans began visiting the village to buy goods and car gasoline. In recent years, it has been jokingly called "The Village of the Hairdressers", due to over half of the village's inhabitants being hairdressers, as a result of this international commerce.
