= Hohenwutzen =

Village in Brandenburg state, Germany

- Ortsteil of Bad Freienwalde
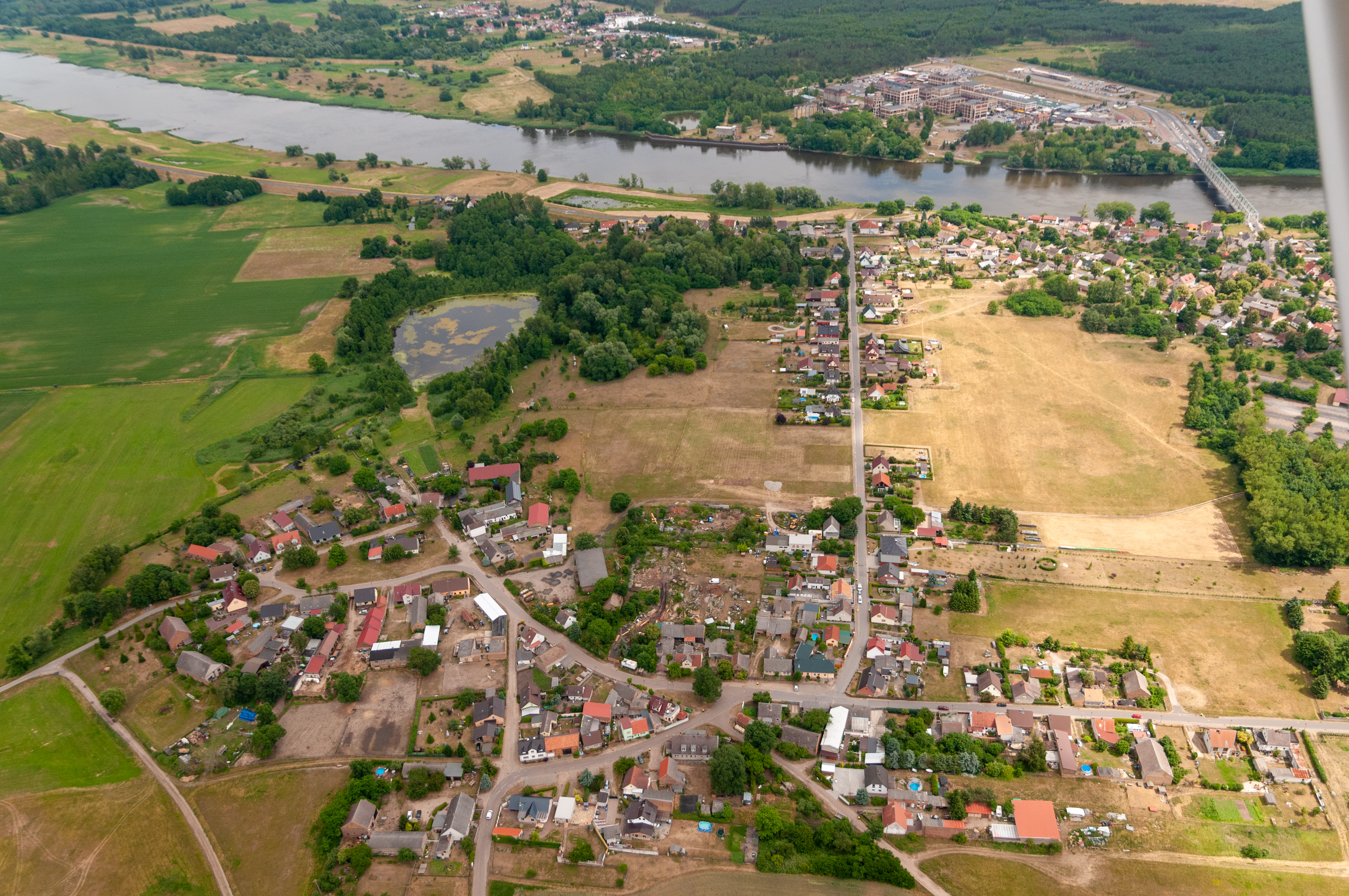
- Aerial view of Hohenwutzen looking east. Across the river lies Osinów Dolny (Niederwutzen).
- Interactive map of Hohenwutzen
- Location within Germany Location within Brandenburg
- Coordinates: 52°51′N 14°07′E
- Country: Germany
- State: Brandenburg
- Municipality: Bad Freienwalde
- Time zone: UTC+01:00 (CET)
  - Summer (DST): UTC+02:00 (CEST)

Hohenwutzen is a small village in the state of Brandenburg, in north-eastern Germany, located on the Oder river, on the border with Poland. Since 2003, Hohenwutzen is part of Bad Freienwalde.

It is one of the few villages of the historic Neumark region still in Germany after 1945.

It is the site of a border crossing on the main road connecting Bad Freienwalde, Germany with Chojna, Poland. The adjacent Polish village is called Osinów Dolny - which, when it used to be part of Germany, was called Niederwutzen; the toponyms Hohen- and Nieder- indicate "upper" and "lower" respectively. The name of the Polish settlement is a calque of the old German name.

== History ==
From 1815 to 1947, Hohenwutzen was part of the Prussian Province of Brandenburg, from 1947 to 1952 of the State of Brandenburg, from 1952 to 1990 of the Bezirk Frankfurt of East Germany and since 1990 again of Brandenburg, since 2003 as a part of Bad Freienwalde.
