= Czachów, West Pomeranian Voivodeship =

Czachów
- Village
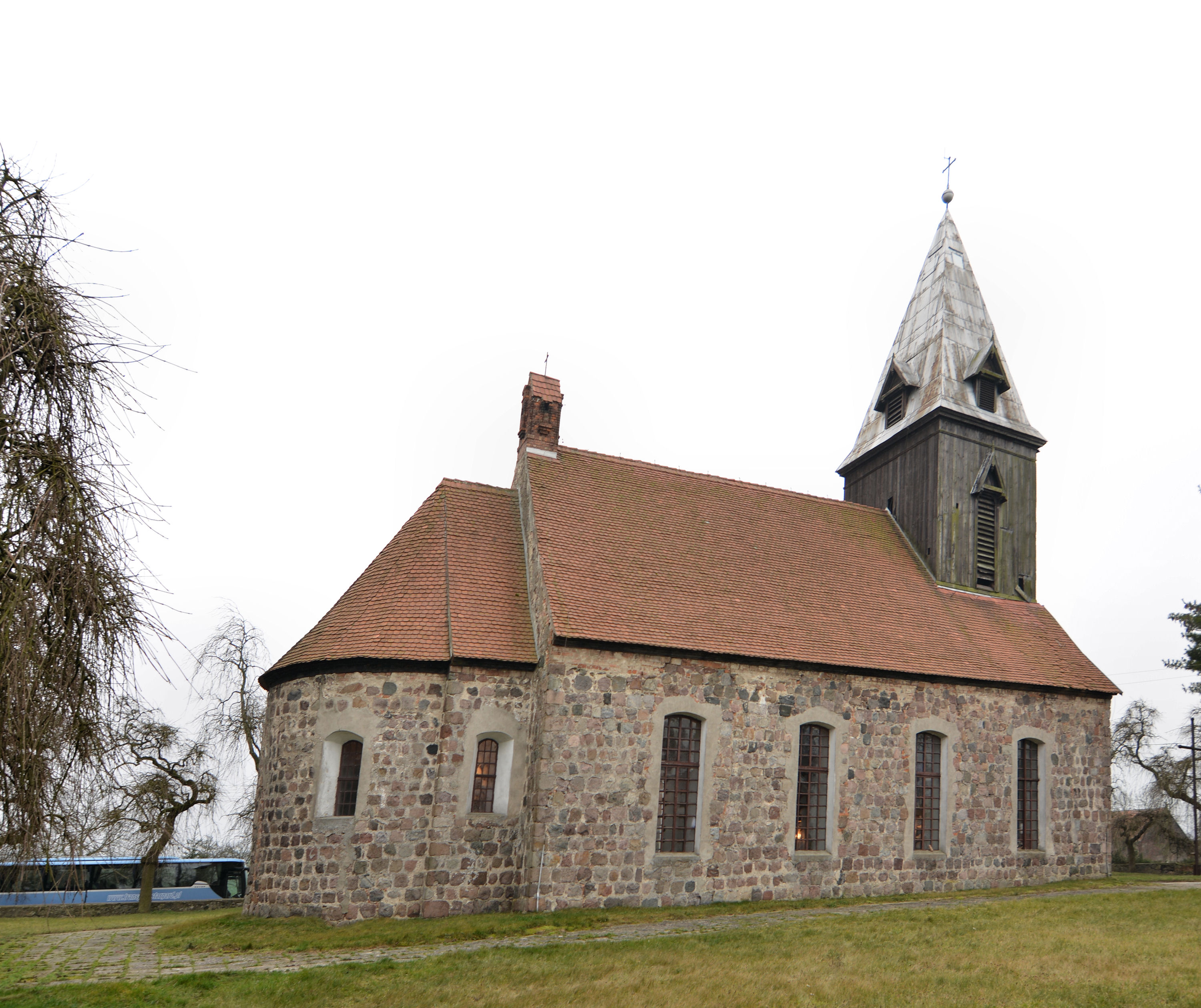
- Church in Czachów

- Location within Poland
- Coordinates: 52°54′40″N 14°16′3″E
- Country: Poland
- Voivodeship: West Pomeranian
- County: Gryfino
- Gmina: Cedynia
- Population: 220

Czachów [ˈt͡ʂaxuf] (German: Zachow) is a village in the administrative district of Gmina Cedynia, within Gryfino County, West Pomeranian Voivodeship, in north-western Poland, close to the German border. It lies approximately 6 km (4 mi) north-east of Cedynia, 41 km (25 mi) south of Gryfino, and 60 km (37 mi) south of the regional capital Szczecin.

For the history of the region, see History of Pomerania.

The village has a population of 220.
