= Piasecznik, Gryfino County =

Piasecznik
- Settlement
- Location within Poland
- Coordinates: 52°56′15″N 14°17′26″E
- Country: Poland
- Voivodeship: West Pomeranian
- County: Gryfino
- Gmina: Cedynia
- Population (2023): 0

Piasecznik [pjaˈsɛt͡ʂnik] (German: Försterei Klein Peetzig) is a settlement in Gmina Cedynia, within Gryfino County, West Pomeranian Voivodeship, in north-western Poland, close to the German border.

For the history of the region, see History of Pomerania.

== Demographics ==
Historical population

Year	Pop.	±%
1895	5	—
2010	2	−60.0%
2011	2	+0.0%
2012	2	+0.0%
2013	2	+0.0%
2014	2	+0.0%
2015	3	+50.0%
2016	2	−33.3%

Year	Pop.	±%
2017	2	+0.0%
2018	2	+0.0%
2019	0	−100.0%
2020	0	0.00%
2021	0	0.00%
2022	0	0.00%
2023	0	0.00%

Data may be affected by territorial fluctuation.
Sources: 1895, 2010-2023
