= Niesułów =

- Settlement
- Location within Poland
- Coordinates: 52°53′37″N 14°14′36″E
- Country: Poland
- Voivodeship: West Pomeranian
- County: Gryfino
- Gmina: Cedynia

Niesułów [ɲɛˈsuwuf] (German: Neues Vorwerk) is a settlement in the administrative district of Gmina Cedynia, within Gryfino County, West Pomeranian Voivodeship, in north-western Poland, close to the German border.

For the history of the region, see History of Pomerania.
