= Barcie, West Pomeranian Voivodeship =

Barcie
- Settlement
- Location within Poland
- Coordinates: 52°55′52″N 14°13′19″E
- Country: Poland
- Voivodeship: West Pomeranian
- County: Gryfino
- Gmina: Cedynia

Barcie [ˈbart͡ɕɛ] (German: Försterei Schneidemühle) is a settlement in the administrative district of Gmina Cedynia, within Gryfino County, West Pomeranian Voivodeship, in north-western Poland, close to the German border.

For the history of the region, see History of Pomerania.
