= Albert Dossenbach =

German flying ace

- Born: 5 June 1891; Sankt Blasien, Grand Duchy of Baden, German Empire
- Died: 3 July 1917 (aged 26); Ypres, Belgium
- Military career
- Allegiance: German Empire
- Branch: Luftstreitkräfte
- Service years: 1914 - 1917
- Rank: Leutnant
- Units: Flieger-Abteilung (Flier Detachment) 22; Feldflieger Abteilung (Field Flier Detachment) 2; Jagdstaffel 2
- Commands: Jagdstaffel 36; Jagdstaffel 10
- Awards: Prussia: Pour le Merite; Prussia: Royal House Order of Hohenzollern; Prussia: Iron Cross; Baden: Knight's Cross of Karl Friedrich Military Merit Order

Leutnant Albert Dossenbach (5 June 1891 – 3 July 1917) was a World War I flying ace credited with 15 aerial victories.

== Early life and army service ==
Albert Dossenbach was born on 5 June 1891 at Sankt Blasien in the Grand Duchy of Baden. Dossenbach was a medical student (member of „Burschenschaft Alemannia Freiburg“) working as an intern when World War I began in 1914. He joined the Imperial German Army as the war began and almost immediately became a lance corporal. Within his first month of his service, he carried his wounded commanding officer from the battlefield under fire. This feat won him the Iron Cross Second Class. His valor continued, as he won the First Class Iron Cross, the Military Merit Order, and rose to the rank of sergeant. He was then commissioned as a leutnant in January 1915.

== Flying service ==
In early 1916, he transferred to the Luftstreitkräfte. He trained in Poznan and in Cologne, and graduated from Jastaschule in June. His first assignment as a pilot was in June to Flieger-Abteilung 22, a reconnaissance unit flying on the Western Front. With Leutnant Hans Schilling as his observer/gunner in an Albatros C.III reconnaissance craft, he began to rack up victories; by 27 September 1916, his tally was eight. However, they were shot down during their eighth victory, with Dossenbach suffering burns that sidelined him. Dossenbach's valor earned him further honors; on 20 October 1916, he was awarded the Knight's Cross of the House Order of Hohenzollern. The Pour le Merite, or Blue Max, was awarded to him on 11 November 1916; it was the first of only two ever awarded to a two-seater pilot.

While Dossenbach healed, Schilling had been assigned to fly with another pilot, and was killed in December 1916. On 9 December, Dossenbach received the Knight's Cross of his native Baden's Karl Friedrich Military Merit Order.

Dossenbach scored once more with FA 22 before being transferred on 9 February 1917 to the famed Royal Prussian Jasta 2 (Jasta Boelcke) to train as a fighter pilot. Upon graduation, on 22 February 1917, he was appointed to command Royal Prussian Jasta 36. He began the new squadron's victory list by scoring five times during Bloody April, 1917. One of these triumphs, on 13 April 1917, was over French ace Marcel Nogues.

On 2 May 1917, Dossenbach was wounded during a bombing raid; the wound removed him from command. Upon recovery, he requested his return to active duty. As a result, he took command of Royal Prussian Jasta 10 on 21 June 1917. He then turned balloon buster for his 15th and final victory on 27 June 1917.

== Death in action ==
On 3 July 1917, Dossenbach's plane was set afire during a dogfight with four British machines, as he was shot down by Captain Laurence Minot and observer, Lieutenant Arthur Britton in an Airco DH.4 of No. 57 Squadron RFC. Dossenbach departed the flaming wreckage in midair as it fell. Leutnant Albert Dossenbach was buried in Freiburg im Breisgau, Germany.
