= IS-2 =

Soviet heavy tank

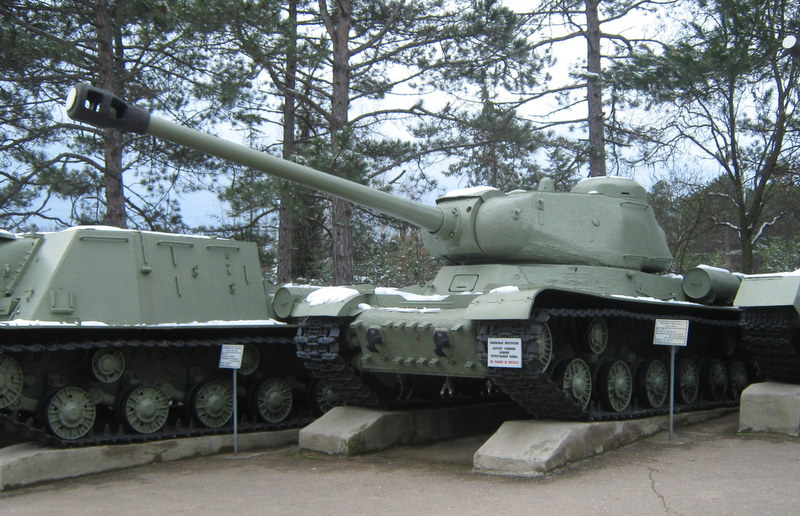
- IS-2 Model 1943, in Sevastopol
- Type: Heavy tank
- Place of origin: Soviet Union

Service history
- In service: 1944–1970s
- Used by: See Operators
- Wars: World War II, Korean War

Production history
- Designer: Zhozef Kotin; Nikolay Dukhov
- Designed: 1943
- Manufacturer: Kirov Factory, UZTM
- Unit cost: IS-2 Model 1944: 300,000 rubles
- Produced: 1943–1945
- No. built: 3,854 (all models)

Specifications (IS-2 Model 1944)
- Mass: 46 tonnes (51 short tons; 45 long tons)
- Length: 9.90 m (32 ft 6 in)
- Width: 3.09 m (10 ft 2 in)
- Height: 2.73 m (8 ft 11 in)
- Crew: 4 (Commander/Radio Operator, Gunner, Loader, Driver
- Armor: IS-2 Model 1944: Hull front: 100 mm at 60° angle Lower glacis: 100 mm at 30° angle Turret front: 100 mm (rounded); Mantlet: 120 mm (rounded); Hull side: 90–130 mm at 9-25° Turret side: 90 mm at 20° angle.
- Main armament: D-25T 122 mm gun (28 rounds)
- Secondary armament: 1×DShK, 3×DT (2,079 rounds)
- Engine: V-2-10 (V-2IS) diesel (V-12 configuration) based on the Kharkiv model V-2; 520 metric horsepower (382 kW)
- Power/weight: 11.3 PS/tonne
- Suspension: torsion bar
- Fuel capacity: 820 L (180 imp gal; 220 US gal)
- Operational range: Road: 240 km (150 mi); Cross-country: 180 km (110 mi)
- Maximum speed: 37 km/h (23 mph)

The IS-2 (Russian: ИС-2, sometimes romanized as JS-2 (Note: The series name is an abbreviation of the name Joseph Stalin (Russian: Иосиф Сталин); IS-2 is a direct transliteration of the Russian abbreviation, while JS-2 is an abbreviation of the English or German form of Stalin's name.)) is a Soviet heavy tank, the second of the IS tank series named after Soviet leader Joseph Stalin. It was developed and saw combat during World War II and saw service in other Soviet allied countries after the war.

== Design and production ==
=== Object 237 KV-85 and IS-85/IS-1 ===
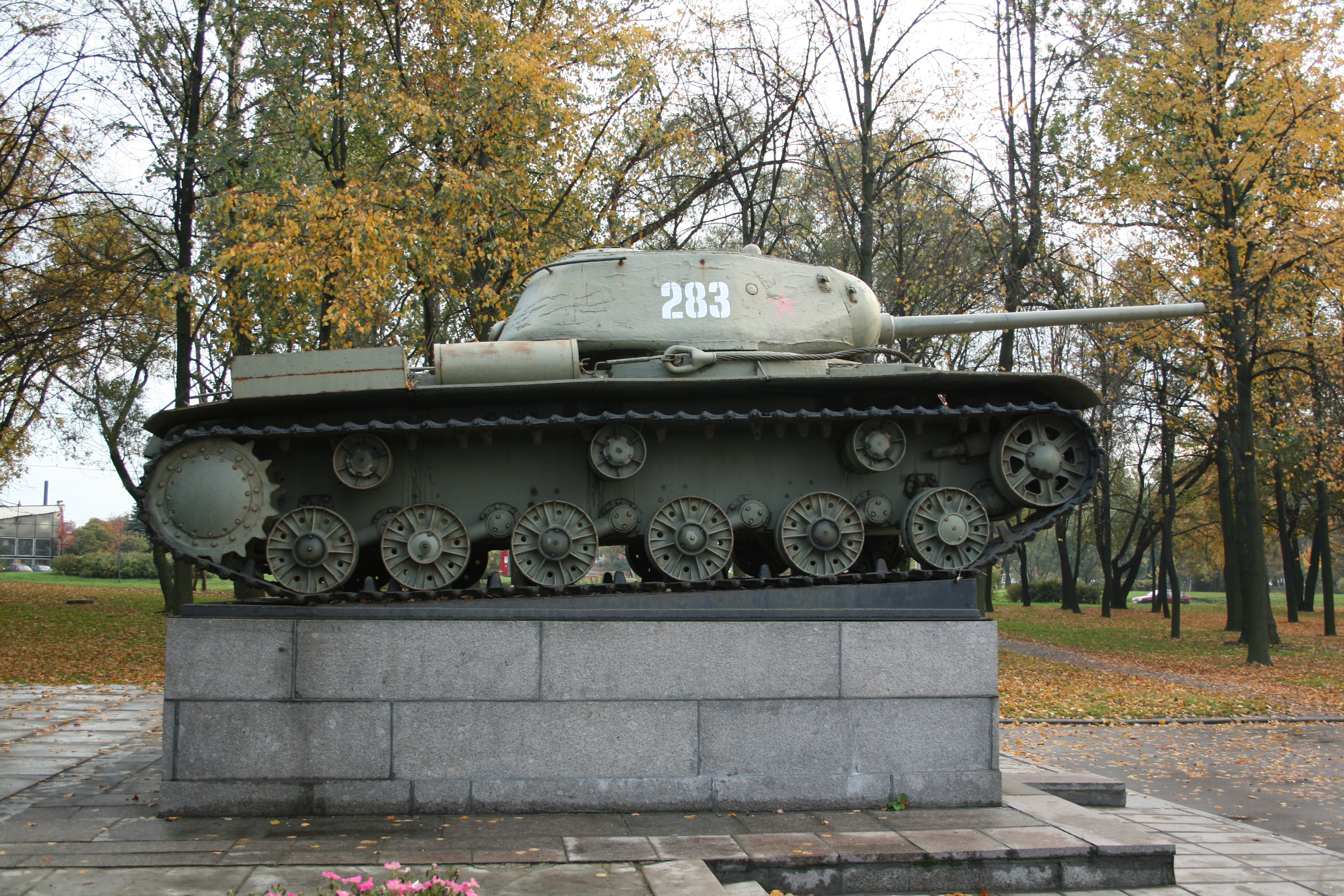
The KV-85 was a stop-gap solution until the introduction of the IS series. Note the modified KV chassis with the removal of the hull machine-gunner/ radio operator's station with one operated by the driver, and the driver's station slightly centered at the front; a staple design of all IS-series tanks.

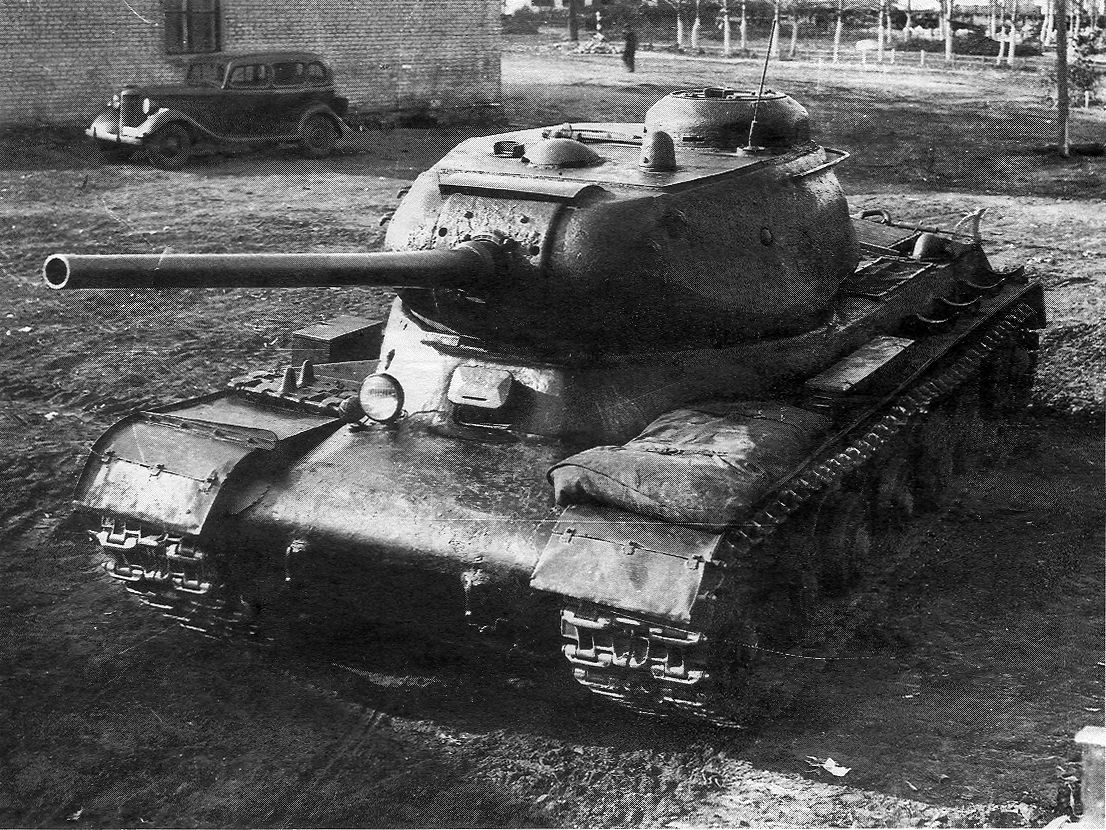
IS-85 (IS-1) Prototype equipped with D-5T gun. Later IS-2 converted models were replaced with the 122mm D-25T gun whilst retaining the same hull.

The KV-1 was criticized by its crews for its poor mobility and the lack of a larger caliber gun than the T-34 medium tank. It was much more expensive than the T-34, without having greater combat performance. Moscow ordered some KV-1 assembly lines to shift to T-34 production, leading to fears that KV-1 production would be halted, and the SKB-2 design bureau, led by Kotin, closed. In 1942, this problem was partially addressed by the KV-1S tank, which had thinner armor than the original, making it lighter and faster. It was competitive with the T-34 but at the cost of no longer having the heavier armor. Production of the KV-1S was gradually replaced by the SU-152 and ended in April 1943.

The capture of a German Tiger tank in January 1943 led to a decision to develop a new heavy tank, which was given the codename Object 237. Before Object 237 had time to mature, intense tank fighting in the summer of 1943 demanded a response. Dukhov's team was instructed to create a stopgap KV tank, the KV-85, which was armed with the 52-K-derivative gun of the SU-85, the 85 mm D-5T, that proved capable of penetrating the Tiger I from 1,000 m (1,100 yd). The KV-85 was created by mounting an Object 237 turret on a KV-1S hull. To accommodate the Object 237 turret, the KV-1S hull was modified, increasing the diameter of the turret ring with fillets on the sides of the hull. The radio operator was replaced with an ammunition rack for the larger 85 mm ammunition. The hull MG was then moved to the opposite side of the driver and fixed in place to be operated by the driver. From September to October 1943, a total of 130 KV-85s were produced, before the assembly lines began to shift over. Like the KV-1S, the KV-85 served in dwindling numbers and was quickly overshadowed by the superior IS series.

The Object 237 prototype, a version of the cancelled KV-13, was accepted for production as the IS-85 heavy tank. First deliveries were made in October 1943, and the tanks went immediately into service. Production ended in January 1944. Its designation was simplified to IS-1 after the introduction of the IS-122, later renamed as IS-2 for security purposes.

=== Object 240 IS-2 ===
==== Gun ====
By 1943, engineers had succeeded in mounting the 85 mm gun to the T-34 medium tank, making it as well-armed as the KV-85 heavy tank. Efforts to up-gun the IS-85 began in late 1943. Two candidate weapons were the D-25 122 mm tank gun, the ballistic characteristics of which were identical to the A-19 122 mm gun, and the D-10 100 mm gun, which was based on a dual-purpose naval gun. The D-10 had been designed for anti-tank fire and had better armor penetration than the A-19, but the smaller caliber meant it had a less useful high explosive round. Also, the D-10 was a relatively new weapon in short supply, while there was excess production capacity for the A-19 and its ammunition. Compared to the older F-34 76.2 mm tank gun, the D-25 delivered 5.37 times the muzzle energy.

After testing both the D-25 and D-10 on the IS-122, the former was selected as the main armament of the new tank. The D-25 used a separate shell and powder charge, resulting in a lower rate of fire compared to the single-piece ammunition used in most tanks, a serious disadvantage in tank-to-tank engagements. Soviet proving-ground tests showed that the D-25 could penetrate the front armor of the German Panther at 2,500 m (2,700 yd) while the D-10 could do so at a maximum range of 1,500 m (1,600 yd). It was therefore considered an adequate anti-tank gun. First deliveries of IS-122s mounted with this gun were in December 1943.

Projectiles and charges of the separate-loading ammunition of the A-19/D-25T 122mm gun. Left to right: cartridge case, high-explosive/ fragmentation shell OF-471, armor-piercing high explosive shell BR-471, armor-piercing ballistic capped shell BR-471B. All shells are shown from two sides.

A Wa Pruef 1 Report dated 5 October 1944 has data on the penetration ranges of the 122 mm A-19 gun against a Panther tank angled at 30 degrees; this estimated that the A-19 gun was unable to penetrate the upper glacis plate of the Panther from any distance, could penetrate the lower glacis plate from 100 m (110 yd), could penetrate the mantlet from 500 m (550 yd) and could penetrate the front turret from 1,500 m (1,600 yd). The side armour of the Panther was comparatively weaker and could be penetrated at 3,500 m (3,800 yd) according to the same report. Testing^{[unangled?]} with captured Tiger I tanks in Kubinka showed that the 122 mm D-25T was capable of penetrating the Tiger's turret from 1,000–1,500 m (1,100–1,600 yd) and the weld joint or edges of the front hull plates at ranges of 500–600 m (550–660 yd). In 1944, the BR-471 was the sole armor-piercing round available. An improved version, the BR-471B (Russian: БР-471Б) was developed in spring 1945 but was available in quantity only after World War II ended.

Also according to the Wa Pruef 1 report, it was estimated that at 30 degree obliquity the hull armor of the Soviet IS-2 model 1943 would be defeated by a Tiger I between 100 and 300 m (0.062 and 0.186 mi) at the driver's front plate and nose, while the IS-2's 122 mm gun would penetrate the Tiger's front armor from between 500 and 1,500 m (0.31 and 0.93 mi). A Panther had to close to 600 m (660 yd) to guarantee penetration of the IS-2's frontal armor (The Panther's 75 mm gun could penetrate the IS-2 model 1943's mantlet from 400 m (440 yd), front turret from 800 m (870 yd), and driver's front plate from 600 m (660 yd)), while the IS-2 could penetrate the Panther at ranges of 1,000 m (1,100 yd). However, in the summer of 1944, the Germans experienced a shortage of manganese and had to switch to using high-carbon steel alloyed with nickel, which made armor very brittle, especially at the seam welds. The performance of the 122 mm AP shells of the IS-2 against the Panther improved considerably. The reports from the front described cases where the BR-471 APHE round 122 mm projectile fired from 2,500 m (2,700 yd) ricocheted off the front armor of a Panther, leaving huge breaches in it. According to Steven Zaloga, the IS-2 and Tiger I could knock each other out in normal combat distances below 1,000 m (1,100 yd). At any range, the performance of each tank against each other was dependent on the crew and combat situation.

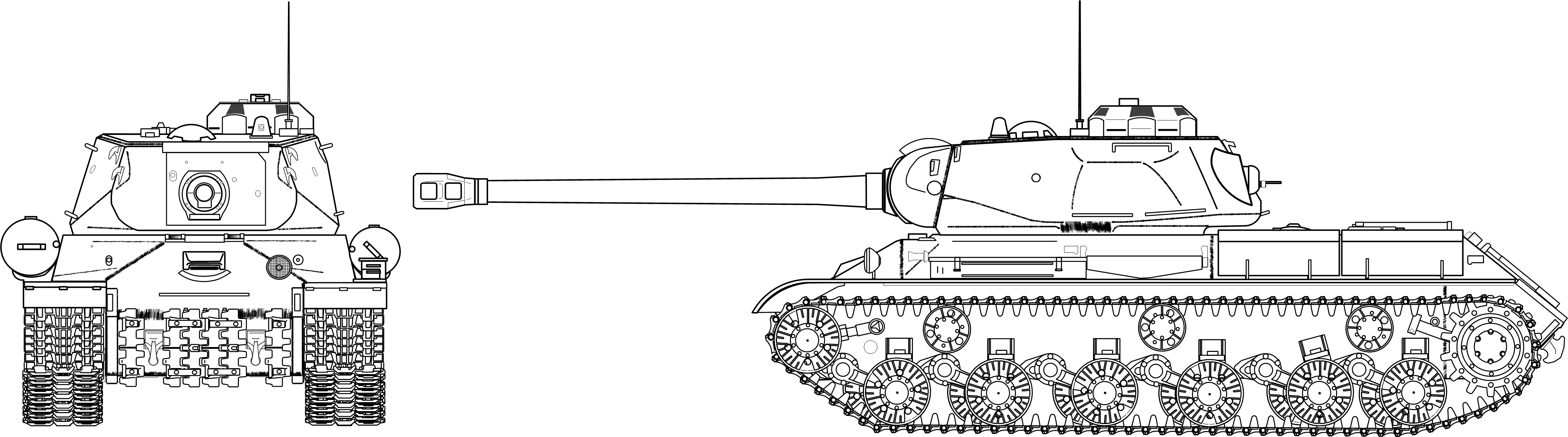
Line drawing of IS-2

The large 122 mm HE shell was its main asset, proving highly useful and destructive as an infantry-killer. In extremis, the IS-2 engaged enemy heavy armor with OF-471 (Russian: ОФ-471) high explosive projectiles. These shells weighed 25 kg (55 lb), a muzzle velocity of 800 m/s (2,600 ft/s), and were equipped with a 3.8 kg (8.4 lb) TNT charge. The explosive power could blow off an enemy tank turret, drive sprocket and tread off the heaviest German tank even if it could not penetrate the armor. Mechanical shock and explosion was often enough to knock out enemy heavy tanks.

The most recognizable disadvantage of the D-25T gun was its slow rate of fire due to the large size and weight of the shells; only one to one and a half rounds per minute could be fired, initially. After some design improvements, including a semi-automatic drop breech over the previously manual screw breech, the rate of fire increased to 2–3 rounds per minute. According to other sources, the increase may have been to 3–4 rounds per minute. Another limitation imposed by the size of its ammunition in a relatively small vehicle was the ammunition stowage: only 28 rounds could be carried inside the tank, with a complement of 20 HE rounds, and 8 AP rounds the norm.

==== Protection ====
The IS-2's armour was primarily composed from casting, which involves pouring molten metal into a mold and letting it cool. This method was done to reduce production costs and thus increase the number of vehicles that could be built (in contrast to its contemporary the Tiger II, which required significant machining in its construction). Casting also made it easier to vary the shape and thickness of the armour, which also reduced the exterior surface relative to tank volume. However, casting had to account for the metal shrinking as it cooled (becoming denser) and with limitations on Soviet casting technology, IS-2 armour thickness could vary even when produced from the same mold. Lower-quality alloys had to sometimes be used, substituting manganese for nickel, meaning that while the armour had high hardness and resisted penetration better than steel, it was also quite brittle and thus at risk of shattering.

==== Production ====
The IS-122 prototype replaced the IS-85 and began mass production as the IS-2. The 85 mm guns could be reserved for the new T-34-85 medium tank and some of the IS-1s built were rearmed before leaving the factory and issued as IS-2s. It was slightly lighter and faster than the heaviest KV model 1942 tank, with thicker front armor and a much-improved turret design. The tank could carry thicker armor than the KV series, while remaining lighter, due to the better layout of the armor envelope. The KV's armor was less well-shaped and featured heavy armor even on the rear, while the IS series concentrated its armor at the front. The IS-2 was slightly heavier than the Panther, much lighter than the Tiger I and Tiger II and had a lower silhouette than both. Western observers tended to criticize Soviet tanks for their lack of finish and crude construction. The Soviets argued that it was warranted, considering the need for wartime expediency and the typically short battlefield life of their tanks.

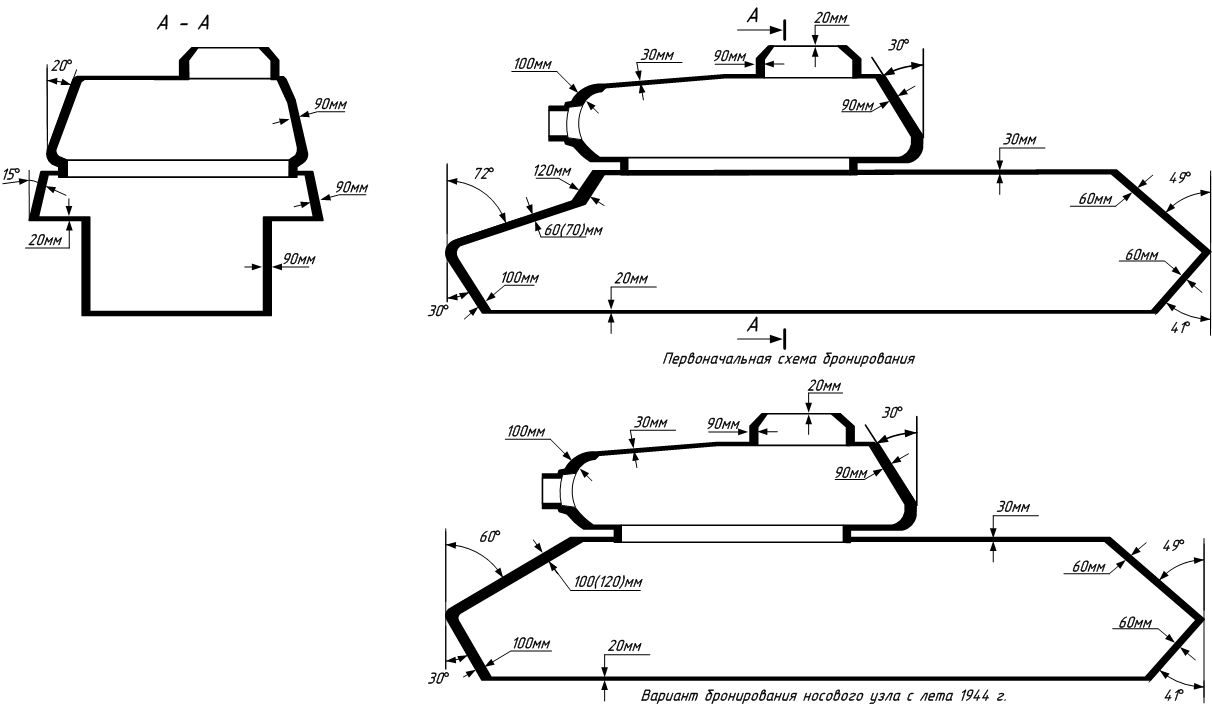
Armor plan of IS-2, models 1943 (top) and 1944 (bottom).

Early IS-2s can be identified by the 'stepped' front hull casting with its small, opening driver's visor. The early tanks lacked gun tube travel locks or anti-aircraft-capable machine guns and had narrow mantlets.

In late 1944, the stepped hull front was replaced with an improved single casting of 120 mm thickness angled at 60 degrees. This new nose lacked the opening driver's visor. It is sometimes incorrectly referred to as the IS-2M, but that designation actually refers to a much later modernization program from the 1950s. Other minor upgrades included the addition of a travel lock on the hull rear, wider mantlet and, on very late models, an anti-aircraft machine gun. However, the model 1944 did not fully replace the model 1943.

In comparison to the Tiger I, the IS-2 had advantages in armour, even though it was 10 tons lighter. In 1944, the IS-2 and the British A22F Heavy Churchill were the only two large-scale Allied tanks whose armor provided some protection from the Tiger's feared 88mm long-barreled gun and the Panther's 75mm L/70 gun.

The IS-2 was succeeded by the IS-3, which was developed in late 1944 and left the factory shop in May 1945.

In the mid-1950s, the remaining IS-2 tanks (mostly model 1944 variants although several model 1943 variants) were upgraded to the IS-2M standard, which introduced fittings such as external fuel tanks on the rear hull (the basic IS-2 had these only on the hull sides), stowage bins on both sides of the hull and protective skirting along the top edges of the tracks.

== Combat history ==
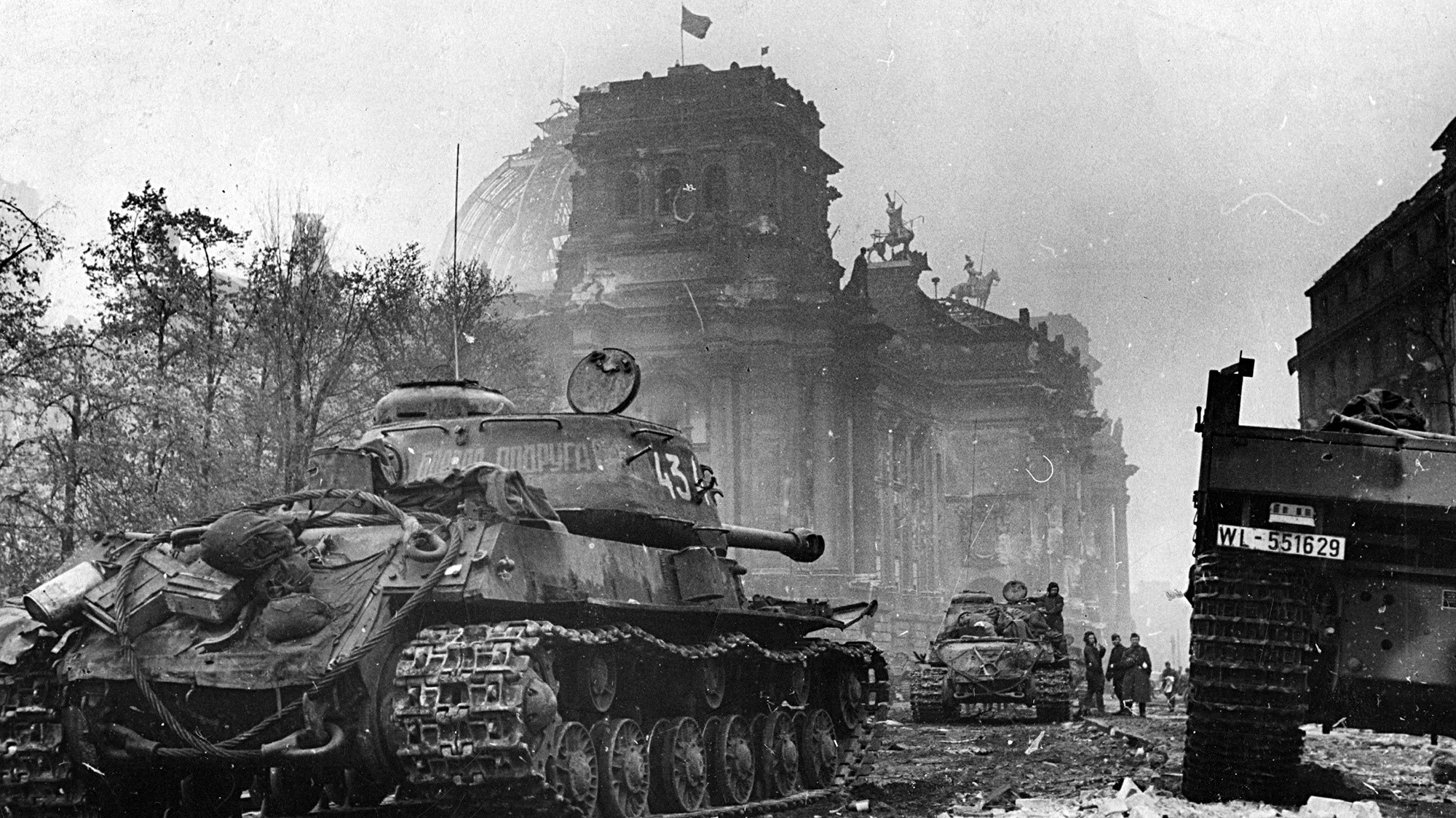
IS-2s of the 7th Separate Guards Heavy Tank Brigade by the Reichstag, 2 May 1945

The IS-2 tank first saw combat in early 1944, equipping elite Guards Heavy Tank Regiments of the Red Army. A regiment had 21 IS-2 tanks in four companies of five tanks each and one being used by the regimental commander. The special tank regiments were reserved for important attacks, often to spearhead attempts to break through fortified German positions like anti-tank defence lines and bunkers. The tanks supported infantry in the assault by destroying bunkers, buildings, dug-in weapons and engaging German armoured vehicles. Once a breakthrough was achieved, lighter and more mobile tanks were used for exploitation and mopping-up. The IS-2 tank first saw action in Ukraine in early 1944 and claimed to have destroyed more than forty Tigers and Elefants for the loss of only eight tanks.

On the morning of 11 August 1944, the 16th Panzer Division attacked the 53rd Guards Tank Brigade reinforced by the 71st Independent Guards Heavy Tank Regiment in the town of Oględów, toward Staszów. The extremely sandy terrain forced the eleven King Tigers to keep to the roads, whilst the defending Soviet forces positioned their tanks and assault guns in ambush positions and concentrated on the known German avenues of approach. When the attack started, three Tiger IIs were destroyed by fire from Soviet IS-2 tanks at a range of 800 m (2,600 ft), and one more Tiger II was knocked out a few hours later by a T-34/76 at a range of less than 400 m (1,300 ft). Later in the day, Soviet forces counter-attacked and seized the town of Oględów and found three abandoned Tiger IIs. The capture of these tanks allowed the Soviets to conduct tests at Kubinka and to evaluate its strengths and weaknesses.

=== Post World War II ===
By the 1950s, the emergence of the main battle tank concept—combining medium-tank mobility with the firepower and armor of the heavy tank—had rendered heavy tanks obsolete. In the late 1960s the remaining Soviet heavy tanks were transferred to Red Army reserve service and storage. The IS-2 Model 1944 remained in service much longer in the armies of Cuba, China and North Korea. A regiment of Chinese IS-2s was available for use in the Korean War but saw no service there.

== Variants ==
KV-85 (Object 239)
A stopgap model built from a modified KV-1S hull mated to an Object 237(IS-1)'s turret and armed with the 85 mm D-5T. An alternate prototype designated KV-85G (for Grabin, who designed S-31 gun) or Object 238, which had 85 mm S-31 mounted in normal KV-1s tank existed but proved inferior to normal KV-85 and never reached production.
IS-85 (IS-1)
1943 model armed with an 85 mm gun. When IS-2 production started, many were re-gunned with 122 mm guns before being issued.
IS-100
Two prototype versions armed with different 100 mm guns, IS-4/Object 245 with D-10T and IS-5/Object 248 with S-34; it went into trials against the IS-122 which was armed with a 122 mm gun. Though the IS-100 was reported to have better anti-armor capabilities, the latter was chosen due to better all-around performance.
IS-122 (IS-2 model 1943)
1943 model, earlier tanks were armed with early version of 122 mm D-25T gun with interrupted screw breech and different muzzle brake (strongly tapering towards end, similar to ones found on most German tanks), later used standard version of D-25T with falling block breech and pear-shaped muzzle brake.
IS-2 model 1944 (sometimes referred as "IS-2m")
1944 improvement with improved simpler hull front. Armored hulls were produced by No.200 plant (cast) and UZTM (welded) simultaneously. A 12.7mm DShK heavy machine gun was installed for anti-aircraft purposes.
IS-2M
1957 (although received IS-2M index only in 1960) technological modernization of pre-existing IS-2 tanks. New hull sides with integrated stowage boxes, T-10M tracks and roadwheels, machine gun in turret rear replaced by ventilation fan and many other minor technical improvements.

== Operators ==
China

- People's Liberation Army: 60 IS-2s delivered in 1950–1951. Operated during the Korean War and in concrete bunkers along the Sino-Soviet border.

Cuba

- Cuban Army: 41 IS-2Ms delivered in 1960.

Czechoslovakia

- Czechoslovak Army: 8 IS-2/IS-2M in service between 1945-1960.

East Germany

- NVA: 60 IS-2 delivered 1956. Operated until 1963.

Nazi Germany

- Wehrmacht: Captured one or two IS-2 in May 1945.

Hungary

- Hungarian People's Army: At least one IS-1 was captured during World War II, and 68 IS-2s were in service between 1950–1956. After the crackdown of the Hungarian Revolution of 1956 all were returned to the Soviet Union.

North Korea

- Korean People's Army: Small number of IS-2s; unknown number deployed in combat in the Korean War.

Poland

- Polish People's Army: Approximately 71 IS-2s used in combat between 1944–1945. 180 IS-2s survived as of 1955 and remained in service until the 1960s; some later were converted to armoured recovery vehicles.

Romania

- Romanian Land Forces: At least one IS-2 captured during May–June 1944. Two armored recovery vehicles based on the IS-2 chassis were received by 1 January 1956.

Soviet Union

- Red Army: Heavy Breakthrough Tank from 1944-1945.
- Soviet Army: Phased out of service in the early 1970s.

== Surviving vehicles ==
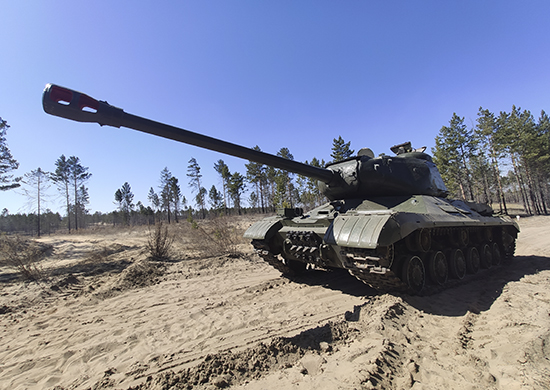
The restored IS-2M tank at the Eastern Military District training ground. June 2021

There are several surviving IS-1 and IS-2 tanks, with examples found at the following:

IS-2

- Os. Górali [standing tank], Kraków, Poland
- Polish Army Museum, Warsaw, Poland
- Museum of Arms in Fort Winiary, Poznań, Poland
- Outdoor exhibition in Chrobry Park, Lębork, Poland
- Museum of Armoured Weapon in Training Center of Land Forces, Poznań, Poland (operational, see movie)

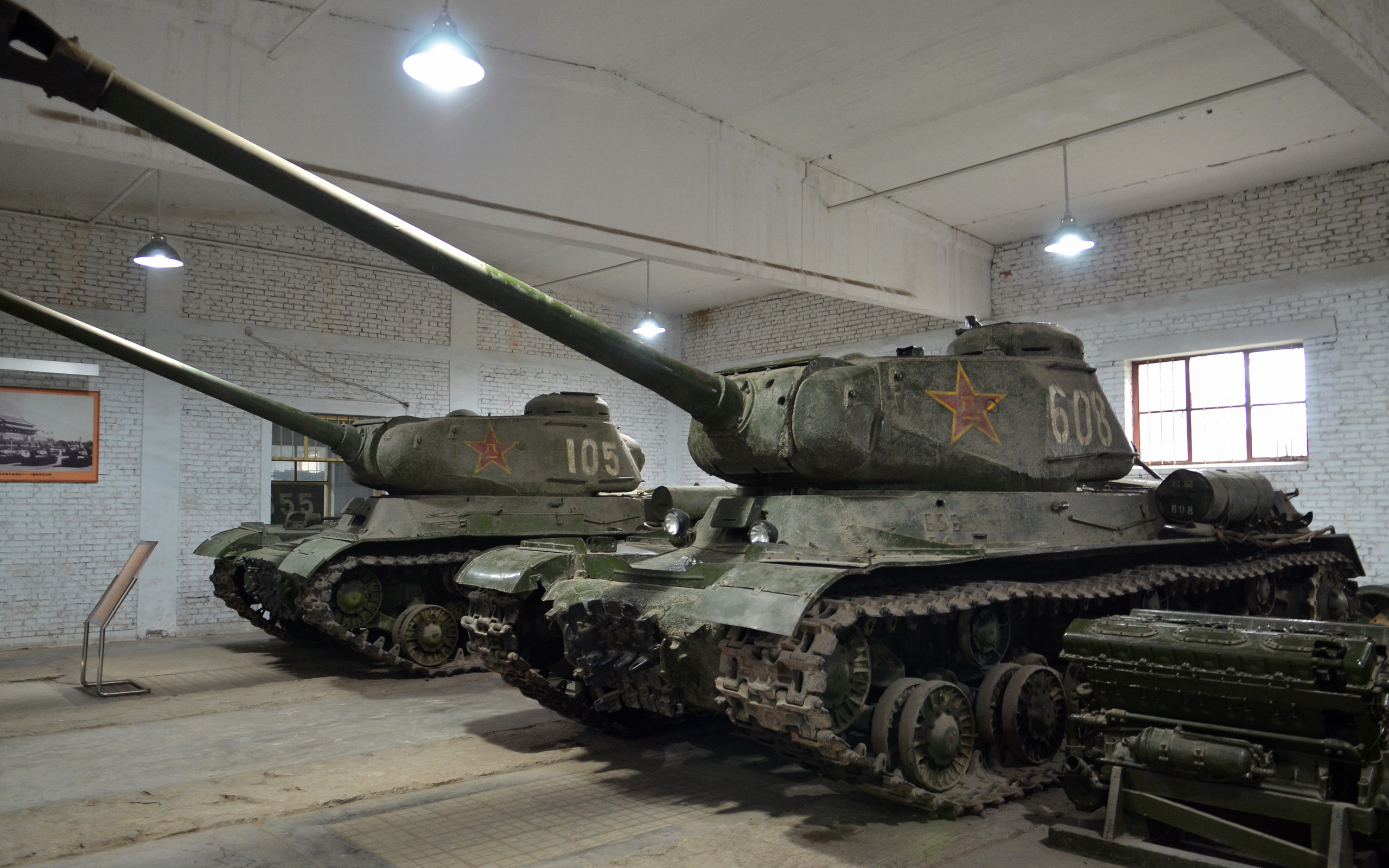
Two IS-2 Mod. 1943s in CPLA tank museum, Beijing

- Tank Museum of the People's Liberation Army, Beijing, China.
- Liberty Park, Overloon, The Netherlands.
- Museum of The History of Ukraine in World War II, Ukraine (five IS-2M, one of them is crudely modified with spare D-10T gun and labeled as IS-1)
- Kurzeme Fortress Museum, Zante, Latvia.
- Diorama Battle of Kursk, in Belgorod, Russia.
- The American Heritage Museum, Stow, Massachusetts, USA
- Army Technical Museum, Lešany, Czech Republic (previously in Prague as a Monument to Soviet tank crews)
- Siekierki War Memorial, Siekierki, West Pomerania, Poland
- Parola Tank Museum

IS-2M

- Imperial War Museum Duxford, England.
- Kubinka Tank Museum, Russia.
- Victory Park at Poklonnaya Gora, Moscow, Russia.

The following document lists 156 surviving IS-2 tanks, some of which are only partially surviving (only gun/turret/hull survives).

== Sources ==
- Higgins, David (2011). Kingtiger vs. IS-2: Operation Solstice 1945. Duel. Osprey Publishing. ISBN 978-1-84908-405-5.
- Jentz, Thomas (1995). Germany's Panther Tank: The Quest for Combat Supremacy. Atglen, PA: Schiffer Publishing. ISBN 0-88740-812-5.
- Jentz, Thomas; Doyle, Hillary (1993). Tiger 1 Heavy Tank 1942–45. New Vanguard 5. illustrated by Sarson, Peter. Osprey. ISBN 978-1-85532-337-7.
- Perrett, Bryan (1987). Soviet Armour Since 1945. London: Blandford Press. ISBN 0-7137-1735-1.
- Samsonov, Peter (2022). IS-2: Development, Design and Production of Stalin's War Hammer. London: Military History Group. ISBN 978-1-915453-10-5.
- Wilbeck, Christopher W. (2004). Sledgehammers: Strengths and Flaws of Tiger Tank Battalions in World War II. Aberjona.
- Zaloga, Steven (1994). IS-2 Heavy Tank 1944-1973. New Vanguard 7. Osprey Publishing. ISBN 978-1-85532-396-4.
- Zaloga, Steven (1995). KV-1 & 2 Heavy Tanks 1939–1945. New Vanguard 17. Osprey Publishing. ISBN 978-1-85532-496-1.
- Zaloga, Steven; Grandsen, James (1984). Soviet Tanks and Combat Vehicles of World War Two. London: Arms and Armour Press. ISBN 0-85368-606-8.
