= Cedynia =

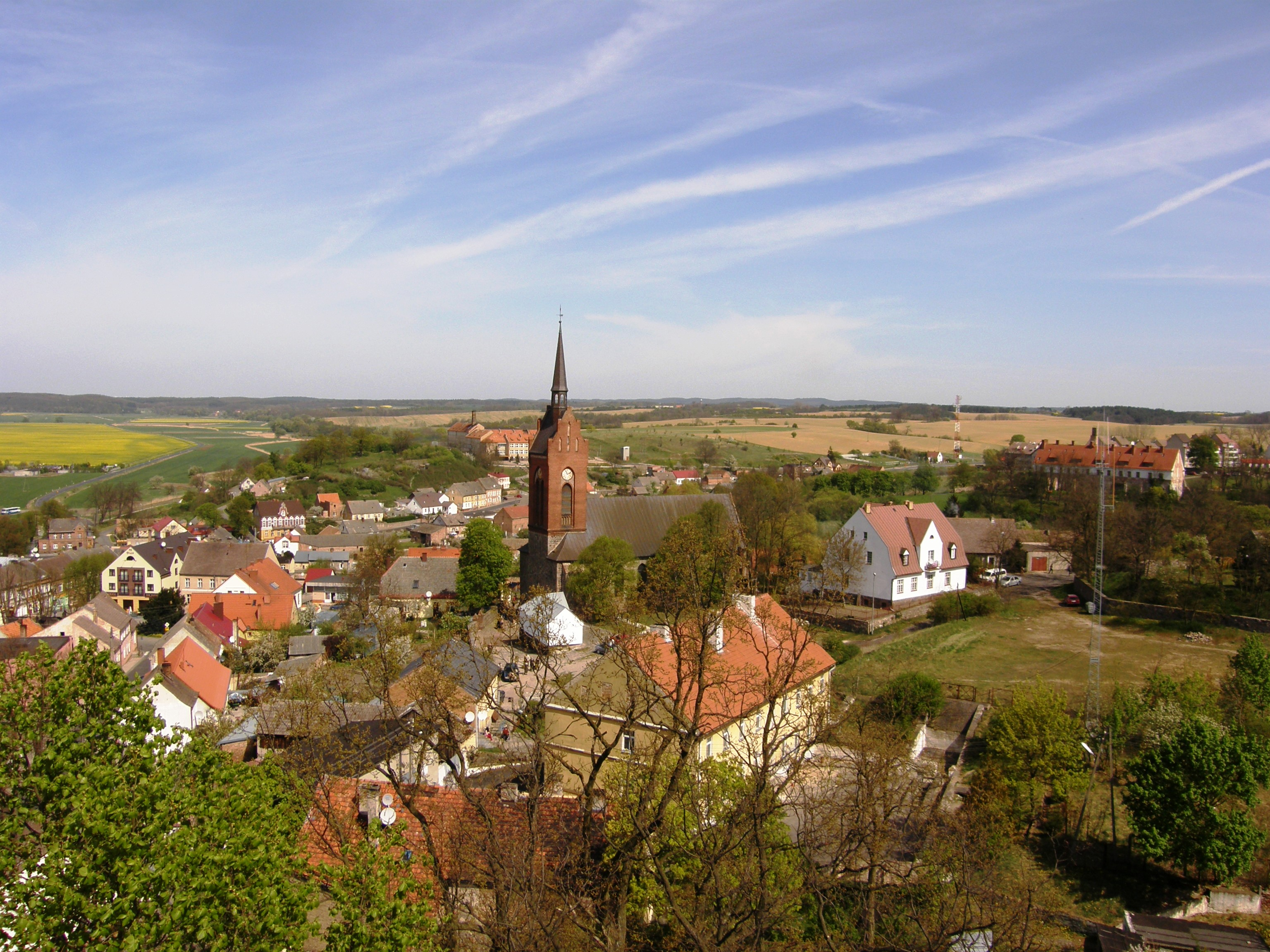

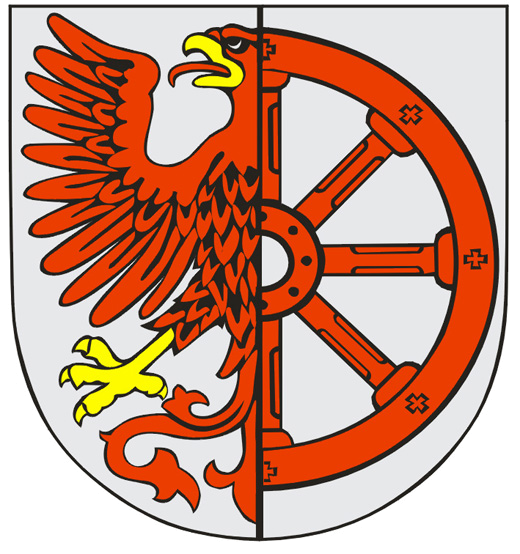
- Coat of arms

- Location within Poland
- Coordinates: 52°53′N 14°12′E
- Country: Poland
- Voivodeship: West Pomeranian
- County: Gryfino
- Gmina: Cedynia
- Established: 9th century
- Town rights: 1299

Government
  - Mayor: Adam Andrzej Zarzycki

Area
  - Total: 1.67 km^{2} (0.64 sq mi)

Population (31 December 2021)
  - Total: 1,484
  - Density: 889/km^{2} (2,300/sq mi)
- Time zone: UTC+1 (CET)
  - Summer (DST): UTC+2 (CEST)
- Postal code: 74-520
- Area code: +48 91
- Car plates: ZGR
- Website: http://www.cedynia.pl

Cedynia ([t͡sɛˈdɨɲa]; German: Zehden, Latin: Cedene) is a historic town in Poland, and the administrative seat of Gmina Cedynia in Gryfino County, West Pomeranian Voivodeship. It is situated close to the Oder river and the border with Germany. The town is known for the 972 Battle of Cedynia, the first historically recorded battle of Poland.

== Geography ==
Cedynia lies in an area that formed part of historic regions of Pomerania and Greater Poland, before later being part of Neumark. It is situated close to the Oder river, which forms the Germany–Poland border; it thereby is the westernmost town in Poland (neighbouring Osinów Dolny lies 6 kilometres (3.7 mi) even further to the west, right on the German border, but is classified as a village). A road border crossing leads to the German town of Bad Freienwalde in the southwest.

The town gives its name to an extended protected area known as Cedynia Landscape Park.

== Demographics ==
=== Number of inhabitants by year ===
Year	Population	Source
1995	1653 ▲	
2000	1687 ▲	
2005	1659 ▼	
2010	1734 ▲	
2015	1649 ▼	
2020	1497 ▼	
2021	1484 ▼	

== History ==
Largely depopulated during the Migration Period, the first Slavic settlement came into existence in the 8th century, when a gród fortification was erected in the area. Around 967, it became part of the emerging Polish state. According to the Cedynia website, the "Name of city appears in documents under oldest written records already in the year 972 as Cidini, in 1187 as Zedin and Cedene, in 1240 as Ceden. "

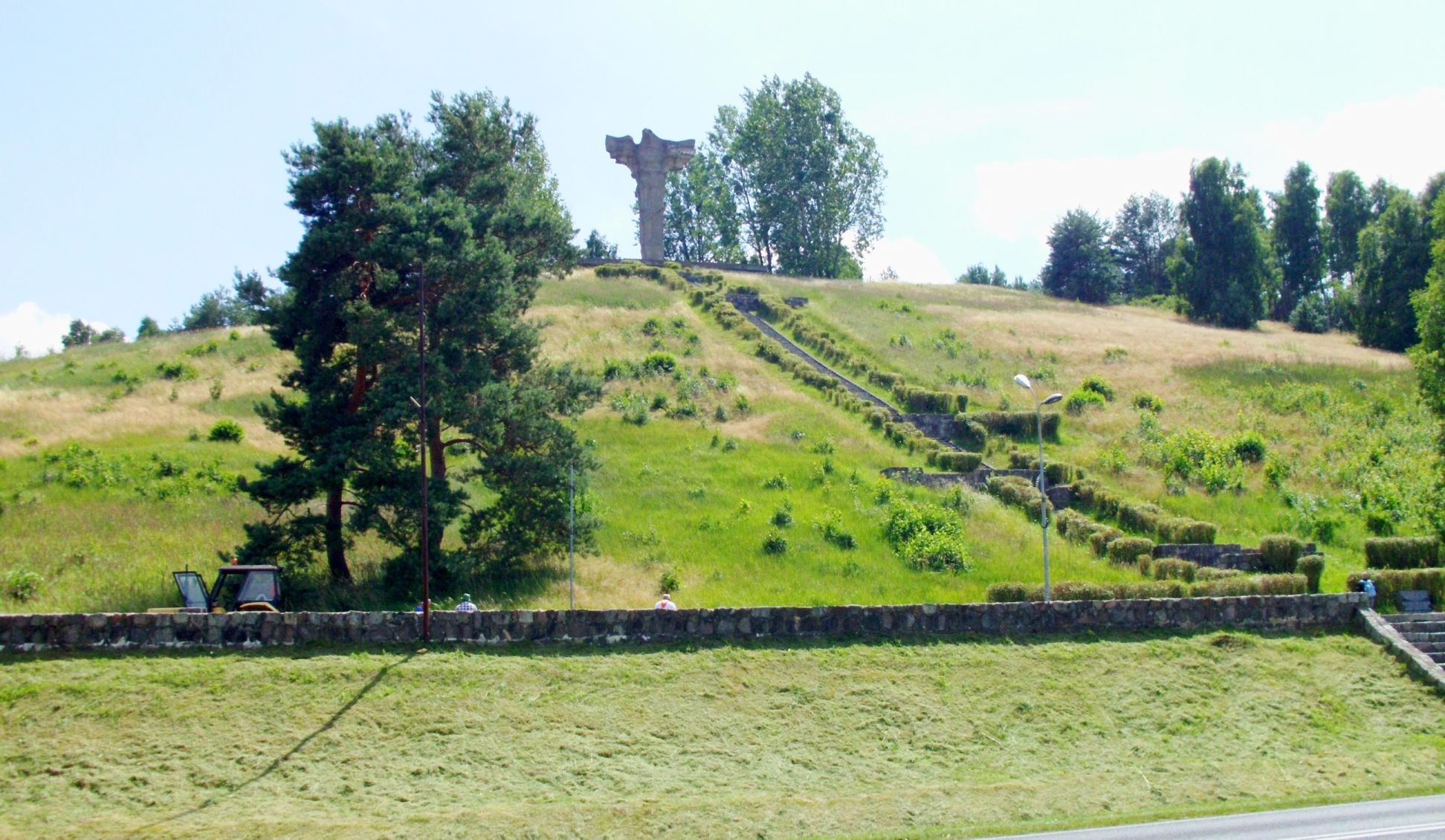
Monument of the Battle of Cedynia

On 24 June 972, the first historically recorded battle of the Polan dukes, the Battle of Cedynia, took place at this location: the Piast duke Mieszko I of Poland and his brother Czcibor defeated the invading forces of the Saxon count Odo I, who then ruled as a margrave in the Saxon Eastern March (Lusatia). Information about this battle is found both in the chronicles by Thietmar of Merseburg and in the Gesta principum Polonorum by Gallus Anonymus. After Emperor Otto II intervened, a peace was reached at the Imperial Diet in Quedlinburg the next year.

Under Mieszko's son Bolesław the name Poland was used for the first time. The Battle of Cedynia was the first of Mieszko and Bolesław's numerous battles that they took up in their conquest attempts in the Polabian border territories soon after they received positions as dukes, mainly in the German–Polish War that lasted from 1002 until the 1018 Peace of Bautzen. Following the death of Bolesław III Wrymouth and the fragmentation of Poland, Cedynia was part of the Duchy of Greater Poland. Together with Santok and Drezdenko, it remained the seat of a (Greater) Polish castellany on the Pomeranian border in the 12th and 13th centuries.

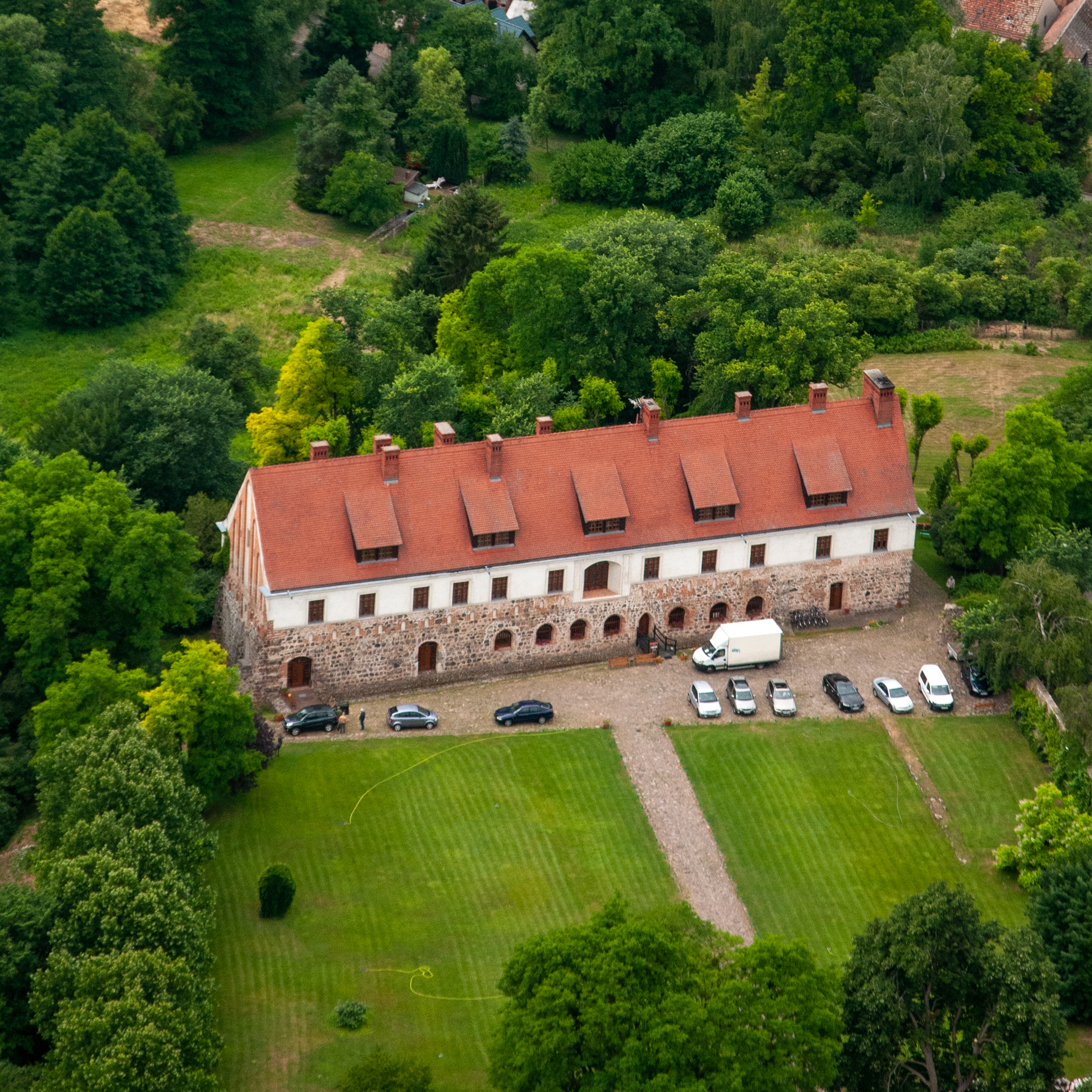
Old Cistercian monastery

With adjacent Lubusz Land in the south, the town became a part of the Neumark acquisitions of the Ascanian margraves John I and of Otto III of Brandenburg in 1248/52. In 1278 the Cistercians from nearby Chorin Abbey erected a nunnery there, which was secularised in 1555 and finally dissolved in 1611, after the Reformation. In 1373 the town became part of the Lands of the Bohemian (Czech) Crown, ruled by the Luxembourg dynasty. In 1402, the Luxembourgs reached an agreement with Poland, upon which Poland was to buy and re-incorporate the region, but eventually the Luxembourgs sold it to the Teutonic Order. In 1454 the Teutonic Knights sold the town to the Margraviate of Brandenburg in order to raise funds for war with Poland.

During the Thirty Years' War the town was destroyed by Swedes, whose King Gustavus Adolphus took quarter in the former nunnery. Town and nunnery were badly destroyed in subsequent battles. In 1641 the Hohenzollern elector Frederick William of Brandenburg had the western wing of the nunnery's ruin rebuilt as a Baroque hunting lodge.

In 1701 the town, with all of Brandenburg, became a part of the Kingdom of Prussia. In 1815 Zehden became part of the Königsberg district within the Brandenburgian Frankfurt Region. In 1871, with all of Prussia, the town became part of the German Empire.

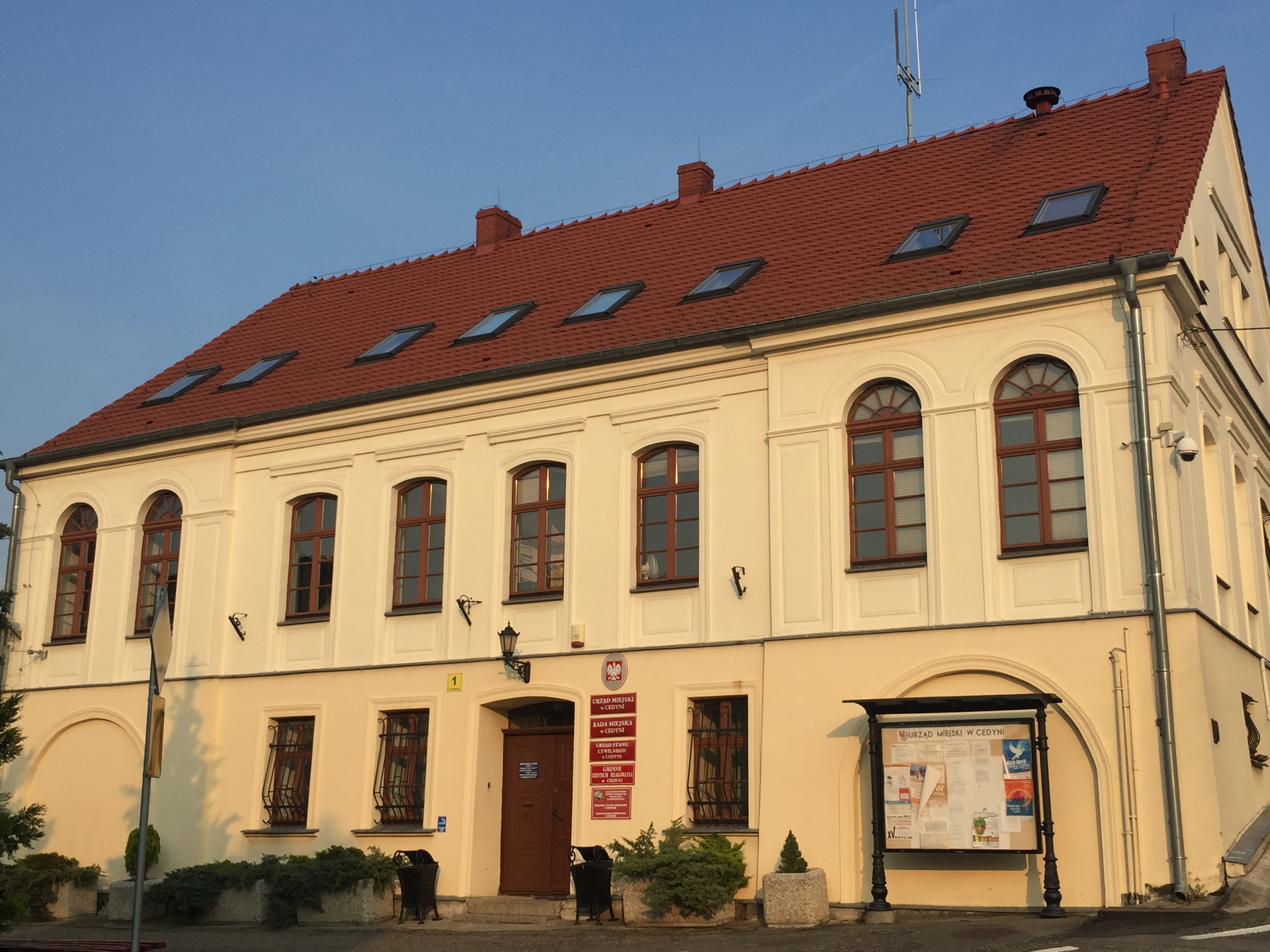
Town hall

In the last weeks of World War II, in March 1945, the town was conquered by joint Soviet and Polish forces during the Vistula-Oder offensive. After the war, the town was handed over to the Republic of Poland according to the 1945 Potsdam Agreement and the remaining German population was expelled, also in accordance with the Potsdam Agreement. The town was repopulated by Poles, often displaced from former eastern Poland annexed by the Soviet Union. A monument to the 972 Battle of Cedynia was erected in the town on the occasion of the millennial anniversary in 1972.

== Culture ==
A local museum (Muzeum Regionalne w Cedyni) is located in central Cedynia.

== Cuisine ==
The officially protected traditional foods and beverages of Cedynia and its surroundings are the Cedynia acacia honey (akacjowy miód cedyński), and two types of local Polish mead: trójniak cedyński and trójniak Czcibor (as designated by the Ministry of Agriculture and Rural Development of Poland).

== Sports ==
The local football team is Czcibor Cedynia. It competes in the lower leagues.
