= ISU-152 =

Soviet heavy assault gun

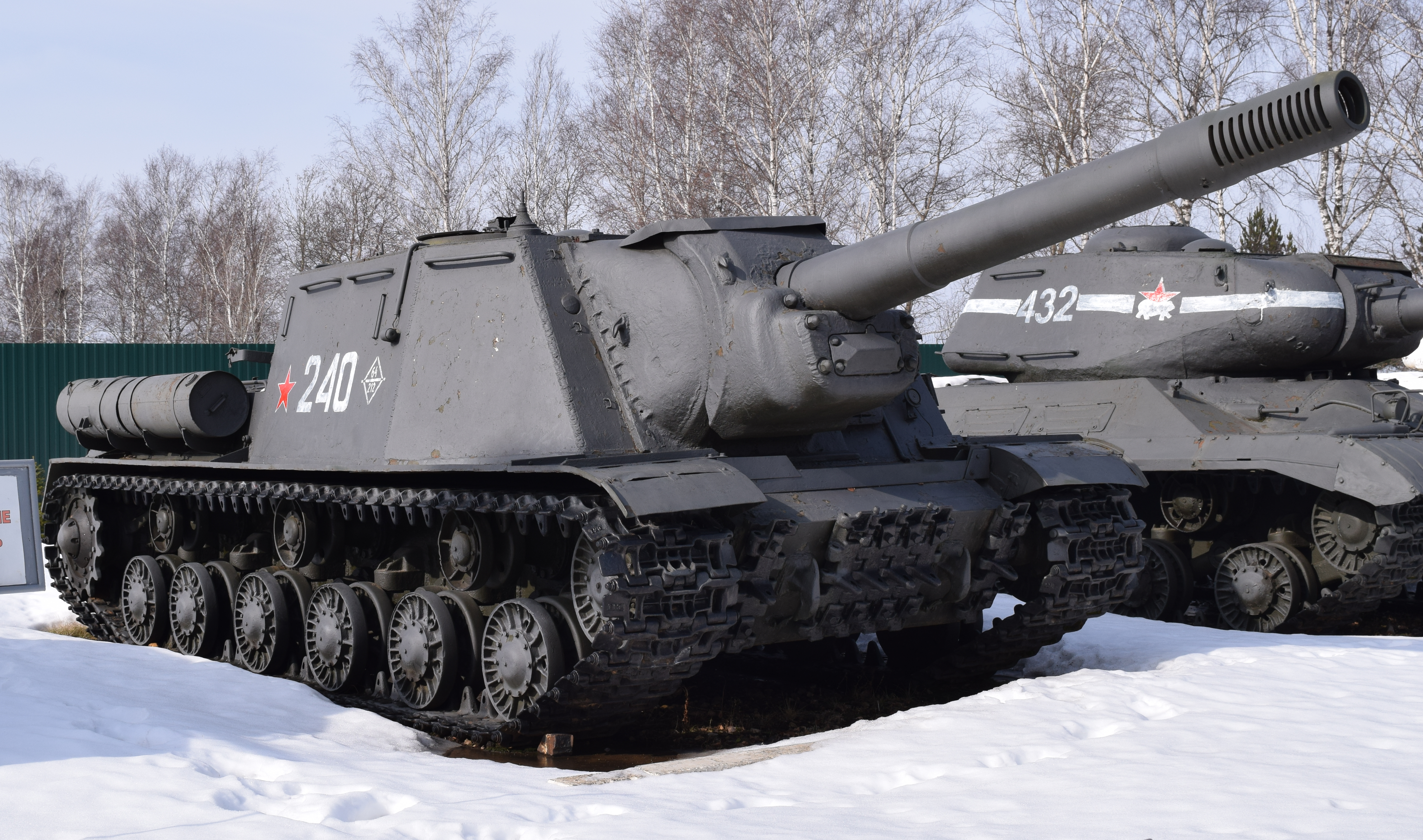
- ISU-152, Kubinka Tank Museum
- Type: Heavy assault gun
- Place of origin: Soviet Union

Service history
- In service: 1943–1980s (USSR)
- Used by: Soviet Union; Finland; Poland; China; Czechoslovakia; North Korea; Egypt; Romania
- Wars: World War II; Korean War; Hungarian Revolution; Egyptian–Israeli Wars; Iran–Iraq War

Production history
- Designer: Design Bureau of Factory No. 100
- Designed: 1943
- Manufacturer: Chelyabinsk Kirovsk Plant (till 1946, also ISU-152M); Leningrad Kirov Plant (few units in 1945, also ISU-152K)
- Produced: 1943–1959
- No. built: 4,635
- Variants: ISU-152 (ML-20); ISU-152-2 (BL-10); ISU-152 model 1945; ISU-152K (ML-20); ISU-152M (ML-20)

Specifications
- Mass: 47.3 t (46.6 long tons; 52.1 short tons) maximum
- Length: 9.18 m (30 ft 1 in)
- Width: 3.07 m (10 ft 1 in)
- Height: 2.48 m (8 ft 2 in)
- Crew: 4 or 5
- Armour: ISU-152, ISU-152-2: 120 mm (mantlet (maximum)); 90 mm (lower hull front, lower hull side and superstructure front); 75 mm (upper hull side); 60 mm (upper hull front); ISU-152 model 1945: 320 mm (in the area of the gun)
- Main armament: 152.4 mm ML-20S gun-howitzer (18 rounds) (ISU-152); 152.4 mm BL-8 or BL-10 gun (21 rounds) (ISU-152-2); 152.4 mm ML-20SM model 1944 gun-howitzer (20 rounds) (ISU-152 model 1945)
- Secondary armament: ISU-152, ISU-152-2, ISU-152K: 12.7×108 mm DShK anti-aircraft machine gun (200 rounds) (ISU-152, ISU-152-2) (300 rounds) (ISU-152K); ISU-152M: 12.7mm DshKM anti-aircraft machine gun (300 rounds); ISU-152 model 1945: 12.7×108 mm DShK anti-aircraft machine gun (300 rounds); 12.7×108 mm DShK co-axial machine gun
- Engine: 12-cyl. V-2IS diesel engine (Note: a 520 hp (382 kW) was used in the ISU-152K); 520 hp (382 kW)
- Power/weight: 11 hp/tonne
- Transmission: mechanical
- Suspension: torsion bar
- Ground clearance: 470 mm (1 ft 7 in) (ISU-152); 450 mm (1 ft 6 in) (ISU-152 model 1945)
- Fuel capacity: 560 litres (maximum, internal fuel tanks); 920 litres (ISU-152K, ISU-152M, internal fuel tanks); 360 litres (maximum, four external fuel tanks, not connected to the supply system)
- Operational range: 120 km (cross terrain, with the internal fuel tanks); 200 km (on road, maximum with the internal fuel tanks); 260 km (on road, with two external fuel tanks); 320 km (on road, with four external fuel tanks); 320 km (ISU-152K, ISU-152M, on road, with the internal fuel tanks)
- Maximum speed: 30 km/h (19 mph) on road; 15-20 km/h (cross terrain); 40 km/h (ISU-152 model 1945, ISU-152K, ISU-152M, on road)

The ISU-152 (Russian: Самоходная установка на базе танка ИС с орудием калибра 152мм, ИСУ-152, romanized: Samokhodnaya Ustanovka na baze tanka IS s orudiyem kalibra 152mm, meaning "IS tank based self-propelled installation with 152mm caliber gun") is a Soviet self-propelled gun developed and used during World War II. It was unofficially nicknamed Zveroboy (Russian: Зверобой; "beast killer") in response to several large German tanks and guns coming into service, including Tigers and Panthers. Since the ISU-152's gun was mounted in a casemate, aiming it was awkward, and had to be done by repositioning the entire vehicle using the tracks. Therefore, it was used as mobile artillery to support more mobile infantry and armor attacks. It continued service into the 1970s and was used in several campaigns and countries.

== History ==
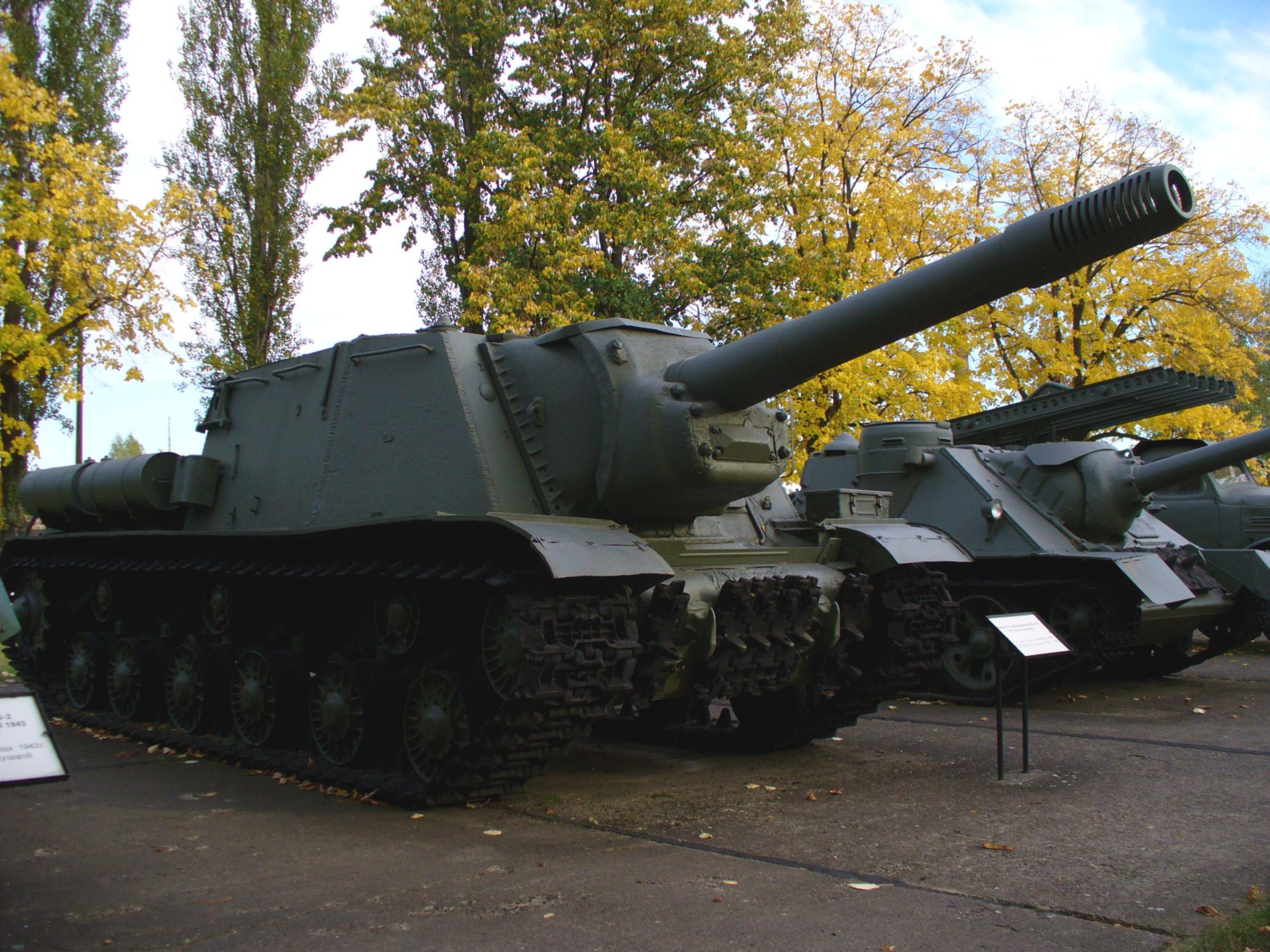
An ISU-152 displayed at Karlshorst, Berlin, Germany.

The beginnings of the ISU-152 came on 24 January 1943, when the first prototype of the SU-152 was unveiled. This was a fully enclosed 152mm gun-howitzer on the KV-1S tank chassis. It was designated Объект 236 ("Object 236") . Object 236 was completed in Factory No. 100 in Chelyabinsk, and was tested successfully from 24 January to 7 February 1943. On 14 February the vehicle was adopted and put into production under the KV-14 (кв-14) designation; in April 1943 the designation was changed to SU-152" (СУ-152).

Although the SU-152 was successful in combat, production of the KV-1S tank chassis was ending, which made the modernisation of the vehicle necessary, using the new IS tank chassis. On 25 May 1943 the administration of Factory No. 100 ordered the modernisation of the SU-152, which included increased armour protection and other improvements. Development began in July 1943, under the supervision of Josef Kotin, the chief designer of Soviet heavy tanks, and G. N. Moskvin as the main designer.

The new design, designated IS-152 (ИС-152), was tested from September to November 1943. Testing revealed a large number of deficiencies, which sent it back for further improvement. On 6 November 1943 an order was issued for adoption of the improved variant, under the ISU-152 (ИСУ-152) designation, and in December production began at the Chelyabinsk Kirovsk Plant, replacing the SU-152.

== Design ==
Positions of crewmembers in the ISU-152: 1. Driver 2. Commander 3. Gunner 4. Breech operator 5. Loader.

On 15 April 1942, at the plenum of the artillery committee, where the development of assault guns for support of the infantry was discussed, the necessity of also developing assault guns capable of destroying fortified positions was acknowledged. It was intended these assault guns would be armed with a 152.4 mm gun-howitzer and used for penetration of the enemy defence in the offensive operations planned for 1942–1943. This resulted in the development of the Object 236, and eventually the SU-152, which concept was later continued and further developed with the ISU-152.

The ISU-152 followed the same design as most other Soviet self-propelled guns. The fully armoured hull was divided into two compartments: fighting compartment for the crew, gun and ammunition in the front of the hull, and engine and transmission in the rear. The gun was mounted slightly to the right of centre with a limited traverse of 12 degrees left and right. The crew consisted of four or five men placed in the superstructure. Three of the crew were to the left of the gun: driver to the front, then gunner and last the loader. The vehicle commander and lockman (who operated the gun breech) were to the right: commander to the front and the lockman behind. When the crew consisted of four men, the loading was carried out by the lockman.

The suspension consisted of twelve torsion bars for the six road wheels on either side. The drive sprockets were at the back, and the front idlers were identical to the road wheels. Each track was made up of 90 links. There were three internal fuel tanks, two in the crew area and one in the engine compartment. These were usually supplemented with four unconnected external fuel tanks. 12- and 24-volt electrical power supplies came from a 1 kW generator feeding four accumulator batteries.

For observation from the interior, all roof hatches had periscopes and there were two gun sights: telescopic ST-10 (СТ-10) and panoramic. For crew communication a TPU-4-BisF intercom was fitted, and for inter-vehicle communication there was a single 10R or 10RK radio. These were better than Soviet equipment at the start of the war but still inferior to German equivalents.

The crew were given two PPSh submachine guns with 1491 rounds and 20 F-1 grenades for short-range self-defence.

The ISU-152 was armed with the same gun as the SU-152, but it used the hull of the IS-1 tank instead of the KV-1S. Later in the war the ISU-152 was further improved. It used the hull of the IS-2 or IS-2 model 1944 tank, the armour of the mantlet was increased, the gun was replaced by newer variants, a 12.7×108 mm DShK anti-aircraft machine gun was installed by the right forward hatch and later its ammunition capacity increased, the 10R radio set was upgraded to a 10RK and the fuel capacity was increased.

Some ISU-152s were equipped with even larger external fuel tanks, two tanks on the rear hull deck, in addition to the four external fuel tanks — 90 litres (20 imp gal; 24 US gal) each, maximum — or with two smaller additional external fuel tanks, on the hull rear. This option was probably available for the post-war ISU-152 variants.

Between December 1943 and May 1945, 1,885 ISU-152s were built. Mass production ceased in 1947, with 3,242 vehicles produced in total.

Post-war ISU-152 modernisation included installation of night vision sights, replacing of the V-2IS engine with the V-54K, the 12.7mm machine gun was replaced by a newer variant, the ammunition capacity increased to 30 rounds, additional armor, automotive improvements and significant increase of the main fuel capacity.

== Variants ==
The initial variant was developed in 1943. The factory designation was Object 241 (Объект 241). It was armed with the 152.4 mm ML-20S (МЛ-20С) model 1937 gun-howitzer, with a barrel length of over 4.2 metres (27.9 calibers). This gun had a maximum range of 6,200 metres (6,780 yd). The armor-piercing round, weighing 48.78 kilograms (107.5 lb), had a muzzle velocity of 600 metres per second (1,969 ft/s) and a maximum penetration of 125 millimetres (4.9 in) of rolled homogeneous armour (RHA) at 90° at a range of 500 metres (547 yd). The rate of fire was 2-3 rounds/min. The ISU-152 carried 21 rounds of two piece (shell and charge) armor-piercing and high explosive ammunition. Later ISU-152 versions had a newer gun with a slightly longer barrel, up to over 4.9 metres (32.3 calibers), with a maximum range of fire of up to 13,000 metres (14,217 yd).

The ISU-152 had different versions, with changes in the gun (later versions), the number of hatches, or the hull (based on the hull of the IS-1, IS-2 or IS-2 model 1944 tanks). The IS-2 based versions had a thicker gun shield and larger fuel tank. Until May 1944, the main armament was the 152.4 mm ML-20 model 1937 gun-howitzer. The ISU-152 had a rate of fire of 2-3 rounds/min. The early versions had three hatches in the superstructure roof and one emergency hatch at the bottom of the hull behind the driver's seat, which had an armored cover. Later versions had a fourth, round hatch in the superstructure roof on the right, next to the rectangular hatch on the left.

=== ISU-152-2 ===
ISU-152BM (ИСУ-152БМ), sometimes referred to as ISU-152BM-1 or ISU-152-1, with the factory designation Object 246 (Объект 246), was a single prototype developed in April 1944 in Factory No. 100 in attempt to increase the firepower of the ISU-152. The "BM" ("БМ") in the designation stands for "High-Powered" ("Большой Мощности"). The main purpose of the ISU-152BM was to fight against heavily armored tank destroyers such as the Elefant and the Jagdtiger. It was armed with the 152.4 mm BL-8 (БЛ-8) long-barreled gun, which unlike the ISU-152's gun was not a gun-howitzer. The gun had a maximum range of 18,500 metres (20,232 yd), with the 43.56-kilogram (96.0 lb) high-explosive shell which had a muzzle velocity of 880 metres per second (2,887 ft/s). The overall length of the gun was over 8 metres (26 ft), with a barrel length of 7,620 millimetres (300 in) (50 calibers). The armor-piercing round, weighing 48.78 kilograms (107.5 lb), had a muzzle velocity of 850 metres per second (2,800 ft/s). During test firing at armour plates with different thicknesses, the ISU-152BM successfully penetrated a maximum of 203 millimetres (8.0 in) of RHA at 90° at ranges of up to 2,000 metres (2,187 yd). However, during trials in July 1944, the gun showed some deficiencies, such as being difficult for the crew to operate, unreliability of the muzzle brake and the breech block, and unsatisfactory performance of the shells. In addition, the gun, protruding far forward of the hull front, limited the maneuverability of the vehicle. The self-propelled gun carried 21 rounds of two-piece (shell and charge) ammunition, and had a rate of fire of 2 rounds per minute. It used the engine, transmission, running gear, and electric equipment of the ISU-122. In August 1944 the BL-8 gun was replaced with the improved 152.4 mm BL-10 (БЛ-10) long-barreled gun, with a slightly shorter barrel of 7.392 metres (24.25 ft) (48.5 calibers). This vehicle gun was designated ISU-152-2 (ИСУ-152-2). The factory designation was Object 247 (Объект 247). It was also equipped with external fuel tanks. The gun had a modified muzzle brake and a semi-automatic breech block. It had a rate of fire of 3 rounds/min. The BL-10 had a maximum range of 18,000 metres (19,685 yd), with the 43.56-kilogram (96.0 lb) high-explosive shell. In December 1944 the ISU-152-2 underwent trials, revealing the barrel strength and the angle of horizontal guidance were unsatisfactory. The gun was sent for further improvement, but it was not completed before the war ended. The vehicle was never adopted. After the war, the final and most improved, third modification of ISU-152-2 was completed. The gun had a maximum range of 19,500 metres (21,325 yd), using a 48.5-kilogram (107 lb) high-explosive shell with a muzzle velocity of 880 metres per second (2,887 ft/s).

=== Object 704 ===
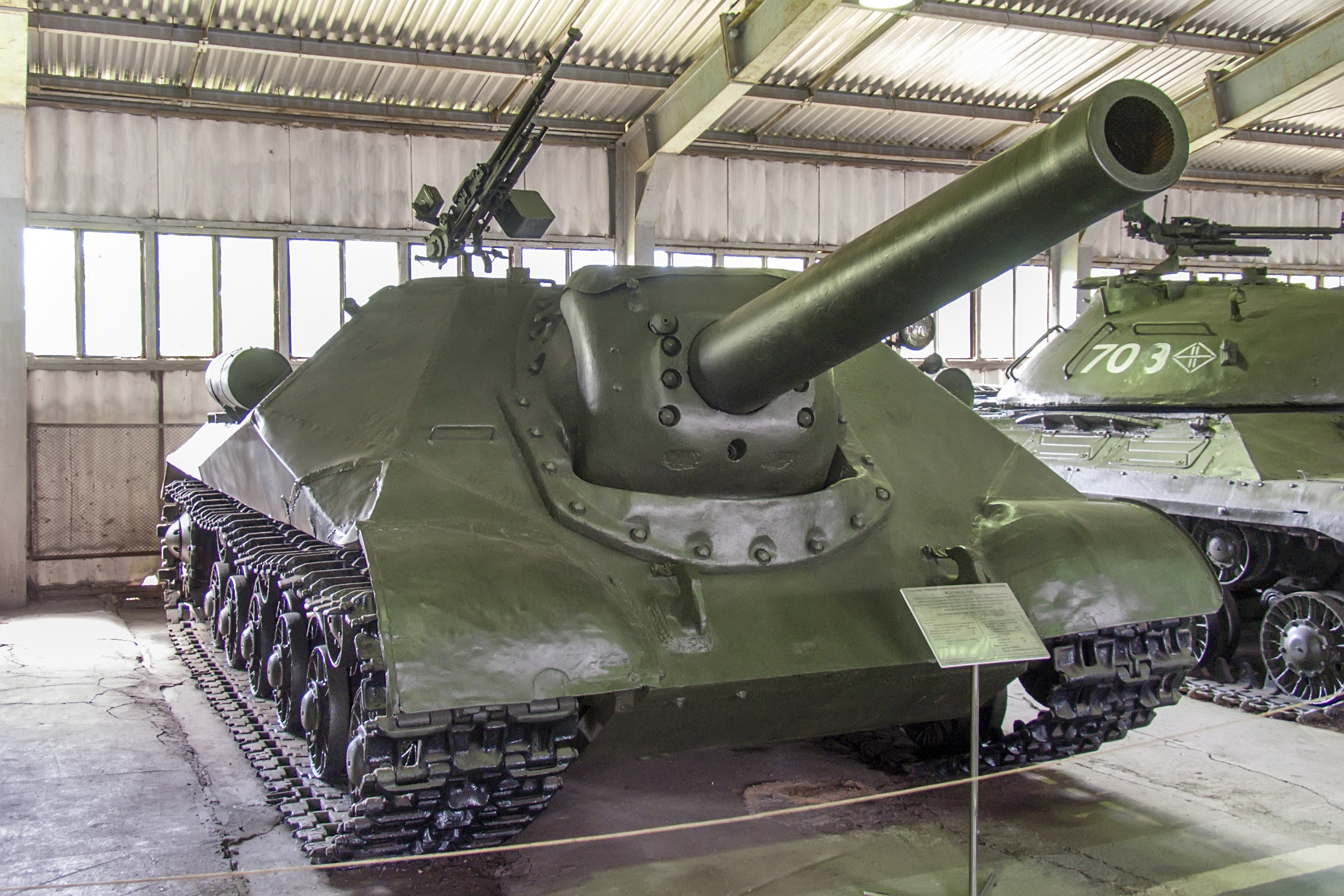
Object 704

Object 704 (Объект 704) was the factory designation for a prototype self propelled gun developed in 1945. Also known as the Kirovets-2, it was developed on the chassis of the Kirovets-1, the initial prototype of the project that became the IS-3. The overall height of the vehicle was reduced to 2,240 millimetres (7.35 ft), which was compensated with an increased width of the superstructure. It was armed with the 152.4 mm ML-20SM model 1944 (МЛ-20СМ обр. 1944 г.) gun-howitzer, with a barrel length of over 4.5 metres (15 ft) (29.6 calibers) and no muzzle brake. It had a maximum range of 13,000 metres (42,651 ft). The self-propelled gun carried 20 rounds of two-piece (shell and charge) armour-piercing and high-explosive ammunition. The armour-piercing round, weighing 48.78 kilograms (107.5 lb), had a muzzle velocity of 655 metres per second (2,149 ft/s). The rate of fire was 1-2 round/min. Object 704 had four hatches at the superstructure roof and one emergency hatch at the bottom of the hull behind the driver's seat, which had an armoured cover. The self-propelled gun carried two external 90-litre (19.8 imp gal; 23.8 US gal) fuel tanks, not connected to the supply system. The secondary armament of the fighting vehicle consisted of two 12.7×108 mm DShK machine guns, one anti-aircraft and one co-axial. The protection was increased by placing thicker armour at more radical angles. In the area of the gun, where the mantlet combined with the hull front behind it and the housing of the recoil mechanism, the armour thickness was 320 millimetres (13 in). Object 704 was the best protected of all experimental or production Soviet self-propelled guns of the Second World War. However, the radical incline of the superstructure walls combined with the increased recoil of the gun, due to the lack of a muzzle brake, significantly complicated the work of the crew, and for this reason it was not adopted.

=== ISU-152K ===
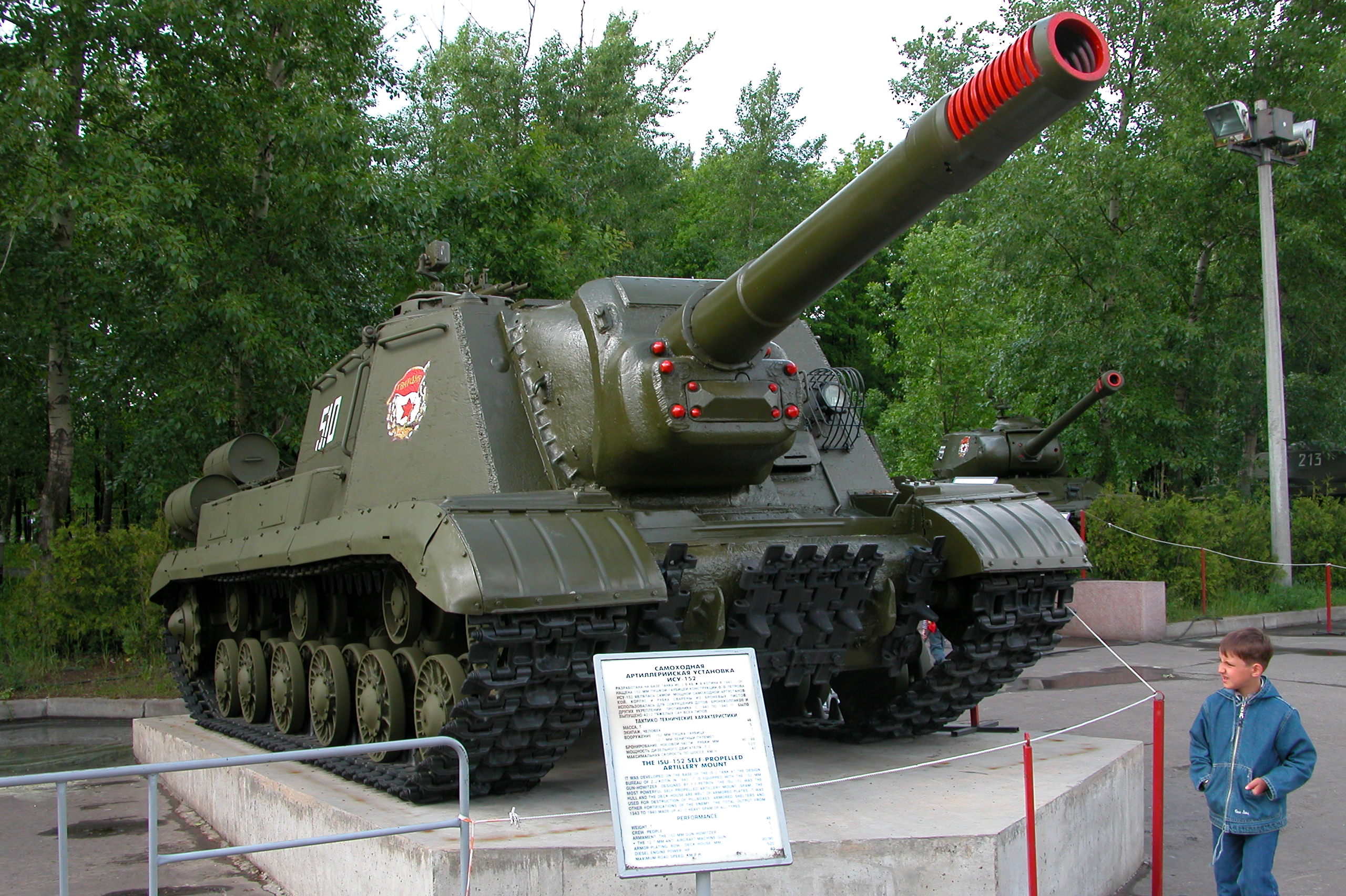
ISU-152K, Victory Park, Moscow, Russia.

Object 241K (Объект 241К) was the factory designation for a modernised variant of the wartime ISU-152, developed in 1956. It used a new engine, that of the T-54, with a cooling system and a heater. The capacity of the main internal fuel tank was increased to 920 litres (202 imp gal; 243 US gal), which added 500 kilometres (311 mi) more to the vehicle's range on a road. The ammunition capacity was increased to 30 rounds after the removal of an additional internal fuel tank placed in the crew compartment. The gun had a maximum range of 13,000 metres (14,217 yd). It received a new commander's cupola, and also new sights. The running gear used many elements of the T-10. The mantlet had additional armor ring protecting the sight. Some of the ISU-152Ks received an additional 15 mm armour plate welded on top of the 60 mm armour plate covering the mantlet above. Also, some of them received an additional armour plate welded on the upper mantlet front. The modernisation was carried out in the Leningrad Kirov Plant.

=== ISU-152M ===
ISU-152M was the final variant of ISU-152, developed in 1959. The work was now transferred to the Chelyabinsk Kirovsk Plant. This modernisation was parallel to the IS-2M program and the ISU-152M used many elements of the tank. The factory designation was Object 241M (Объект 241М). The innovations included night vision sights, increased ammunition stowage for the 12.7 mm machine gun, which was replaced by the improved DShKM, and internal automotive improvements. It had the same new commander's cupola and sights as the ISU-152K. It also had the same main internal fuel tank capacity, 920 litres (202 imp gal; 243 US gal), adding 500 kilometres (311 mi) more to the vehicle's range on a road compared to the ISU-152, and an increased ammunition capacity to 30 rounds due to the removal of an internal fuel tank. The gun had a maximum range of 13,000 metres (14,217 yd). The ring protecting the sight was present, and the armour of the upper mantlet front was further increased with a thicker additional armour plate. The ISU-152M had the same V-54K engine with a heater, but lacked the cooling system.

== Use ==
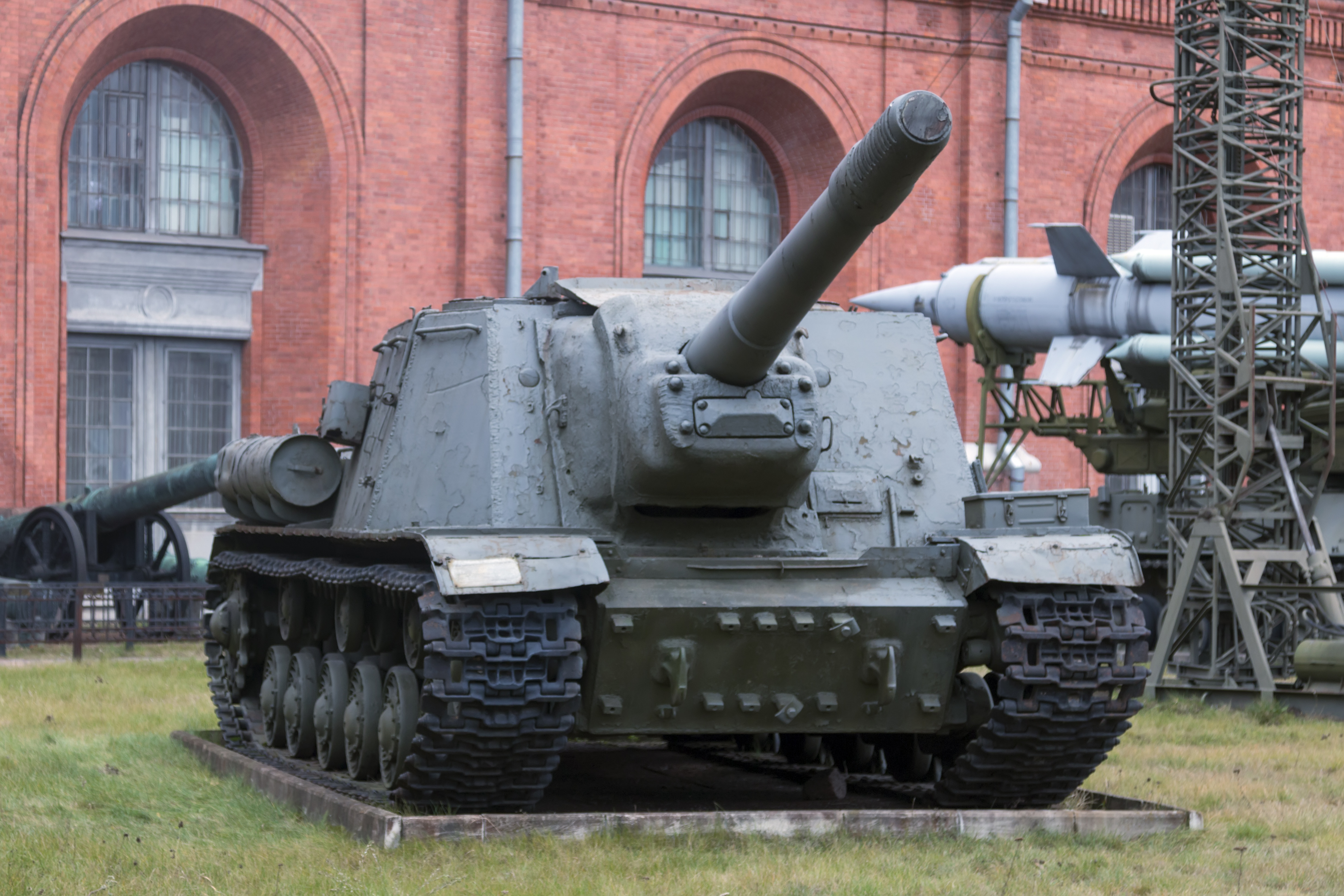

The ISU-152 self-propelled gun combined three battle roles: heavy assault gun, heavy tank destroyer and heavy self-propelled artillery. The 152.4 mm gun used a number of powerful (shell and charge) ammunition types. These types included a 43.56 kg high-explosive shell, a 48.78 kg armour-piercing shell, and the heaviest of all, the 53-G-545 (53-Г-545) long-range concrete-piercing 56 kg shell. The ISU-152 was used for infantry and tank support in attacking fortified enemy positions in a direct-fire role, for artillery support on the battlefield in an indirect-fire role, and for engagement against armored vehicles in a direct-fire role. The ISU-152 was also used by Liquidators during cleanup after the Chernobyl Disaster for demolition.

=== Heavy assault gun ===
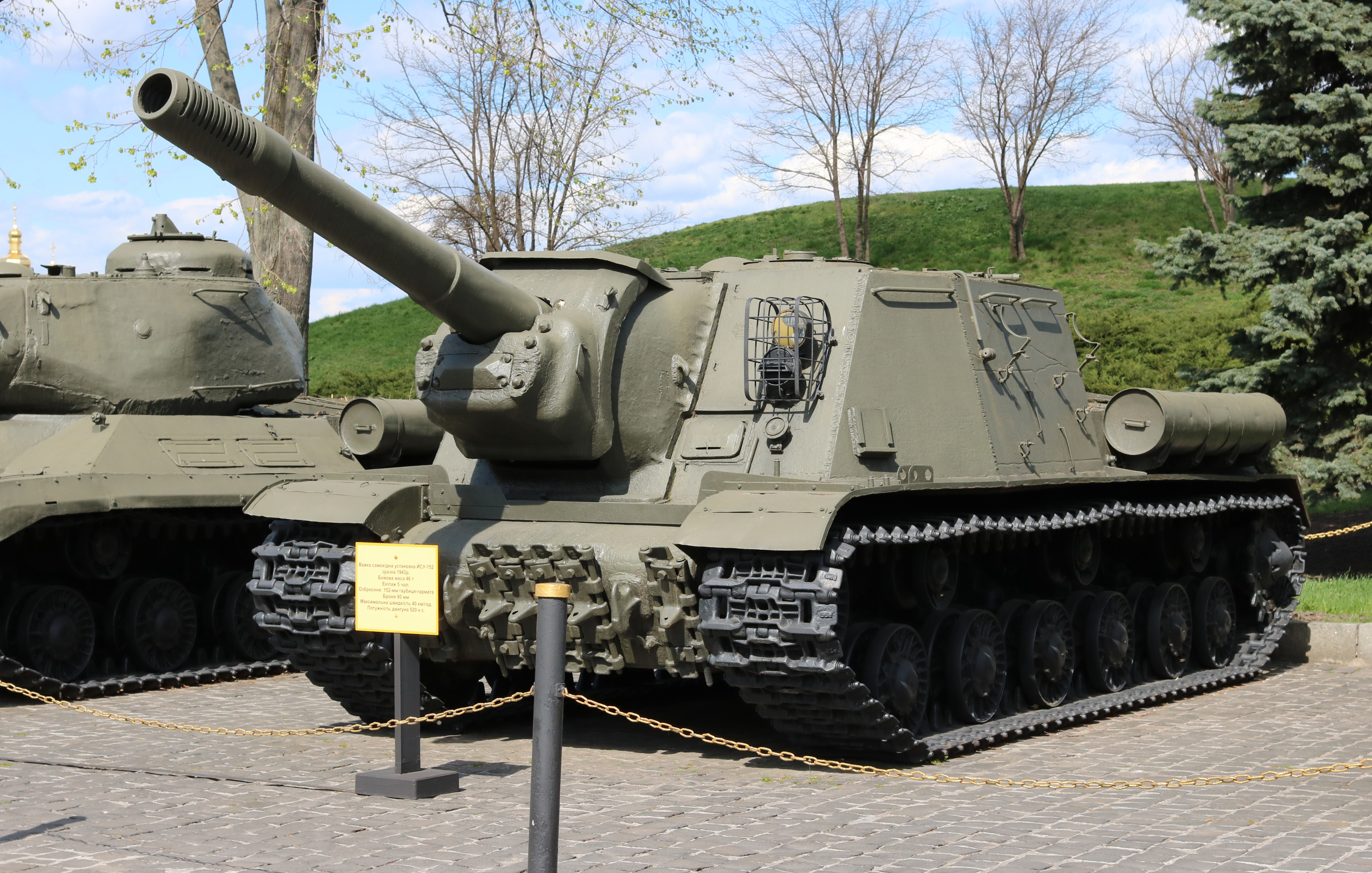

As a heavy assault gun, the ISU-152 was an extremely valuable weapon in urban combat operations such as the Berlin, Budapest, and Königsberg. The vehicle's excellent armour was good protection against most German anti-tank guns, allowing it to advance into the face of direct anti-tank fire, while the huge, low velocity, high-explosive rounds were excellent at blasting open even the most heavily fortified and reinforced enemy strongpoints. Such actions would be much more dangerous and much less effective for a conventional towed artillery piece, with their high crew exposure and low mobility, or even a tank, with their smaller main guns. When supporting tanks, the usual position for the ISU-152 was in the second line of the attack order, 100 to 200 metres (110 to 220 yd) behind the attacking tanks, which were usually IS-2 tanks with equal mobility.

The ISU-152, like the earlier SU-152 and contemporary ISU-122, was employed by Independent Heavy Self-propelled Artillery Regiments. Between May 1943 and 1945, 53 of these regiments were formed. Many of them were re-formed tank regiments, and employed similar direct fire tactics as used by tanks when supporting infantry. Each of the heavy regiment had 21 guns, divided into four artillery batteries of five vehicles and the commander's vehicle. For support, these heavy regiments had some supplementary unarmoured vehicles such as trucks, jeeps, or motorcycles. In December 1944, Guards Heavy Self-propelled Artillery Brigades were formed, to provide heavy fire support to the tank armies. They were organized along the model of tank brigades, each with 65 ISU-152 or ISU-122 self-propelled guns.

To minimize the risks of being knocked out by Panzerfaust-equipped units during urban operations, the ISU-152 usually acted in one- or two-vehicle detachments alongside infantry squads for protection. The infantry squad would include a specialist sniper (or at least a sharpshooter), some submachine gunners, and sometimes a flamethrower. The ISU-152's heavy-calibre DShK machine gun was also useful for targeting Panzerfaust gunners hiding on upper floors of city buildings or behind protective cover and defensive barricades. Effective teamwork between the ISU-152 crew and supporting infantry allowed them to achieve their goals with minimal losses, but if such tactics were not adhered to, the attacking vehicles were easily attacked and destroyed, usually through the weaker armor on the roof or rear compartment.

=== Heavy tank destroyer ===
The ISU-152 could also operate as an effective heavy tank destroyer. Though it was not designed for the role, the vehicle inherited the nickname Zveroboy ("beast killer") from its predecessor, the SU-152, for its ability to reliably kill the best protected German fighting vehicles: the Panther tank, the Tiger I and Tiger II tanks, and even the rare Elefant and Jagdtiger tank destroyers. The sheer weight of the 152.4 mm shells resulted in an extremely low rate of fire, only two to three rounds per minute, and less accuracy at long range than high-velocity tank and anti-tank guns. However, the massive blast effect from the heavy high-explosive warhead was capable of blowing the turret completely off a Tiger tank. A direct hit usually destroyed or damaged the target's tracks and suspension, immobilizing it. While the low-velocity 152mm high-explosive shell did not generally penetrate heavy armor, it frequently killed or severely wounded the crew through spalling (splintering) inside the hull as well as injuries caused by blast concussion. Due to the brittle nature of German tank steel during the latter stages of the war, it was common for impacted armor plates to shatter from the concussive blast, or for weld lines to break, allowing the entire armor piece to fall away. Surviving crew were often left with an immobilized vehicle which had to be hurriedly abandoned before being destroyed.

For anti-tank operations following the July 1943 Battle of Kursk, armour-piercing ammunition was developed, with an eye towards giving the howitzer a more traditional anti-tank capability. However, these rounds were expensive, in short supply, and only moderately more effective than the standard non-penetrating high-explosive round. As a howitzer, the ML-20S exchanged velocity and accuracy for throw weight and distance, and was not intended to compete with true anti-tank guns. Sometimes the concrete-piercing ammunition was used for the anti-tank role. A primitive shaped charge munition, with a 27.44-kilogram (60.49 lb) shell, was also developed. It had a maximum penetration of 250 mm of RHA at 90°, but it was not used during the war.

The ISU-152's 90 mm of sloped frontal armor, in contrast to the SU-152's 65 mm, provided excellent frontal protection from the 75mm KwK 40 guns of the ubiquitous Panzer IV and StuG family at most ranges, with the exception of close-range, while also forcing the original Tiger I, with its vaunted 88 mm KwK 36 gun, to close to medium ranges to penetrate the ISU-152, negating its traditional long-range superiority and putting it within effective range of Soviet T-34-85 medium tanks.

The ISU-152 was not a true purpose-built tank destroyer. It had a very low rate of fire compared with specialised tank destroyers such as the German Jagdpanther or the Soviet SU-100, which could manage a brief burst of five to eight rounds per minute. However, prior to the introduction of the SU-100 it was the only Soviet armored vehicle capable of tackling the German heavy tanks with any kind of reliability, and its ability to satisfy multiple roles meant it was produced in far greater numbers than the SU-100. Attention to camouflage, quick relocation between firing positions, and massed ambushes of four or five vehicles firing in salvo at a single target's flanks reduced the disadvantage of the low rate of fire.

=== Self-propelled artillery ===
The ISU-152 was also sometimes used as self-propelled artillery for support on the battlefield and preparatory bombardments, though it had a medium range of fire and a slow speed of reloading. The Soviet army had not developed specialized vehicles for this purpose. Their tank and mechanized units were well equipped with towed artillery, but towed guns were very vulnerable while moving and could not support tanks and motorized infantry during rapid advances into enemy positions, unlike fully enclosed armored vehicles like the ISU-152.

The internal stowage was limited to only 20 or 21 rounds of ammunition, with extra rounds often stowed on the rear deck. Replenishing the vehicle's ammunition supply took over 40 minutes and required a very strong loader, due to the large size and weight of the shells - over 40 kg (88 lb). The ST-10 telescopic sight used for direct fire was graduated up to 900 m (3,000 ft). A second panoramic sight was used for direct fire up to 3,500 m (3,800 yd) range no direct fire. However, it was problematic for the gunner to switch between the two. To compensate, it was simpler to concentrate the fire of several vehicles onto the target, sacrificing accuracy for volume of firepower. The high-explosive shells were large enough to take out even a heavily armoured vehicle, or a fortification with the even heavier long-range concrete-piercing shells. The usual complement of ammunition was 13 high-explosive and 7 armour-piercing or concrete-piercing.

Ammunition	Ammunition type	Shell type	Shell weight	Penetration (maximum)	1,000 meters	1,500 meters	2,000 meters
53-OF-540	Long-range high-explosive	gun steel shell	43.56 kg (96.0 lb)				
53-OF-530	Long-range high-explosive	howitzer steel shell	40 kg				
53-BR-540	Armor-piercing	pointed nose shell (without a ballistic cap)	48.78 kg	125 mm of RHA at 90° (at 500 meters)	115 mm (123 mm)	105 mm	90 mm
53-BR-540B (adopted in late 1944)	Armor-piercing	flat nose shell (with a ballistic cap)	46.5 kg	130 mm of RHA at 90° (at 500 meters)	120 mm	115 mm	105 mm
53-BP-540 (not used during World War II)	Armor-piercing	shaped charge	27.44 kg	250 mm of RHA at 90° (220 mm at 30° from vertical) (120 mm at 60° from vertical)			
Naval, model 1915/1928	Semi-armor-piercing		51.07 kg	136 mm of RHA at 90° (at 100 meters) (128 mm at 500 meters)	119 mm	111 mm	105 mm
53-G-530	Long-range concrete-piercing	howitzer shell	40 kg	about 1 meter of reinforced concrete			
53-G-545	Long-range concrete-piercing	gun shell	56 kg				

The armor penetration can vary between ammunition batches and different rolled homogeneous armour.

== Soviet military service ==
- World War II
  - Eastern Front
  - Continuation War
  - Soviet–Japanese War
    - Manchurian Invasion
- Hungarian Revolution

== Foreign military service ==
=== Finland ===
In June 1944, during the Continuation War, a captured ISU-152 was used by the Finnish military. It was abandoned during the counter-attack at Kärstilänjärvi after receiving numerous shots from Soviet T-34-85 medium tanks. This was a direct result of the Finnish crew's lack of experience and training with the ISU-152. Another captured one was repaired in Varkaus, Finland, but never saw combat.

=== Poland ===
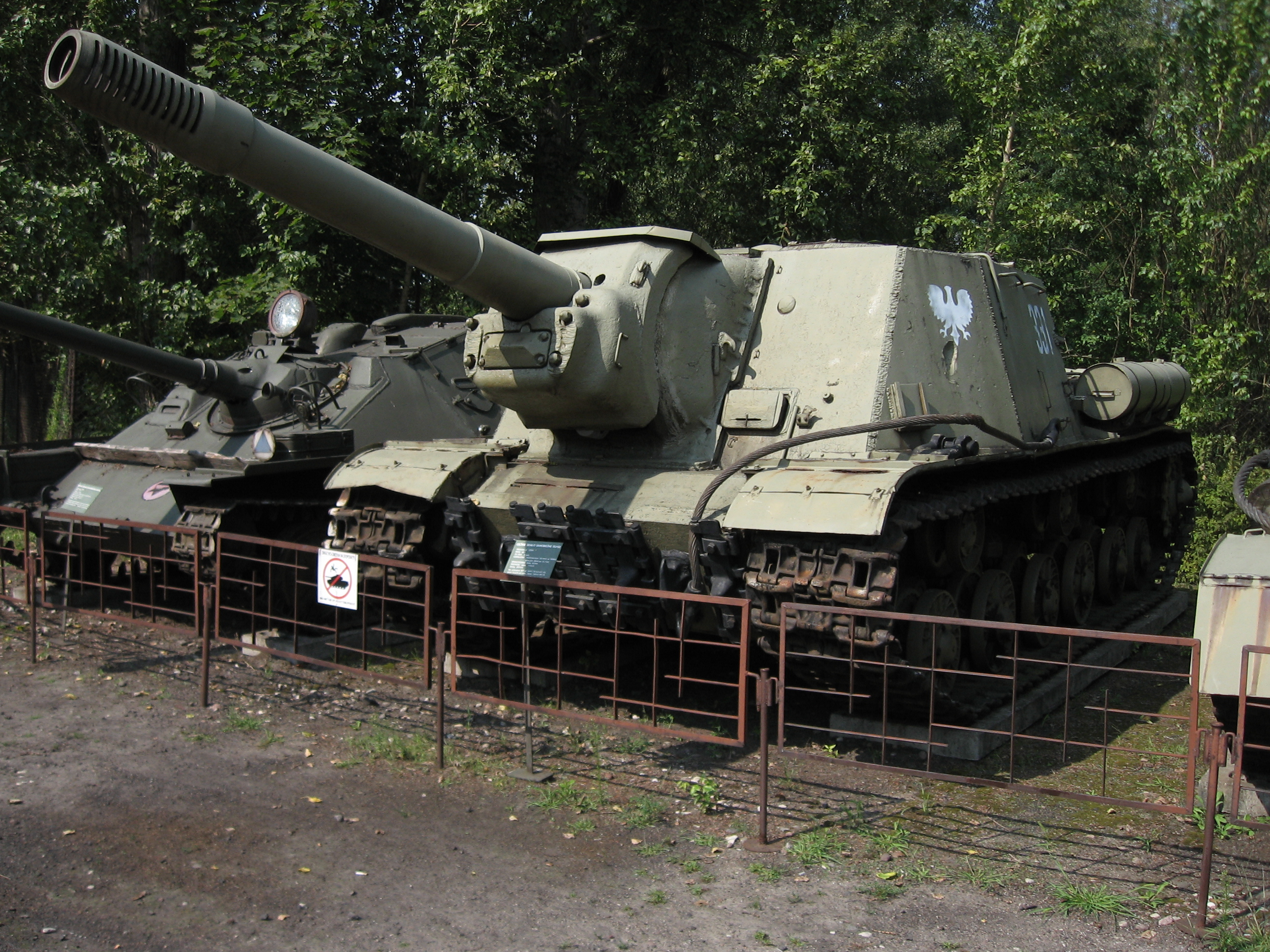
Polish ISU-152 displayed at the Muzeum Polskiej Techniki Wojskowej in Warsaw.

In 1944, more than 30 ISU-152s were delivered to the People's Army of Poland. Shortly afterwards, the Polish military created the 25th Polish Self-Propelled Artillery Regiment, which consisted of 10 ISU-152s and 22 ISU-122s. As part of the 1st Polish Tank Corps (which operated both T-34-76 and T-34-85 tanks), the regiment took part in combat action along the River Nysa, located in southwestern Poland in March 1945. In the early months of 1945, the Polish command began to form another ISU-152 regiment, but with too few vehicles, the newly-formed 13th Polish self-propelled artillery regiment received two ISU-152s and two batteries comprising SU-85s. This regiment took part in the Battle of Berlin between April and May 1945.

Post-WWII, ISU-152s remained in service with the Polish military until the early 1960s.

=== Czechoslovakia ===
As part of the Soviet Union's military assistance to friendly or pro-Soviet countries around the world, a few ISU-152s were transferred to the Czechoslovak military after World War II, which operated them until the end of 1950s. For several decades it was the heaviest armoured vehicle in the Czechoslovak People's Army, which used these to test newly developed anti-tank obstacles.

=== Romania ===
One captured during World War II. The Romanian Army had received 20 ISU-152s during the 1950s; these were assigned to the artillery units of the 6th, 7th and 57th tank divisions of the Romanian Army. They were known as T-152 in Romanian service.

=== Yugoslavia ===
The Royal Yugoslav Army had only one ISU-152 in its inventory. This sole vehicle was abandoned by units of the Soviet Red Army's 2nd Ukrainian Front in 1944. In 1946, members of the Yugoslav 2nd Tank Brigade's first battalion, led by technical officer Stojimir Ilijevic – Guerrilla, recovered the self-propelled gun after five days of work. As a unique vehicle it was used by the Army's Tank School at Bela Crkva. After it was withdrawn from service, this single Yugoslav ISU-152 ended up as a practice target at the Manjača firing range.

=== China ===
In 1955, the Soviet Army moved out from Dalian in northeastern China, officially ending 10 years of military occupation. All weapons and armaments left behind by the Soviet Union were sold to the Chinese People's Liberation Army, including 67 ISU-152s; 45 were given to the newly created 1st Mechanized Division of the PLA.

=== North Korea ===
During and after the Korean War, ISU-152s were operated by the Korean People's Army of the North Korea. North Korea reportedly still uses ISU-152s in both active and reserve units, however, the actual number is unknown.

=== Egypt ===
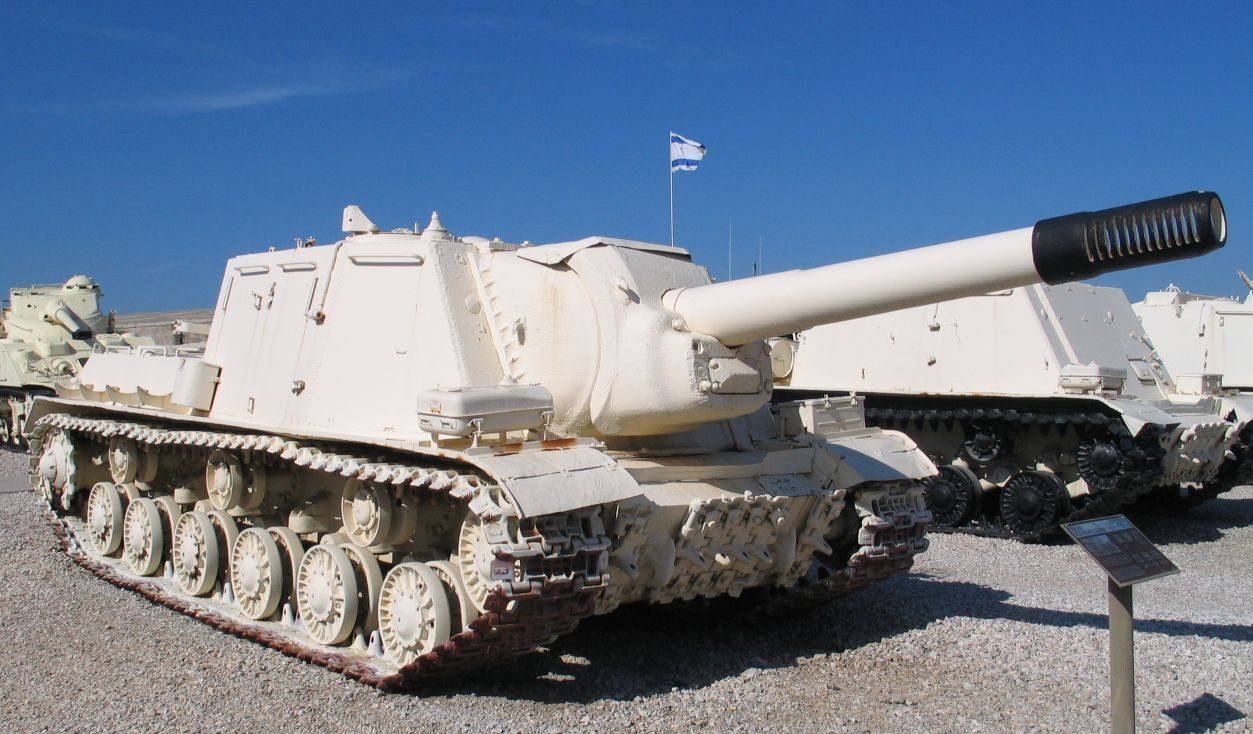
Captured Egyptian ISU-152 in the Yad la-Shiryon Museum, Israel.

In the early 1960s the Egyptian military received at least one regiment of ISU-152s. They were used during the Arab-Israeli conflicts (Six-Day War, War of Attrition, Yom Kippur War) between 1967 and 1973. One ISU-152 captured by the Israeli Defence Forces is now on display at a museum in Yad la-Shiryon.

=== Iraq ===
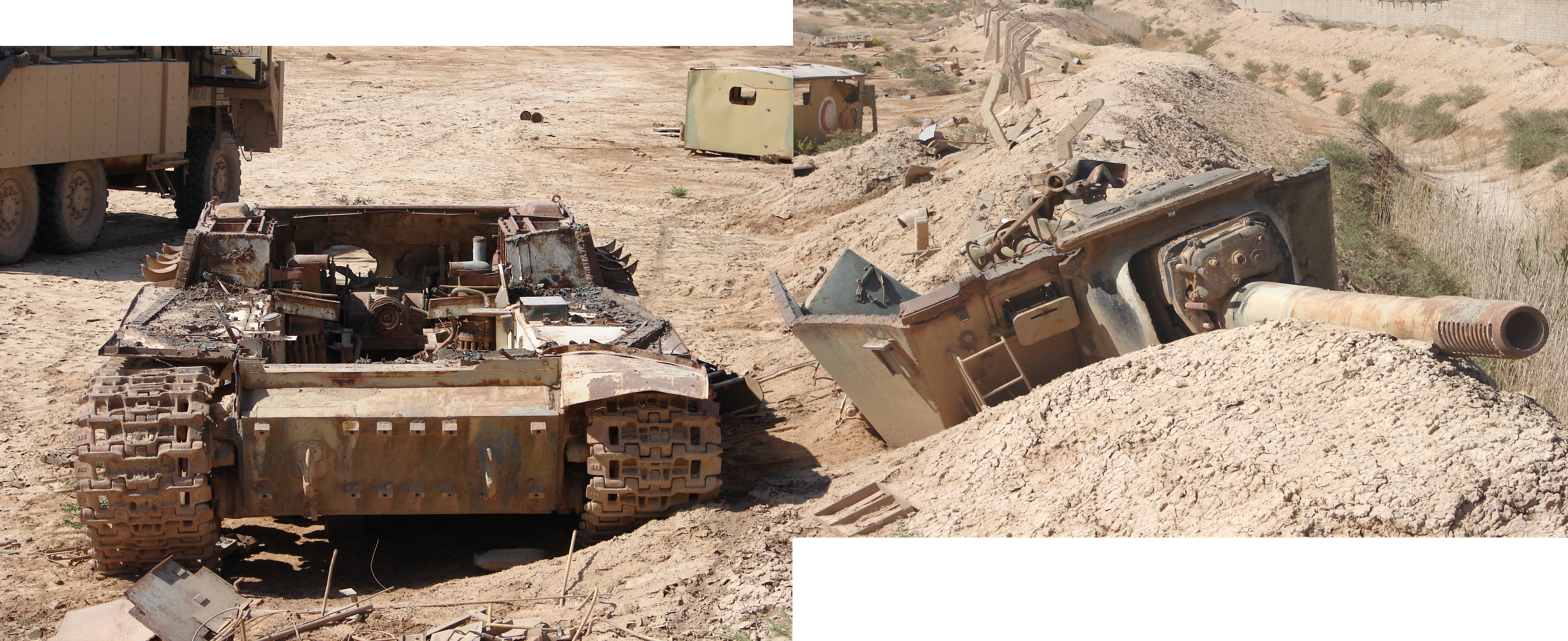
A wrecked ISU-152 at Camp Fallujah, Iraq.

A few surviving examples were operational during the Iran–Iraq War and First Gulf War.

=== Algeria ===
In the 1960s, the Soviet Union supplied Algeria with ISU-122 and ISU-152 self-propelled artillery (ACS)

== Survivors and memorials ==
The ISU-152 can be seen, exhibited or simply located, at different museums and memorials around the world. Some were used to create monuments.

- Military Historical Museum of Artillery, Engineers and Signal Corps, Saint Petersburg, Russia
- Central Museum of Armed Forces, Moscow, Russia
- Military Historical Museum of Armored Fighting Vehicles and Equipment in Kubinka, Kubinka, Russia
- Sapun Mountain Memorial, Sevastopol, Ukraine
- National Museum of the History of Ukraine in the Second World War, Kyiv, Ukraine (two vehicles, one of which is crudely modified with spare D-25T gun and labeled as ISU-122)
- Museum of the Polish Army, Warsaw, Poland
- Armoured Warfare Museum, Poznań, Poland
- Military Technical Museum, Lešany, Czech Republic
- The Armored Corps Memorial Site and Museum at Latrun, Latrun, Israel
- Stalin Line Museum, Minsk, Belarus
- Belarusian State Museum of Great Patriotic War History, Minsk, Belarus
- Parola Armor Museum, Parola, Finland
- German-Russian Museum Berlin-Karlshorst, Karlshorst, Berlin, Germany
- Victory Park Memorial, Saratov, Russia
- Victory Park Memorial, Moscow, Russia
- People's Tank Museum, Changping District, Beijing, People's Republic of China.
- Imperial War Museum, Duxford, Cambridgeshire, England – Now sold to private collector.
- Royal Museum of the Armed Forces and Military History, Brussels (Belgium) not present in Brussels anymore, most tanks have been moved to other museum sites in Belgium
- Australian Armour and Artillery Museum, Cairns, Australia.
