= SU-152 =

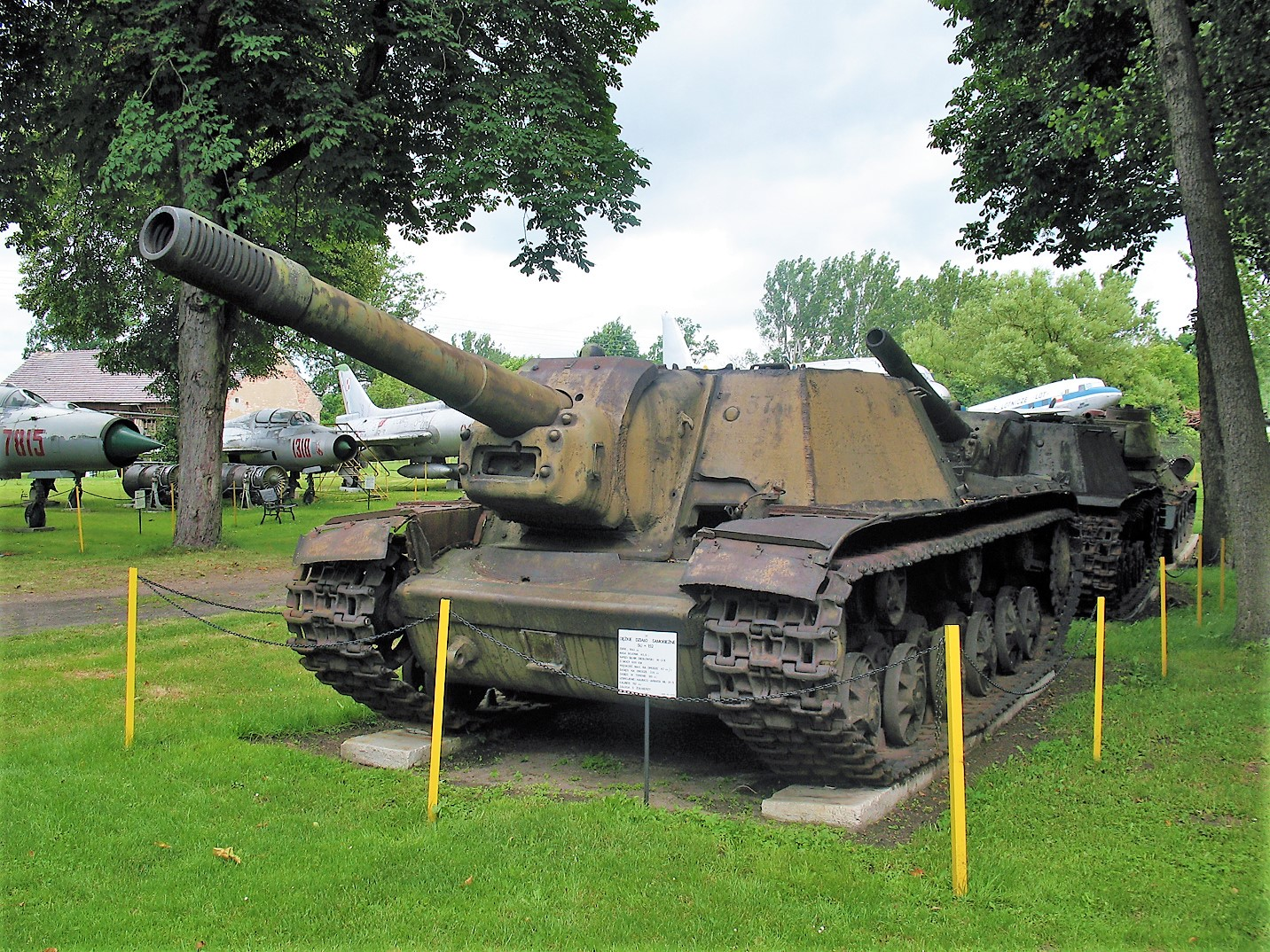
- SU-152 in Lubuskie Military Museum, Poland
- Type: Assault gun
- Place of origin: Soviet Union

Service history
- In service: 1943–1958
- Used by: Soviet Union

Production history
- No. built: 670 (officially)

Specifications
- Mass: 45.5 tonnes (100,300 lb)
- Length: 8.95 m (29 ft 4 in)
- Width: 3.25 m (10 ft 8 in)
- Height: 2.45 m (8 ft)
- Crew: 5
- Armor: Front: 75 mm (2.95 in); Sides: 60 mm (2.36 in); Roof: 20 mm (0.78 in)
- Main armament: 152 mm ML-20S gun-howitzer (20 rounds)
- Secondary armament: 1× 12.7 mm DShK machine gun (optional)
- Engine: Model V-2K 4-stroke V-12 diesel engine 600 metric horsepower (441 kW)
- Power/weight: 13.2 PS/tonne
- Suspension: Torsion bar suspension
- Fuel capacity: 600-975 liter
- Operational range: Road: 180 km (110 mi); 330 km (210 mi) (with additional fuel tanks); Cross-country: 90 km (56 mi); 120 km (75 mi) (with additional fuel tanks)
- Maximum speed: 43 km/h (27 mph)

The SU-152 (Russian: самоходная установка-152, СУ-152, romanized: Samokhodnaya Ustanovka-152) is a Soviet self-propelled heavy howitzer used during World War II.

It mounted a 152 mm gun-howitzer on the chassis of a KV-1S heavy tank. Later production used an IS tank chassis and was re-designated ISU-152. Because of its adopted role as an impromptu heavy tank destroyer, capable of knocking out heavy German armoured vehicles such as the Tiger and Elefant, it was nicknamed Zveroboy ("Beast Slayer").

== Development ==
The Stalingrad counteroffensive, Operation Uranus, exposed the Red Army's urgent need for mobile heavy guns to destroy German fortifications. At the time Soviet front-line ground units did not possess sufficient firepower to deal with pillboxes and other fortifications.

Close support of artillery and combat engineers was an important factor in the success of Operation Uranus. However, with rare exceptions, Soviet guns and howitzers at this time were towed rather than self-propelled. This lack of mobility was exacerbated by the absence of roads, the presence of deep snow and a scarcity of artillery tractors.

Towed guns were also vulnerable to counterattack while moving, especially since they were often hauled by horses or their crews. The 152 mm heavy howitzers were particularly difficult to maneuver owing to their great weight. They were incapable of crossing rivers on anything but tank bridges and were prone to being abandoned after becoming mired.

In November 1942, the State Defense Committee therefore ordered the development of a heavy self-propelled gun with a 152.4mm ML-20 howitzer.

The Red Army had dedicated anti-fortification vehicles in the pre-war period, such as the KV-2 heavy tank armed with the 152.4 mm M-10 howitzer. However, mass production of KV-2s ceased in October 1941, when the Kirov Works had to be evacuated from Leningrad to Chelyabinsk. An unknown number were still operating in 1942.

The new anti-fortification vehicle was designed with the same purpose in mind, but with higher mobility, heavier armor, reduced production cost, and the more powerful and accurate ML-20 152mm gun. Mounting the ML-20 in a turret was impossible due to its length and recoil, and it was decided that the new vehicle should have a non-rotating gun mounted in a fixed casemate-style superstructure.

Several other anti-fortification vehicle projects had all been halted. Later in the war these projects were restarted. In December 1942 three different designs of "pillbox killer" vehicles were introduced by engineer groups from the major Soviet artillery and tank factories. All of these designs used the ML-20 gun as a primary armament, with the KV-1S heavy tank chassis. After some discussion, the project of Josef Kotin was chosen for mass production. This design successfully combined the ML-20 and KV-1S chassis with minimal expense.

The project was designated "KV-14" and assembly of the first prototype (called "Object 236") began on December 31, 1942. It was completed after 25 days. Plant trials of "Object 236" began on January 25, 1943. After a number of successful plant tests the more stringent state tests began. "Object 236" succeeded again. On February 14, 1943 the State Defense Committee accepted it for Red Army service and immediately launched it into mass production at the Chelyabinskiy Kirovskiy Zavod (Chelyabinsk Kirov Plant, ChKZ). The designation of the series of self-propelled guns was changed from KV-14 to SU-152. The ML-20 gun was slightly modified for mounting in the SU-152 — some handles were moved for improved gunner comfort. This variant had the designation ML-20S. The muzzle velocity and external ballistics were identical to the original towed ML-20 gun.

Although designed with no consideration for the anti-tank role, the SU-152 proved to have surprisingly good anti-tank capabilities due to the ML-20S's extremely heavy high explosive projectiles. Purpose-built anti-tank guns of the period usually relied on small, high-velocity solid projectiles, optimised for punching through armour. Since the SU-152, like all SU-series self-propelled guns was not designed with tank killing in mind, no AP projectiles were issued to crews and no initial tests against armor were conducted. However, tests performed on captured Tiger tanks in early 1943 showed that the SU-152 was able to destroy them at any range with some reliability (in 1943, this was the only vehicle in Russian service capable of doing so) by dislodging the turret through blast effect. This discovery spurred massive SU-152 production and the formation of self-propelled artillery units, which then functioned as heavy tank destroyer battalions.

After the SU-152 began mass production, it was slightly modified to improve reliability and effectiveness. Initially the SU-152 lacked a machine gun, which was a severe weakness in urban warfare and other close combat. To solve this problem the DShK 12.7 mm anti-aircraft gun installation was developed in the summer of 1943. Some SU-152s received it after repair. The SU-152 was the last member of the KV family of tanks in mass production, and was replaced by the ISU-152 on the ChKZ production lines in December 1943. The exact number of SU-152s produced differs even in Russian sources, with the most common figures being 670 or 704.

The SU-152s that survived World War II were withdrawn from Soviet Army service in 1958.

== Construction and design ==
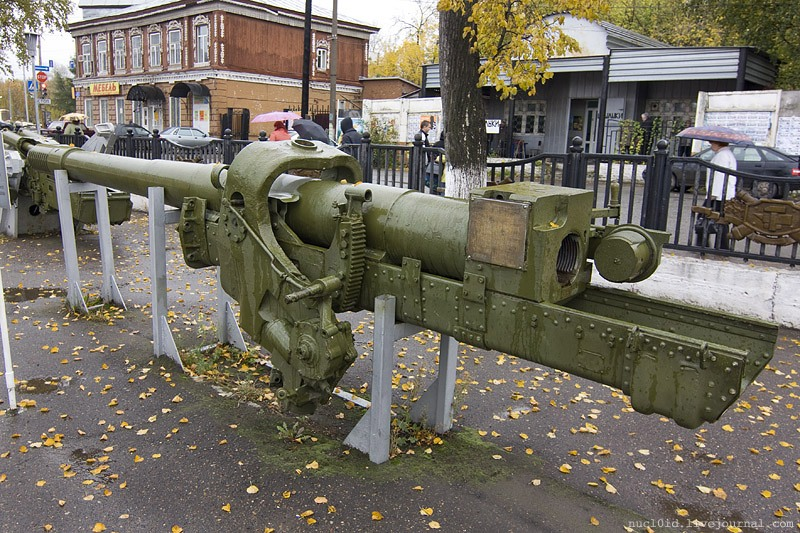
152-mm howitzer-gun ML-20S for SU-152 in Motovilikha Plants museum, Russia)

The SU-152 followed the same, fully enclosed casemated design as most other Soviet self-propelled guns. The fully armoured hull was divided into two compartments: one for the crew, gun, and ammunition in the front of the hull, and one for the engine and transmission in the rear. The hull was welded from rolled armour plates of different thickness — 75, 60, 30 and 20 mm. The front hull and superstructure armour plates were sloped for better vehicle protection, while side armour was vertical. Lower front hull and rear armour plates were cylindrical, and relatively complex in their method of production. The ML-20S gun-howitzer was mounted slightly to the right of centre with a limited traverse in a range of 12 degrees. Three of the crew were to the left of the gun, with the driver to the front, then the gunner and lastly the loader. The vehicle commander and breech mechanism operator were to the right.

The suspension consisted of 12 torsion bars for the six road wheels (each 600 mm in diameter) on each side. The drive sprockets were at the back. Each track was made up of 90 stamped links, each link of 608 mm width. The normal distance between two connected links was 160 mm. There were three internal fuel tanks, two in the crew area and one in the engine compartment, for a total capacity of 600–615 litres. These were usually enhanced by four unconnected external fuel tanks, which could hold an additional 360 litres of fuel. A 24-volt electrical power supply came from a 1 kW GT-4563A generator with a RRA-24 voltage relay regulator unit and four 6STE-128 accumulator batteries with a total capacity of 256 ampere-hours. This electrical equipment was common in contemporary Soviet armoured vehicles. The generator and accumulator batteries fed all other electrical equipment — the ST-700 electric starter motor, a radio set, an intercom, external and internal lights, and illumination of gunsight scales.

For observation from the interior, all roof hatches had periscopes along with two gun sights: the telescopic ST-10 (СТ-10) and a panoramic sight. For crew communication a TPU-4-BisF intercom was fitted, and for inter-vehicle communication there was a single radio. The first-series SU-152 was equipped with the 9R, then 10R and finally the 10RK-26 radio set. These radios were better than Soviet equipment at the start of the war, but inferior to German equipment.

The crew was equipped with two PPSh submachine guns and 25 F1 grenades for short-range self-defence.

== Combat history ==
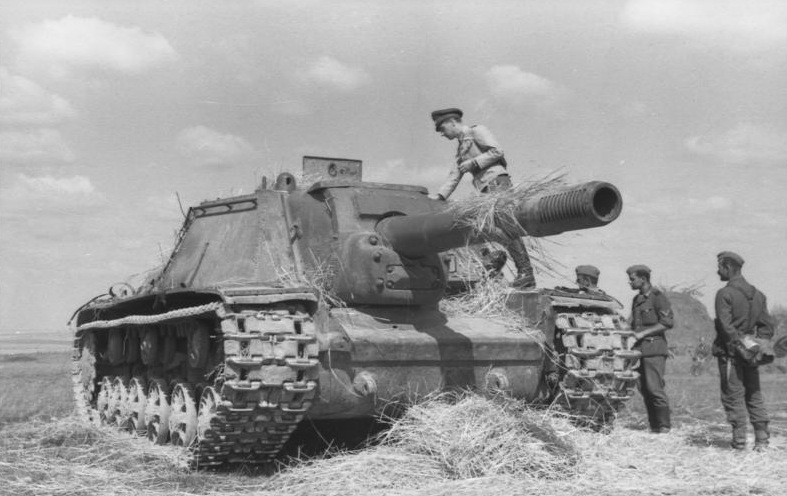
An abandoned SU-152 assault gun inspected by German troops, Soviet Union, 1943

Although not designed for the role, the SU-152 proved to be a cheap and effective heavy tank killer, second only to the SU-100 as a Soviet antitank vehicle, as well as successful at its original role against infantry and fortifications, serving a similar role to the SU-100Y.

The SU-152 was produced in large numbers throughout 1943, with the first SU-152s being issued to new heavy mechanized gun regiments raised in May 1943. The first regiment arrived at Kursk with only 12 guns, and was brought up to its full strength of 21 guns during the fighting.

Disadvantages of the vehicle included a low rate of fire due to the heavy ammunition, low ammunition storage (only 20 rounds), and a cramped and un-ergonomic crew compartment. Its armor protection was only adequate; the 65 mm of 30-degree sloped frontal armor still left it vulnerable frontally to the 88 mm KwK 36/43 guns of the Tiger and Ferdinand/Elefant at long range and the 7.5 cm KwK 40 high-velocity gun of the Panzer IV and StuG III/IV at medium and short ranges (and from any range from the flanks or rear). The 152 mm gun, while having a maximum range far superior to the 88 mm, was still essentially a heavy howitzer with a shorter accurate range than the 88 mm and 7.5 cm guns while being vulnerable to return fire at the same distance. This made it most effective for use against entrenched enemies, where the German heavy tanks' advantages could be nullified and the SU-152s could utilize their one-shot kill potential.

Since it was intended as a self-propelled artillery piece rather than a true tank destroyer, the SU-152 was generally issued with standard HE rounds rather than armor-piercing projectiles. The 152mm HE round produced a massive blast that did not rely on velocity for its effectiveness, making it effective against any German tank, including the Tiger and Elefant (although still less effective than penetrating projectiles). It was capable of dislodging the turret of a Tiger tank (at any range), and numerous German armored fighting vehicles were claimed destroyed or damaged by SU-152s during the Battle of Kursk.

However, it proved less reliable at permanently destroying the Ferdinand heavy tank destroyer, whose bulkier, simplified design was more resistant to non-penetrating HE blast. While the Russians knocked out at least seven German Ferdinands in SU-152 ambushes at Kursk during one operation, German after-action engineers were able to repair, recrew and return nearly all to battle the next day. This has been attributed to the gun's blast killing the crew and destroying the vehicle's interior via concussion and spalling without harming the ammunition supply or chassis. Soviet SU-152 crews were ordered to continue firing at incapacitated tanks until their turrets were knocked off, but the Ferdinand did not have a turret.

After Kursk, the 152 mm BR-540 solid-core AP round was produced in small numbers and issued to heavy tank destroyer battalions as a penetrating projectile, but the gun's low velocity made the AP round no more accurate and only moderately more effective than the standard HE round (which could also be used against infantry).

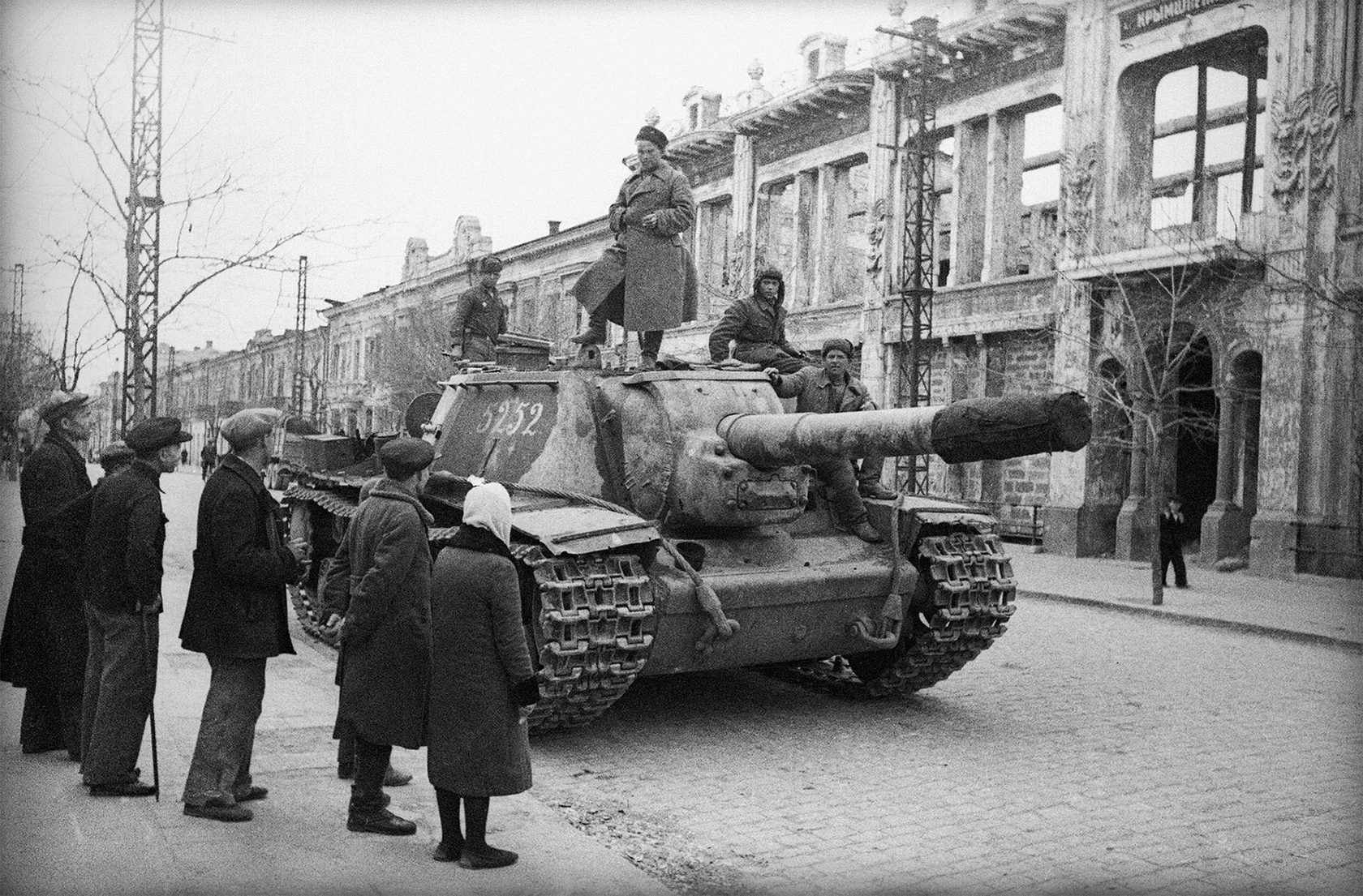
An SU-152 on a street in Simferopol during the Crimean offensive, 13 April 1944

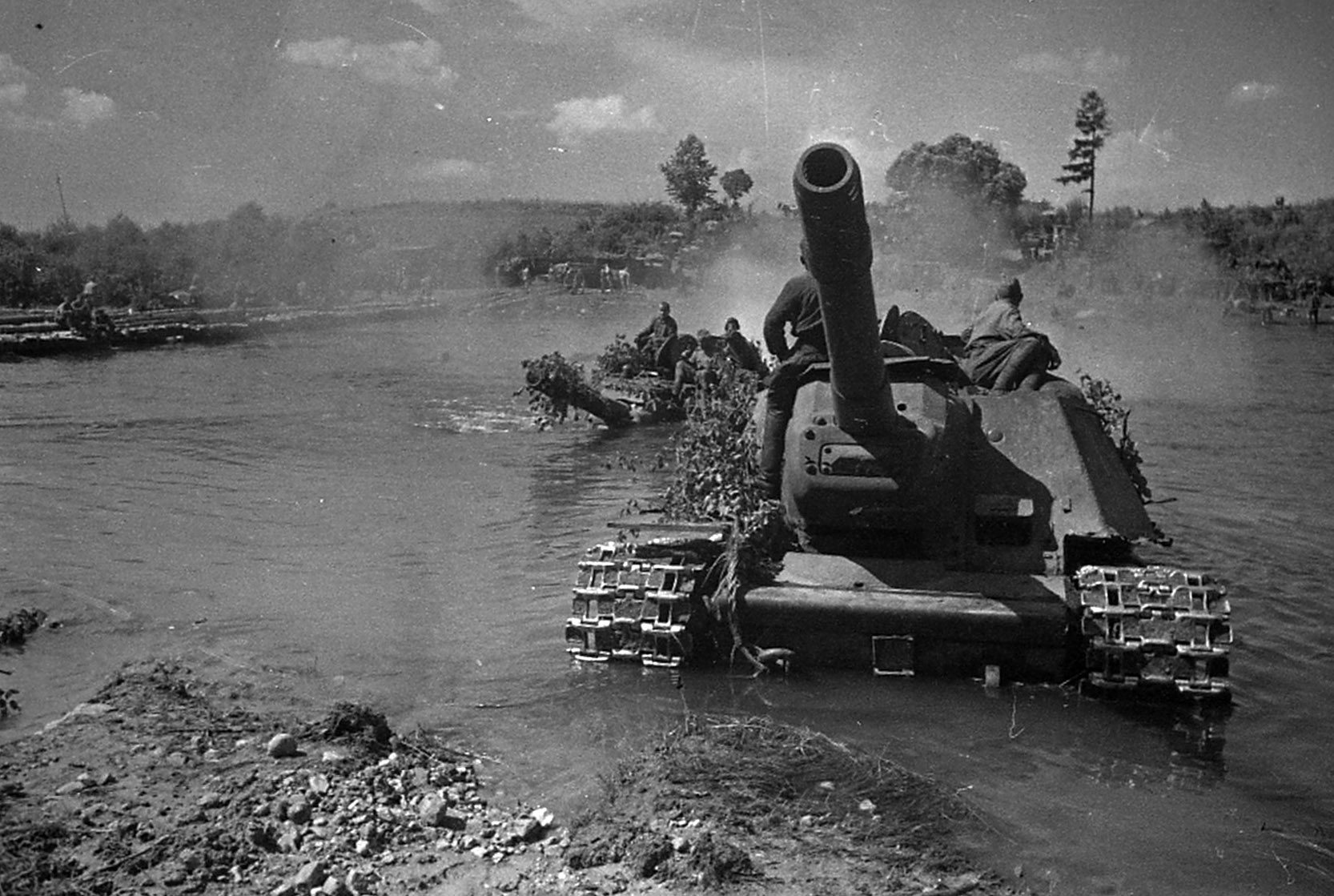
SU-152s fording a river in Latvia, mid-1944

After Kursk, the SU-152 played an important role in destroying German fortifications during the Operation Bagration offensive, this being the vehicle's original design goal..From the second half of 1943 to the end of World War II SU-152s were used on all Soviet fronts, from Finland to the Crimea. Due to combat losses and mass production ceasing in December 1943, the number of SU-152s in the Soviet Army decreased. Eventually SU-152s were replaced by the more reliable and better-armored ISU-152, which used the same armament and ammunition in the same dual-purpose role. Despite this, the SU-152 remained in Soviet Army service throughout World War II and post-war until 1958.

== Operators ==
- Soviet Union
- Germany - Captured units.
- Poland - 3 vehicles used for training from 1945 until 1949.

== Organization ==
The SU-152 was used by the Independent Heavy Self-propelled Artillery Regiments (OTSAP, ОТСАП, in Russian, from Otdel'niy Tyazheliy Samokhodno-Artilleriyskiy Polk, Отдельный Тяжелый Самоходно-Артиллерийский Полк). Initially each OTSAP had twelve SU-152s, divided into three batteries of four vehicles. One KV-1S tank served as a commander's vehicle. After November 1943 the OTSAP organisation changed to 21 vehicles per regiment.

== See also ==
- List of Soviet tanks
- SU-100
- ISU-152
- ISU-122
