= Karlshorst =

- Quarter of Berlin
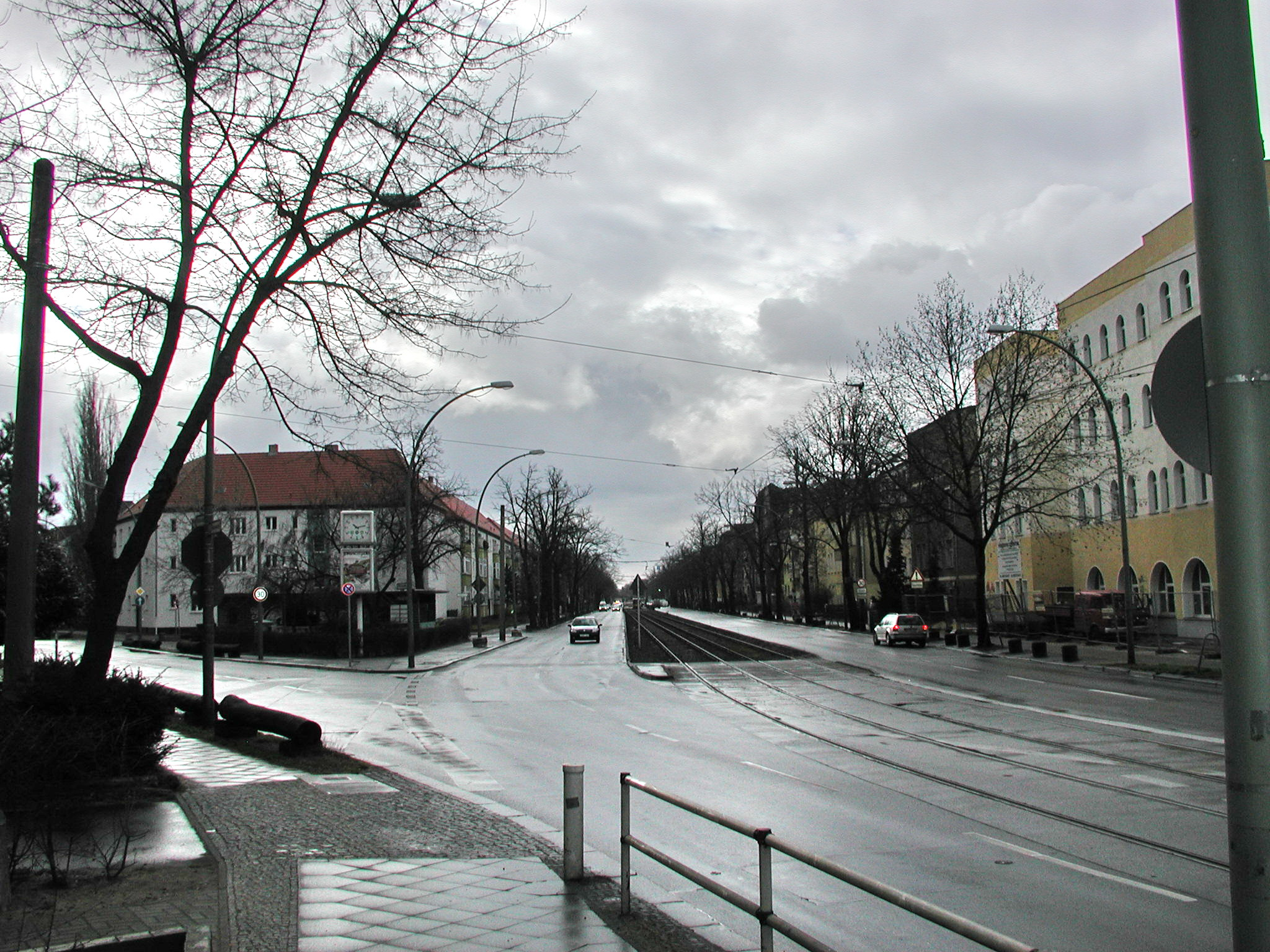
- Treskowallee

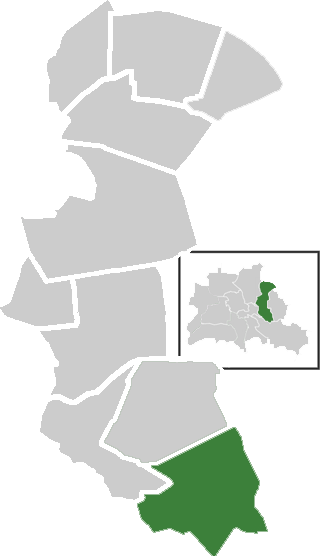
- Location of Karlshorst in Lichtenberg district and Berlin
- Interactive map of Karlshorst
- Location within Germany Location within Berlin
- Coordinates: 52°31′16″N 13°28′48″E
- Country: Germany
- State: Berlin
- City: Berlin
- Borough: Lichtenberg, Berlin
- Founded: 1895

Area
  - Total: 6.6 km^{2} (2.5 sq mi)
- Elevation: 37–42 m (121–138 ft)

Population (2024-12-31)
  - Total: 31,890
  - Density: 4,800/km^{2} (13,000/sq mi)
- Time zone: UTC+01:00 (CET)
  - Summer (DST): UTC+02:00 (CEST)
- Postal codes: 10318
- Vehicle registration: B

Karlshorst (/kɑːrlshɔːrst/, German: [ˈkaʁlsˌhɔst]; locally pronounced [ka:ltshɔst]; literally meaning Karl's nest) is a locality in the borough of Lichtenberg in Berlin. It is home to a harness racing track, the Hochschule für Technik und Wirtschaft Berlin (HTW), the largest University of Applied Sciences in Berlin, and the Museum Berlin-Karlshorst.

== History ==
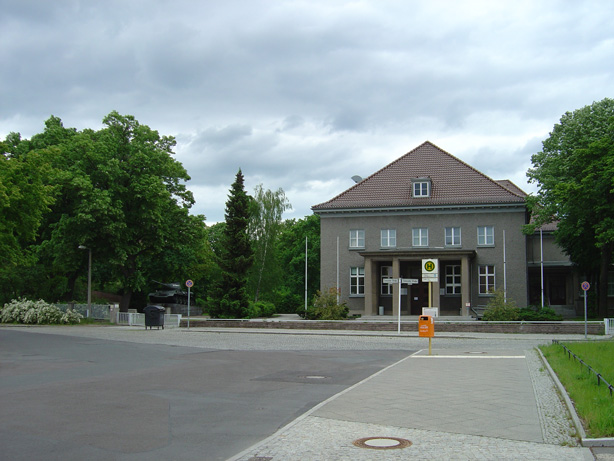
The German-Russian Museum

Established in 1895 as the Carlshorst mansion's colony, Karlshorst from 1901 had access to the railway line from Berlin to Breslau (today Wrocław, Poland) and developed to a quite affluent residential area, sometimes referred to as "Dahlem of the East". The locality encompasses the Waldsiedlung, a garden city laid out between 1919 and 1921 according to plans by Peter Behrens.

In April 1945, as the Red Army approached the Reich's capital, Marshal Georgy Zhukov, commander of the 1st Belorussian Front, established his headquarters at a former Heer officer's mess hall in Karlshorst, where on May 8, the unconditional surrender of the German forces was presented to Zhukov by Colonel-General Hans-Jürgen Stumpff as the representative of the Luftwaffe, Field Marshal Wilhelm Keitel as Chief of Staff of OKW, and Admiral Hans-Georg von Friedeburg as Commander-in-Chief of the Kriegsmarine.

From 1945 to 1949, the building complex served as the headquarters of the Soviet Military Administration in Germany. After the establishment of the German Democratic Republic, it hosted various ministries of the GDR, and from 1963 on offices of both the KGB and the GRU. In fact The KGB residency in East Berlin-Karlshorst was the largest in the world; it produced as much intelligence as an entire directorate back in Moscow thanks to East German efforts. But none of this was known in the West until after the Berlin Wall had fallen. The buildings on the side of the Museum had been left for a long time abandoned, now the process of renovation has started and as usual in Berlin, the former KGB buildings are now apartments. The leadership of the Politburo of the Socialist Unity Party of Germany hid at the complex during the East German uprising of 1953, where Lavrentiy Beria also traveled to from Moscow to personally coordinate the Soviet Army's repression of the rebellion. The last Russian soldiers left Karlshorst in 1994. The former headquarters has been made the home of the Museum Berlin-Karlshorst, formerly called the Capitulation Museum, and later the Deutsch-Russisches Museum.

The 6th Independent Motorized Rifle Brigade, the Soviets' "Berlin Brigade," had barracks in the nearby Wuhlheide area.

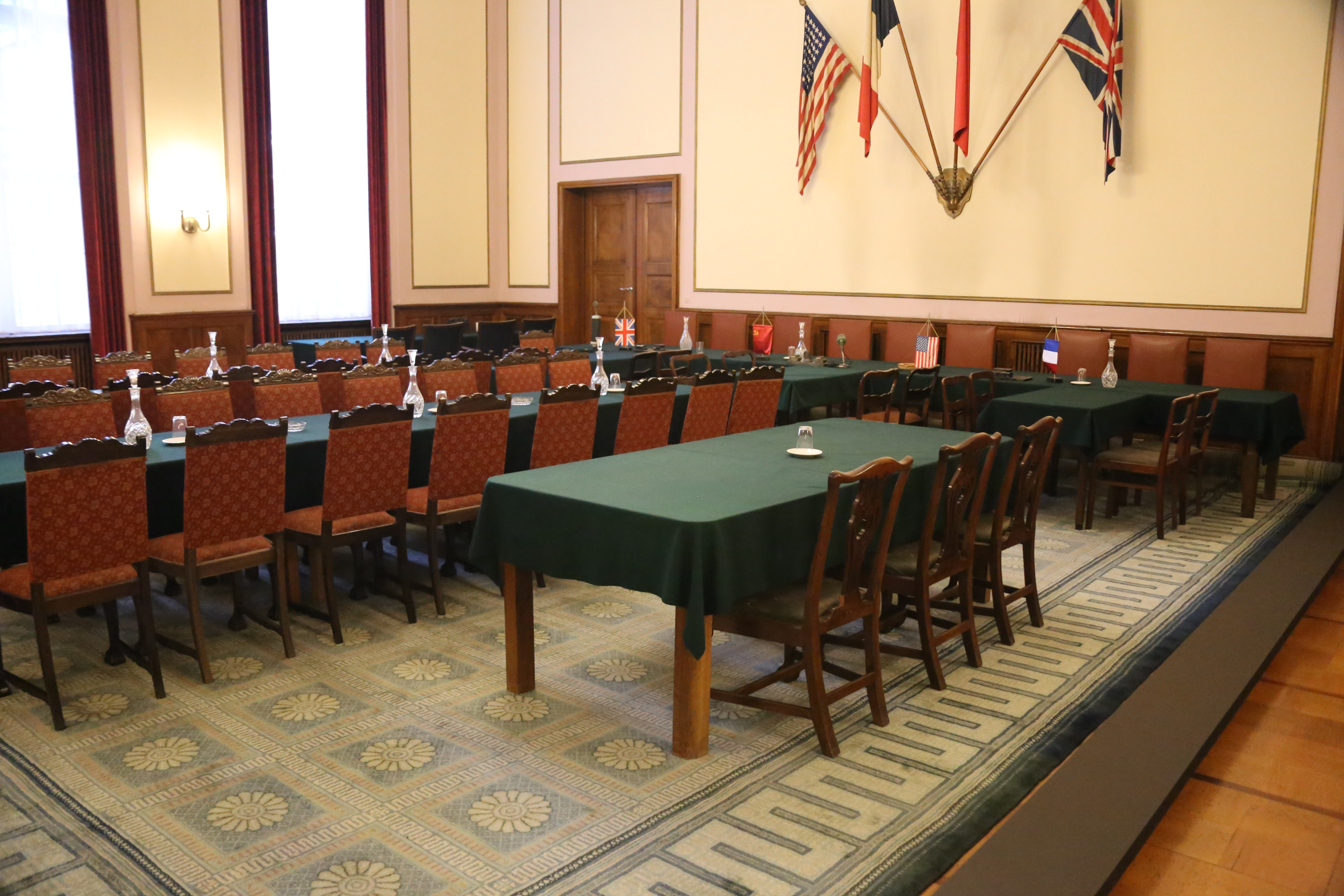
Original table and chairs as set up for the second signing of the Unconditional Surrender of the Germans

== Transportation ==
Karlshorst has access to the Berlin S-Bahn network at Berlin-Karlshorst railway station.

== Notable people ==
=== Born in Karlshorst ===
- Joachim Fest, historian, editor, (1926–2006)
- Ilja Richter (born 1952), actor, voice actor and television presenter

=== Dwelt in Karlshorst ===
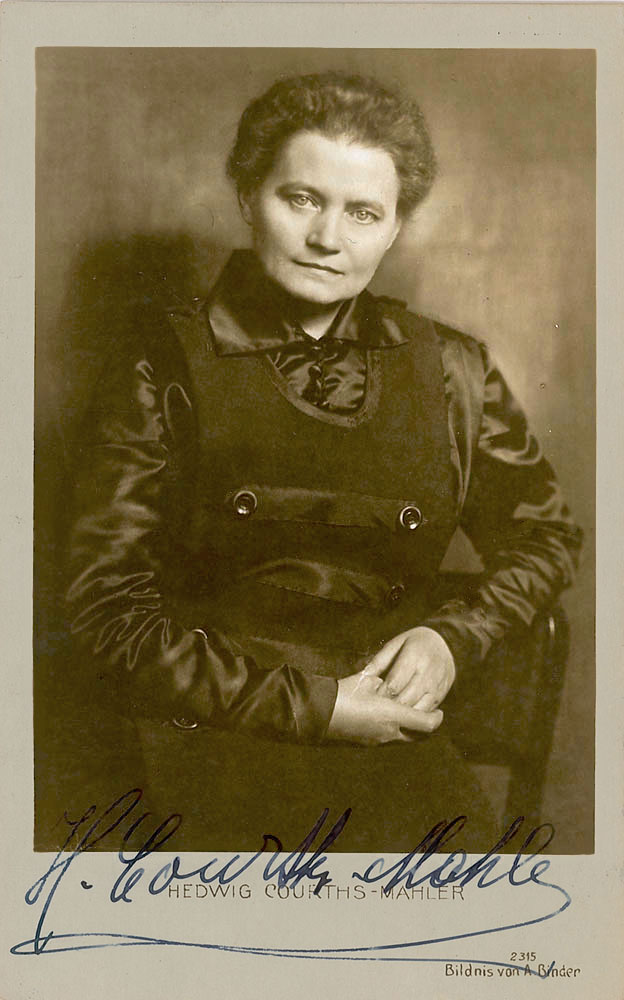
Hedwig Courths-Mahler around 1900

- Max Beer, (1864–1943), historian, Gundelfinger Straße 47
- Hans Bellmer, (1902–1975), photographer, Ehrenfelsstraße 8
- Hans (1916–1942) and Hilde Coppi, (1909–1943), resistance fighters, Römerweg
- Hedwig Courths-Mahler, (1867–1950), writer, Dönhoffstraße 11 from 1905 to 1914
- Erich Ollenhauer, (1901–1963), politician, Trautenauer Straße 6
- August Stramm, (1874–1915), poet, Lehndorffstraße 16
- Ernst Torgler, (1903–1963), politician (Communist Party of Germany), Liepnitzstraße 46
- Max Wertheimer, (1880–1943), psychologist, Ehrlichstraße 31

The engineer Georg Knorr (1859–1911), is buried at the Karlshorst cemetery.

== See also ==
- Victory in Europe Day
