= Museum Berlin-Karlshorst =

Museum in Germany

Coordinates: 52°29′10″N 13°32′23″E

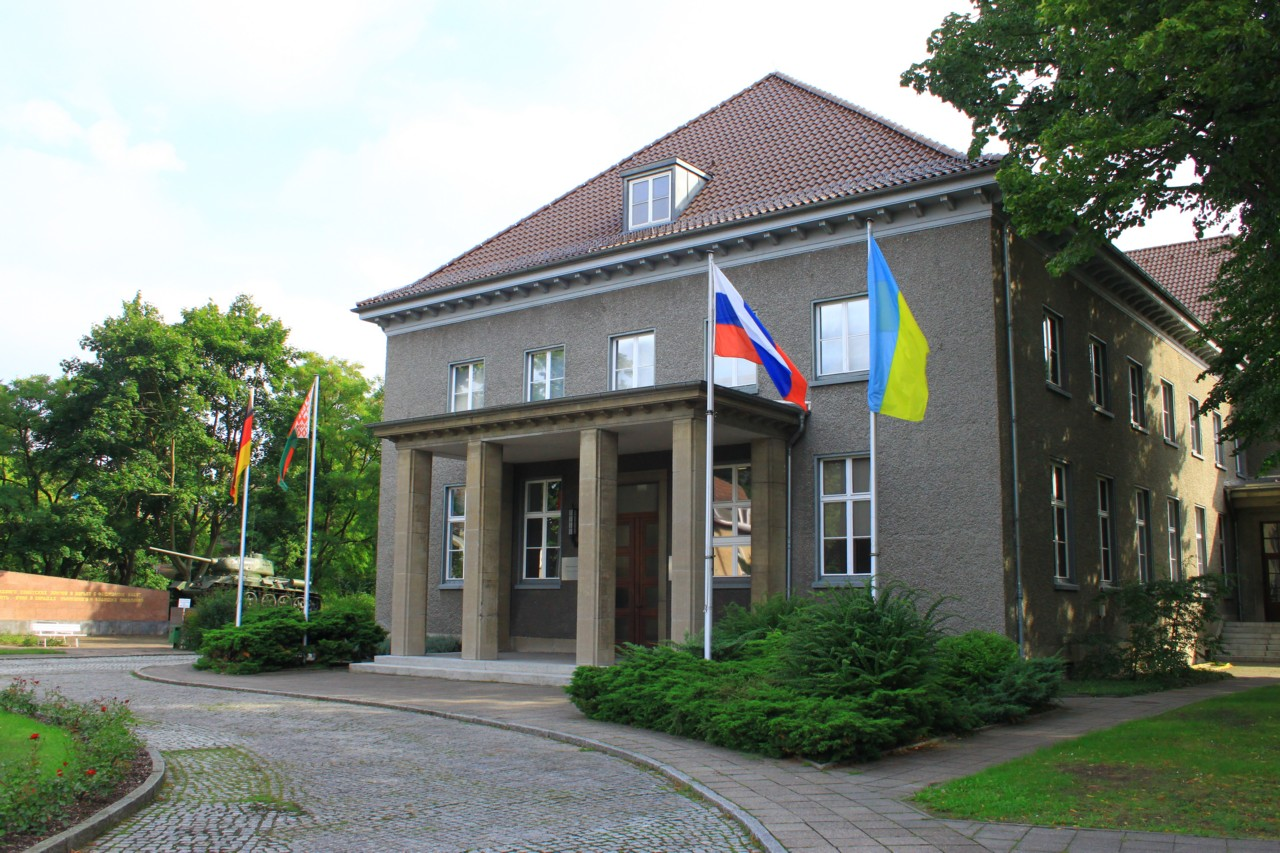
Museum Berlin-Karlshorst exterior

German-Russian Museum, Berlin

The Museum Berlin-Karlshorst, previously named German-Russian Museum Berlin-Karlshorst (Deutsch-Russisches Museum Berlin-Karlshorst) is dedicated to German-Soviet and German-Russian relations with a focus on the German-Soviet war of 1941–1945.

== The museum building ==
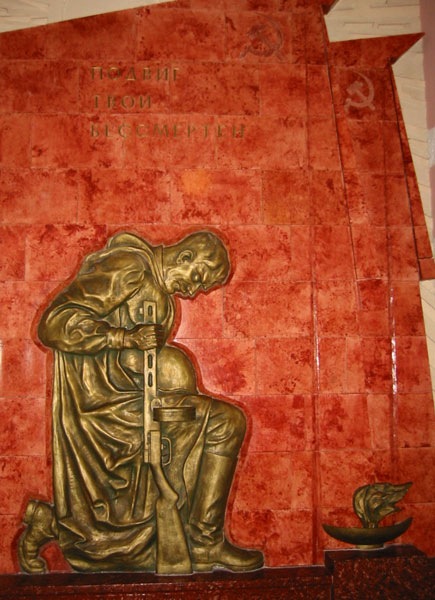
Soviet bas-relief sculpture in the museum

The museum is located at the historical venue of the unconditional surrender of the German armed forces (Wehrmacht) on 8 May 1945. With this act of ratification in Karlshorst of the instrument of surrender signed the day before in Rheims, World War II came to an end in Europe. The building was the officers' mess of the Wehrmacht pioneer school and then the headquarters of the Soviet Military Administration in Germany. In 1949 at this location the Soviets handed over administrative authority to the first government of the German Democratic Republic (GDR). From 1967 to 1994 the building contained a branch of the “Central Museum of Armed Forces Moscow” featuring the unconditional surrender of Nazi Germany in the Great Patriotic War.

After German-Soviet agreements on the withdrawal of Soviet armed forces from Germany in 1990, Germany and the Soviet Union decided to jointly recollect in the museum the history of the German-Soviet war and the end of Nazi rule. After restructuring the permanent exhibition, the German-Russian Museum opened to the public in May 1995.

== Permanent exhibition ==
The permanent exhibition, which attracts about 40,000 visitors annually, conveys on approximately 1,000 square meters an impression of the history of German-Soviet relations from 1917 to 1990. The focus is on the German-Soviet War 1941–1945, including the political background, propaganda and hostile stereotypes, and the day-to-day life of soldiers and civilians on both sides of this conflict during different phases of the war.

The heart of the museum is the surrender room, which is in its original state and where a film continuously shows the signing the Act of Surrender in 1945. In addition to the redesigned modern exhibition rooms, parts of the original Soviet exhibition designed for Soviet soldiers stationed in Berlin can also be seen, as well as monuments from Soviet times. On the grounds there is a memorial in which a Soviet T-34 tank is integrated on a pedestal, as well as an exhibit of large items of Soviet military equipment from World War II and the postwar period.

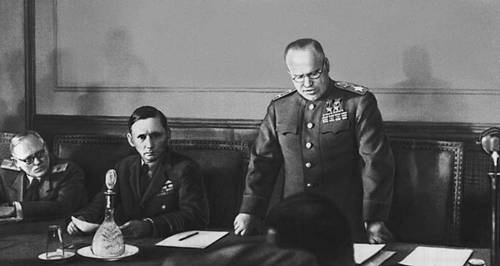
Marshal Georgy Zhukov reading the German capitulation in Berlin. Seated on his right is Arthur Tedder, Marshal of the Royal Air Force and Eisenhower's deputy for the Western Headquarters.

== Special exhibits and other activities ==
Two to three times a year the museum presents special exhibits in a room of about 100 square meters which became available at the end of 1997. Topics include memories of the war as well as subjects relating to German-Soviet/Russian relations. The museum staff draws on its extensive collection of documents, war relics and photographs to prepare these exhibits. Parts of these special exhibits have been shown in other German, Russian and Ukrainian cities.

In addition to the displays, for each special exhibit the museum publishes a catalog in German and Russian which is usually also available in the book trade. Other activities include scientific colloquia, conferences, educational museum tours for school classes, and thematic study tours to Belarus and Russia.

By means of its exhibits and public events the museum strives to create a space for a critical analysis of history, for education, for encounters, and for increased understanding between Germans and Russians. A museum celebration takes place annually on May 8, the date World War II ended in Europe.

== Board of trustees ==
The Museum Berlin-Karlshorst is a so-far unique bi-national institution supported by the Federal Republic of Germany and the Russian Federation. The board of trustees was jointly established in 1994 and contains an equal number of German and Russian bodies. The chairmanship alternates between the General Director of the German Historical Museum and the Director of the Central Museum of Armed Forces Moscow. Additional board members include representatives of the Great Patriotic War Museums in Minsk and Kyiv. In 2025 the Board was changed to remove representatives from Russia and Belarus. Members from museums and research facilities from other former Soviet countries took their place.

== Collections ==
The collection contains many objects from the Central Museum of Armed Forces Moscow. In addition there are items and loans from other German and Eastern European collections, gifts and legacies. The museum collects documents, posters, items revealing day-to-day military life during the war, militaria with an emphasis on military medicine, and photographs. The image archive contains primarily photographs taken by Soviet and German professional and amateur photographers during the war.

The museum has a specialized library on German-Soviet relations with a focus on the war on the Eastern Front. It contains some 3,000 volumes as well as an extensive collection of photographs and can be consulted by outside users for research purposes on request.
